= List of Brazilian writers =

This is a list of Brazilian writers, those born in Brazil or who have established citizenship or residency.

== Writers for children ==
- Ana Maria Machado (born 1941)
- Daniel Munduruku (born 1964)
- Eva Furnari (born 1948)
- Fernanda Takai (born 1971)
- Francisco Marins (1922–2016)
- Júlio César de Mello e Souza (1895–1974), best known as Malba Tahan
- Leo Cunha (born 1966)
- Lúcia Benedetti (1914-1988)
- Lúcia Machado de Almeida (1910–2005)
- Lygia Bojunga (born 1932)
- Maria Clara Machado (1921–2001)
- Maria Valéria Rezende (born 1942)
- Monteiro Lobato (1882-1948)
- Nélida Piñon (1934-2022)
- Pedro Bandeira (born 1942)
- Rubem Alves (1933-2014)
- Ruth Rocha (born 1931)
- Socorro Acioli (born 1975)
- Tatiana Belinky (1919-2013)
- Ziraldo (1932-2024)

== Chroniclers ==
- Artur Azevedo (1855-1908)
- Athos Damasceno Ferreira (1902-1975)
- Austregésilo de Athayde (1898-1993)
- Bussunda (1962-2006)
- Carlos Drummond de Andrade (1902–1987)
- Carlos Heitor Cony (1926-2018)
- Carmen Dolores (1852-1910)
- Clarice Lispector (1920-1977)
- Cora Coralina (1889-1985)
- Cyro dos Anjos (1906-1994)
- Davino Ribeiro de Sena (born 1957)
- Diná Silveira de Queirós (1911-1982)
- Elsie Lessa (1914-2000)
- Fabrício Carpi Nejar (born 1972)
- Fernanda Torres (born 1965)
- Fernando Sabino (1923–2004)
- Ferreira Gullar (1930–2016)
- Ivan Ângelo (born 1936)
- João do Rio (1881–1921)
- João Ubaldo Ribeiro (1941–2014)
- José Américo de Almeida (1887-1980)
- José de Côrtes Duarte (1895–1982)
- Lêdo Ivo (1924-2012)
- Leo Cunha (born 1966)
- Lúcia Benedetti (1914-1998)
- Luis Fernando Verissimo (1936–2025)
- Lya Luft (1938-2021)
- Maria Rita Kehl (born 1951)
- Maria Valéria Rezende (born 1942)
- Mário Filho (1908-1966)
- Martha Medeiros (born 1961)
- Nélida Piñon (1934-2022)
- Nelson Rodrigues (1912–1980)
- Otto Lara Resende (1922-1992)
- Paulo Mendes Campos (1922–1991)
- Pedro Bloch (1914–2004)
- Rubem Alves (1933-2014)
- Rubem Braga (1913–1990)
- Ruth Guimarães (1920-2014)
- Sérgio Porto (1923-1968)
- Tati Bernardi (born 1979)
- Vange Leonel (1963-2014)
- Victor Heringer (1988–2018)

== Short story writers ==
- Adelina Lopes Vieira (1850–1923)
- Adriana Lisboa (born 1970)
- Adrino Aragão (born 1936)
- Alberto Mussa (born 1961)
- Alcântara Machado (1901–1935)
- Aníbal Machado (1894–1964)
- Artur Azevedo (1855-1908)
- Carmen Dolores (1852-1910)
- Clarice Lispector (1920-1977)
- Diná Silveira de Queirós (1911-1982)
- Dalton Trevisan (1925–2024)
- Fausto Fawcett (born 1957)
- Fernando Sabino (1923–2004)
- Flávio Viegas Amoreira (born 1965)
- Geovani Martins (born 1991)
- Guimarães Rosa (1908-1967)
- Gustavo Barroso (1888-1959)
- Ignacio de Loyola Brandão (born 1936)
- Itamar Vieira Junior (born 1979)
- Ivan Ângelo (born 1936)
- João do Rio (1881–1921)
- João Simões Lopes Neto (1865–1916)
- Lêdo Ivo (1924-2012)
- Marcelo Mirisola (born 1966)
- Márcia Denser (1954-2024)
- Maria Valéria Rezende (born 1942)
- Marina Colasanti (1937–2025)
- Marques Rebelo (1907-1973)
- Menalton Braff (born 1938)
- Moacyr Scliar (1937–2011)
- Murilo Rubião (1916–1991)
- Natalia Borges Polesso (born 1981)
- Nélida Piñon (1934-2022)
- Osman Lins (1924–1978)
- Otto Lara Resende (1922-1992)
- Paulo Scott (born 1966)
- Raduan Nassar (born 1935)
- Regina Rheda (born 1957)
- Rubem Fonseca (1925-2020)
- Ruth Guimarães (1920-2014)
- Sérgio Sant'Anna (1941-2020)
- Silviano Santiago (1936)
- Sonia Coutinho (1939–2013)
- Tati Bernardi (born 1979)
- Veronica Stigger (born 1973)

== Nonfiction writers ==
- Arnaldo Jabor (1940-2022)
- Luiz Castanho de Almeida (1904–1981), priest, historian, writer
- Flavio Alves (born 1969), memoirist
- Kevin Einstein Barreto Poubel (1997–alive), grammarian
- Rubem Alves (1933–2014), theologian
- Mário de Andrade (1893–1945), poet, musicologist
- Oswald de Andrade (1890–1954), poet, essayist
- Nelson de Araújo (1926–1993), historian, folklorist
- Gustavo Barroso (1888–1959), politician
- Roger Bastide (1898–1974), sociologist
- Leonardo Boff (born 1938), theologian
- Josué de Castro (1908–1973), sociologist
- Gauss Moutinho Cordeiro (born 1952), mathematician
- Oswaldo Cruz (1872–1917), physician, epidemiologist
- Euclides da Cunha (1866–1909), sociologist
- Luís da Câmara Cascudo (Câmara Cascudo) (1898–1986) folklorist
- Alessandra Silvestri-Levy (born 1972)
- Antônio Houaiss (1915–1999) dicionarist
- Aurélio Buarque de Holanda Ferreira (1910–1989)
- José Maria da Silva Paranhos, Baron of Rio Branco (1819–1880) historian
- Caio Prado Júnior (1907–1990) historian
- Celso Furtado (1920–2004) economist
- Darcy Ribeiro (1922–1997) anthropologist
- Eliane Brum (born 1966)
- Florestan Fernandes (1920–1995) historian, sociologist
- Gilberto Freyre (1900–1987) sociologist
- Joaquim Nabuco (1849–1910) memoirist, diplomat
- José Guilherme Merquior (1941–1991) philosopher, sociologist
- José Lino Grünewald (1931–2000) poet, translator
- José Mariano da Conceição Veloso (1742–1811) botanist
- Julio Ximenes Senior (1901–1975) physician
- Luiz Felipe Pondé (born 1959)
- Miguel Reale (1910–2006) law theorist
- Paulo Alfeu Junqueira Duarte (1899–1984) archaeologist
- Paulo Freire (1921–1997) educator, political theorist
- Pedro Corrêa do Lago (born 1958) writer and curator
- Plínio Salgado (1901–1975) politician
- Raymundo Faoro (1925–2003) sociologist
- Rinaldo de Lamare (1910–2002) physician
- Roberto da Matta (born 1936) anthropologist
- Ruy Barbosa (1849–1923) political theorist
- Sérgio Buarque de Holanda (1902–1982) historian
- Tristão de Athayde (Alceu Amoroso Lima) (1893–1983) journalist
- Viscount of Taunay (1843–1899) historian
- Olavo de Carvalho (1947–2022) philosopher, journalist
- Vicente Ferreira da Silva (1918–1963) logician

== Playwrights ==
- Ariano Suassuna (1927–2014)
- Arnaldo Jabor (1940-2022)
- Artur Azevedo (1855–1908)
- Augusto Boal (1931–2009)
- Dias Gomes (1923–1999)
- Edla Van Steen (1936–2018)
- Gianfrancesco Guarnieri (1934–2006)
- Joaquim Cardozo (1897-1978)
- José Paulo Lanyi (born 1970)
- Leilah Assumpção (born 1943)
- Lúcio Cardoso (1912-1968)
- Luís Caetano Pereira Guimarães Júnior (1845–1898)
- Luiz Duarte (born 1956)
- Manuel de Araújo Porto-Alegre (1806–1879)
- Maria Clara Machado (1921–2001)
- Maitê Proença (born 1958)
- Luís Carlos Martins Pena (1815–1848)
- Nelson Rodrigues (1912–1980)
- Osman Lins (1924-1978)
- Oswald de Andrade (1890–1954)
- Pedro Bloch (1914–2004)
- Plínio Marcos (1935-1999)
- Qorpo Santo (Joaquim de Campos Leão) (1829–1883)
- Vianinha (1936–1974)

== Journalists ==
- Alberto Dines (1932–2018)
- Tristão de Athayde (1893–1983)
- Austregésilo de Athayde (1898-1993)
- Carlos Heitor Cony (1926–2018)
- Carlos Lacerda (1914–1977) journalist
- Crispim do Amaral (1858-1911)
- Cyro dos Anjos (1906-1994)
- Domício da Gama (1862-1925)
- Eliane Brum (born 1966)
- Elio Gaspari (born 1944)
- Elsie Lessa (1912–2000)
- Gilberto Dimenstein (1956–2020)
- Humberto de Campos (journalist) (1886-1934)
- Ignacio de Loyola Brandão (born 1936)
- Ivan Lessa (1935–2012)
- Kevin Einstein Barreto Poubel (1997–alive), grammarian
- José do Patrocínio (1853–1905)
- José Paulo Lanyi (born 1970)
- Maria Rita Kehl (born 1951)
- Marina Colasanti (1937–2025)
- Mino Carta (1933–1934)
- Olavo de Carvalho (1947–2022)
- Otto Lara Resende (1922-1992)
- Paulo Francis (1930–1967)
- Paulo Mendes Campos (1922-1991)
- Quintino Bocaiuva (1836–1912)
- Samuel Wainer (1912–1980)
- Sebastião Nery (1932–2024)
- Sergio Buarque de Hollanda (1902–1982)
- Sérgio Porto (1923-1968)
- Violante Atabalipa Ximenes de Bivar e Vellasco (1817-1875)
- Zuenir Ventura (born 1931)

== Poets ==
- Adalgisa Nery (1905–1980)
- Adélia Prado (born 1935), poet, chronicler
- Affonso Romano de Sant'Anna (1937–2025)
- Alberto de Oliveira (1859–1937)
- Alexei Bueno (born 1963)
- Alphonsus de Guimaraens (1870–1921)
- Alvarenga Peixoto (1744–1792)
- Álvares de Azevedo (1831–1852)
- Amália dos Passos Figueiroa (1845–1878)
- Américo Elísio (José Bonifácio de Andrada e Silva) (1763–1838)
- Ana Cristina César (1952–1983)
- António Pereira de Sousa Caldas (1762–1814)
- Adalcinda Camarão (1914–2005)
- Arnaldo Antunes (born 1960)
- Athos Damasceno Ferreira (1902-1975)
- Artur Azevedo (1855-1908)
- Augusto de Campos (born 1931)
- Augusto de Lima (1859–1934)
- Augusto dos Anjos (1884–1914)
- Bruno Tolentino (1940–2007)
- Basílio da Gama (1741–1795)
- Domingos Caldas Barbosa (1740–1800)
- Beatriz Francisca de Assis Brandão (1779–1868)
- Carlos Drummond de Andrade (1902–1987)
- Carpinejar (born 1972)
- Casimiro de Abreu (1839–1860)
- Cassiano Ricardo (1895–1974)
- Castro Alves (1847–1862)
- Cecília Meireles (1901–1964)
- Cláudio Manuel da Costa (1729–1789)
- Conceição Evaristo (born 1946)
- Colombina (1882–1963)
- Cora Coralina (1889–1985)
- Cruz e Sousa (1861–1898)
- Dante Milano (1899–1991)
- Décio Pignatari (1927–2012)
- Esmeralda Ribeiro (born 1959)
- Fabrício Carpi Nejar (born 1972)
- Ferreira Gullar (1930–2016)
- Frank Jorge (born 1966)
- Frederico Barbosa (born 1961)
- Ferreira Gullar (1930–2016)
- Gerardo Melo Mourão (1917-2007)
- Gilberto Mendonça Teles (1931–2024)
- Gonçalves Crespo (1846–1883)
- Domingos José Gonçalves de Magalhães (1811–1822)
- Gonçalves Dias (1823–1864)
- Gregório de Matos Guerra (1636–1695)
- Gustavo Dourado (born 1960)
- Haroldo de Campos (1929–2003)
- Helena Parente Cunha (1929–2023)
- Henriqueta Lisboa (1901–1985)
- Hilda Hilst (1930–2004)
- Jarid Arraes (born 1991)
- Joaquim Cardozo (1897-1978)
- João Cabral de Melo Neto (1920–1999)
- Jorge de Lima (1895–1953)
- José Américo de Almeida (1887-1980)
- Katya Chamma (born 1961)
- Lêdo Ivo (1924-2012)
- Lúcio Cardoso (1913–1968)
- Manoel de Barros (1916–2014)
- Manuel Bandeira (1886–1968)
- Manuel de Araújo Porto-Alegre (1806–1879)
- Marcia Theophilo (born 1941)
- Marçal Aquino (born 1958)
- Mário de Andrade (1893–1945)
- Mário Quintana (1906–1994)
- Martha Medeiros (born 1961)
- Menotti Del Picchia (1892–1988)
- Miriam Alves (born 1952)
- Murilo Mendes (1901–1975)
- Natalia Borges Polesso (born 1981)
- Paulo Mendes Campos (1922-1991)
- Olavo Bilac (1865–1918)
- Osório Duque-Estrada (1870–1927)
- Oswald de Andrade (1890–1954)
- Paulo Leminski (1944–1989)
- Raul Bopp (1898–1984)
- Rogério Skylab (born 1956)
- Ronald de Carvalho (1893–1935)
- Santa Rita Durão (1722–1784)
- Silva Alvarenga (1749–1814)
- Tânia Martins (1957–2021)
- Tomás Antônio Gonzaga (1744–1819)
- Torquato Neto (1944–1972)
- Valentim Magalhães (1859-1903)
- Vinícius de Moraes (1913–1980)
- Waly Salomão (1943–2003)

== Novelists ==
- A. C. Frieden (born 1966)
- Adolfo Caminha (1867–1897)
- Adonias Filho (1915–1990)
- Alberto Mussa (born 1961)
- Alice Dayrell Caldeira Brant (1880-1970)
- Aluísio de Azevedo (1857–1913)
- Ana Miranda (born 1951)
- Ana Paula Maia (born 1977)
- Andréa del Fuego (born 1975)
- André de Leones (born 1980)
- André Vianco (born 1976)
- Antônio Callado (1917–1997)
- Ariano Suassuna (1927–2014)
- Athos Damasceno Ferreira (1902-1975)
- Autran Dourado (1926–2012)
- Beatriz Bracher (born 1961)
- Bernardo Carvalho (born 1960)
- Bernardo Guimarães (Bernardo Joaquim da Silva Guimarães) (1825–1884)
- Caio Fernando Abreu (1948–1996)
- Carlos Heitor Cony (1926-2018)
- Cassandra Rios (1932-2002)
- Chico Buarque (born 1944)
- Clarice Lispector (1920–1977)
- Cristovam Buarque (born 1944)
- Cristóvão Tezza (born 1952)
- Cyro dos Anjos (1906–1994)
- Daniel Galera (born 1979)
- Diná Silveira de Queirós (1911-1982)
- Érico Veríssimo (1905–1975)
- Esther Largman (born 1934)
- Fernando Sabino (1923–2004)
- Fernando Gabeira (born 1941)
- Ferréz (born 1975)
- Geovani Martins (born 1991)
- Gerardo Melo Mourão (1917-2007)
- Guimarães Rosa (1908-1967)
- Ignacio de Loyola Brandão (born 1936)
- Itamar Vieira Junior (born 1979)
- Ivan Lessa (1935–2012)
- José Paulo Lanyi (born 1970)
- José Pereira da Graça Aranha (1868–1931)
- Graciliano Ramos (1892–1953)
- João Guimarães Rosa (1908–1967)
- Hilda Hilst (1930–2004)
- Holdemar Menezes (1921–1996)
- Ivan Ângelo (born 1936)
- Jô Soares (1938–2022)
- João Almino (born 1950)
- João Gilberto Noll (1946–2017)
- João Ubaldo Ribeiro (1941–2014)
- Joaquim Manuel de Macedo (1820–1882)
- Jorge Amado (1912–2001)
- José Américo de Almeida (1887–1980)
- José Cândido Carvalho (1914–1989)
- José de Alencar (1829–1877)
- José Geraldo Vieira (1897-1977)
- José J. Veiga (1915-1999)
- José Lins do Rego (1901–1957)
- José Mauro de Vasconcelos (1920–1984)
- Lima Barreto (1881–1922)
- Lourenço Mutarelli (born 1964)
- Lúcio Cardoso (1913–1968)
- Luisa Geisler (born 1991)
- Luis Fernando Verissimo (1936–2025)
- Lya Luft (1938–2021)
- Lygia Fagundes Telles (1923–2022)
- Joaquim Maria Machado de Assis (1839–1908)
- Manuel Antônio de Almeida (1831–1861)
- Márcia Denser (1954-2024)
- Marçal Aquino (born 1958)
- Marcelo Mirisola (born 1966)
- Márcio Souza (writer) (1946-2024)
- Marcos Rey (1925-1999)
- Maria Valéria Rezende (born 1942)
- Mário de Andrade (1893–1945)
- Marques Rebelo (1907-1973)
- Martha Medeiros (born 1961)
- Max Mallmann (1968–2016)
- Max Moreno (born 1968)
- Menalton Braff (born 1938)
- Moacyr Scliar (1937–2011)
- Nélida Piñon (1934-2022)
- Orígenes Lessa (1903–1986)
- Osman Lins (1924-1978)
- Oswald de Andrade (1890–1954)
- Pagu (1910-1962)
- Paola Giometti (born 1983)
- Patrícia Bins (1930-2008)
- Patrícia Melo (born 1962)
- Paulo Coelho (born 1947)
- Paulo Lins (born 1958)
- Paulo Scott (born 1966)
- Pedro Nava (1903–1984)
- Rachel de Queiroz (1910–2003)
- Raduan Nassar (born 1935)
- Sérgio Sant'Anna (1941–2020)
- Silviano Santiago (1936)
- Socorro Acioli (born 1975)
- Regina Rheda (born 1957)
- Roberto Drummond (1933–2002)
- Rubem Fonseca (1925–2020)
- Ruth Guimarães (1920-2014)
- Sérgio Sant'Anna (1941-2020)
- Tati Bernardi (born 1979)
- Urda Alice Klueger (born 1952)
- Valentim Magalhães (1859-1903)
- Veronica Stigger (born 1973)
- Victor Heringer (1988–2018)
- Viscount of Taunay (1843–1899)
- Antônio Gonçalves Teixeira e Souza) (1812–1861)
- Mário Palmério (1916–1996)
- Raul Pompéia (1863–1895)
- Godofredo Rangel (1884–1951)
- Marcos Rey (1925–1999) novelist
- José Rezende Filho (1929–1977)
- Júlio Ribeiro (1845–1890)
- José Sarney (born 1930)
- Bernardo Guimarães (1825–1884) (Bernardo Joaquim da Silva Guimarães)
- Betty Milan (born 1944)

== Literary critics ==
- Mário de Andrade (1893–1945)
- Oswald de Andrade (1890–1954)
- Alfredo Bosi (1936–2021)
- Antonio Candido (1918–2017)
- Otto Maria Carpeaux (1900–1978)
- Afrânio Coutinho (1911–2000)
- Araripe Júnior (1848–1911)
- Benedito Nunes (1929–2011)
- Bruno Tolentino (1940–2007)
- Wilson Martins (1921–2010)
- Tobias Barreto de Meneses (1839–1889)
- José Guilherme Merquior (1941–1991)
- Augusto Meyer (1902–1970)
- Fernandes Pinheiro (1826–1878)
- Silviano Santiago (1936)
- Sílvio Romero (1851–1914)
- Florêncio Carlos de Abreu e Silva (1839–1881) politician, critic
- José Veríssimo (1857–1916)

== Other writers ==
- Marcelo Cassaro (born 1970) rpg creator, comics writer
- Millôr Fernandes (1924–2012) journalist, poet, essayist
- Zélia Gattai (1916–2008) memoirist, children literature
- Alice Dayrell Caldeira Brant (Helena Morley) (1880–1970) memoirist
- Ricardo Semler (born 1959) business
- Gabriel Soares de Souza (1540–1591) naturalist
- Mateus Soares de Azevedo (born 1959) historian
- Malba Tahan (1895–1974) pen name for Júlio César de Mello e Souza children literature
- Adelmar Tavares (1888–1963) poet
- Franklin Távora (1842–1888) novelist
- Miguel Torres de Andrade (1926–1962) screenplay writer
- Fagundes Varela (1841–1875) poet
- António Vieira (1608–1697) preacher, historian
- Afonso Arinos de Melo Franco (1868–1916) short stories
- Austregésilo de Athayde (1898–1993) journalist
- Fabrício Carpi Nejar (born 1972) poet
- Aristides Fraga Lima (1923–c. 1996) children literature
- Henrique Maximiano Coelho Neto (1864–1934) novelist
- José do Patrocínio (1853–1905) journalist
- Afrânio Peixoto (1876–1947) novelist
- Afonso Schmidt (1890–1964) journalist
- Paulo Setúbal (1893–1937) poet, novelist
- Narbal Fontes (1902–1960) children's literature
- Eduardo Portella (1932–2017) critic
- Francisco de Sales Torres Homem (1822–1891)
- Ivan Ângelo (born 1936) novelist, journalist, short stories
- Paulo Fernando Craveiro (born 1934) romance writer, chronicalist, poet, journalist
- Juliana Cunha (born 1987), journalist, writer and university professor

== See also ==
- List of Brazilian women writers
- List of Latin American writers
- List of Brazilians
- Brazilian literature
