= Marcelo Mirisola =

Brazilian author (born 1966)

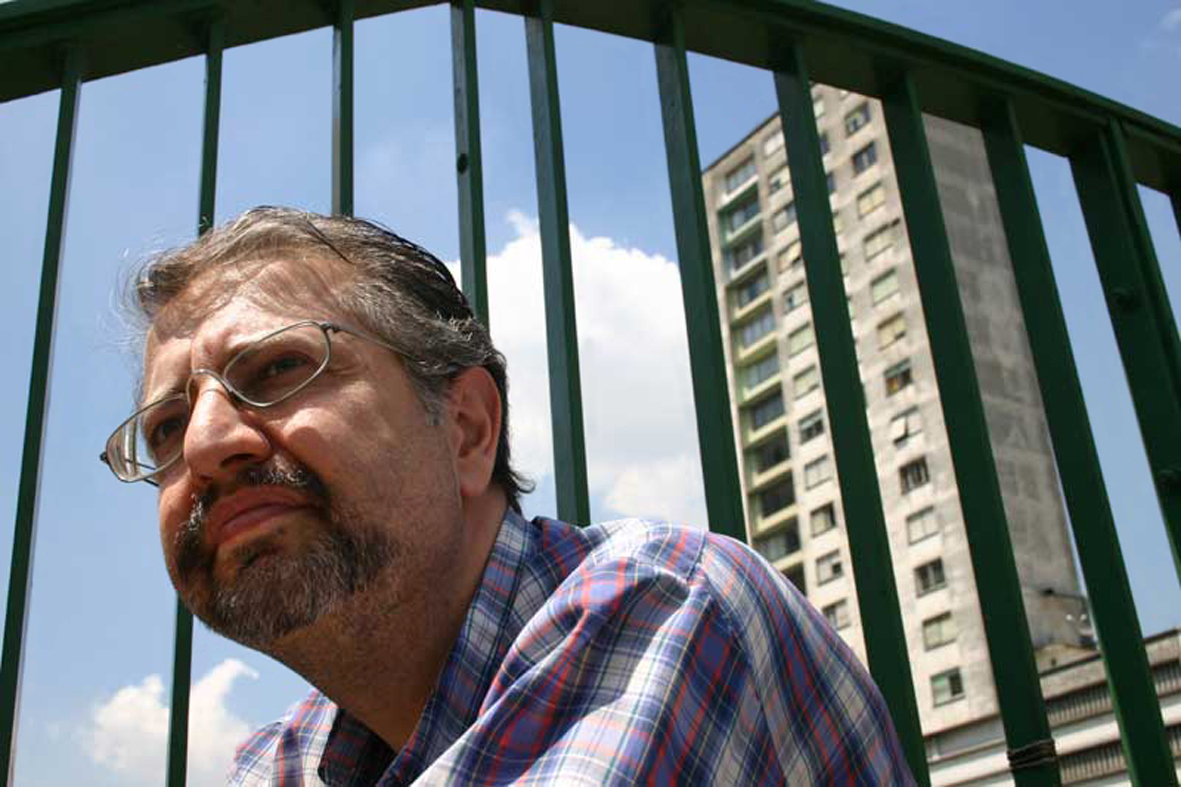
Marcelo Mirisola por João Marcondes

Marcelo Mirisola (born in São Paulo on May 9, 1966) is a contemporary Brazilian author. He is usually known for his scatological, innovative, and comic writing style, and for his ingenious interplay between autobiography and fiction. His literary production includes short stories, novels, chronicles, and theater pieces, and is influenced by authors like John Fante, Henry Miller, Charles Bukowski, Louis-Ferdinand Céline, and Marcia Denser, among others. He has collaborated regularly with Brazilian magazines, newspapers and websites. Mirisola holds a bachelor's degree in law, but has never practiced the profession. In 2020 Mirisola won a prize from the Programa de Ação Cultural (PROAC) as recognition for his outstanding body of work.

== Books published ==
- Fátima fez os pés para mostrar na choperia [short stories]. Editora Estação Liberdade, 1998. Preface by Maria Rita Kehl.
- O herói devolvido [short stories]. Editora 34, 2000. Adapted to the stage by Mário Bortolotto.
- O azul do filho morto [novel]. Editora 34, 2002.
- Bangalô [novel]. Editora 34, 2003.
- O banquete (as gostosas de Caco Galhardo revisitadas por Marcelo Mirisola) (with cartoonist Caco Galhardo). Editora Barracuda, 2003.
- Joana a contragosto [novel]. Record, 2005.
- Notas da arrebentação. Editora 34, 2005. Afterword by Ricardo Lísias.
- O homem da quitinete de marfim [chronicles]. Record, 2007.
- Proibidão. Demônio Negro, 2008.
- Animais em extinção [novel]. Record, 2008.
- Memórias da Sauna Finlandesa [short stories]. Editora 34, 2009.
- Charque [novel]. Editora Barcarolla, 2011. Afterword by Nilo Oliveira.
- Teco, o garoto que não fazia aniversário (with Furio Lonza). Editora Barcarolla, 2013. Illustrated by André Berger.
- O Cristo empalado [chronicles]. Editora Oito e Meio, 2013. Preface by Aldir Blanc.
- Paisagem em Campos do Jordão [drama]. Co-authored with Nilo Oliveira. E-galáxia, 2013 (e-book).
- Hosana na sarjeta [novel]. Editora 34, 2014.
- Paisagem sem reboco. Editora Oito e Meio, 2015.
- A vida não tem cura [romance]. Editora 34, 2016.
- Como se me fumasse [romance]. Editora 34, 2017.
- Quanto custa um elefante? [romance]. Editora 34, 2020.
- A fé que perdi no cães [short stories/chronicles]. Reformatório, 2021.
- Espeto corrido [romance], Editora Velhos Bárbaros, 2024.

== Works translated into English ==
- Joana Against My Will [Joana a contragosto]. Translated by Fal Azevedo. KBR Digital Editora, 2013.
