= Márcio Souza =

Márcio Souza may refer to:

- Márcio Souza (writer) (1946–2024), Brazilian writer and journalist
- Márcio de Souza (born 1975), Brazilian hurdler
- Márcio Souza (footballer) (born 1980), Brazilian footballer
