= Porto Alegre Book Fair =

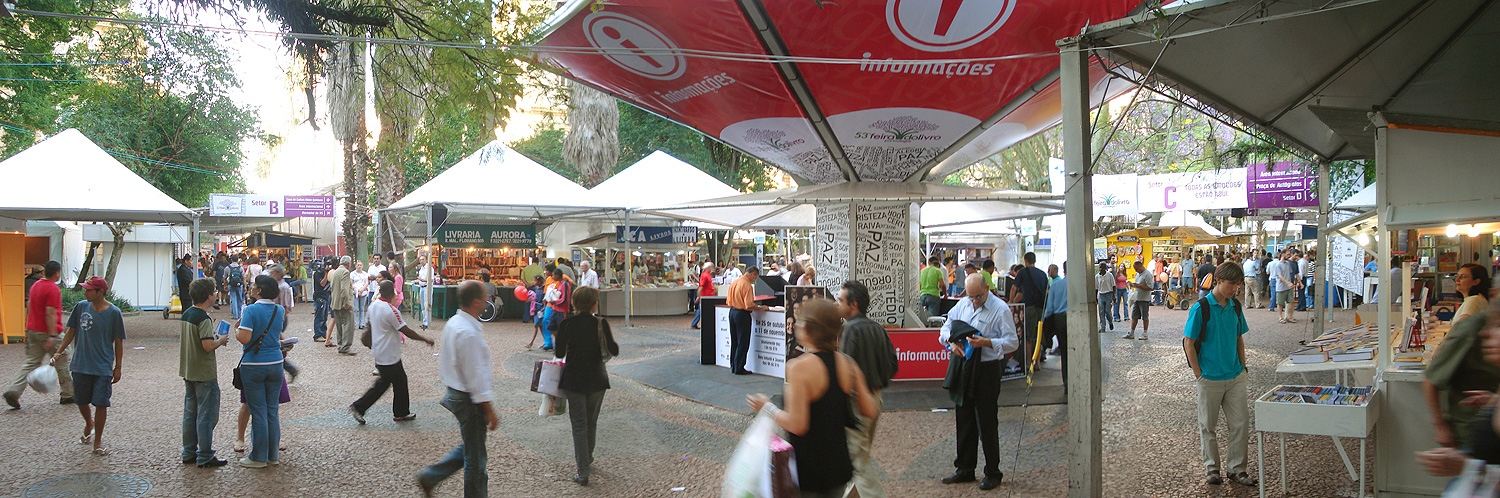
2007 Porto Alegre Book Fair - partial view

The Porto Alegre Book Fair is held annually since 1955, between late October to mid-November, in the downtown Porto Alegre, Brazil. It is the largest outdoors book fair in Latin America and the most important cultural event in the city. Nowadays, the Fair sprawls itself between the Alfândega Square, the Sepúlveda Avenue and some docks at Porto Alegre Harbor.

== History ==
The Porto Alegre Book Fair was an idea from Say Marques, then manager of the Diário de Notícias newspaper. Marques wanted to make books available to the majority of the citizens, as bookshops were deemed to be snobbish. The first edition of the Book Fair had 14 book stands and it was inaugurated on November 16, 1955.

== Patrons ==
There is a patron for the Fair since 1965. Selection of the Patron has two phases. In the first phase, each bookshop associated to the Rio-Grandense Book Chamber submits five names. In the second phase, the 10 most voted persons list is submitted to 88 persons arising from the cultural scene. The most voted shall be the Patron of the Porto Alegre Book Fair; in case of tie ballot, the eldest one shall be chosen.

1. 1965 - Alcides Maya
2. 1966 - João Simões Lopes Neto
3. 1967 - Alceu Wamosy
4. 1968 - Caldas Júnior
5. 1969 - Eduardo Guimaraens
6. 1970 - Augusto Meyer
7. 1971 - Manoelito de Ornellas
8. 1972 - Luís Vaz de Camões
9. 1973 - Darcy Azambuja
10. 1974 - Leopoldo Bernardo Boeck
11. 1975 - Athos Damasceno Ferreira
12. 1976 - Erico Verissimo
13. 1977 - Henrique Bertaso
14. 1978 - Walter Spalding
15. 1979 - Augustin Saint-Hilaire
16. 1980 - Moysés Vellinho
17. 1981 - Adão Juvenal de Souza
18. 1982 - Reynaldo Moura e Monteiro Lobato
19. 1983 - José Bertaso
20. 1984 - Maurício Rosenblatt
21. 1985 - Mario Quintana
22. 1986 - Cyro Martins
23. 1987 - Moacyr Scliar
24. 1988 - Alberto André
25. 1989 - Maria Dinorah
26. 1990 - Guilhermino César
27. 1991 - Luis Fernando Verissimo
28. 1992 - Paulo Fontoura Gastal
29. 1993 - Carlos Reverbel
30. 1994 - Nelson Boeck, Edgardo Xavier, Mário de Almeida Lima e Sétimo Luizelli
31. 1995 - Caio Fernando Abreu
32. 1996 - Lya Luft
33. 1997 - Luiz Antonio de Assis Brasil
34. 1998 - Patrícia Bins
35. 1999 - Décio Freitas
36. 2000 - Barbosa Lessa
37. 2001 - Armindo Trevisan
38. 2002 - Ruy Carlos Ostermann
39. 2003 - Walter Galvani
40. 2004 - Donaldo Schüler
41. 2005 - Friar Rovílio Costa
