= Carmen Dolores =

Carmen Dolores may refer to:

- Carmen Dolores (writer) (1852–1910), Brazilian poet and playwright
- Carmen Dolores (actress) (1924–2021), Portuguese actress
