= The Celebration (disambiguation) =

The Celebration (Danish: Festen) is 1998 Danish film directed by Thomas Vinterberg.

The Celebration may also refer to:

- Festen (play), the stage adaptation of the above film
- The Celebration (novel), a 1976 Brazilian novel by Ivan Ângelo

== See also ==
- Celebration (disambiguation)
