= Lúcia Benedetti =

Brazilian writer (1914–1998)

- Born: March 30, 1914; Mococa, São Paulo, Brazil
- Died: 1998; Rio de Janeiro
- Occupation: author

Lúcia Benedetti (March 30, 1914 in Mococa, São Paulo – 1998 in Rio de Janeiro) – was a Brazilian storyteller, writer of Children's Literature, novelist, playwright, chronicler and translator.

== Biography ==
Lucia Benedetti was born in Mococa and was the daughter of Dominique Benedetti (tailor / musician) and D. Leocadia M. Benedetti [2] As a student based in Rio de Janeiro she began writing short stories, essays and fictional stories for the magazine O Ensaio.

She graduated in pedagogy at the Bittencourt Silva School in Niterói.

In 1932 she received a degree in legal science, but she never practiced as an attorney.

While working as a teacher, she wrote for the newspaper A Noite. At this carioca newspaper, she met her husband, the journalist, playwright and writer, Raimundo Magalhaes Júnior, whom she married in 1933.

In 1942 the couple moved to the United States, where Magalhaes Júnior worked with Nelson Rockefeller and for the New York Times. Lucia Benedetti became a correspondent for the New York Times and worked for the paper until 1945.

At that time she wrote her first novel, Chico Vira Bicho e outras histórias, in collaboration with her husband. However, the literary work that marked her debut as a writer, was Entrada de serviço, published in 1942.

Lúcia Benedetti is considered the precursor of the theater for children in Brazil, with the O Casaco Encantado (1948), staged by Companhia Artistas Unidos.

The dramatic works of Lucia Benedetti were staged in countries like Portugal and Argentina.

Lucia Benedetti is the mother of Rosa Magalhães.

== Awards ==
- Prêmio Afonso Arinos – ABL by Vesperal com Chuva – 1950
- Prêmio de Teatro infantil – Prefeitura do Distrito Federal −1954
- Prêmio Arthur Azevedo – ABL – 1948 by O Casaco Encantado
- Prêmio A.B.C.T. – Revelação de Autor – 1949 by O Casaco Encantado
- Prêmio Teatro Infantil – Lei Jorge de Lima – 1952 by Joãozinho Anda Pra Trás

== Works ==
=== Theatre for Children and Youth ===
- O Casaco Encantado (1948)
- Simbita e o Dragão (1948)
- A Menina das Nuvens (1949)
- Branca de Neve(1950)
- Josefina e o Ladrão (1951)
- Joãozinho Anda Pra Trás (1952)
- Sinos de Natal (1957)
- Sigamos a Estrela
- Palhacinho Pimpão

=== Novels ===
- Chico Vira Bicho (1943)
- Entrada de Serviço (1942)
- Noturno sem Leito (1947)
- Três Soldados (1955)
- Chão Estrangeiro (1956)
- Maria Isabel, Uma Vida no Rio (1960)
- O Espelho Que Vê por Dentro (1965)

=== Theater ===
- O Banquete e a Farsa
- Amores de Celeste
- Figura de Pedro (1960)

=== Short stories ===
- O Inferno de Rosauro, tal como se deu(1960)
- Vesperal com Chuva(1950)
- Nove Histórias Reunidas(1956)

=== Bibliography ===
- COUTINHO, Afrânio; SOUSA, J. Galante de. Enciclopédia de literatura brasileira. São Paulo: Global; Rio de Janeiro: Fundação Biblioteca Nacional, Academia Brasileira de Letras, 2001: 2v.
