= Austregésilo de Athayde =

Brazilian writer and journalist (1898–1993)

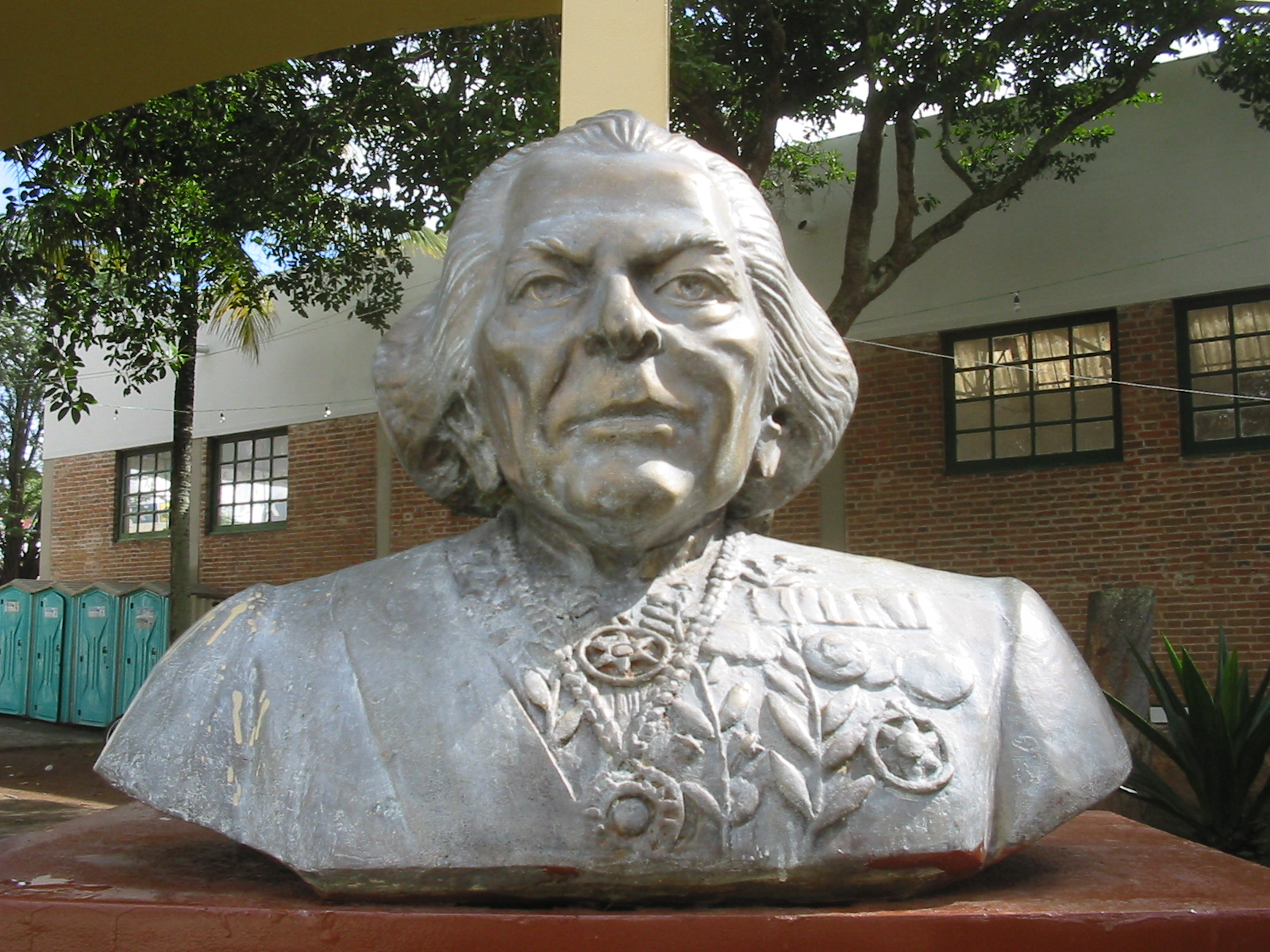
- The bust of Austregésilo de Athayde
- Born: September 25, 1898; Caruaru, Pernambuco, Brazil
- Died: September 13, 1993 (aged 94); Rio de Janeiro, Brazil
- Occupations: Writer, journalist
- Organization: Brazilian Academy of Letters
- Title: Occupant of the 8th Chair
- Term: 1958–1993
- Predecessor: Oliveira Viana
- Successor: Antônio Calado

Austregésilo de Athayde (September 25, 1898 – September 13, 1993) was a born in Caruaru, Pernambuco, Brazil. His career includes being invited by Assis Chateaubriand to work at a top position at the Diários Associados. Later he became an emblematic figure for the Brazilian Academy of Letters as he served as President of the organization for 34 years. He is also the Patron of the 4th chair of the Brazilian Academy of Fine Arts.

He was active in human rights causes in Brazil. Austregésilo de Athayde died on September 13, 1993, in Rio de Janeiro at age 94.

Preceded by Oliveira Viana	Brazilian Academy of Letters – Occupant of the 8th chair 1958–1993	Succeeded by Antônio Calado

Preceded by Elmano Cardim	President of the Brazilian Academy of Letters; 1959–1993	Succeeded by Abgar Renault
