= Eugênio Bucci =

University professor and researcher active in Brazil

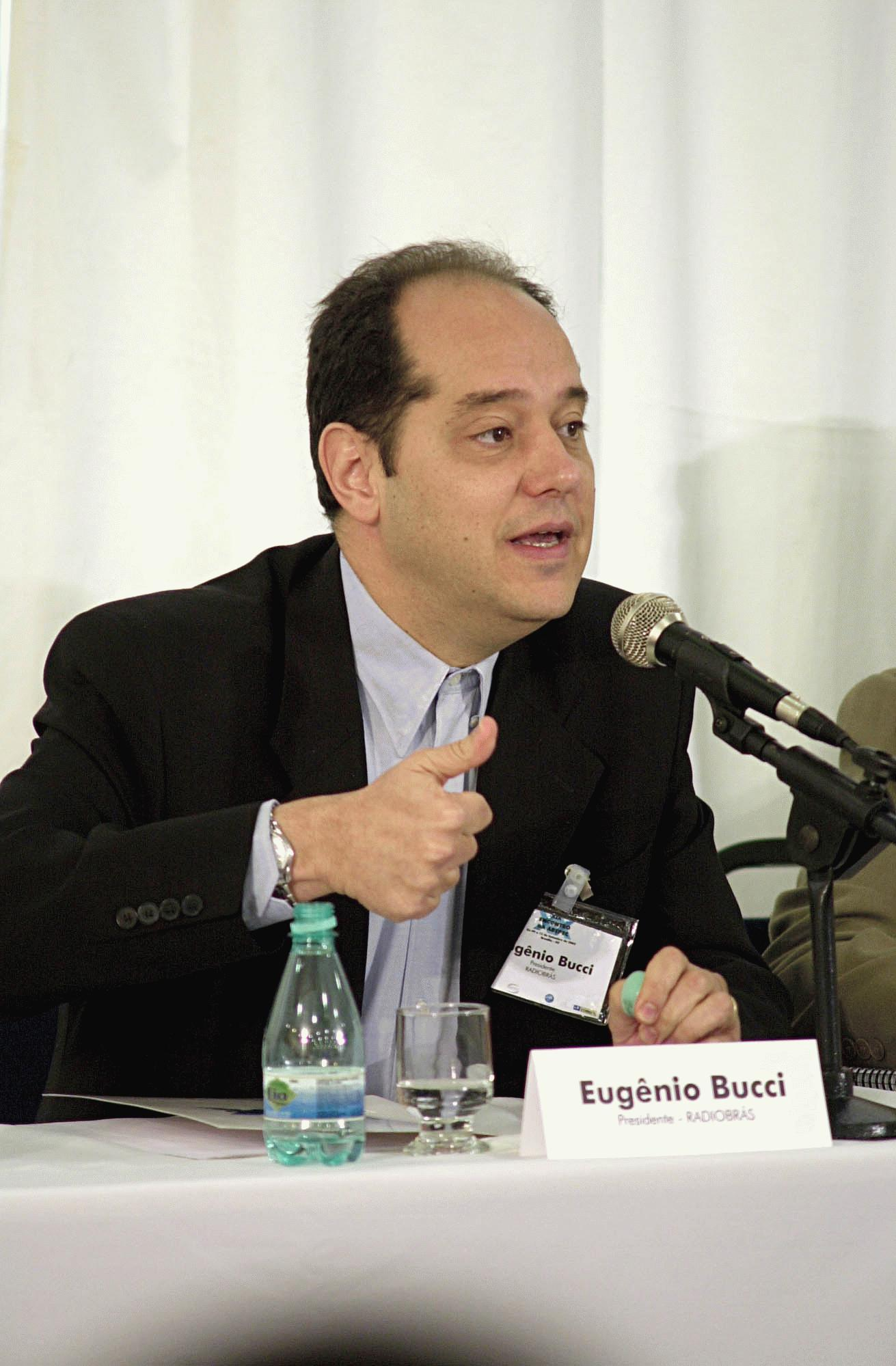
Eugênio Bucci, when he was president of Radiobras.

Eugênio Bucci (Orlândia) is a Brazilian journalist, known for his works at many Brazilian publications and also for his time as president of Radiobras (now working under the name Agência Brasil).

== Biography ==
Bucci graduated in Social Communication at Communication and Arts School of the University of São Paulo (ECA-USP) in 1982 and in Law at the same university.

In 1984, he was president of the Centro Acadêmico XI de Agosto, from USP. His campaign group was called "The Pravda", in allusion of the American newspaper The New York Times and the official soviet publication Pravda. The same group elected his successor, Fernando Haddad. Affiliated to the Worker's Party in the early 80s, he was the creator and first editor of the magazine Teoria e Debate, published by Fundação Perseu Abramo.

As a journalist, he was director of magazines such as Set, Superinteressante, Playboy and Quatro Rodas, culture and television critic in newspapers like (Folha de S.Paulo, O Estado de S. Paulo, Jornal do Brasil) and magazines as (Veja, Nova Escola and Sem Fronteiras), besides being Editorial Secretary of Editora Abril.

In 2002, he became doctor at Communication Science, Journalism area, at ECA-USP. He taught journalistic ethics at Faculdade Cásper Líbero in 2001 and 2002.

From January 2003 to April 2007, he directed Radiobrás (Empresa Brasileira de Comunicação S.A), leading the process of revitalization and repositioning of the company. His work was positively received by the press, the critics and other politicians and intellectuals, granting him national and international prizes.

After leaving the position at Radiobras, he became visiting professor at the Advanced Studies Institute of University of São Paulo. Currently, he is a member of the Curator Council of the Fundação Padre Anchieta, he works occasionally for O Estado de S. Paulo and with the website Observatório da Imprensa. In 2008, he became a professor at ECA-USP. In the same year, he became ombudsman of the "Jornal do Campus", a newspaper edited by the students from the second grade of the Journalist course of the university. In 2010, he became director of the new post-graduation course of journalism at ESPM, although he still works at USP.

Bucci has published many books, including a partnership with Maria Rita Kehl.

== Bibliography ==
- 2009: "A Imprensa e o Dever da Liberdade", Editora Contexto.
- 2008: "Em Brasília, 19 horas: a Guerra entre a Chapa-branca e o Direito à Informação no Primeiro Governo Lula", Editora Record.
- 2006: "Jornalismo Sitiado" (livro + DVD, com Sidnei Basile), estúdio Log On / Culturamarcas.
- 2004: "Videologias" (co-autora Maria Rita Kehl), Editora Boitempo.
- 2003: "Do B: Críticas para o Caderno B do Jornal do Brasil".
- 2001: "Sobre ética e imprensa", ed. Companhia das Letras.
- 2000: "A TV aos 50" (org.), Fundação Perseu Abramo.
- 1997: "Brasil em Tempo de TV", Editora Boitempo.
- 1993: "O Peixe Morre pela Boca: oito Artigos sobre Cultura e Poder", Scritta Editorial.
- 1982: "Um Balde" (compilation of poetry in collaboration with Guian de Bastos and Gomes Moor), edited by Masao Ohno.

Articles published in collective books

- 2007: "Comunicação pública: Estado, Mercado, Sociedade e Interesse Público" (org. Jorge Duarte), Editora Atlas.
- 2004: "Educação, Cidadania e Direitos Humanos" (org. José Sérgio Fonseca de Carvalho), Editora Vozes.
- 2002: "Comunicação na Pólis: Ensaios sobre Mídia e Política" (org. Clóvis de Barros Filho), Editora Vozes.
- 1996: "Libertinos, Libertários"; (org. Adauto Novaes), Companhia das Letras.
- 1993: "Diário da Viagem ao Brasil Esquecido", Scritta Editorial.
- 1992: "O Cinema dos Anos 80"; (org. Amir Labaki), Editora Brasiliense.
