= Athos Damasceno Ferreira =

Brazilian historian and writer (1902–1975)

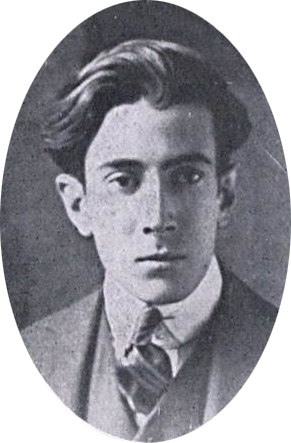
- Born: September 3, 1902; Porto Alegre
- Died: April 14, 1975 (aged 72); Porto Alegre
- Citizenship: Brazil
- Occupations: Writer, poet, literary critic, novelist, journalist, historian

Athos Damasceno Ferreira (Porto Alegre, September 3, 1902 – Porto Alegre, April 14, 1975) was a Brazilian poet, novelist, chronicler, translator, journalist, literary critic, and historian. He is considered the most important historian and chronicler of the city of Porto Alegre, is the founder of art historiography in the state of Rio Grande do Sul, and left a major contribution to the state historiography in the fields of culture and society, being a pioneer in the study of several themes. He was an advocate of the revaluation of regionalisms and a renowned poet and novelist, although being little remembered in this area.

== Career ==
He was the son of João Armando Damasceno Ferreira and Ana Dias da Silva. He did his early studies in religious schools, then studied languages with Ildefonso Gomes and humanities with Henrique Emílio Meyer. Damasceno began law school in Rio de Janeiro, but did not finish it, returning to Porto Alegre and becoming a state employee, working in the Secretariat of the Interior and later in the Secretariat of Education and Culture, where he retired, heading the Board of Letters. In 1917, he began working as a journalist and chronicler, collaborating in magazines and newspapers such as Máscara, Província de São Pedro, Eco do Sul, Ilustração Rio-Grandense, Tribuna Ilustrada, Gazeta do Povo, A Federação, Diário de Notícias, and Correio do Povo. He was also a translator for Editora Globo, one of the founders of the Eduardo Guimarães Foundation, which he came to chair, and a member of the Historical and Geographical Institute of Rio Grande do Sul and the State Folklore Commission.

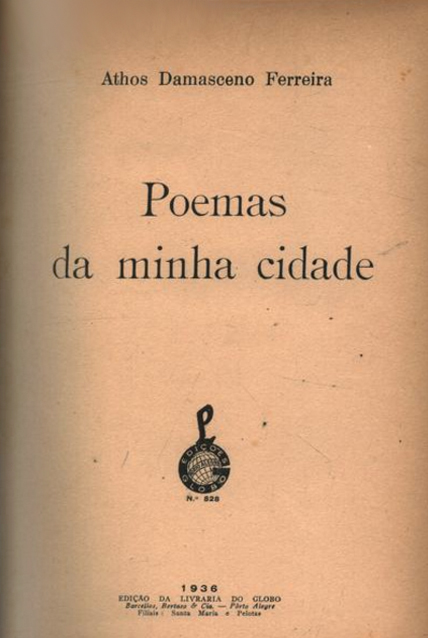
Cover of the book Poems of My City ("Poemas da Minha Cidade") (1936).

He spent his life in Porto Alegre, city in which he would be the most prolific historian and chronicler. Guilhermino César stated that he produced "the greatest writing of a single man about the capital of Rio Grande do Sul." He left essential works for the knowledge of the city's urban, cultural, and social evolution, besides addressing it in poetry and describing it in his short stories, novels, and his many chronicles. Important works in this group are Poemas da Minha Cidade (poems, 1936), Imagens Sentimentais da Cidade (chronicles, 1940), Jornais Críticos e Humorísticos de Porto Alegre no século XIX (cultural history, 1954), O Teatro em Porto Alegre no século XIX (theater in Porto Alegre in the 19th century, 1954), Palco, Salão e Picadeiro em Porto Alegre no Século XIX, (cultural history, 1956), Sociedades Literárias em Porto Alegre no Século XIX (cultural history, 1962), O Carnaval Porto-alegrense no Século XIX (cultural history, 1970), Colóquios com a minha Cidade (chronicles, 1974), and Imprensa Literária de Porto Alegre no Século XIX (cultural history, 1975).

However, his work was not limited to the state capital, being the pioneer in writing the general history of arts in Rio Grande do Sul with his classic Artes Plásticas no Rio Grande do Sul (1971), which goes to the primitive sources of art in the state and traces a wide panorama of its development until the 20th century, to this day a fundamental reference and, in its wide scope, not yet outdated, a work that was complemented by many separate articles. Other works worth mentioning are Apontamentos para os estudo da indumentária no Rio Grande do Sul (1957) and Imprensa Caricata do Rio Grande do Sul no século XIX (1962), pioneer studies of their kind; the varied contributions he left for the series Fundamentos da Cultura Rio-Grandense, published in several volumes between 1950 and 1960, dealing among other aspects with foreign travelers, the press, and clothing in Rio Grande do Sul, and O Teatro São Pedro na Vida Cultural do Rio Grande do Sul (with Herbert Caro, Guilhermino César, and Paulo Moritz, 1975).

== Works ==
=== History ===
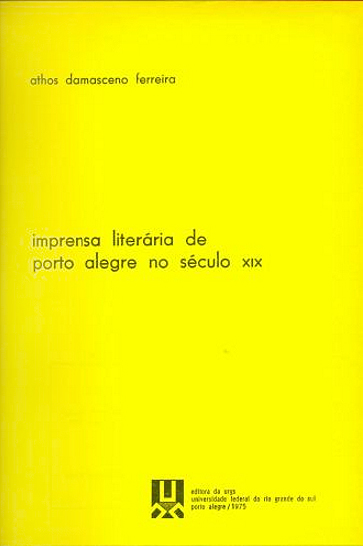
Cover of the book Imprensa Literária de Porto Alegre no Século XIX ("Porto Alegre Literary Press in the 19th Century") (1975).

According to Maria Beatriz Papaléo, Damasceno approached History in a peculiar perspective, rejecting to paint the past with mythologies and focusing on popular and humorous aspects, creating an original portrait of the city that recovered information little valued by other historians, being, in her words, a "meticulous craftsman of the daily life" who left a "popular inventory of the city". But this does not diminish the interest in his research, whose seriousness and competence are widely recognized. According to Joana Figueiredo, "as an intellectual ahead of his time, the author already knew that not all history is made of myth and grandeur, but of stitches and lines, knots and buttons – with a few beads and turbans to give it color and joy."

In works that are a mixture of chronicle and historical essay, such as Imagens Sentimentais da Cidade (1940, City of Porto Alegre Award) and Sacadas e Sacadinhas Porto-Alegrenses (1945), he interweaves his view of historian with his poetic side and his experience as a citizen, describing the changes in the urban scenario by the passage of time and the concomitant changes in the social meanings of the spaces and the lives of their occupants, focusing on the study of the "identity of the citizens of Porto Alegre, weakened by the advent of transformations in urban space in vogue from the 1940s," as Charles Monteiro stated, and at the same time denouncing, dismaying, the accelerated "erasing of the marks of the city of yesteryear," such as the old buildings, since he understood them as necessary elements for the preservation of a sense of identity for the locals. In his writing, as Gabriela Silva observed, Damasceno makes recurrent use of the first person and of interpellations to the reader, interweaving personal and collective memories and experiences to the critical analysis of history, a strategy "to refer the reader to a continuity between past and present, which leads to the strengthening of the identity that one wants to conform". This did not hinder his lucidity regarding aspects of the past that had changed, citing for example the poor sanitation conditions and precarious public transport of nineteenth-century Porto Alegre, distinguishing them from the aspects he deemed essential for the preservation of the essence of local identity.

Joana Figueiredo believes that "by historicizing the region and his city, in a sentimental and engaged way, Athos Damasceno inserts himself as an author committed to the past, its present and a future of the letters and arts of Rio Grande do Sul. His writing is at the same time memory and history, testimony and document". For Figueiredo, his role in the historiography of Rio Grande do Sul art compares to that of Vasari for the Italian arts of the Renaissance. "His interest in images, be they press caricatures, clothing and textiles, or missionary sculptures and the work of painters such as Pedro Weingärtner, attest to a founding role as a historian of art and visual culture on the scene of Porto Alegre and Rio Grande do Sul." However, despite being systematically used as a reference by contemporary art researchers, the author, his discourse, and his theoretical and ideological foundations still remain in the scope of academic studies. Figueiredo adds that "evidencing his contribution more expressively and shedding light on his written and intellectual production in his contribution to the historiography of art in Rio Grande do Sul is, today, more than a challenge and a necessity: But a settling of accounts with the History of Art of Rio Grande do Sul itself."

=== Regionalism ===
Part of Damasceno's work as a historian was linked to the gaucho theme, one of the characters that formed the state culture and a topic of great interest for the intellectuals of his generation. He was an articulator of concepts related to regionalism. At the time of his activity, the officialdom of Rio Grande do Sul was seeking to create a new cultural and political identity for the state and its people, at a time when the culture was becoming internationalized and the old cultural roots were dissolving. Damasceno took an active part in this process, analyzing which were the ruptures with the past and which were the continuities, and how they should be interpreted and re-signified, considering that modernity should necessarily be included in the new identity that was sought to be consolidated.

He did not deny the past, but demanded an impartial interpretation of the old sources and condemned those who tried to uncritically resurrect old ways of being and seeing the world, bypassing the social changes that the times had brought, the so-called saudosistas, who summed up Rio Grande do Sul people in the figure of the gaucho, then erected as the ideal image of the brave, free, and fighting man, and centered the state's cultural heritage on the past of the campeiro ("countryman") the military, and the Portuguese contribution. An excerpt from one of the articles, that fueled the polemic with Vargas Netto, is illustrative of his position:

"I must be honest, I don't really believe in our regionalism, especially regionalist poetry. [...] I still can't quite get my head around the 'living reality' that these works claim to reflect. [...] Rio Grande is no longer simply a vast cattle breeding ground. We possess a vast colonial zone, where men of other races, from other climates, work, suffer, and fight with us for the progress of the state, and where the highest and most seductive motifs of beauty are discovered and found, waiting for someone to interpret them. The largest portion of our population stirs in modern, bustling cities where the most intense dramas, the most disturbing tragedies, and the most audacious conquests, are there every day to inspire remarkable works of great repercussion. Why, then, should we live clinging to a nostalgic regionalism, which is already entirely exhausted, which is no longer our expression, which no longer represents anything in the complex of our social and moral environment? [...] Is it possible that if tomorrow we have to present ourselves outside of here, in France, in Industão, or in hell, we will have to carry a petiço [horse] on a halter, in the manner of an identity card or accredited credentials?"

=== Literature ===
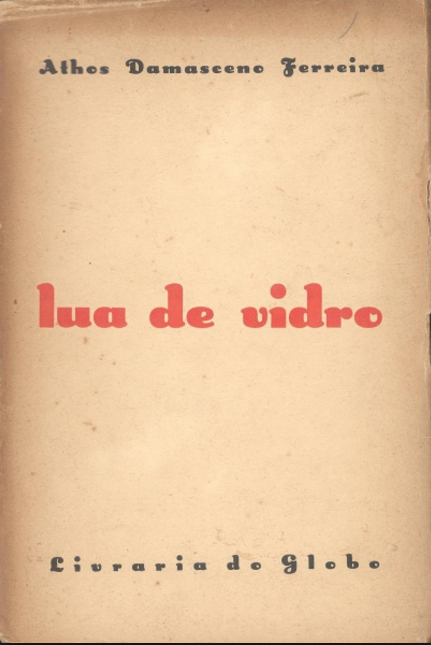
Cover of Lua de Vidro.

Early on, his poetic work was influenced by the Symbolism of poets such as Mallarmé, Rodenbach, and Verlaine and musicians such as Debussy, leaving two remarkable collections of pieces in this style. The first, Poemas do Sonho e da Desesperança (1925), is dedicated to his wife, Clara, and centers on the theme of mystical and spiritual love, tinged with melancholy, a sense of longing, and a desire to escape from reality, which was offset by hope and pity. The second, Poemas de Minha Cidade (1936), is one of the culminating points of Symbolism in Gaúcho (Rio Grande do Sul) lands, creating the same misty, crepuscular, and subjective atmospheres as the other work, but also adding touches of irony and humor, and revealing, as Cristiano Fretta states, "an artist aware of the universality of literature but extremely attached to the (provincial) environment in which he found himself", "which means that the artists of the time were clearly aware of what the city was then". In the meantime, he had experimented with Modernism in the collection Lua de Vidro (1930), which likewise remains one of the main Rio Grande do Sul contributions to this school.

Damasceno was part of the group of intellectuals and artists that frequented the Café Colombo, in his generation one of the main forums for ideological, political, literary, and aesthetic debates in the city, although, according to Paulo de Gouvêa's testimony, he did not occupy a prominent position in the group: "He did not warm the place. [...] He arrived, gave a "buenas" ("hello") to the group, talked a little, and went on – to Cacus' cave, to the Fujiama ridge, to the lands of the Blue Bird? No one knew by what strange paths the poet was going, towards the undefined port where he anchored his boat." Nevertheless, for Cristiano Fretta his production is representative of the interests of the group, especially by the approach he takes to Porto Alegre and the adoption in his literary work of aesthetic principles common to all. He was like the others, as Regina Zilberman believes, engaged in the process of renewal of local literature through the incorporation of novelties introduced by the modern avant-garde, but preserving ties with the past and previous literature.

An excerpt from the poem Praça da Harmonia, about the old square which was a meeting place for local poets and was dismantled to make room for the Mauá Pier, serves as an illustration of the first stage:

"What is it of poets that one day, O old dead square

you intoxicated with the kind filter of your moonlight, of your caressing shadows, of your confiding silences?

Sad voices of yesteryear, I know, many have gone silent forever... And today, even if you, nothing remains for us... [...]

You are a desert all alone... No one looks for you anymore! Not even the wandering ghost of longing ... Not even the wandering ghost of longing comes to roam your avenues at night...

But the autumn haze dampens you at sunset, and, opening upon you the great still shadows still gives you the illusion, under the falling leaves,

that the city mourns the garden of its poets..."

In the field of prose literature, the novels Moleque: novelinha de arrabalde (1938) and Menininha (1941) are highlights, as well as the short story book Persianas Verdes: contos e manchas (1967), which set prosaic characters in the humble settings of the streets and houses of the periphery, in the bars and popular parties, leading often miserable, sad and meaningless lives, lost in unsatisfied dreams of freedom and justice and excluded from the bright hustle and bustle and big events of urban centers, a theme that knew great vogue at the time. The author acknowledged his special debt to Eça de Queiroz: "None of us has escaped the influence of Eça de Queiroz. There is no use in wrinkling our noses, pretending to hide what is so clear. A writer much more Brazilian than Portuguese, he was to us a kind of older brother, to be admired and imitated. In our literature there was much of his monocle." Erico Veríssimo held his artistic work in high regard, praising his "sharp, right-handed prose, [that] knows how to tell a story and make a poem. A skillful verbal juggler, he can give novel interest to the most insipid and heavy subjects." He was also a renowned literary critic.

== Legacy ==
His historiographical contribution and his position as a founder of the history of art in Rio Grande do Sul and one of the main historians of Porto Alegre and Rio Grande do Sul remains significant. In the words of Celso Luft, "his production in this field is precious, being a cultured author, of great analytical and interpretative capacity who, handling a clean and fluent prose, left books at the same time instructive and pleasant to read."

On the other hand, his poetic and literary production, "widely spread and admired," which gave him national renown while he lived and made Carlos Reverbel define him as a poet of great skill is now forgotten. According to Luís Augusto Fischer, he was "one of the great writers from South Rio Grande do Sul overshadowed by the remarkable literary quality of Erico Verissimo."

His complete work and 28 folders of research material and correspondence are deposited at the Historical and Geographical Institute of Rio Grande do Sul. Armando Albuquerque put many of his poems into music. In 1975 he was chosen as the patron of the Porto Alegre Book Fair, a city that honored him by naming a square after him.

== See also ==
- History of Rio Grande do Sul

== Bibliography ==
- Silva, Gabriela Correa da (2011). "O Regionalismo Sul-Rio-Grandense de Athos Damasceno e sua Polêmica com Vargas Netto (1932)" (PDF). UFRGS.
- Fretta, Cristiano (2010). "As representações de Porto Alegre em "Poemas de minha cidade" de Athos Damasceno Ferreira" (PDF). UFRGS.
