= Paola Giometti =

Brazilian young adult and fantasy author (born 1983)

- Born: São Paulo, Brazil
- Occupation: Novelist
- Writing career
- Period: 1994–present
- Genres: Young adult fiction, Fantasy
- Notable work: O Destino do Lobo (The Destiny of the Wolves)

Paola Giometti is a Brazilian young adult and fantasy author known for the novels O Destino do Lobo (The Destiny of the Wolves) and Noite ao Amanhecer (Night At Dawn), which she published with Cassandra Rios.

== Biography ==
Giometti was born in the city of São Paulo, Brazil, in 1983. She studied Biology at Methodist University of São Paulo. In 2013, she gained a Master’s degree in Pharmacology from Federal University of São Paulo, and a PhD in Natural Sciences.

In 1994, she published Noite ao Amanhecer (Night At Dawn) at the age of eleven

Giometti is the author of three books and has organized and worked collaboratively on several collections of short stories. The Destiny of the Wolves is her second solo book and was released by Giz Editorial in 2014. Together with O Código das Águias (The Code of the Eagles) and O Chamado dos bisões (The Call of the Bison), it makes up the Fábulas da Terra (Tales of the Earth) series, which was published by Elo Editorial in 2020. In this series, she combines both her academic and real-life experiences to portray nature as accurately as possible.

Drako and the Elite of the Golden Dragon's Elite, a book about a dragon and a fly's friendship that teaches young people to overcome pessimism and issues with self-esteem, was released in 2018 by Lendari publisher, Giometti. It further considers and normalizes differences.

In July 2020, Giometti released her sixth book, Symbiosa e a Ameaça no Ártico (Symbiosa and the Threat in the Arctic), by Elo Editorial. She was nominated for the International Recognition Award for Brazilian Literature 2020, held by Focus Brasil NY, which was delivered during the World Meeting of Brazilian Literature, between 9 and 12 September 2020. Her first book published in English is The Destiny of the Wolves, being the first in the Tales of the Earth series.

Giometti was honored by the Brazilian embassy in Oslo in 2018 for her work in youth literature. The author lives in Tromsø, Norway.
