= Betty Milan =

Brazilian psychoanalyst and writer

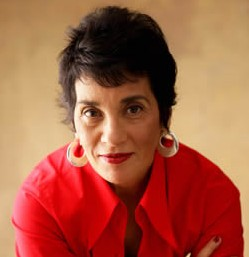
- Born: Elizabeth Milan Mangin; 5 August 1944 (age 80); São Paulo, Brazil
- Occupations: Psychoanalyst; essayist; novelist; playwright

Elizabeth Milan Mangin (born 5 August 1944), known as simply Betty Milan, is a Brazilian Lacanian psychoanalyst who became an essayist, a novelist and a playwright.

== Early life ==
Elizabeth Milan Mangin was born São Paulo on 5 August 1944. Her parents were children of immigrants from Lebanon. She spent her early childhood in Vila Esperança, a neighbourhood on the outskirts of São Paulo. At 18, she entered the Faculty of Medicine of the University of São Paulo, with the intention of becoming a psychiatrist. Taking the opportunity to observe courses at the Faculty of Philosophy, Science and Letters, she met French intellectuals, such as Michel Serres and Michel Foucault and, through them, became interested in French culture. Graduating in 1968 she took internships in Brazil and also in Scotland in a directed therapeutic community under psychiatrist Maxwell Jones. She also studied psychodrama and psychoanalysis. In December 1969 she went to study with Zerka T. Moreno at the Moreno Institute in Beacon, New York. At the age of 29, she defended a doctoral thesis in psychiatry at the Faculty of Medicine of the University of São Paulo and, a year later, in 1974, went to France to undergo therapy with and subsequently work with Jacques Lacan, for whom she became a translator and assistant at the University of Paris VIII. In 2021 she published Lacan ainda: Testemunho de uma análise, about her experiences with Lacan.

== Career ==
Shortly before finishing her training in psychoanalysis and returning to Brazil, Milan wrote her first novel, O Sexphuro. Her work with Lacan resulted, in 1991, in the novel O Papagaio e o Doutor (The Parrot and the Doctor), which was translated into French and Spanish. In Brazil she settled in Rio de Janeiro, conducted research on the Rio Carnival and taught at the Colégio Freudiano, an association founded in 1975 by her together with the psychoanalyst Magno Machado Dias. The research carried out on the samba schools of Rio de Janeiro, in 1988, led to Os bastidores do Carnaval (The Backstories of Carnival), which was the first time that carnival artists had been taken seriously at the intellectual level. As part of her research she met the Carnival director, Joãosinho Trinta, who helped her to realise the importance of play within the Brazilian culture. Her subsequent essay O que é o amor (What is love), which relates play to love, became extremely controversial. Later, one of the chapters in the book was adapted for the theatre, under the name, Paixão (Passion).

Milan returned to Paris in 1985 to live and write O Papagaio e o Doutor. During this period, she also wrote other papers, including the essay, O País da Bola (The Country of the Ball). Translated and published in France during the 1998 World Cup, the book was well received by the French press. From 1991 to 1994, she wrote A paixão de Lia (Lia's passion), a novel that merges eroticism and lyricism. Before the release of the French version of O Papagaio eo Doutor, she wrote a series of 29 stories about Paris, which were first published in São Paulo's Jornal da Tarde, and later collected in a book. From 1993, she started doing special interviews for Folha de S. Paulo, a newspaper with which she has collaborated since 1980. This gave her the opportunity to interview writers, artists and thinkers such as Nathalie Sarraute, Octavio Paz, Michel Serres, Jacques Derrida, and Françoise Sagan. The interviews were gathered in the book A Força da Palavra (The Power of the Word) in 1996. Folha de S. Paulo then commissioned ten interviews with leading European intellectuals, which were brought together in O Seculo (The Century), which received an award from the Associação Paulista dos Críticas de Arte in 1999.

In 2002, Milan began to use the internet to communicate, with question-and-answer sessions. She adapted A paixão de Lia for the theatre. In November 2003, she released the novel O Amador Brasileiro (The Brazilian Amateur). This was also adapted for the stage and premiered in August 2004. In 2005, she wrote the play Brasileira de Paris, which was first performed on 8 March 2006, International Women's Day. She became a columnist for Folha de S. Paulo in 2005, answering questions about love, sex and death. In 2007 she became a columnist for the online version of the weekly magazine, Veja. In 2012, she wrote A vida é um theatre (Life is a theatre), which was staged at the Teatro da Livraria da Vila in São Paulo. In 2014, she represented contemporary Brazilian literature at the Miami International Book Fair in the USA. In 2016, she published A Mãe Eterna (The Eternal Mother), a novel about the transition from the condition of a daughter to that of a mother's mother, focusing on extreme old age. She published Diaspora, Psychoanalysis and Literature in Brazil, and gave a series of conferences in the United States in 2018 on this topic, speaking at Georgetown University, Johns Hopkins University and the New York School of Art. Milan'’s most recent novel is Baal, which draws on her Lebanese roots, and in 2019, she was honoured by the Minister of Foreign Affairs of Lebanon "for her contribution to the country of her ancestors".
