= Adrino Aragão =

Brazilian short-story writer

Adrino Aragão (Adrino Aragão de Freitas), (born 1936 in Manaus, State of Amazon, Brazil), is a Brazilian short-story writer. In the 1970's And 1980's, he was a prominent Desed magazine (Brasília) and BIP – Boletim de Informação ao Pessoal, do Banco do Brasil S.A. (Bank of Brazil) reporter. BIP had a circulation of over 100.000 every week. Adrino Aragão wrote several reviews of new Brazilian books. After his retirement, he wrote essays on Comparative Literature and Literary Theory for Jornal do Brasil/Rio de Janeiro and academicals publications.

He is recognized by his focus on the fables and traditional stories. He wrote on the short stories of Jorge Luis Borges. His book O Champanhe (Champagne) focus on the study of the theatre of Anton Chekhov.

He lives in Brasília D.F. and he participated as Member of Committees for granting Literary Prizes in Manaus and in Brasília D.F., Brazil. He is a member of the União Brasileira de Escritores (The Writers's Union of Brazil) and wrote several essays on Clube da Madrugada, an amazonian avant-garde movement formed in 1954 by Jorge Tufic, Farias de Carvalho, Luiz Bacellar, and other Brazilian poets and artists.

He is a regular articulist of O Pioneiro magazine (Brasília D.F.), edited by the poet and journalist Heitor Humberto de Andrade.

== Books ==
- Roteiro dos vivos (1972)
- Inquietação de um feto (1976)
- As três faces da esfinge (1985)
- A verdadeira festa no céu (1991)
- Tigre no espelho (1992)
- Os filhos da esfinge (1998)
- No dia em que Manuelzão se encantou (2000)
- História da Infância (1996)
- Conto, não-conto e outras inquietações (2006)
- A cabeça do peregrino cortada em triunfo pelos filhos do Cão (2006)
- O champanhe (2007)

== Sources ==
- COUTINHO, Afrânio e SOUZA, J. Galante de. Enciclopédia de Literatura Brasileira, Vol. 1, Ministério da Cultura/Fundação Biblioteca Nacional-DNL (Departamento Nacional do Livro) /Global Editora/Academia Brasileira de Letras, São Paulo, 2001 (Topics "Adrino Aragão" e "Clube da Madrugada").
- TUFIC, Jorge. A nova geração de artistas e escritores do Amazonas. Jornal de Letras (Rio de Janeiro), maio de 1966, p. 8.
