= Veronica Stigger =

Brazilian writer and journalist (born 1973)

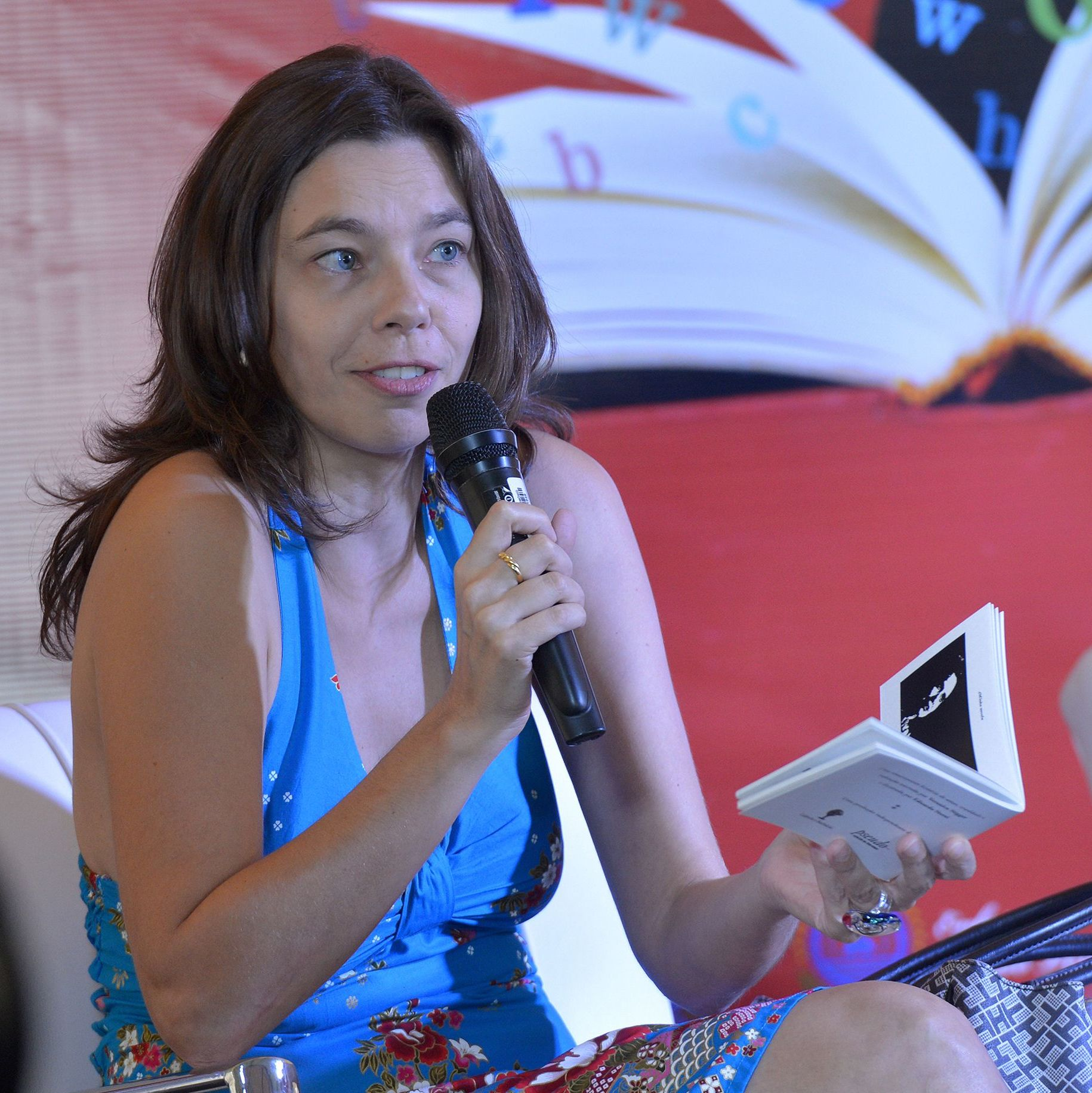
Veronica Stigger

Veronica Stigger (born 1973) is a Brazilian writer, journalist and art critic.

Stigger was born in Porto Alegre. The author of ten books to date, she has won several prizes including the Premio São Paulo and the Prêmio Açorianos. She was one of the authors included in the Bogota39 group of young Latin American writers.

== Selected works ==
- O trágico e outras comédias - Angelus Novus, 2003; 7Letras, 2004
- Gran cabaret demenzial - Cosac Naify, 2007
- Os anões - Cosac Naify, 2010
- Opisanie swiata - Cosac Naify, 2013
- Sul - Editora 34, 2016.
