= Ignacio de Loyola Brandão =

Brazilian writer (born 1936)

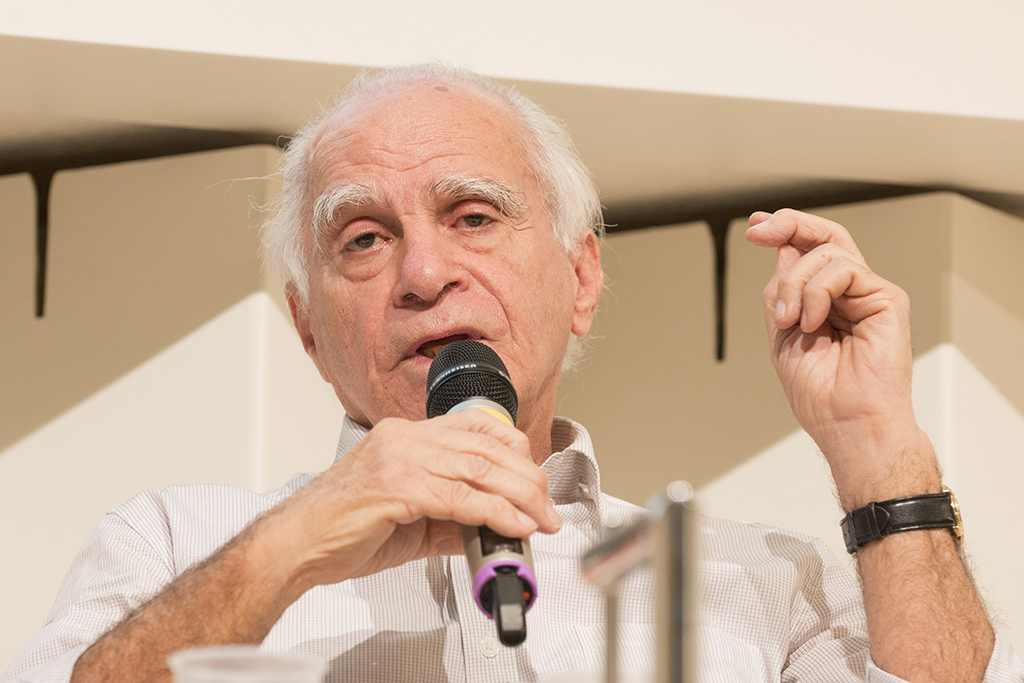
- Born: July 31, 1936 (age 90) Araraquara, Brazil
- Genre: Science fiction
- Notable works: Zero; O Menino que Vendia Palavras
- Notable awards: Prêmio Machado de Assis; Juca Pato Prize; Order of Ipiranga

Ignácio de Loyola Brandão (born 31 July 1936) is a Brazilian writer, perhaps best known as the author of the dystopian science-fiction novel Zero, the story of Brazil in the 1960s under a totalitarian regime. In 2008, he was awarded the Prêmio Jabuti for his novel O Menino que Vendia Palavras (The Boy who Sold Words).

== Biography ==
His father was a railroad worker in Araraquara, where he was born and raised. In his teens, he wrote movie reviews for a trade paper called A Folha Ferroviária (The Railroad Folio). In 1956, he relocated to São Paulo, the state capital, where he worked for Ultima Hora (Last Hour), a left leaning tabloid periodical.

His first book, Depois do Sol (After the Sun, a short story collection) appeared in 1965. Despite the censorship that was imposed after the 1964 coup d'état, he was also able to publish his novel Bebel Que a Cidade Comeu (Bebel Eaten by the City) in 1968, but the more critical and controversial Zero, completed in 1969, was first published in Europe in 1974, in an Italian translation, and was banned in Brazil until 1979.

From 1972 to 1976, he served as the first editor of Planeta, a magazine devoted to parapsychology, UFOs and ecology. He was a guest at the DAAD Artists-in-Berlin Program during the 1981/82 season. Since 1990, he has been an editor for the Brazilian edition of Vogue magazine. In 2005, he began working for the journal O Estado de S. Paulo. In 2016, the Brazilian Academy of Letters awarded him the Prêmio Machado de Assis for his collected works. He holds seat number 37 at the Academia Paulista de Letras and was elected for the Brazilian Academy of Letters in 2019.

In addition to his literary awards, the State of São Paulo presented him with the Order of Ipiranga in 2010.

== Selected bibliography ==
- Depois do Sol (1965)
- Bebel Que a Cidade Comeu (1968)
- Zero (1974). Trans. Ellen Watson (Dalkey Archive, 2003)
- Dentes ao Sol (1976). Teeth Under the Sun, trans. Cristina Ferreira-Pinto Bailey (Dalkey Archive, 2007)
- Pega ele, Silêncio (1976)
- Não Verás País Nenhum (1981). And Still the Earth, trans. Ellen Watson (Avon Books, 1985; Dalkey Archive, 2013)
- É gol (1982)
- O Beijo Não Vem da Boca (1985)
- O Ganhador (1987)
- O Anjo do Adeus (1995). The Good-Bye Angel, trans. Clifford E. Landers (Dalkey Archive, 2011)
- O Anônimo Célebre (2002). Anonymous Celebrity, trans. Nelson Vieira (Dalkey Archive, 2009)
- A Altura e a Largura do Nada (2006)
- O Menino que Vendia Palavras (2008)
- Desta Terra Nada Vai Sobrar, A Não Ser O Vento Que Sopra Sobre Ela (2018)

== Awards and honours ==
- 1968: Prêmio Especial do I Concurso Nacional de Contos do Paraná for Pega ele, Silêncio
- 1976: Melhor Ficção for Zero, Fundação Cultural do Distrito Federal
- 1984: Prêmio IILA, do Instituto Ítalo-Latino-Americano, for Não Verás País Nenhum, published in Italian
- 1988: Prêmio Pedro Nava, da União Brasileira de Escritores e Prêmio da Associação Paulista de Críticos de Arte (APCA) in the category "Melhor Romance", for O Ganhador
- 2007: Prémio Fundação Biblioteca Nacional, como melhor livro infanto-juvenil, for O Menino que Vendia Palavras
- 2008: Prêmio Jabuti de (melhor ficção) for O Menino que Vendia Palavras
- 2011: Chosen to serve as a member of the Final Jury for the São Paulo Prize for Literature
- 2016: Prêmio Machado de Assis da Academia Brasileira de Letras, for his body of work
