= Antônio Callado =

Brazilian journalist (1917–1997)

Antônio Callado (26 January 1917 – 28 January 1997) was a Brazilian journalist, playwright, and novelist. Born in Niterói, Rio de Janeiro, Callado studied law, then worked as a journalist in London for the BBC's Brazilian Service from 1941 to 1947. Callado began writing fiction in the 1950s. His first novel, A assunção de Salviano (The Assumption of Salviano), was published in 1954, and his last, O homem cordial e outras histórias (Men of Feeling and Other Stories), came out in 1993. Quarup (1967) is regarded as his most famous work. Callado has received literary prizes that include the Golfinho de Ouro and the Prêmio Brasília. He died in Rio de Janeiro, aged 80.

== Works ==
- O fígado de Prometeu, play (1951)
- A assunção de Salviano, novel (1954)
- A cidade assassinada, play (1954)
- Frankel, play (1955)
- A madona de cedro, novel (1957)
- Retrato de Portinari, biography (1957)
- Pedro Mico, play (1957)
- Colar de coral, play (1957)
- O tesouro de Chica da Silva, play (1962)
- Forró no Engenho Cananéia, play (1964)
- Quarup, novel (1967) which was the source of the film Kuarup
- Bar Don Juan, novel (1971)
- Reflexos do baile, novel (1976)
- Sempreviva, novel (1981)
- A expedição Montaigne, novel (1982)
- A revolta da cachaça, play (1983)
- Concerto carioca, novel (1985)
- Memórias de Aldenham House, novel (1989)
- O homem cordial e outras histórias, short stories (1993)

== See also ==
- Literature of Brazil
- List of Brazilian writers
