= Francisco Marins =

Brazilian writer

Francisco Marins (November 23, 1922 - April 10, 2016) was a Brazilian writer. He was the author of a series of books for children, about the Taquara-Póca farm. Marins also writes historic novels set in the colonial Brazilian hinterland. He was born in Pratânia, Estado de São Paulo, which was at the time part of Botucatu.

Marins has sold more than 5,000,000 books, which have been translated into fifteen languages, and is the only Brazilian writer in the European collection Delphin, that features classics of children's literature around the world.

Francisco Marins is a member of the Academia Paulista de Letras.

== Books for children ==
- Nas Terras do Rei Café (Taquara-Póca series)
- Os Segredos de Taquara-Póca (Taquara-Póca series)
- O Coleira Preta (Taquara-Póca series)
- Gafanhotos em Taquara-Póca (Taquara-Póca series)
- Viagem ao Mundo Desconhecido
- A Aldeia Sagrada (Vagalume series)
- O Mistério dos Morros Dourados (Vagalume series)
- A Montanha das Duas Cabeças (Vagalume series)
- Em Busca do Diamante (Vagalume series)
- Canudos (Vagalume series)
- O Sótão da Múmia (Vagalume series)
- Expedição aos Martírios (Roteiro dos Martírios series)
- Volta à Serra Misteriosa (Roteiro dos Martírios series)
- O Bugre do Chapéu de Anta (Roeteiro dos Martírios series)

== Novels ==
- Clarão na Serra
- Grotão do Café Amarelo
- ... E a Porteira Bateu!
- Atalho Sem Fim
