= Martha Medeiros =

Brazilian writer and journalist

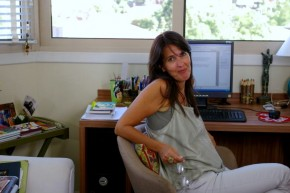
- Born: August 20, 1961 (age 65); Porto Alegre, Brazil
- Occupations: Writer and journalist
- Writing career
- Language: Portuguese
- Years active: 1985–present
- Genres: Novel, chronic
- Notable works: A Morte Devagar, (2000); Divã, (2002)

Martha Medeiros (born August 20, 1961, in Porto Alegre) is a Brazilian writer and journalist. She works as columnist of the Zero Hora and O Globo newspapers.

== Biography ==
Born in Porto Alegre in 1961, she's the daughter of José Bernardo Barreto de Medeiros and Isabella Matos de Medeiros. She graduated in 1982 at the Pontifical Catholic University of Rio Grande do Sul (PUCRS) in Porto Alegre and became journalist for the newspaper Zero Hora of Porto Alegre and O Globo of Rio de Janeiro.

She moved for nine months in Chile, and she began to write poems. Coming back to Porto Alegre, she began writing as a journalist also continuing her literary way.

A Morte Devagar (A slow death), one of her poems written in 2000, has for a long time been erroneously attributed to Pablo Neruda.

== Bibliography ==
- Strip-Tease (1985)
- Meia noite e um quarto (1987)
- Persona non grata (1991)
- Con Cara Lavada (1995)
- Poesia Reunida (1998)
- Geração Bivolt (1995)
- Topless (1997)
- Santiago do Cile (1996)
- Trem-Bala (1999)
- Non Stop (2000)
- Cartas Extraviadas e Outros Poemas (2000)
- A Morte Devagar (2000)
- Couch (2002)
- Divã (2002) - this piece began a piece acted from Lilia Cabral (Mercedes).
- Montanha-Russa (2003)
- Rollercoaster (2003)
- Esquisita como Eu (2004)
- Selma e Sinatra (2005)
- Tudo que Eu Queria te Dizer (2007)
- Doidas e Santas (2008)
- Fora de Mim (2010)
- Feliz por Nada (2011)
