= Geovani Martins =

- Born: July 18, 1991 (age 34)
- Occupation: writer

Geovani Martins (born July 18, 1991 in Rio de Janeiro) is a Brazilian writer.

== Biography ==
Geovani Martins was born July 18, 1991 in Bangu, in the West Zone of Rio de Janeiro. He only studied up to the eighth grade, then worked as a sign man and cafeteria attendant, among other low paying jobs. Martins lived in the favelas of Rocinha and Barreira do Vasco before moving to Vidigal. He participated in the workshops of the Festa Literária das Periferias (Flup) in 2013 and 2015. In 2015, Martins presented at FLIP, the magazine Setor (contracted with Companhia das Letras) to launch his first book, O Sol na Cabeça. Even before publication, the collection of short stories was sold to publishers in nine countries, including Farrar, Straus & Giroux (USA), Faber & Faber (United Kingdom), Suhrkamp (Germany) and Mondadori (Italy), and has been published in 10 different languages. The film adaptation rights were also negotiated, with filmmaker Karim Aïnouz heading the project.

== Works ==
Much of his writing is focused on the lives of young men living in the favelas of Rio de Janeiro, and to a certain extent his own life experiences. His works include a book of short stories titled O Sol na Cabeça (2018) and the novel Via Ápia (2022).
