= Osman Lins =

Brazilian novelist (1924–1978)

- Born: 5 July 1924; Vitória de Santo Antão, Pernambuco, Brazil
- Died: 8 July 1978 (aged 54); São Paulo, Brazil
- Education: Federal University of Pernambuco
- Occupations: Novelist, short story writer

Osman Lins (July 5, 1924 – July 8, 1978) was a Brazilian novelist and short-story writer. He is considered to be one of the leading innovators of Brazilian literature in the mid 20th century.

Lins was born in Vitória de Santo Antão, Pernambuco. He graduated from the University of Recife in 1946 with a degree in Economics and Finance, and held a position as bank clerk from 1943 until 1970. From 1970 to 1976 he taught literature.

His first novel, O Visitante ("The Visitor"), was published in 1955. His later publications would bring him international recognition and establish his reputation—Nove, Novena (1966; "Nine, Ninth"), a collection of short stories; Avalovara (1973), a novel; and A Rainha dos Cárceres da Grécia (1976; "The Queen of the Grecian Jails"), a novel/essay. Lins was the recipient of three major Brazilian literary awards, which included the Coelho Neto Prize of the Brazilian Academy of Letters. He died in São Paulo at the age of 54 from widespread cancer, the result of a belatedly diagnosed melanoma.
