= Holdemar Menezes =

Brazilian writer

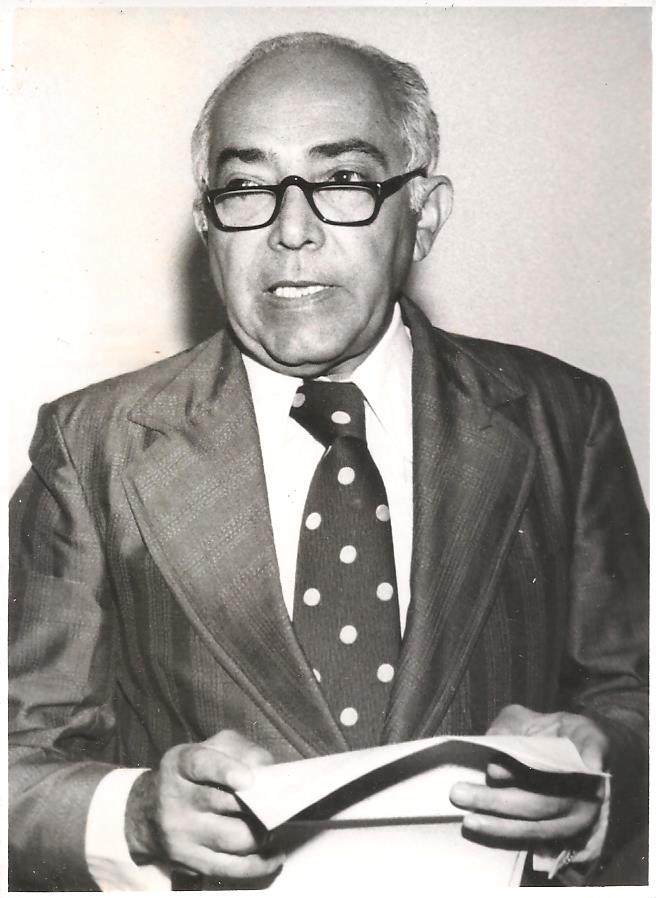
Holdemar Menezes

Holdemar Menezes (December 13, 1921 – August 19, 1996) was a Brazilian writer.

He was born in Aracati, in the state of Ceará, as the third child of Ezequiel Silva de Menezes and Otília Oliveira de Menezes. He moved to Rio de Janeiro where in 1949 he earned his degree from the Medical School of Rio de Janeiro (Escola de Medicina e Cirurgia do Rio de Janeiro) – his practice was gynaecology and obstetrics. After finishing his residency in Rio, he moved to the state of Santa Catarina: first to São Francisco do Sul, and soon after to Florianópolis.

Despite his work as a medical doctor, Holdemar dedicated a great part of his life to writing. Even though he was never a full-time writer he managed to produce quality work and had great impact in the Brazilian literature. In 1972, his work was recognised in Brazil with the Jabuti prize (one of the most respected literature prizes in Brazil) for his book A Coleira de Peggy. For all his body of work, Holdemar is considered an immortal by the Academy of Literature of Santa Catarina (Academia Catarinense de Letras).

== Bibliography ==
- Os Eleitos Para o Sacrifício
- Kafka – O Outro
- O Barco Naufragado
- A Sonda Uretral
- A Maçã Triangular
- Os Residentes
- A Vida Vivida
- A Coleira de Peggy
