= José Paulo Lanyi =

Brazilian journalist, writer, producer, and filmmaker (born 1970)

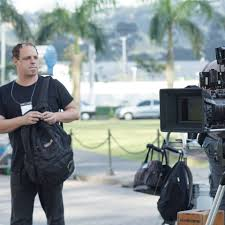
- José Paulo Lanyi

Personal details
- Born: José Paulo Lanyi; April 10, 1970 (age 55) Brasília, Federal District (Brazil)
- Profession: Journalist, writer, playwright

José Paulo Lanyi (born April 10, 1970) is a Brazilian journalist, writer, producer, and filmmaker.

He is the author of the novel "Calixto – Azar de quem votou em mim" ("Calixto- Bad luck for whom voted for me", in free translation/Amazon) and of the 'scenic novel' "Deus me disse que não existe" ("God told me that he doesn't exist", in free translation/Chiado Books, Portugal)- 'scenic novel' is considered by Lanyi as a new literary genre that combines both novel and play (theatre).

Published by the Official Press of the State of São Paulo, his play "Quando dorme o vilarejo" ("When the village sleeps", in free translation), recognized in 2002 by the Brazilian Vladimir Herzog Award for Amnesty and Human Rights coverage, tells the story of a hamlet whose residents become happy when learn that they will be hanged by the community in which they live. Inspired by the surreal movies by Luis Buñuel, the play was staged with the United Nations support at the São Bento Theatre in São Paulo, on December 10, 2008.

Lanyi graduated in journalism from Faculdade Cásper Líbero in 1993. He has worked as a reporter for some of the major São Paulo television and radio networks, among them Globo TV, Rede Bandeirantes, Manchete TV, CBN Radio, Globo Radio, Radiobrás and CNT TV. He also collaborated with the literary magazine "Cult" and was a foreign correspondent in London (UK) in 1995.

He was a columnist for Observatório da Imprensa and Comunique-se media criticism websites and worked in São Paulo as a BBC freelance reporter and as a director of making of and as an executive producer for the 2017 film "Real- O Plano por trás da história" ("Real, The Plan Behind History").

In 2020 he published on Amazon his history play "Maquiavel, O Homem por Trás do Mal" ("Machiavelli, The Man Behind Evil").

He is also the author and producer of "Psiu" ("Psst!"), a Portuguese-language comedy about annoying neighbors, street noise, and invasive construction work. This play denounces noise pollution in a metropolis.

Lanyi is a member of the São Paulo Association of Art Critics (Associação Paulista de Críticos de Arte) – APCA.

== Awards ==
Esso Journalism Award (2005) – given to allTV in recognition of their journalistic work. Lanyi was part of the news team, as host, producer, editor and reporter.

Vladimir Herzog Award (2002) – for his play "Quando dorme o vilarejo".

IBest Award (2005/2006) given to Comunique-se web portal (where Lanyi worked as a columnist), for their journalistic activities.

== List of works ==
- 2020 -"Maquiavel, O Homem Por Trás do Mal" ("Machiavelli, The Man Behind Evil"; play).
- 2012–2013/2018 – Crítica de Jornalismo (Criticism of journalism; collection of media criticism, 5 volumes).
- 2012 – O Artista Joseval e Quando Dorme o Vilarejo (The artist Joseval and When the village sleeps; play).
- 2012 – Vida a três (Three-person relationship in free translation; screenplay).
- 2012 – Balbúrdia Literária (Literary Shambles; chronic, poetry, short stories).
- 2002 – Quando Dorme o Vilarejo (When the village sleeps; play).
- 2002/2018 – Deus Me Disse que Não Existe (God told me that He doesn't exist; scenic novel).
- 2000 – Calixto – Azar de quem votou em mim (Calixto- Bad luck for whom voted for me; novel).

== Title ==
- Member of the São Paulo Association of Art Critics (APCA).
