= José de Côrtes Duarte =

Brazilian author

José de Côrtes Duarte was a Brazilian writer born in Garanhuns, Pernambuco in the year 1895. His books are mainly narratives about regional aspects of Minas Gerais, where he lived as farmer and vaquero. His books became a source of information about historic aspects of the region. He was elected a lifetime member of the Academia Mineira de Letras (Academy of Letters of Minas Gerais).

== Books ==
- Vultos sem História - 1972
- A Tragédia de Sergipe e Outras Narrativas - Editorial Lemi, 1979
- O Fogo e o Boi - 1976
- Crônicas Quadradas - 1981
