= Gilberto Mendonça Teles =

Brazilian writer (1931–2024)

- Born: 30 June 1931 Bela Vista de Goiás, Goiás, Brazil
- Died: 4 December 2024 (aged 93) Rio de Janeiro, Brazil
- Language: Portuguese
- Education: Pontifical Catholic University of Rio Grande do Sul
- Genre: Poetry

Gilberto Mendonça Teles (30 June 1931 – 4 December 2024) was a Brazilian writer. He was born in Bela Vista de Goiás, state of Goiás. Teles died in Rio de Janeiro on 4 December 2024, at the age of 93.

== Bibliography ==
- Alvorada, poetry, 1955
- Estrela-d'Alva, poetry, 1956
- Planície, poetry, 1958
- Fábula de Fogo, poetry, 1961
- Pássaro de Pedra, poetry, 1962
- Sintaxe Invisível, 1967
- A Raiz da Fala, poetry, 1972
- Arte de Armar, poetry, 1977
- Poemas Reunidos, poetry, 1978
- Saciologia goiana, poetry, 1982
- Plural de Nuvens, poetry, 1984
- Hora Aberta, poetry, 1986
- Falavra, poetry, 1989
- & Cone de Sombras, poetry, 1993
- Nominais, poetry, 1993
- Os Melhores Poemas, poetry, 1993
- & Cone de Sombras, poetry, 1995
- Álibis, poetry, 2000
