= José Lino Grünewald =

Brazilian intellectual

José Lino Grünewald

José Lino Grünewald (1931–2000) was a Brazilian intellectual who was born and died in Rio de Janeiro, Brazil. A multi-disciplinary intellectual, his writings included poetry, translation (especially Ezra Pound's The Cantos), and essays (major works compiled in O grau zero do escreviver). He also acted in the movie O gigante da America.
