= The Celebration (novel) =

Novel by Ivan Ângelo

The Celebration (Portuguese: A festa) is a Prêmio Jabuti-winning novel by Brazilian author Ivan Ângelo. Ângelo began writing the book in 1964 but did not publish it until 1976, in part because of the censorship imposed by the Brazilian military regime after the 1964 coup.

It was translated into English by Thomas Colchie in 1982.
