= Leo Cunha =

Brazilian author

Leo Cunha (born June 5, 1966) is a Brazilian author. In 1994, he won the Jabuti Award for Best New Author.

== Career ==
Cunha was born in Bocaiúva, Minas Gerais. He has a degree in journalism and advertising and a postgraduate degree in children's literature from PUC-Minas. Cunha has a master's degree in information science and a doctorate in cinema from UFMG, with a thesis on comic heroes in the films of French filmmaker Francis Veber. Leo Cunha has published dozens of children's and youth books, as well as chronicles and translations.

He served as a university professor and was a columnist for the film web-magazine Filmes Polvo, from 2008 to 2013. Cunha is also a columnist for the Canguru News website, and is a founding member of the Association of Writers and Illustrators of Children's and Youth Literature (AEI-LIJ), in which he has held the position of general secretary.
