= Socorro Acioli =

Brazilian writer

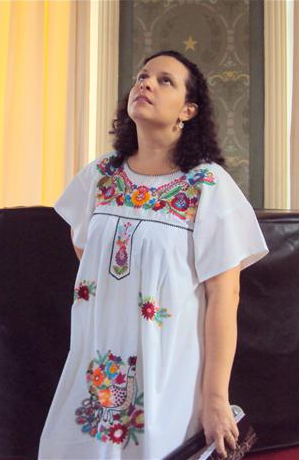
- Born: February 24, 1975 (age 51); Fortaleza, Ceará
- Occupations: Writer and Journalist
- Writing career
- Genre: Children's literature SocorroAcioli]

Socorro Acioli (born 1975 in Fortaleza, Ceará) is a Brazilian writer and journalist.

== Biography ==
She has a master's degree in Brazilian literature and is currently following a PhD. in Literary Studies at the Universidade Federal Fluminense, Rio de Janeiro.

She started her career in 2001 and since then has published books of various genres, such as biographies Frei Tito (2001) and Rachel de Queiroz (2003), children's short stories and youth novels.

In 2006, she was selected to take part in a workshop called 'How to tell a tale', conducted by the Nobel Prize winner Gabriel García Márquez at the San Antonio de Los Baños International Film and Television School, Cuba. The author was selected by García Márquez himself based on the synopsis of the novel A cabeça do santo/The Head of the Saint, which was published in the UK in 2014 and in the US in 2016. In 2007, she was a visiting researcher at the International Youth Library in Munich, Germany. She has also given lectures in several countries such as Portugal, Bolivia and Cape Verde. Mrs. Acioli is also a translator, essayist and literary theory teacher.

Vende-se uma família/A Family for Sale (Biruta Publishing Company, 2007), her first youth novel, tells the story of the friendship between Álvaro, the son of the owner of the largest farm in Aquiraz, Ceará and Benício, a slave from the farm. They become friends in their early childhood and are separated after Maria Luanda, Benicio's mother, is sold. According to Fernanda Coutinho, teacher and literary critic, it is a narration that "flows quickly, following the steps of the brothers until adulthood, maintaining continuously aroused the curiosity of the reader about what is to come and, at the same time, makes them look through a portrait of the Brazilian family through the conjunction of customs of the three races that gave origin to it. The leaves of the album transcribe African and indigenous rituals such as the arts of healing, the belief in the magic power of the herbs, the singing and dancing, as expressions of joy and consolation, funeral ceremonies, rituals of listening and storytelling as sources of spiritual nourishment".

Literary critic Marisa Lajolo praised the novel A bailarina fantasma (Biruta Publishing Company, 2010), as a masterpiece.

Inventário de Segredos/Inventory of Secrets (Biruta Publishing Company, 2010), a string literature youth novel, tells the story of a town through the revealing of the main secrets of its inhabitants. According to the writer Marina Colasanti, "the connection with string literature is great, the narrative chain works very well, and the erotic/loving theme is handled with the humor that the genre requires."

The Head of the Saint (Hot Key Books, 2014) is her first English-language novel for young people, translated by Daniel Hahn. In 2016, the American version of Head of the Saint was voted one of the best books for teens by the New York Public Library and was among the finalists for the Los Angeles Times Book Prizes in the Children's Literature category.

== Bibliography ==
Year	Portuguese Title	English Title
1984	O pipoqueiro João	João's Popcorn Stand
2001	Frei Tito	Frei Tito
2003	Rachel de Queiroz	Rachel de Queiroz
2004	Bia que tanto lia	The Readmaniac Bia
2005	É pra ler ou pra comer?	May I Read or Swallow It?
2005	A casa dos Benjamins	The House of Weeping Figs
2006	O peixinho de Pedra	Little Stone Fish
2006	O anjo do lago	The Angel of the Lake
2007	Vende-se uma família	Family for Sale
2008	O mistério da professora Julieta	The Mystery of Teacher Julieta
2008	Tempo de Caju	Cashew Season
2009	A rendeira Borralheira	Borralheira, the Seamstress
2010	A Bailarina Fantasma	The Phantom Ballerina
2010	Inventário de Segredos	Inventory of Secrets
2014	A Cabeça do Santo	The Head of the Saint (published in English ;translation by Daniel Hahn)
2023	Oração para desaparecer	Prayer to disappear

== Awards ==
- Melhor Obra Inédita de Literatura Infantil - Secretaria de Cultura do Estado do Ceará 2005
- Selo Altamente Recomendável - FNLIJ 2006, 2007 e 2008
