= Sérgio Sant'Anna =

Brazilian writer (1941–2020)

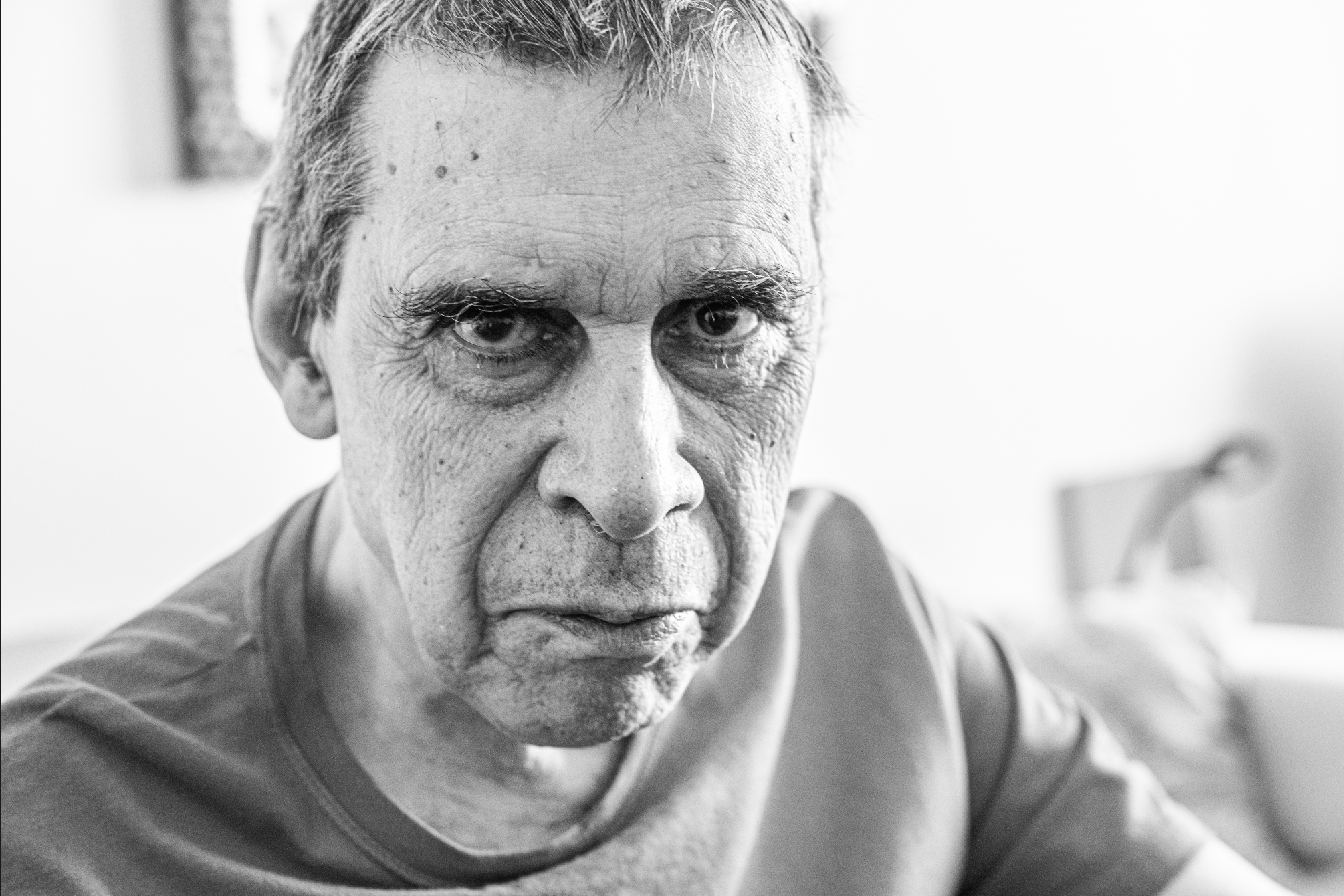
- Born: October 30, 1941; Rio de Janeiro, Brazil
- Died: May 10, 2020 (aged 78); Rio de Janeiro, Brazil
- Occupation: Writer

Sérgio Sant'Anna (30 October 1941 – 10 May 2020) was a Brazilian writer, born in Rio de Janeiro.

== Life ==
He wrote poems, plays, short stories, novellas and novels. His works have been translated to German and Italian. His works are heavily metafictional and have influenced a newer generation of Brazilian writers.

== Death ==
Sérgio Sant'Anna died on 10 May 2020, in Rio de Janeiro, after being hospitalized with COVID-19 symptoms during the COVID-19 pandemic in Brazil.

== Bibliography ==
- O Sobrevivente, 1969
- Notas de Manfredo Rangel, Repórter (A respeito de Kramer), 1973
- Confissões de Ralfo, novel, 1975
- Simulacros, novel, 1977
- Um Romance de Geração, play, 1981
- O Concerto de João Gilberto no Rio de Janeiro, short stories, 1982
- Junk-Box, poetry, 1984
- A Tragédia Brasileira: Romance-Teatro, novel/play, 1987
- Senhorita Simpson, short stories, 1989
- Uma Breve História do Espírito, short stories, 1991
- O Monstro, short stories, 1994
- Um crime delicado, novel, 1997
- O vôo da madrugada, short stories, 2003 (translated as "The Extra Flight")
- O livro de Praga, novel, 2011
- Páginas sem glória, short stories, 2012
- O homem-mulher, short stories, 2014
- O conto zero, short stories, 2016
- Anjo noturno, short stories, 2017
