= Adalcinda Camarão =

Brazilian writer, educator and composer

Adalcinda Camarão

Adalcinda Magno Camarão Luxardo (July 18, 1914 – January 17, 2005) was a Brazilian writer, educator and composer.

== Biography ==
Adalcinda Magno Camarão Luxardo was born in Muaná, Marajó, July 18, 1914. She was the daughter of João Evangelista de Carvalho Camarão and Camila de Brito Magno Camarão. She was educated at Colégio Pedro II and also at the Instituto de Educação.

She contributed to various literary magazines as well as contributing to newspapers. In 1949, she was given a seat in the Academia Paraense de Letras, one of the first women to be named to a literary academy in Brazil. In 1956, with the aid of a scholarship from the Brazil government, she pursued studies in linguistics at American University in the United States. From 1961 to 1988, she worked at the Brazilian embassy in Washington. She also taught Brazilian and Portuguese literature and the Portuguese language at various American universities and educational institutions. In 1960, Camarão established the Portuguese department at Georgetown University, teaching there until 1965.

Camarão published several collections of poetry including Baladas de Monte Alegre, Entre Espelho e Estrelas, Folhas and Vidências.

== Awards and honours ==
She was awarded the José Veríssimo cultural medal, the Olavo Bilac medal and the Paulino de Brito medal.

== Personal life ==
She married filmmaker Líbero Luxardo; the couple had one son.

In 2000, after living 44 years in the United States, Camarão returned to Brazil, settling in Belém. She died there at the age of 90.
