= Regina Rheda =

Brazilian-born writer (born 1957)

Regina Rheda (born 1957) is a Brazilian-born writer who lives in the United States. She is known for her prose fiction concerning urban life, transnational migration, class conflicts, and animal rights. She received a national book award, Prêmio Jabuti, in 1995.

== Early life ==
Rheda was born in 1957 in Santa Cruz do Rio Pardo, the eldest of four siblings. Her family moved to the city of São Paulo while she was in grammar school. She studied at the University of São Paulo.

== Career ==
Before becoming a writer, she had worked with film, video and television. Her works won awards. In the 80s, she was singer-songwriter in a rock band. In the 90s, she was one of the directors of the children's television program Castelo Rá-Tim-Bum.

She earned a Jabuti prize for short fiction in 1995 with her debut collection of short stories Arca sem Noé - Histórias do Edifício Copan, which was translated as Stories From the Copan Building. The story "O mau vizinho" received the Lusophone fiction award from the Maison de l'Amérique latine. The collection was included in the volume First World Third Class and Other Tales of the Global Mix (University of Texas Press). The most substantial segment in this volume is the title piece, a novel of discovery and Brazilian emigration.

Rheda's book Humana Festa, A Novel has veganism and the abolition of all animal exploitation as guiding themes.

Academic Earl E. Fitz calls her short fictions "funny and poignant, but thought provoking as well." Scholar Alexandra Isfahani-Hammond considers her novel Humana Festa a pioneering work.

== Translation of her works into English and other languages ==
- First World Third Class and Other Tales of the Global Mix. Contents include the collection Stories from the Copan Building, the novel First World Third Class, and the short stories "The Enchanted Princess" and "The Sanctuary," as well as a story originally written in English, "The Front." Austin: University of Texas Press, 2005. Translation: Charles A. Perrone, Adria Frizzi, REYoung and David Coles. Foreword by Prof. Christopher Dunn. ISBN 0-292-70699-5.
- "Miss Carminda and the Prince." (Short story). Journal Meridians. Smith College/Indiana University Press, Fall 2004. Translation: Lydia Billon.

This story was also published in Croatian (translator: Jelena Bulic) at Sic Literary Journal (University of Zadar, Croatia).

- "The Sanctuary." (Short story). Republished in the anthology Luso-American Literature: Writings by Portuguese-Speaking Authors in North America. Rutgers University Press, Summer 2011. Translation: Charles A. Perrone. ISBN 978-0-8135-5058-9
- Humana Festa, a Novel. Columbus: The Educational Publisher, 2012. Translation: Charles A. Perrone. Ebook and print. ISBN 978-1-934849-96-5.

== Original works in English ==
- "Gold for the Good." (Short story). Literature and arts journal Unlikely Stories Six. October 2025.
- "The Metaphor Peddler." (Short story). Literature and arts journal Unlikely Stories Mark V. November 2024.
- "The Front." (Short story). In First World Third Class and Other Tales of the Global Mix. Austin: University of Texas Press, 2005.

== Original works in Portuguese ==
=== Novels and story collections ===
- Arca sem Noé - Histórias do Edifício Copan. (Short story collection). Rio: Record, 2010. ISBN 978-85-01-08766-9. The first edition appeared in 1994.
- Pau-de-arara classe turística. (Novel). First ed.: Rio de Janeiro: Record, 1996. New edition in ebook format in 2013. ISBN 978-0-615-75095-8.
- Amor sem-vergonha. (Short story collection). Rio de Janeiro: Record, 1997. ISBN 85-01-04600-0.
- Livro que vende. (Novel). São Paulo: Altana, 2003. ISBN 85-87770-20-9.
- Humana festa. (Novel). São Paulo: Record, 2008. ISBN 978-85-01-08116-2.

=== Children's book ===
- A astrobolha de sabão. Regina Rheda (author). Ana Mara Abreu (illustrator). São Paulo: Editora Rios, 1983.

=== Participation in anthologies of various authors ===
- "O santuário." (Short story). In Pátria estranha. São Paulo: Nova Alexandria, 2002. ISBN 85-7492-029-0
- "Dona Carminda e o príncipe." (Short story). In Histórias dos tempos de escola. São Paulo: Nova Alexandria, 2002. ISBN 85-7492-051-7
- "A frente." (Short story.The Portuguese version of "The Front"). In Mais trinta mulheres que estão fazendo a nova literatura brasileira. Rio: Record, 2005. ISBN 85-01-07194-3
- "The Sanctuary." (Short story). In Luso-American Literature: Writings by Portuguese-Speaking Authors in North America. Rutgers University Press, Summer 2011. Translation: Charles A. Perrone. ISBN 978-0-8135-5058-9
- "O mau vizinho." (Both in Portuguese and in English translation by Adria Frizzi and REYoung). In Contrapuntos II. E-book. Digitus Indie Publishers, 2014.
- "Falta d'água." In Crônicas Brasileiras: a Reader. University Press of Florida, 2014.

== Translations into Portuguese ==
- Empty Cages - Facing the Challenge of Animal Rights, by Tom Regan (Jaulas vazias: encarando o desafio dos direitos animais. Porto Alegre: Lugano, 2006).
- Materials from professor Gary L. Francione's official website/blog Animal Rights: The Abolitionist Approach (Direitos animais: a abordagem abolicionista).
- Introduction to Animal Rights: Your Child or the Dog?, by Gary L. Francione (Introdução aos direitos animais: seu filho ou o cachorro? Campinas: Editora da Unicamp, 2013. ISBN 978-85-268-0997-0).
