= Ivan Ângelo =

Brazilian writer

Ivan Ângelo (born February 4, 1936, in Barbacena, Minas Gerais province) is a Brazilian writer who has worked as a novelist, short-story writer, and journalist.

He wrote his first stories in 1954. One of his early works, "Culpado sem Crime" (Guilty without Crime), won an award in a contest sponsored by the city of Belo Horizonte. In 1965, he moved to São Paulo where he worked for the Jornal da Tarde.

He won the Prêmio Jabuti in 1976 with his novel, A festa (The Celebration) and again in 1995 for Amor?. He has also received awards from APCA for A face horrivel (The Horrible Face) and Pode me beijar se quiser (You can Kiss me if you Want).

He has written a regular column for the weekly São Paulo newsmagazine Veja since 1999. He has also lectured at Yale University.

== Books ==
- Homem sofrendo no quarto, 1959
- Duas faces (Two Faces), 1961
- A festa (The Celebration), 1975
- A casa de vidro (The Tower of Glass, English translation by Ellen Watson), 1979
- A face horrível, 1986
- O ladrão de sonhos e outras histórias (The Thief of Dreams and other stories), 1994
- Amor? (Love?), 1995
- Pode me beijar se quiser (You can kiss me if you want), 1997
- O vestido luminoso da princesa, 1997
- História em ão e inha, 1998
