= Cyro dos Anjos =

Brazilian journalist, and writer

Cyro Versiani dos Anjos
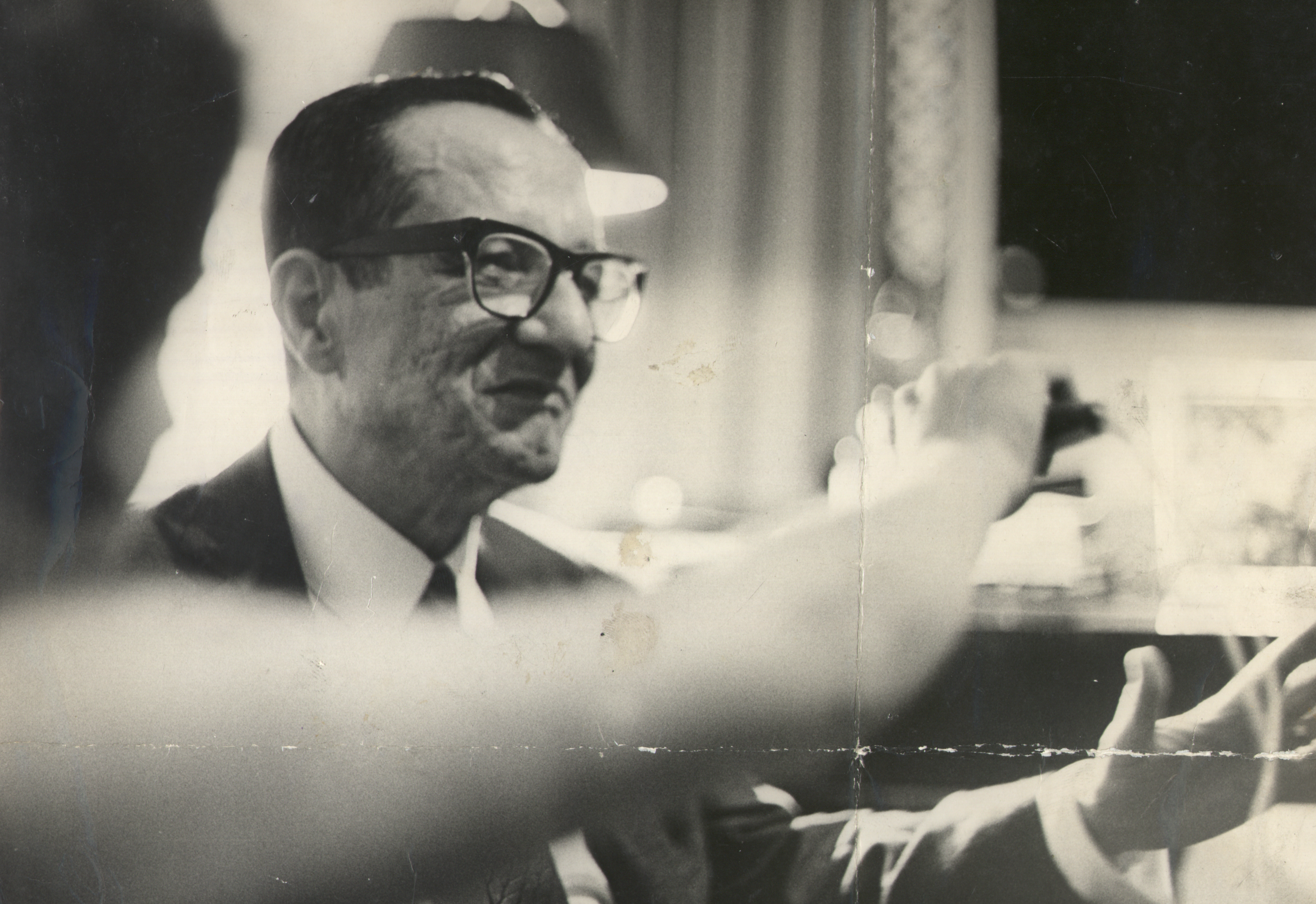
- Born: October 5, 1906
- Died: August 4, 1994 (aged 87)
- Occupations: Writer and journalist
- Writing career
- Language: Portuguese

Cyro Versiani dos Anjos (October 5, 1906 – August 4, 1994) was a Brazilian writer, journalist, and professor.

He was born in Montes Claros, in the state of Minas Gerais. In 1923, he went to Belo Horizonte, where he studied law at Federal University of Minas Gerais and graduated in 1932. He died in Rio de Janeiro, state of Rio de Janeiro, aged 87.

== Bibliography ==
- O Amauense Belmiro, novel 1937, translated and published in Mexico and Italy
- Montanha, 1950
- Abdias, novel, 1945
- A Criação Literária, essay, 1959
- Montanha, novel, 1956
- Poemas Coronarianos, poetry, 1964
- Explorações no Tempo,1952
- A Menina do Sobrado, 1979
