= Paulo Scott =

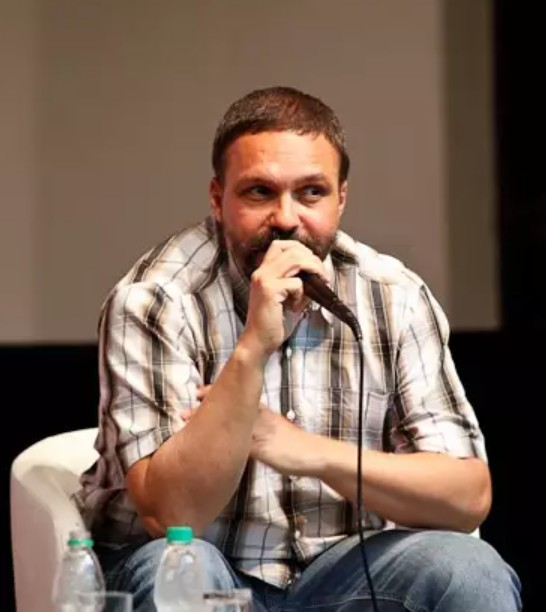
- Born: Paulo Scott; December 8, 1966 (age 58); Porto Alegre, Brazil
- Occupation(s): Author, playwright, screenwriter, translator

Paulo Scott (born 8 December 1966) is a Brazilian author, poet, playwright, screenwriter and translator.

Born in Porto Alegre, he studied law at Pontifical Catholic University of Rio Grande do Sul (PUCRS-RG); he worked as a lawyer and Law professor for a decade, before becoming a writer. He has received numerous awards including the Prêmio Fundação Biblioteca Nacional, and been shortlisted for renowned prizes like the Prêmio Jabuti and the Prêmio São Paulo de Literatura. His short story collection Ainda Orangotangos (Still Orangutans) was adapted into a movie and won the Milano Film Festival in 2008.

In 2014, his novel Nowhere People was published in English (trans. Daniel Hahn) by And Other Stories. It was featured on World Literature Today’s list of ‘Notable Translations in 2014’. His following book, Phenotypes, was longlisted to the 2022 International Booker Prize.

He currently lives in Rio de Janeiro.

== Works ==
=== Novels ===
- 2005: Voláteis; Ed. Objetiva
- 2011: Habitante Irreal; Companhia das Letras
  - English translation: Nowhere People; trans. Daniel Hahn; And Other Stories, 2014.
- 2013: Ithaca Road; Companhia das Letras
- 2015: O Ano em que vivi de literatura; Editora Foz.
- 2019: Marrom e Amarelo; Companhia das Letras
  - English translation: Phenotypes; trans. Daniel Hahn; And Other Stories, 2022.
- 2021 Meu Mundo versus Marta (graphic novel; illustrated by Rafael Sica), Companhia das Letras

=== Poetry ===
- 2001: Histórias curtas para domesticar as paixões dos anjos e atenuar os sofrimentos dos monstros, (under the pseudonym Elrodris), Editora Sulina
- 2006: Senhor escuridão, Editora Bertrand Brasil - Grupo Editorial Record
- 2006: A timidez do monstro, Editora Objetiva, 2006;
- 2011 O Monstro e o Minotauro, Editora Dulcinéia Catadora, 2011 (self-published, illustrated by Laerte Coutinho)
- 2014 Mesmo sem dinheiro comprei um esqueite novo, Editora Companhia das Letras
- 2019 Garopaba Monstro Tubarão, Editora Selo Demônio Negro
- 2020 Se o mundo é redondo e outros poemas, Editora Gato Bravo

=== Stage play ===
- 2006- Crucial dois um

=== Short stories ===
- 2003: Ainda Orangotangos; Livros do Mal; revised edition: 2006, Ed. Bertrand Brasil.
