= Afonso Arinos =

Brazilian writer, journalist and jurist

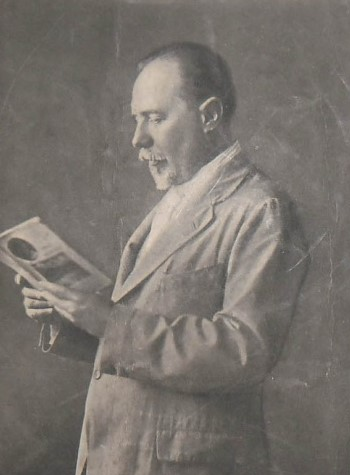
- Born: Afonso Arinos de Melo Franco; May 1, 1868; Paracatu, Minas Gerais, Brazil
- Died: February 19, 1916 (aged 47); Barcelona, Spain
- Writing career
- Pen name: Olívio Barros

Afonso Arinos de Melo Franco (May 1, 1868 – February 19, 1916) was a Brazilian journalist, writer and jurist.

In the 19th century, he was recognized as one of the most influential intellectuals of his time. His work is part of Brazil's most prestigious literature and contains a strong message of social criticism.

== Works ==
- Os jagunços (1897)
- Pelo sertão (1898)
