= Lya Luft =

Brazilian writer and translator (1938–2021)

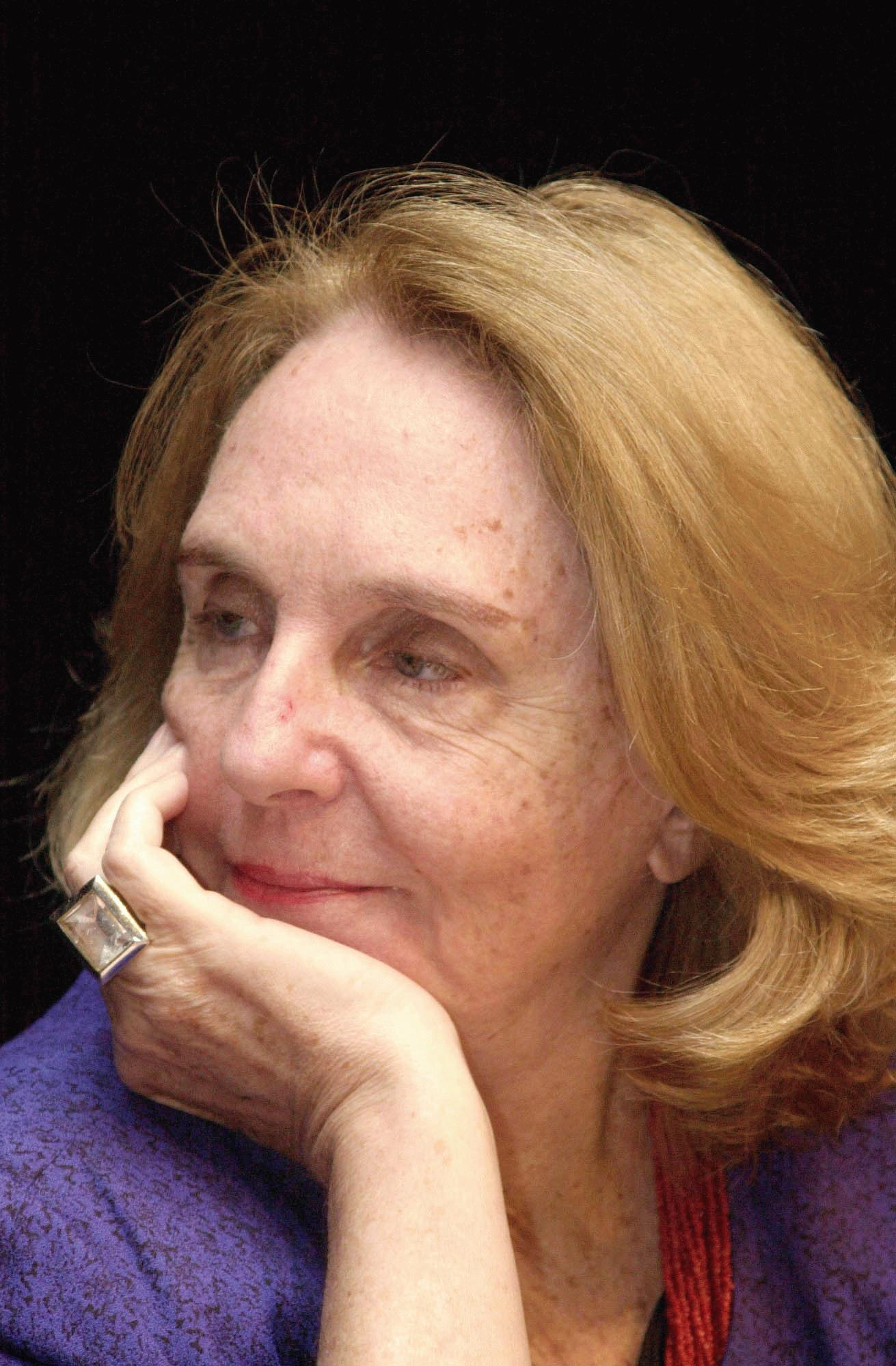
- Luft in 2003
- Born: Lya Fett; 15 September 1938; Santa Cruz do Sul, Rio Grande do Sul, Brazil
- Died: 30 December 2021 (aged 83); Porto Alegre, Rio Grande do Sul, Brazil
- Education: PUCRS
- Occupations: Writer, prolific translator

Lya Fett Luft (15 September 1938 – 30 December 2021) was a Brazilian writer and a prolific translator, working mostly in the English-Portuguese and the German-Portuguese language combinations.

== Life and career ==
Lya Fett was born on 15 September 1938 in Santa Cruz do Sul (Rio Grande do Sul) which was largely settled by German-speaking immigrants, beginning in the first half of the 19th century. A notable percentage of the population there speak both German and Portuguese, including Fett's family. She later moved to Porto Alegre, where she lived until her death. Though raised Lutheran, at the age of 19 Luft converted to Catholicism. She was a college professor of linguistics and literature, and wrote an opinion column for Veja magazine. Luft's literary work has been translated into other European languages, including German, English and Italian.

== Death ==
Lya Luft suffered a heart attack in 2019. She died at her home in Porto Alegre two years later at age 83, on 30 December 2021, from melanoma.

== Bibliography ==
Works she produced in Portuguese:

- Canções de Limiar, 1964
- Flauta Doce, 1972
- Matéria do Cotidiano, 1978
- As Parceiras, 1980
- A Asa Esquerda do Anjo, 1981
- Reunião de Família, 1982
- O Quarto Fechado, 1984
- Mulher no Palco, 1984
- Exílio, 1987
- O Lado Fatal, 1989
- O Rio do Meio, 1996
- Secreta Mirada, 1997
- O Ponto Cego, 1999
- Histórias do Tempo, 2000
- Mar de dentro, 2000
- Perdas e Ganhos, 2003
- Histórias de Bruxa Boa, 2004
- Pensar é Transgredir, 2004
- Para não Dizer Adeus, 2005
- O tigre na sombra, 2014
- Coisas humanas, 2020
