= Maria Rita Kehl =

Brazilian psychoanalyst and writer

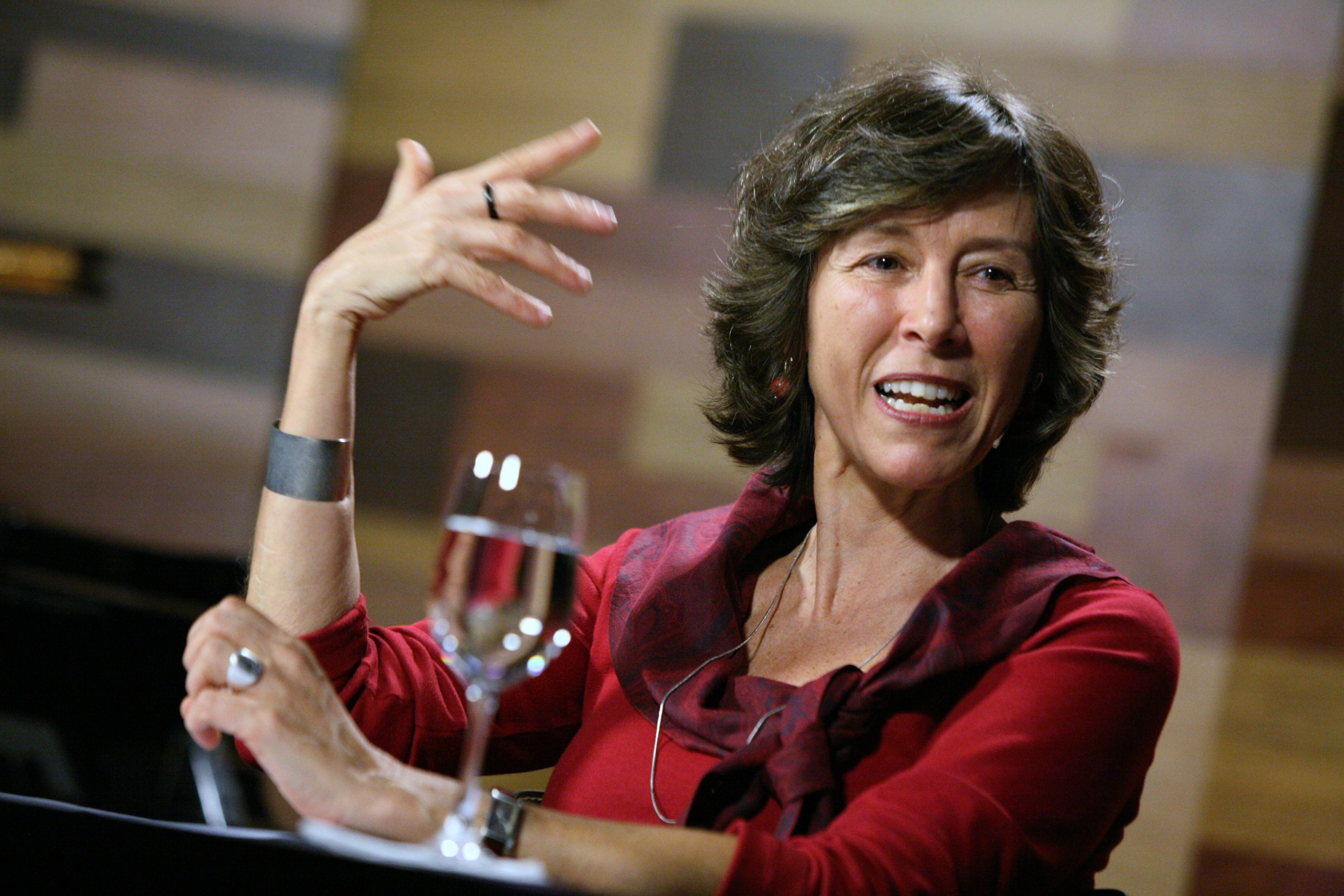
- Kehl, in 2009, at Café Filosófico CPFL
- Born: December 10, 1951 (age 74); Campinas, São Paulo Brazil
- Education: University of São Paulo
- Occupations: psychoanalyst, writer, poet, essayist, literary critic

Maria Rita Kehl, ORB (born December 10, 1951) is a Brazilian psychoanalyst, journalist, poet, essayist, cronista and literary critic. In 2010, she won the Jabuti Award in the Education, Psychology and Psychoanalysis category and the Human Rights Award from the Brazilian government in the Media and Human Rights category.

== Life and career ==
Kehl was born in Campinas, São Paulo. She graduated in psychology from the University of São Paulo, and started writing for Jornal do Bairro while still in college. She worked for the newspaper managed by writer Raduan Nassar for two years. She was editor for the alternative newspaper Movimento, critical of the Brazilian military regime.

Kehl also participated in the foundation of newspaper Em Tempo and wrote as a freelancer for Veja, Isto É, Folha de S. Paulo and O Estado de S. Paulo.

In 1979, Kehl began her master's degree in social psychology and wrote the dissertation "O Papel da Rede Globo e das Novelas da Globo em Domesticar o Brasil Durante a Ditadura Militar". In 1981, Kehl started attending patients. In 1997, she received her doctorate in psychoanalysis at PUC-SP. The research resulted in the book Deslocamentos do Feminino - A Mulher Freudiana na Passagem para a Modernidade in 1998. Kehl has written several books and articles in the areas of literature, culture, and psychoanalysis.

In 2012, she was invited to participate in the National Truth Commission, which was installed on May 16 to investigate human rights violations which had occurred in Brazil between September 18, 1946, and October 5, 1988.

== Estadão ==
I have been writing a fortnightly column in Caderno 2 of the daily O Estado de S. Paulo since February 2010, in which I published the article "Dois Pesos..." on October 2 of the same year. In it, he talked about the countless e-mail chains sent on the Internet that disqualified the votes of the "poor" of the so-called social classes D and E under an argument that he considered "familiar to the reader": "(...) the votes of the poor in favor of continuing the social policies implemented during eight years of Lula's government are not worth as much as ours", also stating that, according to this argument, the votes of these citizens "are not a conscious expression of political will" and "would have been bought at the price of what part of the opposition calls a handout".

As well as refuting the arguments of some of the emails circulating on the internet with ironies such as "where did the real humble people end up who the cordial bosses liked so much, capable of working well beyond the statutory eight hours for a pittance?" and remarks such as "if true, it's appalling to imagine what they lived on before that", Maria Rita also made a comment in favor of the Bolsa Família Program when she wrote: "It's worth trying life with Bolsa Família, which, despite being modest, has reduced the population in a state of extreme poverty from 12% to 4.8%. Do São Paulo readers have any idea how poor they have to be to get out of this bracket for a difference of R$200?".

She ends the article by writing that "when, for the first time, those without citizenship have won the minimum rights that they want to preserve through democracy, some of the citizens who consider themselves class A come out to disqualify the seriousness of their votes".

== Published works ==
- Processos Primários (Editora Estação Liberdade, 1996)
- A Mínima Diferença (Imago Editora, 1996)
- Deslocamentos do Feminino - A Mulher Freudiana na Passagem para a Modernidade (Imago Editora, 1998)
- Função Fraterna (Relume Dumará, 2000)
- Sobre Ética e Psicanálise (Companhia das Letras, 2000)
- Ressentimento (Casa do psicólogo, 2004)
- Videologias, co-written by Eugênio Bucci (Boitempo Editorial, 2004)
- A Fratria Órfã (Editora Olho d'Água, 2008)
- O Tempo e o Cão (Boitempo Editorial, 2010), translated in English as Time and the Dog (Verso Books, 2018)
- 18 crônicas e mais algumas (Boitempo Editorial, 2011)
