= Carmen Dolores (writer) =

Brazilian writer

- Born: Emília Moncorvo Bandeira de Melo; 11 March 1852
- Died: 16 August 1910 (aged 58)
- Other names: Júlia de Castro; Leonel Sampaio; Célia Márcia; Mário Villar
- Occupation: Writer
- Known for: Crônicas

Emília Moncorvo Bandeira de Melo (1852–1910) was a Brazilian poet and play-writer who commonly wrote under the pseudonym Carmen Dolores. Other pseudonyms she used were Júlia de Castro, Leonel Sampaio, Célia Márcia, and Mário Villar. She was best known for publishing short stories, novels, plays, literacy criticism, and journalistic essays or crônicas.

== Life ==
Emília Moncorvo de Figueiredo was born on March 11, 1852, in Rio de Janeiro, Brazil to Dr. Carlos Honório de Figueiredo and D. Emília Moncorvo de Figueiredo. Raised by a traditional upper-class family, she received an education and initially, began writing as a hobby. She married Dr. Jerónimo Bandeira de Melo and had four children, including Cecilia Bandeira de Melo, a prominent and successful writer in the 1920s.

Shortly after her husband death, she became a writer and frequently contributed to the newspapers O País and Correio da Manhã. Her weekly column in O País featured crônicas and brief nonfiction pieces about Brazilian life. The crônicas demonstrated Dolores activism for women's rights, arguing for fair wage legislation, educational reform, and the repealing of anti-divorce laws in Brazil.

== Work and influence ==
In 1910, a collection of the crônicas was published in book form as Ao Esvoaçar da Idéia ("On the Fluttering of an Idea"). Her work emphasized women's rights to education, divorce, and women's work. She related feminist writers, such as Virginia Woolf and Nisia Floresta to women's roles in society.

Dolores' works were well received in Brazil during her lifetime, though some critics found her style more "masculine" (i.e. more forceful and self-assured) than was thought proper for a woman. Critic writer, Afonso Henriques de Lima Barreto, in an otherwise highly positive appreciation of her work, criticized the Crônicas for their sharp social commentary.

== Publications ==
- Gradações, 1894-1986 (1897)
- Um drama na roça (1907)
- Ao esvaçar da idéia (1910)
- A Luta(1911)
- Brazilian Tales (1921)
- Almas complexas (1934)
- Crônicas 1905-1910 (1998)
