= Cassandra Rios =

Brazilian author (1932–2002)

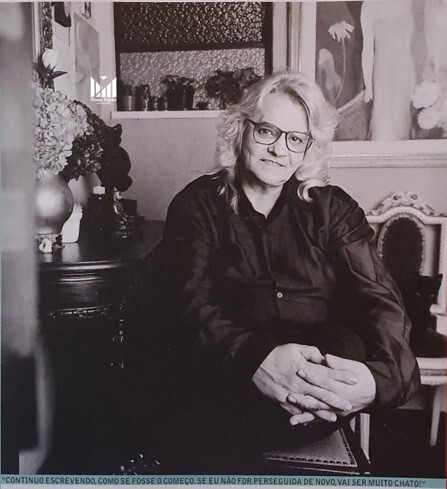
- Born: 1932; São Paulo, Brazil
- Died: March 8, 2002 (aged 69); São Paulo, Brazil
- Writing career
- Genre: lesbian erotica
- Notable work: A volúpia do pecado

Cassandra Rios (born Odete Rios, 1932 – 8 March 2002) was a Brazilian fiction, mystery, and specially lesbian erotica author.

She wrote more than 40 novels, and was the first Brazilian female writer who sold more than one million books. She was the most censored artist during the Brazilian military dictatorship, with her books being considered "pornographic".

== Life and career ==
Odete Rios was born in São Paulo, growing up in the Perdizes neighborhood. Her parents were Spanish outcasts from Spanish Civil War. She published her first book, A volúpia do pecado, in 1948; the novel, a love story between two teenage girls, was rejected by all publishers. Rios borrowed money from her mother (under the condition she should not read the book) adopted the pen name Cassandra and self-published the book, which became a best-seller, and would be taken off the shelves in 1962, for its 'immoral content'.

Rios wrote more than 40 books during her lifetime, most of them dealing with eroticism and homosexuality; she became the first Brazilian author to sell one million copies and the first one to live exclusively off her books. After the Brazilian military coup, around 30 of her titles were taken off circulation by the official censorship, for "pornographic content". Rios was often called to interrogation at DOPS, went bankrupt, and resorted to publishing by a male pseudonym, Oliver Rivers.

After the end of the dictatorship, in 1985, Rios joined the Democratic Labor Party and ran for São Paulo state deputy in 1986, unsuccessfully. In 1990 she had a radio show at Rádio Bandeirantes.

== Death ==
Cassandra Rios died on 8 March 2002, in São Paulo, of uterine cancer.
