= Márcio Souza (writer) =

Brazilian journalist and writer (1946–2024)

- Born: Márcio Gonçalves Bentes de Souza; March 4, 1946; Manaus, Amazonas, Brazil
- Died: August 12, 2024 (aged 78); Manaus, Amazonas, Brazil
- Occupation: Writer • journalist
- Website: www.marciosouza.com.br

Márcio Gonçalves Bentes de Souza (March 4, 1946 – August 12, 2024) was a Brazilian journalist and writer, recognized for his focus on the Amazon basin.

== Biography ==
Márcio was born in Manaus, Amazonas. As a young man he began working as a film critic in the newspaper O Trabalhista, of which his father was a partner. In 1965, he took over the coordination of the editions of the government of the State of Amazonas, but soon afterwards he moved to São Paulo and entered the social sciences course at the University of São Paulo (USP). Pursued by the military dictatorship, he interrupted his studies in 1969 and began his professional life in cinema, as a critic, screenwriter and director. In dramaturgy, he wrote pieces like "As folias do látex" and "Tem piranha no pirarucu".

With the work "Galvez – Imperador do Acre", he began his literary career in 1976. He wrote several works inserted in the socio-cultural environment of the Amazon, such as Mad Maria, Plácido de Castro contra o Bolivian Syndicate, Zona Franca, meu amor, Silvino Santos: o cineasta do ciclo da borracha, among others.

Between 1981 and 1982 he published in novels, in the newspaper Folha de S. Paulo, the novel A Resistível Ascensão do Boto Tucuxi.

He also stood out as a filmmaker and essayist (A selva; A expressão amazonense do neolítico à sociedade de consumo). More recently, it has been dedicated to a tetralogy about the years in which the former Província do Grão-Pará, which throughout the colonial period was a State separate from the State of Brazil, went through the serious crisis of its annexation to Brazil And of revolts against the power of Rio de Janeiro and/or against social inequality, of which blacks and Native Brazilians were particularly affected.

=== Death ===
Márcio Souza died in Manaus on August 12, 2024, at the age of 78.

== Fiction ==
- Galvez – Imperador do Acre (1976)
- Operação Silêncio (1978)
- Mad Maria (1980)
- A Resistível Ascensão do Boto Tucuxi (1982)
- A Ordem do Dia (1983)
- A Condolência (1984)
- O Brasileiro Voador (1985) – a biography of Alberto Santos-Dumont
- O Fim do Terceiro Mundo (1989)
- A Caligrafia de Deus (1993)
- Tetralogy: Crônicas do Grão-Pará and Rio Negro
  - Lealdade (1997)
  - Desordem (2001)
  - Revolta (2005)
  - Derrota (200?)

== Theatre ==
- Teatro Completo I
- Teatro Completo II
- Teatro Completo III

== Essay ==
- Mostrador de Sombras (1969)
- A Expressão Amazonense (1977)
- O Empate Contra Chico Mendes (1986)
- Breve História da Amazônia (1992)
- Anavilhanas, O Jardim do Rio Negro (1996)
