= Márcia Denser =

Brazilian journalist and writer (1949–2024)

- Born: 23 May 1949 São Paulo, Brazil
- Died: 5 April 2024 (aged 74) São Paulo, Brazil
- Occupation: Journalist, writer
- Language: Portuguese
- Education: Mackenzie Presbyterian University, Pontifícia Universidade Católica de São Paulo
- Genres: Novels, short stories
- Years active: 1977–2024

Márcia Denser (23 May 1949 – 5 April 2024) was a Brazilian journalist and writer.

== Biography ==
Denser was born in São Paulo and was educated at Mackenzie Presbyterian University and the Pontifícia Universidade Católica de São Paulo. From 1977 to 1979, Denser was an editor and columnist for the magazine Nova. She also contributed to Folha de S.Paulo, Interview, Vogue and Salles Inter/americana de Publicidade. Later, she directed research into contemporary Brazilian literature at the Idart Cultural Center in São Paulo.

Her first collection of short stories Tango Fantasma (Ghost Tango) was published in 1977. Denser edited and organized two anthologies of erotic short stories by women: Muito Prazer (Much pleasure) published in 1982 and O Prazer é Todo Meu (The pleasure is all mine) published in 1984.

Some of her short stories have been translated into English: "The Vampire of Whitehouse Lane" appears in the anthology One Hundred Years After Tomorrow (Brazilian women in the 20th century) and "Last Tango in Jacobina" appears in Urban Voices, Contemporary Short Stories from Brazil.

Denser died in São Paulo on 5 April 2024, at the age of 74.

== Selected works ==
- O Animal dos Motéis (Animal of motels), novel in episodes (1981)
- Exercícios para o Pecado (Exercises for sin), short novels (1984)
- Diana Caçadora (Diana the huntress), short stories (1986)
- A Ponte das Estrelas (The tip of stars), novel (1990)
- Toda Prosa (All prose), short stories (2002)
- Os Apóstolos (The Apostles), anthology (2002)
- Caim (Cain), novel (2005)
