= Patrícia Bins =

Brazilian novelist, artist, journalist and translator

Patrícia Doreen Bins (1930–2008) was a Brazilian novelist, artist, journalist and translator.

== Personal life ==
Bins was of English and Hungarian descent.

== Works ==
- Jogo de fiar [Spinning game]. Rio de Janeiro: Nova Fronteira, 1983.
- Antes que o amor acabe [Before love ends]. 1984.
