= List of Brazilian poets =

This is a list of notable Brazilian poets.

== A ==
- Adalgisa Nery
- Adélia Prado
- Ademir Antonio Bacca
- Affonso Romano de Sant'Anna
- Afonso Schmidt
- Alberto de Oliveira
- Alphonsus de Guimaraens
- Alvarenga Peixoto
- Álvares de Azevedo (1831–1852)
- Amália dos Passos Figueiroa
- Ana Paula Arendt
- Ana Cristina César
- Anderson Bigode Herzer
- Artur de Azevedo
- Augusto de Campos
- Augusto dos Anjos
- Augusto Meyer

== B ==
- Basílio da Gama
- Bento Teixeira
- Berta Celeste Homem de Melo

== C ==
- Carlos Drummond de Andrade
- Carlos Nejar
- Cassiano Ricardo
- Castro Alves
- Casimiro de Abreu
- Cecília Meireles
- Cláudio Manuel da Costa
- Coelho Neto
- Cora Coralina
- Cruz e Sousa

== D ==
- Davino Ribeiro de Sena
- Décio Pignatari
- Dora Vasconcellos

== E ==
- Eduardo Kac
- Eli Heil
- Esmeralda Ribeiro

== F ==
- Ferreira Gullar
- Filinto de Almeida
- Frederico Barbosa

== G ==
- Gregório de Matos
- Gonçalves Dias
- Gustavo Dourado

== H ==
- Haroldo de Campos

== J ==
- João Cabral de Melo Neto
- João Guimarães Rosa
- Jorge de Lima
- Julia da Costa
- Junqueira Freire
- Júlio Prestes

== K ==
- Kátya Chamma

== L ==
- Laurindo Rabelo
- Lourdes Teodoro
- Lupe Cotrim

== M ==
- Machado de Assis
- Manuel Bandeira
- Márcio-André
- Mário de Andrade
- Menotti del Picchia
- Murilo Mendes
- Mario Quintana

== O ==
- Olavo Bilac
- Oswald de Andrade

== P ==
- Paulo Leminski

== R ==
- Raimundo Arruda Sobrinho
- Raimundo Correia
- Raul Bopp
- Ricardo Domeneck
- Roberto Piva
- Ronald de Carvalho

== S ==
- Santa Rita Durão

== T ==
- Taiguara
- Tomás Antônio Gonzaga
- Torquato Neto

== V ==
- Vicente de Carvalho
- Vinícius de Moraes

== W ==
- Waly Salomão

== See also ==
- Portuguese poetry
- Portuguese literature
