= Lupe Cotrim =

Brazilian poet and university professor

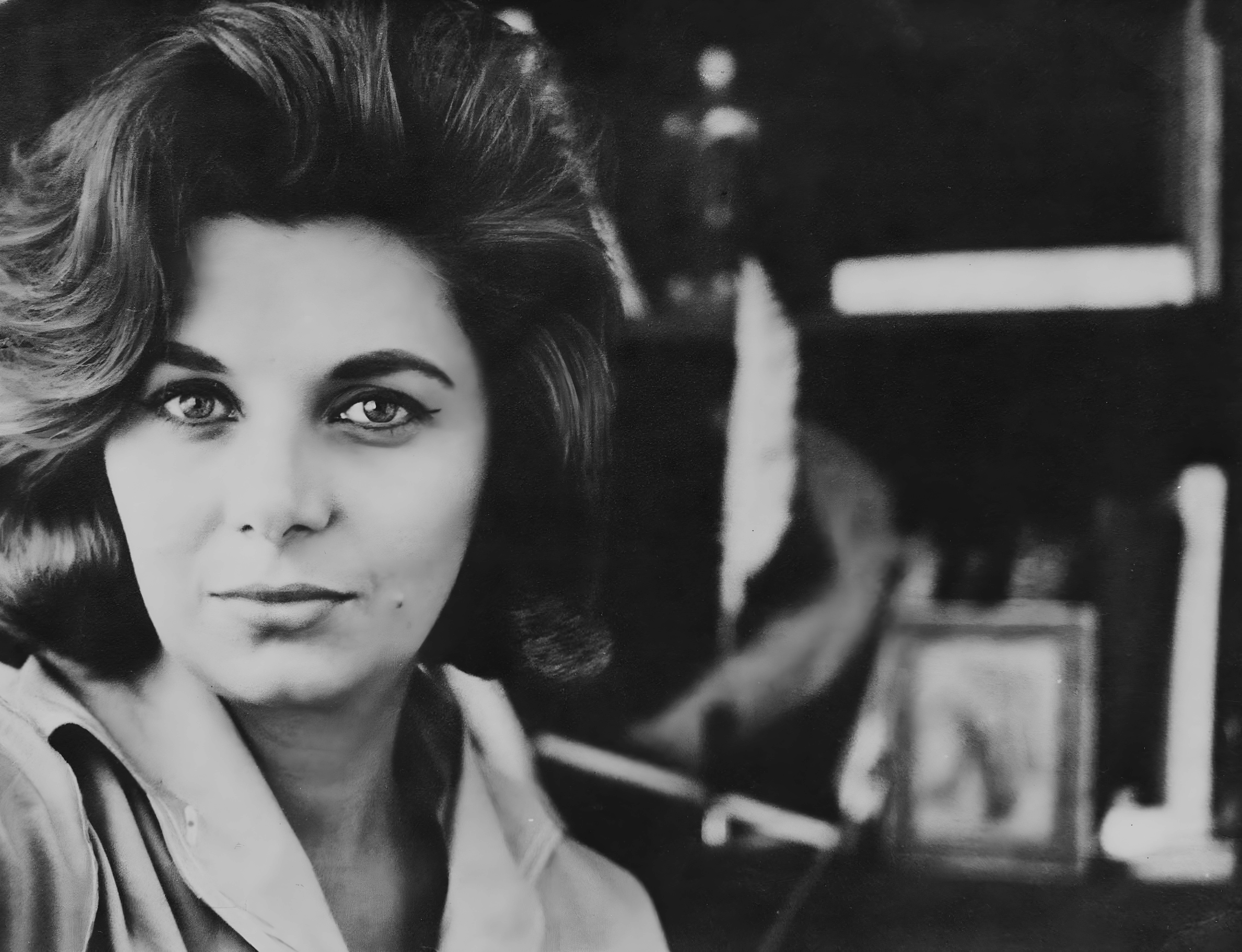
- Born: Maria José Cotrim Garaude; March 16, 1933; São Paulo, Brazil
- Died: February 18, 1970 (aged 36); Campos do Jordão, Brazil
- Education: University of São Paulo
- Occupations: Poet, translator, writer, university professor
- Spouse: José Arthur Giannotti
- Awards: Prêmio Jabuti (poetry, Brazilian Book Chamber (CBL))

Lupe Cotrim or Lupe Cotrim Garaude (baptismal name: Maria José Cotrim Garaude) (São Paulo, March 16, 1933 – Campos do Jordão, February 18, 1970) was a Brazilian poet and university professor.

Lupe is a prominent figure among the Brazilian poets that emerged in the second half of the 20th century. With a philosophical background, her work is marked by a cultured, aristocratic and sober language, in which she used symbols and metaphors to express herself, doing so with remarkable economy of words. Lupe Cotrim developed her own independent path, moving from confessional and intimate poetry to poetry marked by social criticism. As a teacher, she taught in the first years of the School of Communications and Arts at the University of São Paulo (Escola de Comunicações e Artes – ECA/USP), whose academic center bears her name Centro Acadêmico Lupe Cotrim (CALC).

The author published seven books in her lifetime, and two were published posthumously. The collection of her works is deposited at the Institute of Brazilian Studies (Instituto de Estudos Brasileiros – IEB). Lupe Cotrim died, at the age of 36, as a result of cancer. Since 2007, the Institute of Brazilian Studies (IEB) has been the depository of the professor-poet's collection.

== Life and career ==
Maria José Cotrim Garaude was born on March 16, 1933, in the city of São Paulo to Maria de Lourdes Lins Cotrim and Dr. Pedro Garaude. She was nicknamed Lupe from childhood, a reference to the first syllables of her parents' prenames. Lupe Cotrim moved with her family to Araçatuba and spent her childhood there. After her parents' separation, she and her mother moved to the city of Rio de Janeiro, where she studied at Bennett School. In 1949, she moved back to São Paulo to be closer to her father and integrate into the city's cultural environment.

Lupe Cotrim completed her secondary education at Des Oiseaux School and graduated in Library science and Culture at the Sedes Sapientiae Institute in São Paulo. Still in the 1950s, she studied literature, languages, arts, and lyric singing.

Between 1961 and 1963, Lupe Cotrim presented, together with journalist Joaquim Pinto Nazário, the TV program A Semana Passada a Limpo, (Note: A possible translation into English would be Last Week in Review) in which they discussed the week's events in the fields of politics, literature, and arts. Previously she produced and presented, together with writer Helena Silveira, the program Mulher, Confidencialmente, (Note: In English is Woman, Confidentially) both aired on São Paulo television channels. Cotrim worked at the Caixa Econômica Federal between 1963 and 1967, at the invitation of Joaquim Pinto Nazário, then vice-president of the bank. She also worked as an Actor, making a brief appearance in A Morte da Strip-Teaser (1969), (Note: In English is The Death of the Striptease) the first short film by director Eduardo Leone.

At the age of 30, with four published books and the fifth on its way, Lupe Cotrim took the exams to graduate in philosophy at the College of Philosophy, Sciences and Literature of the University of São Paulo (Faculdade de Filosofia, Ciências e Letras – FFCL/USP). She entered the course in 1963 and graduated in 1966. Cotrim sought in Philosophy conditions to reflect on language, rethink the effusion of the lyrical self in her writing, and better understand the world. In this period, based on works by Carlos Drummond de Andrade, João Cabral de Melo Neto, and Francis Ponge, she discovered possibilities of a certain kind of "phenomenological poetry."

In correspondence with the poet Carlos Drummond de Andrade, his friend and interlocutor, Lupe Cotrim said that:

I entered the faculty of Philosophy, the one I had been in love from afar for years. My fulfillment as a poet will only be realized to the extent of my conception of the world – I want to give [my poetry] the objectivity it needs. [And communicated to her friend:] You can't imagine how admired and loved you are among the professors (all young, cultured, intelligent, a Brazil of great hope). Your poetry is felt and understood deep inside.

At the same university, Lupe Cotrim started her doctorate in Aesthetics, under the guidance of Gilda de Mello e Souza, with research on the poetics of the French writer Francis Ponge, however, as a result of her premature death – in 1970 due to cancer – she did not finish it.

=== Poetic journey ===
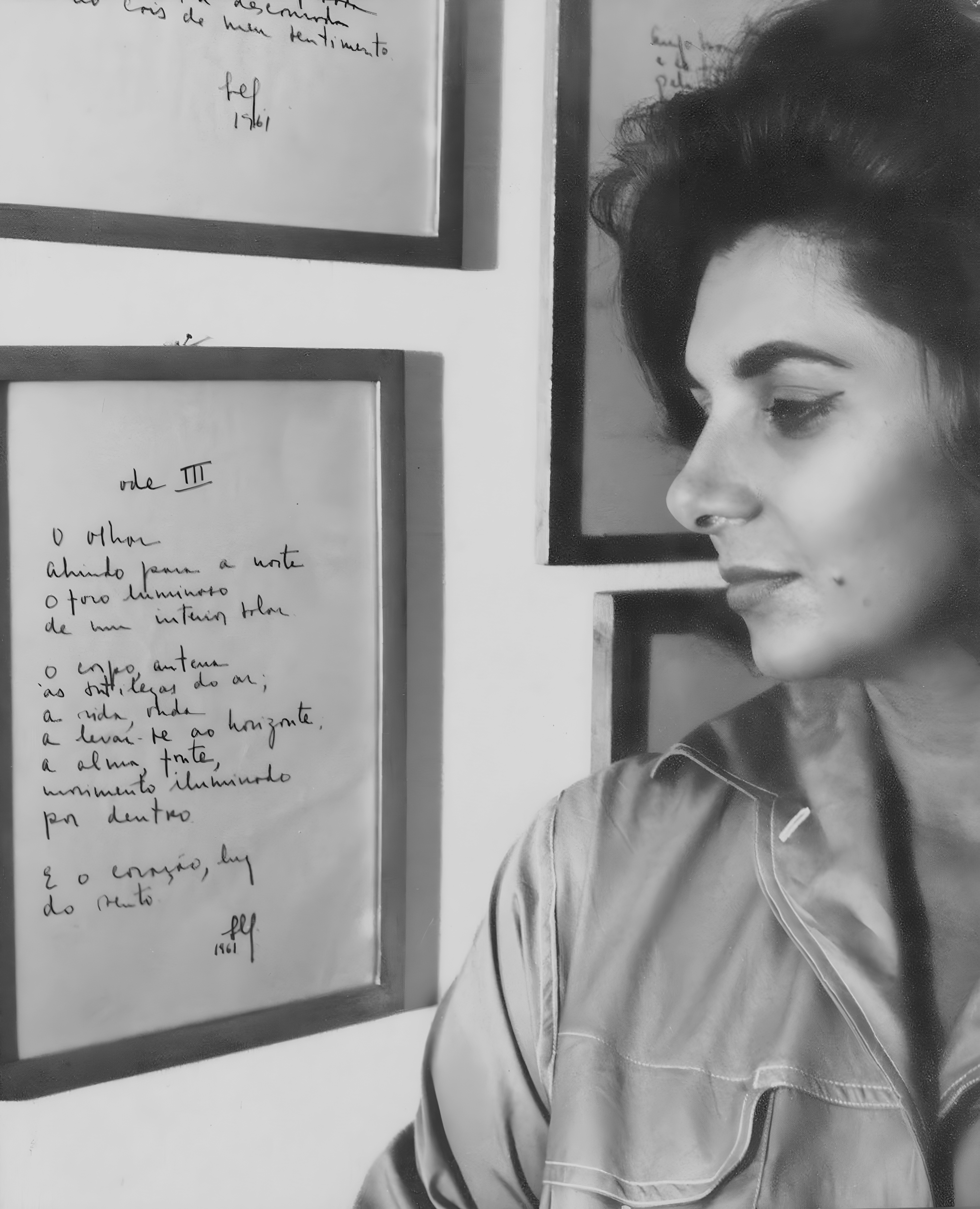
Lupe Cotrim at a poetry show, 1961

Among the Brazilian poets that appeared in the second half of the 20th century, Lupe Cotrim is a prominent figure. According to the poet and critic Cesar Leal, regarding Cotrim's style, "her cultured, sober and aristocratic language uses symbols and metaphors with surprising economy of words".

Initially, her work was marked by the formalist subjectivism and attachment to the sublime of the 1945s poets, however, Lupe developed her own independent path transitioning from confessional and intimate lyricism to a social criticism marked poetry, in which an elliptical and anti-oratorical language emerges.

Lupe's debut book, Monólogos do Afeto (1956), with illustrations by Darcy Penteado, was well received by the critics and considered one of the main poetry releases of the year. During this period, Cotrim traveled to Rio de Janeiro to promote her work and met the writer Carlos Drummond de Andrade, with whom she cultivated dialogue and exchanged letters. From 1956 until 1970, she released six more works, among them, Entre a Flor e o Tempo: poesia (1961) which brought a book flap text written by journalist and writer Cassiano Ricardo, presenting the work as a "fascinating lyrical adventure".

Poemas ao Outro, published in 1970 by the State Council of Culture, with a preface by the writer André Carneiro, evidences social concern, resonating an ethical demand present in the Brazilian culture of the 1950s–1960s. The work received the Jabuti Award, the Governador do Estado Award, and the poetry award from the Cultural Foundation of the Federal District.

In partnership with José Arthur Giannotti, Cotrim also translated the essay Sciences humaines et philosophie by the French philosopher and critic Lucien Goldmann. After Lupe Cotrim's death, two more of her works were published: Obra Consentida (1973), composed of a selection of poems from her first five books, and the anthology Encontro (1984), organized by a critical review by the teacher and poet Cacaso.

=== Influences ===
Lupe Cotrim considered herself a post-Drummondian poet, having been influenced by the poetry of Carlos Drummond de Andrade. When reflecting on her works, she considered the first phase of her poetic production "outdated" and stated that "with Inventos, a new epoch of poetry began in me. I stopped seeing myself, stopped showing myself by seeking to give a new facet of my poetry".

From the epigraphs of Lupe's first two books, one can see the influences of Provençal troubadours such as Ranier Maria Rilke, Giraut de Borneil, Paul Verlaine, Rabindranath. Among the Hispanics, Juan Ramón Jimenez was one of her favorite poets having repercussions in her first poems. From him, Lupe Cotrim selected poems that were published in the newspaper O Estado de S. Paulo. Among the Brazilians are Carlos Drummond de Andrade, Manuel Bandeira, Cecília Meireles, Vinícius de Moraes, and others.

In her readings, Lupe Cotrim went into areas such as literature, philosophy, and the social sciences, studying texts from psychoanalysis, Simone de Beauvoir's essayistic feminism, and works by authors such as Michel Foucault, Merleau-Ponty, Karl Marx, Heidegger, and Lévi-Strauss.

=== Critical reception ===
Lupe's work have been praised by journalists, literary critics and writers, such as César Leal, Lygia Fagundes Telles and Cacaso.

In 1983, the 50th anniversary year of Lupe Cotrim's birth, Renata Pallottini, a poet and also her friend, dedicated a poem to her:

Every poet is a flower that remains/Aerial and frank sword/Against death. Every poet is a color that remains/In the surviving gaze/And in the light of mornings that always return/Lupe/Light of blue/Distant beauty/Antenna over space/Warm flesh/Spoken syllable, nightmares/Transience that is forgotten/And in the struggle for life/Passing/Any poet is a pain that remains.

=== Teaching ===
In 1968, Lupe Cotrim was invited by Professor Julio Garcia Morejón, director of the then School of Cultural Communications (Escola de Comunicações Culturais), later renamed the School of Communications and Arts (Escola de Comunicações e Artes), to join the founding professors of this School. Initially, Lupe declined the invitation, stating that he did not know enough about Philosophy to take on a university class, however, eventually accepted and began teaching Aesthetics in the Department of Historical and Philosophical Studies (Departamento de Estudos Históricos e Filosóficos), which was later renamed the Department of Communications and Arts (Departamento de Comunicações e Artes). Her remarkable performance facing the challenges of the newly created USP unit and, at the same time, the adverse political conjuncture the country was going through mobilized the students to honor her, naming, in 1970, the school's academic center Centro Acadêmico Lupe Cotrim (CALC).

Ismail Xavier, a university professor and also a former student of Lupe Cotrim, notes that the poet-professor conducted the dialogue with the students in a skillful and sensitive manner, expressing her way of being and existing in the world. For him:

She left her mark and her inspiration as a poet and teacher, someone whose frank dialogue generated debates in which she exposed herself in that intense way that was characteristic of her, and made us live the cultural moment in greater depth, whether in discussing art exhibitions, in particular the São Paulo Art Biennial, films or plays; all done in such a way as to connect the more conceptual reflection on the arts and the course of aesthetics to the critical activity directed at the contemporary.

== Works ==
Lupe published seven books of lyric poetry between the years 1956 and 1970 and had two works published posthumously. Since 2007, the Institute of Brazilian Studies (Instituto de Estudos Brasileiros – IEB) has been the depository of the poet-professor's collection.

=== List of works ===
- 1984: Encontro – Anthology of poems selected by Marco Giannotti.
- 1973: Obra Consentida
- 1970: Poemas ao Outro
- 1967: Inventos: poesia
- 1964: O Poeta e o Mundo: poesia
- 1963: Cânticos da Terra (Note: Although Gouvêa indicates that the work "Cânticos da Terra" would have been published in 1962, the year of the first edition dates back to 1963, according to the Bibliographic Data Bank of USP.)
- 1961: Entre a Flor e o Tempo: poesia
- 1959: Raiz Comum
- 1956: Monólogos do Afeto

== Awards ==
- 1969 – Governador do Estado Award, poetry category – With the work Poemas ao Outro.
- 1969 – Poetry award of the Cultural Foundation of the Federal District.
- 1970 - 12th Jabuti Award, poetry category - With the work Poemas ao Outro (posthumous).

== See also ==
- Carlos Drummond de Andrade
- Manuel Bandeira
- Cecília Meireles
- Vinícius de Moraes
- Ranier Maria Rilke
- Giraut de Borneil
- Paul Verlaine
- Rabindranath
- Juan Ramón Jimenez

== Bibliography ==
- Garaude, Lupe Cotrim (1956). Monólogos do Afeto (in Portuguese). São Paulo: Edigraf.
- Garaude, Lupe Cotrim (1959). Raiz Comum (in Portuguese). Rio de Janeiro: Civilização Brasileira.
- Garaude, Lupe Cotrim (1961). Entre a Flor e o Tempo: poesia (in Portuguese). Rio de Janeiro: José Olympio.
- Garaude, Lupe Cotrim (1963). Cânticos da Terra (in Portuguese). São Paulo: Massao Ono.
- Garaude, Lupe Cotrim (1964). O Poeta e o Mundo: poesia (in Portuguese). Rio de Janeiro: José Olympio.
- Garaude, Lupe Cotrim (1967). Inventos: poesia (in Portuguese). Rio de Janeiro: José Olympio.
- Garaude, Lupe Cotrim (1970). Poemas ao Outro (in Portuguese). São Paulo: Conselho Estadual de Cultura.
- Garaude, Lupe Cotrim (1973). Obra Consentida (in Portuguese). São Paulo: Brasiliense.
- Garaude, Lupe Cotrim (1984). Encontro (in Portuguese). São Paulo: Brasiliense.
- Goldmann, Lucien (1974). Ciências Humanas e Filosofia: Que é a Sociologia (in Portuguese). São Paulo: Difel.
- Gouvêa, Leila V.B. (2010). "Ser poeta: Lupe Cotrim, 40 anos depois". ARS – Revista do Departamento de Artes Plásticas. No. 15 (in Portuguese). Vol. 8. São Paulo: USP.
- Gouvêa, Leila Vilas Boas (2011). Estrela breve : Lupe Cotrim : uma biografia literária (in Portuguese). São Paulo, SP, Brasil: I-Danos. ISBN 978-85-7060-962-5. OCLC 809989091.
- Marina Cláudia (1990). Lupe Cotrim (in Portuguese). São Paulo: Universidade de São Paulo, Escola de Comunicações e Artes. ISBN 85-7205-008-6. OCLC 27857604.
