= Sobrinho =

Sobrinho is a surname. Notable people with the surname include:

- Adi Sobrinho (Born 1985), a Brazilian footballer.
- Álvaro de Oliveira Madaleno Sobrinho (Born 1962), a Portuguese businessman and Founder of Planet Earth Institute.
- Alexandre José Barbosa Lima Sobrinho (Born 1897), a Brazilian lawyer, writer, historian, essayist, journalist and politician.
- Eduardo Jorge Martins Alves Sobrinho (Born 1949), a Brazilian physician and politician.
- Jean Theodoro Sobrinho (Born 1993), a Brazilian footballer.
- José Batista Sobrinho (Born 1933), a Brazilian businessman.
- João Pires Sobrinho (Born 1934), a Brazilian sprinter.
- José Cardoso Sobrinho O. Carm (Born 1933), a Brazilian archbishop, professor, academic, lawyer and theologian, current archbishop emeritus of the Archdiocese of Olinda and Recife.
- Júlio Pires Ferreira Sobrinho (1868–1930), a Brazilian lawyer, Portuguese professor and philologist.
- Lavoisier Maia Sobrinho (Born 1928), a Brazilian doctor, professor and politician.
- Luís Sobrinho (Born 1961), a Portuguese footballer.
- Paulo Roberto Teles De Goes Sobrinho (Born 1983), a Brazilian footballer.
- Raimundo Arruda Sobrinho (Born 1 August 1938 ), a Brazilian poet and writer.
- Tarcísio Pereira de Magalhães Sobrinho (Professionally Tarcísio Meira) (Born 1935), a Brazilian actor.

== See also ==
- Estádio Major José Levy Sobrinho, multi-use stadium in Limeira
