= The Brazilian Planter =

Book by José Mariano da Conceição Velloso

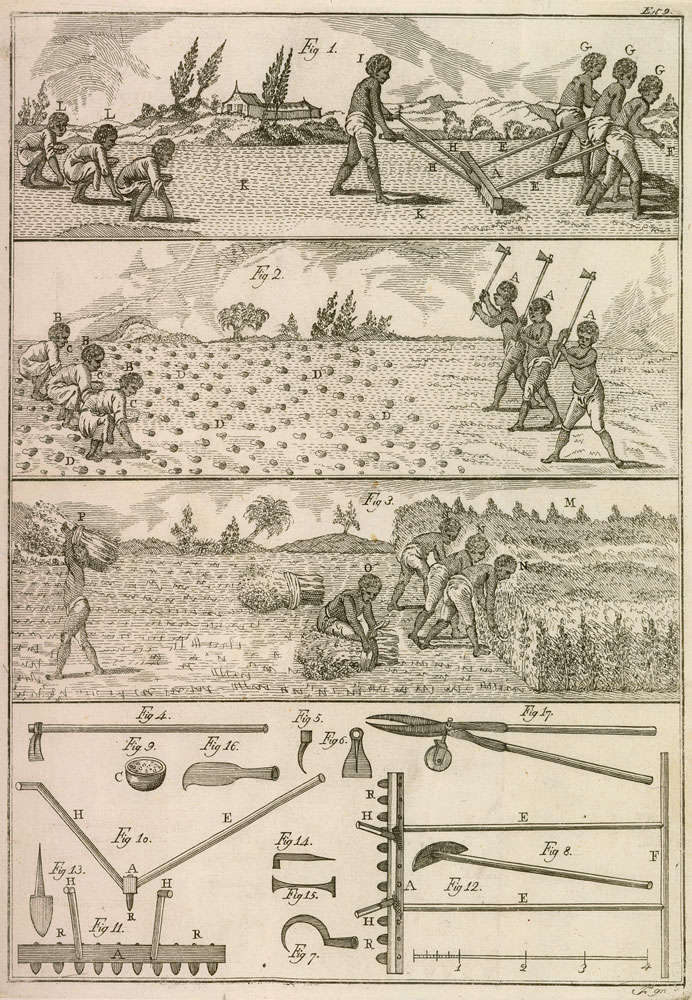
A page from the work illustrating the cultivation of indigo.

O Fazendeiro do Brasil (The Brazilian Planter) is the brief title of an eleven-volume work compiled by José Mariano de Conceição Vellozo. It describes Agriculture in Brazil during the colonial period.

== Details ==
One of the rarest books about Brazil published before independence, it was published in Lisbon by the publishing house Casa Literária do Arco do Cego. Topics covered include coffee and chocolate, as well as contemporary technology of farming. The content was intended to stimulate agricultural productivity in Brazil, by incorporating content created in other countries.

The illustrated volumes were published between 1798 and 1806.

== Complete collections and digitization ==
In Brazil, only the National Library of Brazil and the private archive of the collector José Mindlin contain the complete series of eleven volumes. In 2006 the Institute of Brazilian Studies — IEB — completed the digitization of the work as part of a project to enrich the digital sphere with content about colonial Brazil.
