= Vocabulario Portuguez e Latino =

First dictionary of the Portuguese language

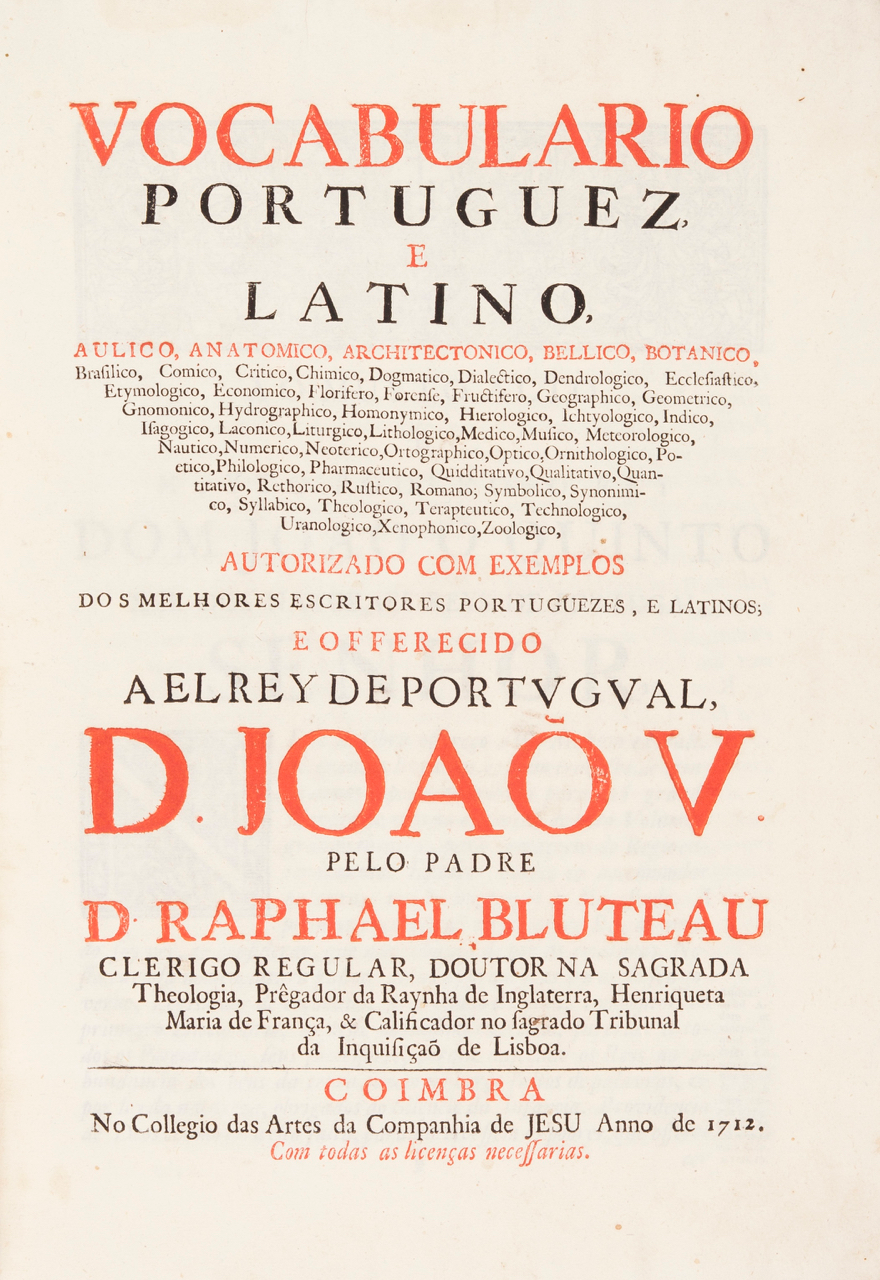
Title page.

The Vocabulário Português e Latino (in the original spelling, Vocabulario portuguez e Latino), better known as the Vocabulário de Bluteau, is considered the first dictionary of the Portuguese language, having been published between 1712 and 1721 by the priest Rafael Bluteau (1638–1734).

The full title of the book is "Vocabulario portuguez e latino, aulico, anatomico, architectonico, bellico, botanico, brasilico, comico, critico, chimico, dogmatico, dialectico, dendrologico, ecclesiastico, etymologico, economico, florifero, forense, fructifero, geographico, geometrico, gnomonico, hydrographico, homonymico, hierologico, ichtyologico, indico, isagogico, laconico, liturgico, lithologico, medico, musico, meteorologico, nautico, numerico, neoterico, ortographico, optico, ornithologico, poetico, philologico, pharmaceutico, quidditativo, qualitativo, quantitativo, rethorico, rustico, romano, symbolico, synonimico, syllabico, theologico, terapeutico, technologico, uranologico, xenophonico, zoologico, autorizado com exemplos dos melhores escritores portuguezes, e latinos".

Comprising about 43.6 thousand entries, it was dedicated to the then king of Portugal by its author, the priest Rafael Bluteau, born in London but residing in Portugal, where he had moved in the year 1668.

In April 2008, the Vocabulário de Bluteau was fully digitized by students and faculty of the Instituto de Estudos Brasileiros (IEB) at the University of São Paulo (USP), and has been available for free public consultation on the Internet since then. It is also accessible on the website of the Biblioteca Nacional Digital of the Biblioteca Nacional de Portugal.
