= Davino Ribeiro de Sena =

Brazilian poet (born 1957)

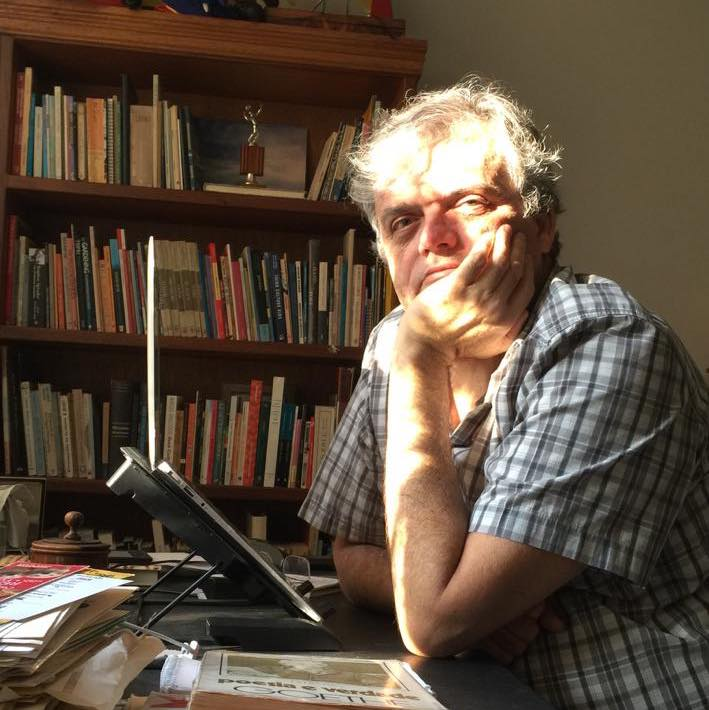
- Born: 1957 (age 68–69); Recife, Pernambuco, Brazil
- Occupations: Diplomat, chronicler and poet
- Writing career
- Movement: Post-Modernism
- Website: davinosena.com.br

Davino Ribeiro de Sena (Recife, 1957) is a diplomat, chronicler, and poet. He is a Philosophy graduate from the Catholic University of Pernambuco and has received several awards for his poetry, including the Nestlé Culture Foundation national prize (1991).

== Biography ==
Davino Ribeiro de Sena graduated in Philosophy from the Catholic University of Pernambuco in 1984. Before that, he had already made a name for himself in poetry, winning a student prize from the Pernambuco Academy of Letters with his sonnet Memórias. In 1989, he entered the diplomatic service, while continuing to pursue literature. His first book of poems, Castelos de Areia (1991), won the Nestlé Culture Foundation's national poetry competition. His literary texts have been widely published, consolidating his position in the poetry scene and attracting the attention of literary critics in academia.

Representing Brazil, Davino Sena took part in the Encuentro Iberoamericano de Poesía in Santiago, Chile, and was included in the anthology Un ángulo del mundo. The particularity of this anthology is that it was put together with the participation of the poets. Each poet selected a poem they considered representative of their work for the occasion. The book offered a unique perspective on many of the most relevant voices, both established and emerging, from across Ibero-America. In 1994, the writer gave a lecture on Brazilian literature at the University of Athens in the United States, and shortly afterward moved to Spain, where he was invited to take part in a round table at the international poetry seminar at the University of Barcelona.

In 1996, he released Pescador de Nuvens, followed by Retrato com Guitarra. After moving to Australia, he published The Jaguar in the Desert and Glass and Iron. In his diplomatic career, he led the Brazilian delegation to the Valdivia Group meeting for the Preservation of the Albatross and served as Brazil's Consul in Japan in 2001.

In 1997, the critic Augusto Massi published a review in Folha de S.Paulo about Davino Ribeiro de Sena's book Pescador de Nuvens. Massi described the work as a “critical paradox,” praising the author's technical skill but noting that the lyricism in the book sometimes verged on sentimentality. Over the course of 33 poems, the reader follows the trajectory of two brothers, Henrique and Euclides, in a narrative that explores their complex family relationships.

Back in Brazil in 2003, he published Três Martes and took part in science and technology cooperation missions in Angola and Mozambique. In partnership with Elizabeth Hazin, he published Lego & Davinovich. He was later appointed Consul in New York, where he launched Expedição in 2007 and gave lectures on poetry in Recife and New York. His poems have also been published in the magazine Poesia Sempre, published by the National Library Foundation. In 2009, he moved to Saudi Arabia and, in the same year, released The Slow Learning of the Boy Who Loved Waves and Stars. Two years later, he settled in London and published O rei das ilhas.

In 2014, he studied creative writing at the University of London. His book Ternura da Água was published in 2015. After living in Sri Lanka (2014), he moved to Liberia (2017), and finally Canada (2019), and then moved to Guatemala (2022), where he currently lives with his wife, Maria do Socorro Melo Pinto, a music teacher, whom he married in 1982. The couple have two daughters: Beatriz, born in 1989, an illustrator, and Alice, born in 1996, a student. Davino Sena recently published a volume of chronicles called Viagens do Conselheiro (2020).

Paulo Henriques Britto highlighted the originality of the poet Davino Ribeiro de Sena, praising him as “one of the best Brazilian poets of his generation.” Britto coined the term “fotoneto” to describe the innovative poetic form created by Davino, which combines narrative and imagery elements with the traditional sonnet structure. The concept was introduced in 1999 in Vidro e Ferro, and reinforced in 2015 with the release of Ternura da Água. Britto analyzes the “fotoneto” as a powerful synthesis of narrative poetry, highlighting its relevance in the contemporary literary scene.

== Published works ==
- Castelos de Areia (1991)
- Pescador de Nuvens (1996)
- O Jaguar no Deserto (1997)
- Retrato com Guitarra (1997)
- Vidro e Ferro (1999)
- Três Martes (2004)
- Lêgo & Davinovich (2006), em parceria com Elizabeth Hazin
- Expedição (2007)
- O Lento Aprendizado do Rapaz que Amava Ondas e Estrelas (2009)
- O Rei das Ilhas (2011)
- Ternura da Água (2015)

== Awards received ==
- Memórias (poem)

Winner of the 1982 Gervásio Fioravanti Award from the Pernambuco Academy of Letters

- Castelos de Areia (author's first book)
- Laureate in the Brazilian Poetry category of the Nestlé Culture Foundation (1991)".
