= Sábato Magaldi =

Brazilian journalist

Sábato Antonio Magaldi (May 9, 1927 – July 14, 2016) was a Brazilian theater critic, playwright, journalist, teacher, essayist and historian.

== Biography ==
Magaldi was born in Belo Horizonte. He graduated in the law course; however, before the age of 20, he wrote his first criticism, of a play by Jean-Paul Sartre, beginning his career as a theater critic. In 1948, he moved to Rio de Janeiro, where he wrote reviews for the newspaper Diário Carioca, replacing Paulo Mendes Campos as a critic. In 1953, Magaldi went to work in São Paulo, exercising his role in the newspapers O Estado de São Paulo and in Jornal da Tarde, starting in 1966.

He was professor of History of the Brazilian Theater at the School of Dramatic Art at the School of Communications and Arts of the University of São Paulo. He also taught for four years at French universities at the University of Paris III (Sorbonne Nouvelle) and University of Provence. He also was the first municipal secretary of Culture of São Paulo, between April 1975 and July 1979, in the Olavo Setúbal administration.

Magaldi was a member of the Brazilian Academy of Letters, being elected on December 8, 1994, taking office in July 1995, occupying the chair No. 24 after Ciro dos Anjos.

== Work ==
Sábato Magaldi was one of the organizers of the work of Nelson Rodrigues, of whom he was a personal friend, and was responsible for the classification of his plays according to theme and genre (Tragedies of Rio, Mythical Pieces and Psychological Pieces).

== Personal life and death ==
Magaldi was married to writer Edla Van Steen.

On July 2, he was admitted to the Samaritano Hospital in São Paulo, with septic shock and pulmonary impairment, and died on July 14, 2016.

== Books written ==
- Panorama do Teatro Brasileiro - Global Editora, 2001
- Iniciação ao Teatro - Editora Ática, 1998
- O Cenário do Avesso - Editora Perspectiva, 1991
- Um Palco Brasileiro - O Arena de São Paulo - Editora Brasiliense
- Dramaturgia e Encenações - Nelson Rodrigues. Editora Perspectiva, 2010
- O Texto no Teatro - Editora Perspectiva
- As Luzes da Ilusão, em parceria com Lêdo Ivo - Global Editora
- Moderna Dramaturgia Brasileira - Editora Perspectiva, 1998
- Depois do Espetáculo - Editora Perspectiva, 2003
- Teatro da Obsessão - Nelson Rodrigues. Editora Global, 2004
- Teatro da Ruptura - Oswald de Andrade. Editora Global, 2003
- Teatro de Sempre - Editora Perspectiva, 2006
- Cem Anos de Teatro em São Paulo - Editora Senac, 2001. Em colaboração com Maria Thereza Vargas
- Edição da obras de Nelson Rodrigues. Teatro Completo - Editora Global, vários volumes
- Teatro Vivo - responsável pela coleção

== See also ==
- Renata Pallottini
