= Morte e Vida Severina =

- Author: João Cabral de Melo Neto
- Language: Portuguese
- Series: Duas Águas
- Genre: Poetry
- Publisher: TUCA
- Publication date: 1955
- Publication place: Brazil
- Pages: 169

Morte e Vida Severina (literally, Severine Life and Death, translated by Elizabeth Bishop as The Death and Life of a Severino) is a play in verse by Brazilian author João Cabral de Melo Neto, one of his most famous and frequently read works. Published in 1955 and written between 1954 and 1955, the play is divided into 18 sections and written in heptasyllabic meter, recalling the cordel, a form of the popular poetry of northeastern Brazil, where Melo Neto was born and lived for most of his life.

Morte e Vida Severina is subtitled Auto de Natal Pernambucano (Auto of Pernambucan Christmas), in reference to both the biblical perspective of the word and in a broader sense of a new beginning for life at its entirety. The play recounts the journey of a retirante called Severino, who, fleeing from the poverty and droughts that ravage the northeastern region of Brazil, follows the Capibaribe River to the fertile lands nearer to the shore and then to the capital city of Recife, only to meet different forms of poverty and exploitation.

The “retirantes” had also been the theme of the famous novel Vidas Secas by Graciliano Ramos, albeit under a very different point of view. The auto evolves into an allegorical account that parallels the Nativity of Jesus and reflects on the possibility for a meaningful life amid the harshness of the sertão.

== Style and structure ==
– My name is Severino,
I have no Christian name.
There are lots of Severinos
(a saint of pilgrimage)
so they began to call me
Maria's Severino.
There are many Severinos
With mothers called Maria,
So I became Marias's
Of Zacarias, deceased.

— João Cabral de Melo Neto (Translated by Elizabeth Bishop), Morte e Vida Severina

Morte e Vida Severina is written in seven-syllable metre. This and the frequent repetitions of the same words and sounds help to create a strong sense of spoken rhythm. The play recounts the journey of a retirante down the Capibaribe river to the city. The auto is formally divided in 18 parts, each compromising a scene, either a dialogue between the retirante and someone or a group of people he encounters in his way or a monologue. In terms of the subject of the poem, it can be analyzed in two sections: a first part, chronicling the retirante's travel to the city, and a second, compromising what follows his arrival.

In the first part, Severino passes through several large sugarcane crops, which makes explicit the inequality of land ownership in the region, as well as discover the arid and desolated characteristics of the life in the sertão, so that the Melo Neto crafts a paradox by describing a life that most truly resembles death than anything else. This contradiction is the central point of the poem.

In the second part, the action is most concentrated on Severino and an old man. Despondent and worn out, the retirante considers taking his own life by throwing himself into the river. They then receive notice that the man's child was born and several people, though destitute, are overtaken with joy and bring the child gifts. The scene may be read as a Christian allegory, recreating the nativity in one of the poorest areas of Recife.

== Analysis ==
Morte e Vida Severina begins describing Severino, a retirante traveling from the barren, drought-striking hinterlands of Pernambuco to Recife, the state's capital. Severino's name comes from the Portuguese word for “severe", severo. While he attempts to identify himself to the audience, he seems unable to separate himself from the others who live on that land. They are united by their common suffering and share a common destiny of famine, poverty and untimely death. The life of Severino is thys exemplary of the life of the retirantes:

"we are many Severinos, equal in everything and in their evil/ (...) And being us all Severinos/ equal in everything in life/ we shall die of equal death/ the same severin death:/ the death that one dies/ of old-age before the thirties/ of ambushes before the twenties/ of famine a bit a day" (translated freely from Portuguese).

In the middle of the play, Severino watches the burial of a husbandman. The scene criticizes the inequality in land ownership and the exploitation of the workers in the farms, as can be seem in the box on the left.

- The grave you're in
Is measured by hand,
The best bargain you got
In all the land.
– You fit it well,
Not too long or deep,
The part of the latifundio
Which you will keep.
– The grave's not too big,
Nor is it too wide,
It's the land you wanted
To see them divide.
– It's a big grave
For a body so spare,
But you’ll be more at ease
Than you ever were.
– You're a skinny corpse
For such a big tomb,
But at least down there
You’ll have plenty of room."

— Death and Life of a Severino Translated by John Milton (2003) Ed. Plêiade. ISBN 8585795948

Much further in the poem, the retirante reaches the city; however, where he expected to find a better scenario than his previous one, he encounters only the belief that he had just been pursuing his own death. There, he meets an unnamed man with whom he discusses life and his musings on attempting suicide by drowning himself in the river. This conversation, however, is interrupted by the birth of a child, a representation of Jesus Christ, and to everyone around starts singing. Many people bring gifts to the boy, but all of a humble kind: crabs that will keep his life from the mud; newspapers to use as covering on cold night; a doll made of mud, between others. Two Egyptian fortune tellers predict a simple future for the boy, who, they say, will remain forever attached to the miserable reality in which he was born.

Melo Neto then closes the poem with the man answering Severino by acknowledging that he does not known if life is in fact worthy of being lived in spite of all the sufferings it engenders, but also claiming that life itself had given him an answer and a message of hope, which is quoted in the following box.

Morte e Vida Severina last stanza

"And there's no better answer

Than to see life

Unravel its thread,

Which is also called life,

See the factory

Life itself stubbornly makes.

See it sprout and grow, like now,

Explode into a new life,

Even when the explosion,

Like that which too place,

Is so small.

Even when it's so puny,

Even when it's that of

A severe, Severino life.”

== Adaptations ==
In 1965, Roberto Freire asked the then-young Chico Buarque to make the work into a musical play. It was released by Chico as his second album the following year.

It was also adapted to cinema, though partially, in 1977 by Zelito Viana; in 1981, TV Globo produced a version.

Also, a black-and-white 3D animated version was made by Miguel Falcão.

Elizabeth Bishop made a partial translation of the poem as The Death and Life of a Severino.

== See also ==
- Brazilian literature
- Brazilian poetry
- Sertão
