= Edla Van Steen =

Brazilian journalist, actress and writer

Edla Van Steen (12 July 1936 – 6 April 2018) was a Brazilian journalist, actress and writer.

The daughter of a Belgian father and a mother of German descent, she was born in Florianópolis, Santa Catarina and educated at a Catholic boarding school.

== Career ==
She began work as a radio broadcaster and then became a journalist in Curitiba. In 1958, she starred in the film Garganta do Diabo (The Devil's Throat), winning several awards for her performance.

She published a book of short stories Cio (In Heat) in 1965; technically it was her second collection of short stories - an earlier manuscript was lost before it could be published. She founded the art gallery Galeria Multipla and served as its director. Her novel Memórias do Medo (Memories of Fear) was published in 1974. In 1981, it was adapted for television.

In 1977, she published her next collection of stories Antes do amanhecer (Before the dawn). The following year, she organized an anthology O Conto da Mulher Brasileira (The Story of the Brazilian Women); she also organized a week in honour of Brazilian writers, sponsored by the São Paulo Ministry of Culture.

Her play O último encontro (The Last Encounter) received the Prêmio Molière and the Prêmio Mambembe for best play as well as a prize awarded by the São Paulo association of art critics. She wrote a second play Bolo de nozes (Nut Cake) in 1990. She translated works by playwrights such as Jean-Claude Brisville, Henrik Ibsen and Manfred Karge for the theatre.

== Personal life ==
Van Steen married Professor Sábato Magaldi.

== Death ==
Van Steen died on 6 April 2018 at the age of 81.

== Selected works ==
- Corações mordidos, novel (1983), translated to English as Village of the Ghost Bells by David George (1991)
- Manto de nuvem (Cloud Blanket), youth literature (1985)
- Até sempre (Until Always), short stories (1985)
- Love Stories: A Brazilian Collection; translated by Elizabeth Lowe (1978)
- A bag of stories (translated by David George; 1991)
- Madrugada (novel; 1992), received the Prêmio Coelho Neto and the best book award from the Pen Club of Brazil
- Cheiro de amor (Fragrance of Love; novel, 1996); received the Prêmio Nestlé de Literatura Brasileira
