= Júlio Pires Ferreira Sobrinho =

Brazilian Portuguese professor (1868–1930)

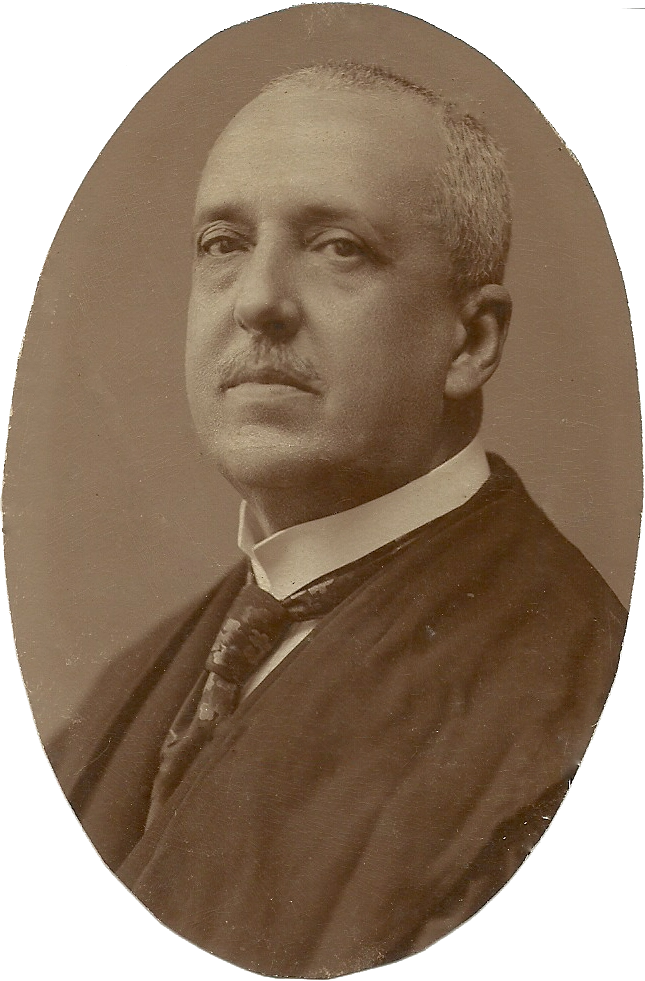
- Born: June 10, 1868; Cabo de Santo Agostinho
- Died: December 31, 1930 (aged 62); Recife
- Education: Recife Law School
- Occupations: Lawyer, professor
- Notable work: Almanach de Pernambuco, Grammatica Portugueza
- Spouse: Albertina Cardoso
- Children: 9
- Parents: Júlio Pires Ferreira Sobrinho (father); Olindina Cleta Pereira da Silva (mother)
- Family: Pires Ferreira

Júlio Pires Ferreira Sobrinho (1868–1930) was a Brazilian Portuguese professor, lawyer and philologist.

== Biography ==
Júlio Pires Ferreira Sobrinho was born on 10 June 1868 in Cabo de Santo Agostinho. Son of Francisco Campello Pires Ferreira and Olindina Cleta Pereira da Silva, he had 8 siblings, being the 5th oldest, and 3 half siblings.

He moved to Recife and graduated in Commercial Law by the Recife Law School in 1888, thus becoming a lawyer. He is also Doctor's in Juridical and Social Sciences by the same school. He then taught Portuguese and Literature in several schools, including Recife Law School, Pernambucan Gymnasium and Normal School (1900–1930). He also worked as examiner in Portuguese exams on state schools, was member of the Superior Council of Public Instruction of Pernambuco and was the president of the Academic Day School. He was also a member of the Archeological, Historic and Geographic Institute of Pernambuco.

Júlio died on 31 December 1930 in Recife.

== Philology ==
Júlio is known for being an important philologist from his time. He published his works during the rise of the alphabetized population due the inauguration of several secondary schools and the transition of the so-called "rationalist lineage", where logic and speculation were used to create a universal view of linguistics, to the "empirical lineage", where historical-comparative methods were used instead. The first lineage understood Portuguese language as a rigid form that came from Portugal, while the second lineage understood the language as constantly changing and addressed for the first time the Brazilian Portuguese branch, even though it was still tied to the Portuguese roots.

Júlio wrote for several magazines and journals, including Almanach de Pernambuco, Diário de Pernambuco, A Procellaria, Heliopolis, Revista de Lingua Portugueza, Revista Brasiliana, Revista de Filologia Portuguesa and Jornal Pequeno, where in 1914 he opened a "grammatical office" to answer questions from students. He wrote his grammar books after Fausto Barreto organized the Portuguese Program for General and Preparatory Exams (1888). His works were cheered by several of his peers, including Clóvis Beviláqua.

Despite his importance in Pernambuco, Júlio's work didn't have a national impact, probably due his geographical distance from Rio de Janeiro. He kept being virtually unknown until at least the XXI century.

== Personal life ==
Júlio married Albertina Cardoso on 8 November 1890 and had 9 children: Lavínia, Olindina, Ruy, Zilpa, Jau, Ary, Albertina, Júlio and Maria da Glória.

In Recife, he lived on Joaquim Nabuco street.

== Honors ==
In 1910, Júlio was chosen as patron from the Bachelors of Science and Letters from Salesiano College.

In 1924, Júlio occupied one of the chairs of the Pernambuco Academy of Letters. His name was already selected by Carneiro Villela in 1901 to be a founding member of the academy, but he denied for believing he had to publish something first before accepting the honor.

== Work ==
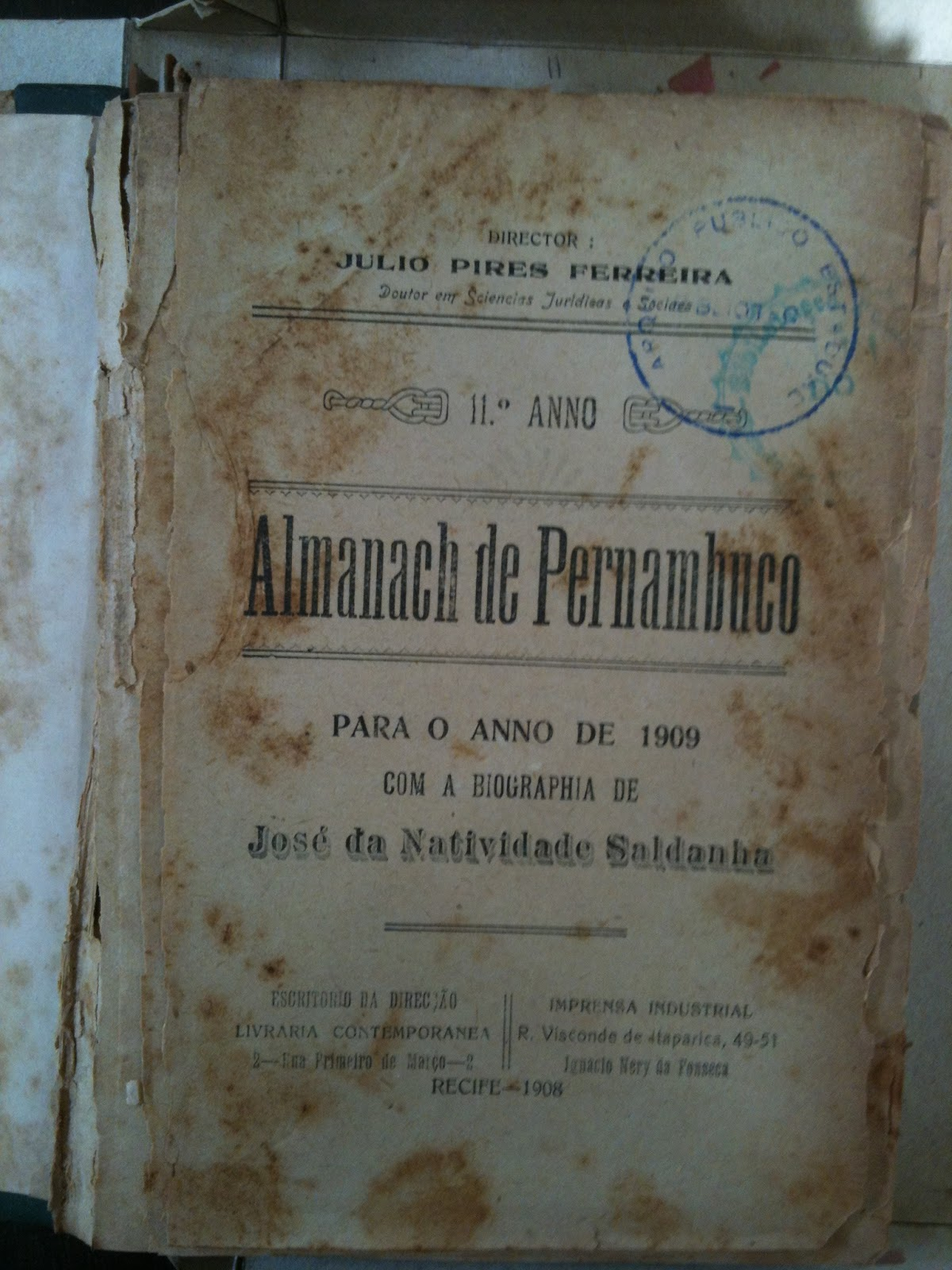
Cover from Almanach de Pernambuco (1909)

- Modilhos (1889)
- Notas sobre a Lingua Portugueza (1893)
- Almanach de Pernambuco (1899–1931)
- Grammatica Portugueza: 1º anno, para uso dos Cursos Primários (1905)
- Grammatica Portugueza: 2º anno, para uso do Curso Médio e do Curso Superior (1905)
- Conceito Jurídico do estabelecimento comercial (1914)
- Consultas sobre a Lingua Portugueza: consultorio do "Jornal Pequeno" (1918)
- Lições de Literatura Portugueza (1917)
- Lições de Literatura Brasileira (1925)
- Direito Comercial
- Geografia e História
- Pontos da História do Brasil
- Manual de Civilidade
