= Gustavo Dourado =

Brazilian teacher, writer and poet

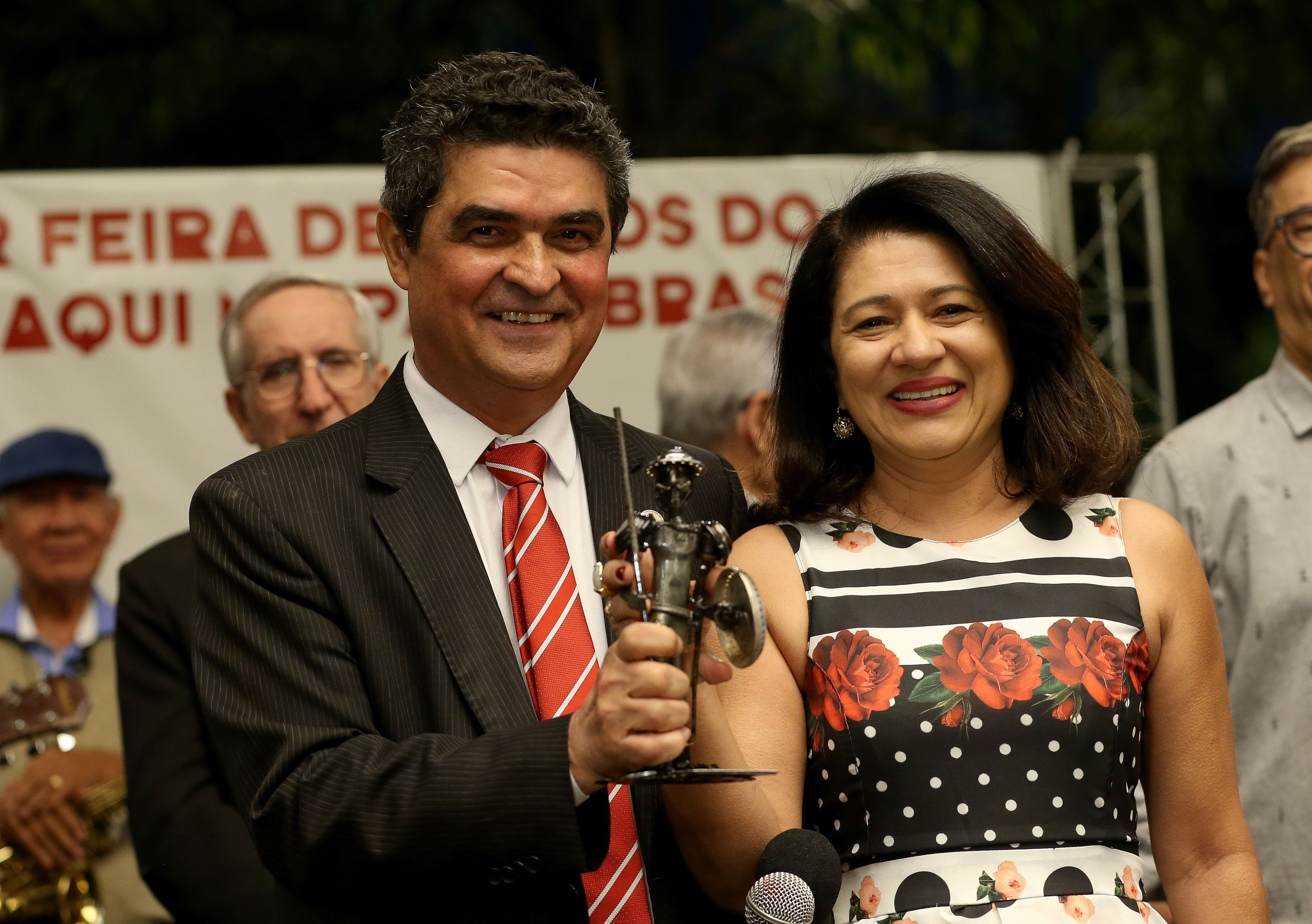
- Born: 1960 (age 65–66); Ibititá
- Occupations: Writer and teacher
- Spouse: Maria Felix Fontele
- Children: Yon Ferreira Dourado, Gustavo Fontele Dourado, Elias Francisco Fontele Dourado
- Writing career
- Genre: Poetry
- Notable works: Phalabora, Linguátomo, Brasília 5.0, Tupynabambárie
- Website: www.gustavodourado.com.br

Gustavo Dourado (born 1960, Ibititá, Bahia) is a Brazilian teacher, writer and poet. Counselor of the Writers' Union of PD and author of 13 books.

He participated and coordinated the Book Fair and the Brasília Film Festival of Brasília. He was invited by the president of Brazil to write a string in honor of Ariano Suassuna. He is also director of the Academy of Arts of Taguatinga.

== Main works ==
- Machado de Assis – 2007
- Twine of Revelation- 2004
- Of Cordell Festivities- 2004
- Hunger- 2002
- Armageddon- 1977
- Film – 2006
- Cordell of Big Brother, The Beasts of the BBB- 2006
