= Grupo Poéticas Digitais =

Arts centre at the University of São Paulo

The Grupo Poéticas Digitais (Digital Poetics Group) is a multidisciplinary center that promotes the development of experimental projects and the reflection about the impact of the new technologies in the field of arts.

It was created in 2002 in the Fine Art's Department of University of São Paulo (USP), as an offshoot of wAwRwT project initiated by Gilbertto Prado in 1995.

The Group has as participants professors, artists, researchers and undergraduate and postgraduate students, working in different compositions in each project.

== Projects ==
- Acaso 30 (2005)
- Cozinheiro das Almas (2006)
- Incógnito (2007)
- Desluz (2009)
- Pedralumen (2009)
- Amoreiras (2010)
- Catavento (2011)
- Encontros (2012)

== Participants ==
Take part of the group in 2014:

- Gilbertto Prado
- Agnus Valente
- Claudio Bueno
- Ellen Nunes
- Leonardo Lima
- Maria Luiza Fragoso
- Maurício Trentin
- Nardo Germano
- Andrei Thomaz
- Luciana Ohira
- Renata La Rocca
- Sérgio Bonilha

Among the participants that had collaborated in different moments are:

- André Kishimoto
- Camila Torrano
- Clarissa Ribeiro
- Daniel Ferreira
- Fabio Oliveira Nunes
- Fernando Iazzetta
- Gaspar Arguello
- Lívia Gabbai
- Lucila Meirelles
- Luiz Bueno Geraldo
- Mauricio Taveira
- Paula Gabbai
- Raul Cecílio Jr.
- Soraya Braz
- Tatiana Travisani
- André Furlan
- Elaine de Oliveira Nunes
- Francisco Serpa
- Jesus de Paula Assis
- José Dario Vargas
- Karina Yamamoto
- Luciana Kawasaki
- Helia Vannuchi
- Luciano Gosuen
- Luis Henrique Moraes
- Marcos Cuzziol
- Mônica Ranciaro
- Monica Tavares
- Natália Gagliardi
- Paula Janovitch
- Rafael Rodrigues de Souza
- Ricardo Irineu de Souza
- Rodolfo Leão
- Silvia Laurentiz
- Silvio Valinhos da Silva
- Tânia Fraga
- Val Sampaio
- Viviam Schmaichel
