= Catholic University of Pernambuco =

University in Brazil

Coordinates: 8.0549°S 34.8878°W

- Universidade Católica de Pernambuco
- Coat of arms of the university
- Other names: Unicap
- Motto: Veritati et vitae
- Motto in English: Truth and Life
- Type: Private, non-profit
- Established: March 31, 1943; 83 years ago
- Affiliations: Roman Catholic, Jesuit
- Chancellor: Dom Pedro Rubens Ferreira Oliveira
- Rector: Aline Maria Grego
- Vice rector: Luciano José Pinheiro Barros
- Academic staff: 249
- Students: 15,000
- Undergraduates: 14,309
- Postgraduates: 691
- Location: Recife, Pernambuco, Brazil
- Campus: Urban
- Colors: Grey and white
- Website: www.unicap.br

The Catholic University of Pernambuco (Portuguese: Universidade Católica de Pernambuco, Unicap) in Recife, Pernambuco, Brazil, is a Catholic University, private and non-profit, run by the Society of Jesus. It is considered one of the best universities in Brazil, and the best private one in the north and northeast of Brazil.

== History ==
Unicap was founded on September 27, 1951.. In its development, the university faced incorporation and aggregation or creation of Colleges, Institutes, or Schools, to implement in 1974 the university reform law, adopting the model homogeneous ternary Rectory, Centres, and Departments. Unicap today includes an educational complex with 15,000 students from first-degree courses to graduate school. Some 50,000 have graduated.

The Central Library, named for Aloísio M. de Carvalho, SJ, has 15,000 registered users, 400,000 visits per year, and more than 700,000 loans, with on average of 3,500 readers per day. Its 450,000 volumes are indexed on internet. It is the biggest library of a university in the north and northeast region of Brazil.

== Programs ==
In 2010, in its first evaluation by the Ministry of Education, Unicap received a four out of five. Singled out for commendation were "The policy for teaching undergraduate and postgraduate, research, extension," the policy of incentives for graduates (with the payment of grants and agreements for internships), the approval of the trained law course in the examination of the Bar Association of Brazil (more than 60%), 33 Unicap research groups registered with the National Council for Scientific and Technological Development (CNPq), and the program of scholarships for teachers and employees.

Unicap's Student Exchange Program offers one or two semesters in an IES exchange program at the national or international level. This is encouraged by the Association of Universities entrusted to the Society of Jesus in Latin America (AUSJAL), for a beneficial integration of students from Latin American Jesuit higher education institutions. Unicap also receives foreign IES students in exchange.

== Courses ==
Professions
Course	Campus
Law	Boa Vista
Philosophy	Boa Vista
History	Boa Vista
Geography	Boa Vista
Pedagogy	Boa Vista
Social service	Boa Vista
Theology	Boa Vista
Social communication	Boa Vista
Letters	Boa Vista
Executive secretary	Boa Vista
Occupational therapy	Boa Vista
Chemical engineering	Boa Vista
Business administration	Boa Vista
Biological sciences	Boa Vista
Accounting	Boa Vista
Economics	Boa Vista
Physical education	Boa Vista
Speech therapy	Boa Vista
Civil engineering	Boa Vista
Environmental engineering	Boa Vista
Physiotherapy	Boa Vista
Mathematics	Boa Vista
Computers	Boa Vista
Tourism	Boa Vista
Architecture	Boa Vista
Computer Science	Boa Vista
Medicine	Boa Vista

== See also ==
- List of Jesuit sites
