= School of Communications and Arts, University of São Paulo =

Coordinates: 23°33′30″S 46°43′37″W

- Escola de Comunicações e Artes, Universidade de São Paulo
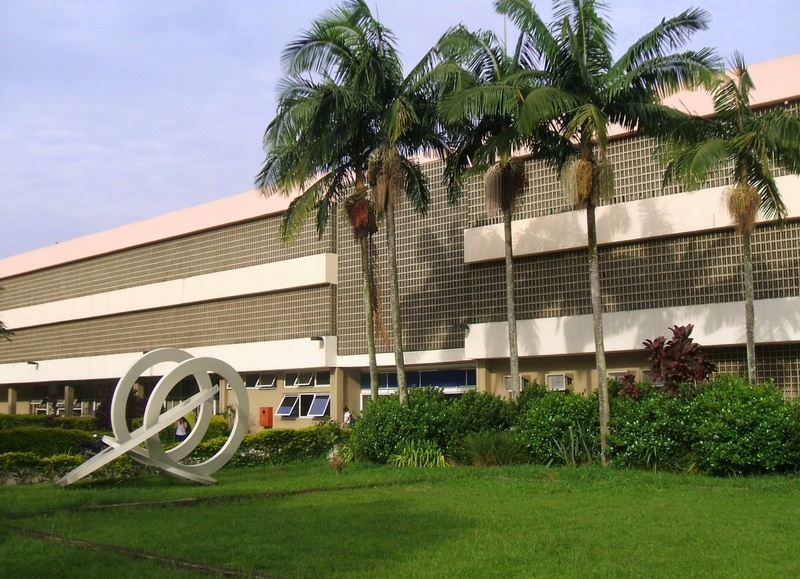
- Main building of the University of São Paulo School of Communications and Arts
- Type: Public
- Established: June 15, 1966
- Location: São Paulo, São Paulo State, Brazil
- Website: eca.usp.br

The School of Communications and Arts (Portuguese: Escola de Comunicações e Artes) at the University of São Paulo is an institution of higher education and research in the field of Arts and Communication located in São Paulo, Brazil. It was established on June 15, 1966 as School of Cultural Communication.

== Majors ==
University of São Paulo's undergraduate courses are spread over 36 Schools, each school with its own departments. Students that choose majors in communication and arts will have the great majority of classes in the School of Communications and Arts - although they may take subjects in different schools. ECA offers majors in all the following areas:

- Dramatic Arts
- Plastic Arts
- Audiovisual Arts
- Library Sciences
- Editorial Business
- Journalism
- Music
- Marketing, Advertisement and Publicity
- Public Relations
- Tourism

In total, University of São Paulo School of Communications and Arts has 22 undergraduate courses, from which 15 are devoted to Arts: Scenic Design, Theater Direction, Theater Acting, Theory of Theater, Sculpture, Engraving, Multimedia, Inter-media, Painting, Chant and Lyrical Art, Musical composition, Musical Instruments, Conducting and graduation in Art Education, Acting Performances, Fine Arts and Music; five are devoted for Social Communication, there are four options: Journalism, Publishing, Advertising and Public Relations; besides the courses of Librarianship, Tourism and Audio-visual.

Furthermore, ECA operates the School of Drama (EAD), a traditional school of theater known for its "Actor Performance" course.

== Departments ==
- Department of Acting Performances – CAC
- Department of Fine Arts – CAP
- Department of Librarianship and Documentation – CBD
- Department of Communication and Arts – CCA
- Department of Journalism and Publishing – CJE
- Department of Music – CMU
- Department of Public Relations, Advertising and Propaganda and Tourism – CRP
- Department of Cinema, Radio and Television – CTR
- School of Drama – EAD (technical school)

== Reputation ==
The school is currently ranked in the 46th position worldwide for the communication subject according to QS University Rankings - information from the 2014 ranking.

== Student organizations ==
=== CALC ===
CALC (Centro Academico Lupe Cotrim) is the Student Union responsible for representing the school's students in the university system.

=== Ecatletica ===
Organization responsible for providing training in a variety of sports for ECA students. It was created in 1971 within the Student Union, but in 1990 it became an independent organization.

=== ECA Junior ===
ECA Junior is an advertising company ran by students of the Department of Public Relations, Advertising, Propaganda and Tourism. It was created in the 1990s by students in the major of Social Communication Advertising and Publicity. The organization is supported by major Brazilian companies like Petrobras and it aims at providing advertising services to small companies unable to afford the high cost of traditional advertising.

== See also ==
- Renata Pallottini
- Lupe Cotrim
- Grupo Poéticas Digitais
