= Renata Pallottini =

Brazilian dramatist and playwright (1931–2021)

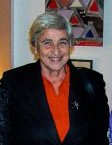
- Renata Pallottini in 2014
- Born: 20 January 1931; State of São Paulo, Brazil
- Died: August 7, 2021 (aged 90)
- Education: Pontifical Catholic University of São Paulo; Law School, University of São Paulo; University of São Paulo; Complutense University of Madrid
- Occupations: Playwright, Essayist, Poet, University Teacher and Translator
- Employer: University of São Paulo
- Awards: São Paulo Association of Art Critics Award (1976); Tortoise Prize - Poetry; Juca Pato Award (2017)

Renata Pallottini or Renata Monachesi Pallottini (January 20, 1931, in São Paulo – July 8, 2021, in São Paulo) was a Brazilian playwright, essayist, poet, theater professor and translator. She was an award-winning author of poetry, plays, essays, fiction, children's literature, theater theory, and television programs who was notable in the Brazilian literary and theater scenes. In a considerable part of her production, it is possible to identify the questioning and the combat against the social values that delimitated the woman's role in society.

Renata Pallottini established her name in the history of Brazilian theater as the first woman to attend the Dramaturgy course at the School of Dramatic Arts at the University of São Paulo and the first to write for the theater in the 1960s in São Paulo. With an innovative performance, she brought a textual proposal different from what was being done in São Paulo in the theatrical field, which culminated in her identification as a member of the new dramaturgy, a group formed by playwrights who were new to the city of São Paulo and who, in the 1960s and 1970s, promoted transformations in the theater. She was the author of the first Brazilian theater production - A Lâmpada (1960) - that dealt with the theme of homosexuality.

With an intense production, Renata transited through the Arts and Literature with mastery and creativity, having her work marked by a certain performativity, a trait that comes from her relationship with theater. In addition, she also held political and administrative positions in the theatrical sphere. Pallottini died at the age of 90, as a result of multiple myeloma.

== Education ==
In 1951, she graduated in pure Philosophy at the Pontifical Catholic University of São Paulo (PUC-SP) and, in 1953, she completed her bachelor's degree at the Law School of the University of São Paulo (FDUSP).

Renata received a scholarship from the Spanish government and entered the University of Madrid to study Spanish Culture, between 1959 and 1960. During this period she also attended the History of Spanish Art and Literature course at the Institute of Hispanic Culture (ICH).

Back to Brazil, between 1961 and 1962, she studied Dramaturgy and criticism at the School of Dramatic Art (EAD) at the University of São Paulo (USP), having among her teachers Anatol Rosenfeld, Décio de Almeida Prado, Augusto Boal and Alfredo Mesquita.

She finished her doctorate in 1982 at the School of Communications and Arts (ECA) at the University of São Paulo (USP), under the guidance of Sábato Magaldi. Her thesis deals with dramaturgy and also includes O País do Sol, an original play that Pallotini wrote for the theater and that would become the first work of her trilogy about Italian immigration in Brazil, together with Colônia Cecília and Tarantella plays. The theoretical part of her thesis resulted in the book Introdução à dramaturgia.

== Trajectory ==
Invited by Sábato Magaldi to replace him in 1964, Renata Pallotini started to work as a teacher at School of Dramatic Art (EAD), teaching the History of the Brazilian Theatre. In her teaching career, she has taught at EAD and also at the Department of Performing Arts (CAC) of the School of Communications and Arts, contributing to the training of several generations of actors and researchers in the area of theater. In 2012, she received the title of professor emeritus from the same institution. She has given courses and lectures in institutions in several countries such as Cuba, Italy, Spain, Portugal and Peru.

She was an award-winning author who wrote poetry, essays, fiction, theater theory, children's literature, and television programs, as well as several translations. In many of her works, it is possible to identify a questioning and combative position towards the values that demarcated the role of women in society.

She wrote for the theater since the early 1960s, being A Lâmpada (1961), Sarapalha (1962) and O Crime da Cabra (1965) her first works, having developed intense theatrical activity throughout the 1970s and 1980s. Her works were produced by important directors such as Silnei Siqueira, Ademar Guerra, José Rubens Siqueira, Marcia Abujamra, Gabriel Vilela, among others. She has also adapted and translated literary works for the theater, among them O Escorpião de Numância (1968) based on Miguel de Cervantes' Cerco de Numancia; translated the musical Hair, by James Rado and Gerome Ragni; translated and adapted the novel Cidades Invisíveis, by Italo Calvino. The multiplicity of themes and landscapes is one of the characteristics of her work as a playwright. Luís Alberto de Abreu and Jacó Guinsburg argue that she:

Blossomed in the great Sao Paulo generation of the 1960s that brought renewal to the contemporary scene, inserted theater as the vanguard in the broad political and cultural movement that characterized the period and decisively marked later generations.

For television, Renata Pallottini has worked as a script writer for soap operas and series. Despite her intense activity in theater, TV and as a teacher, it was in poetry that Renata Pallottini found her richest and most fertile ground. As a writer, she published her first texts in the 1950s, in the student newspapers of the Law School (USP). In this period she also published her first book of poems, Acalanto (1952), printed at Pallottini's family printing house. Her first novel, Mate é a cor da vivez, was published in 1975 and, according to Lygia Fagundes Telles, is "a beautiful and courageous book". A decade later, she published her first children's book, Tita, a Poeta.

Renata also held political and administrative positions. She was president of the State Commission of Theater of the Secretariat of Culture (CET), succeeding Cacilda Becker (1969–1970), founder and first president of the São Paulo Association of Theatrical Authors (APART), and president of the Brazilian Center of Theater, affiliated to the International Theatre Institute (ITI/UNESCO). Pallottini was also part of entities linked to the literary class such as the Brazilian Union of Writers, the PENclub of Brazil and the Poetry Club of São Paulo and, as of 2013, she joined the Academy of Literature of São Paulo, occupying the 20th chair.

As a Corinthians fan, Renata has dedicated some of her works to the sports club of her heart, including Melodrama, O Dia em que o Corinthians foi Campeão, Onze contra Onze and O Corinthiano.

Renata Pallottini died on July 8, 2021, at Santa Catarina Hospital, in São Paulo, at the age of 90, of multiple myeloma.

== Female dramaturgy ==
Renata Pallottini is an important name in the history of contemporary Brazilian female dramaturgy, as she was the first woman to attend the Dramaturgy course at EAD/USP and the first to write for theater in São Paulo in the 1960s. She is among the playwrights who project themselves around 1969, being part of the group that formed the new generation of women theater writers along with Hilda Hilst, Leilah Assumpção, Consuelo de Castro, Isabel Câmara. Elza Cunha de Vicenzo, in her book Um Teatro da Mulher (1992), affirms that after 1969, in Brazil, women playwrights began to reveal themselves in significant numbers, making up a larger group of first time playwrights that came to be known as the group of the new dramaturgy, which can be characterized by presenting a type of text and textual proposal diverse - in various aspects - from what had been done in the theater in São Paulo.

From an aesthetic and ideological point of view, their writings brought renewal to the contemporary scene. A Lâmpada (1960), for example, deals with a theme that would only be broached later in Brazilian theater: homosexuality, a pioneering play.

== Censorship ==
She lived through the Military dictatorship period in Brazil, which had an impact on her career, her productions, and on the repercussion of her work with the public. In 1964, the project O Crime da Cabra, by the National Theater Service, directed by Ademar Guerra, touring all over the country, was undone by impositions resulting from the military coup. The play would be staged the following year, however, without the initial proposal of touring through different Brazilian states and, even though it won important prizes, it did not have the public repercussion that it could have, had it been staged as initially planned, in an itinerant way.

The play Enquanto se Vai Morrer, a genre of epic drama with the theme of the death penalty and torture, written in 1972, was vetoed by the military regime for "violating current legislation. It remained unpublished until 2002, when it was mounted by Zecarlos de Andrade on the steps of the Law School in São Francisco Square.

Renata says that:

The damage that censorship did to Brazilian theater is irrecoverable. A vetoed play is never the same, even if it is staged afterwards. Not to mention that the damage is not only to the plays, but to the authors as well.

As a lesbian woman who lived through the military dictatorship, she didn't want to hide, she wrote between the lines what she felt, and in this way she could express her sexual identity without being disturbed by conservatism.

== Works ==
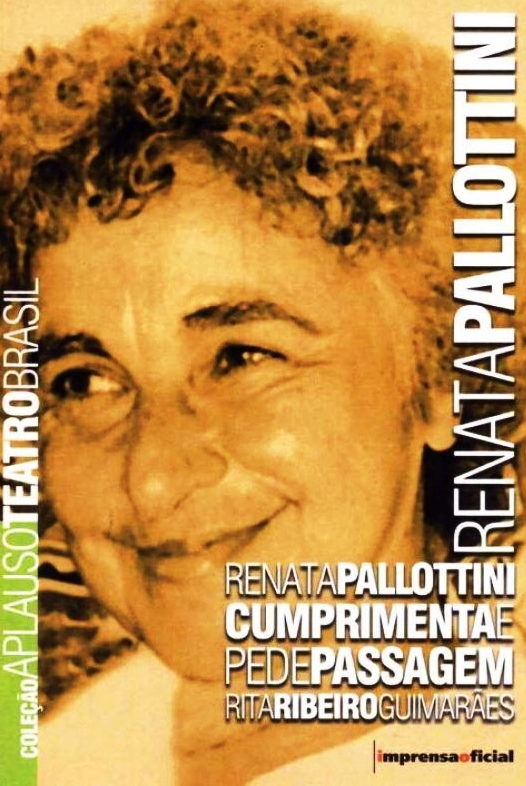
Cover of the book Renata Pallottini cumprimenta e pede passagem (Aplauso Teatro Brasil Collection)

Renata Pallottini's production includes plays, books of poems, novels, children's literature, and studies in dramaturgy. In addition, some of her works have been adapted for television and published in other countries. The Itaú Cultural Encyclopedia says that:

Renata Pallottini has her production in the theater, in television, as a writer, as a teacher, and in the administrative and political areas. All the languages in which she works carry the unmistakable mark of the poetic, which characterizes and differentiates her as a creator.

=== Theatrical plays ===
In theater, she has numerous plays mounted. Some are listed below, together with the year of the production:

- 2022: Enquanto se vai morrer - Directed by Zécarlos de Andrade.
- 1984: Colônia Cecília - Directed by Ademar Guerra.
- 1982: Melodrama - Directed by Anamaria.
- 1976: Serenata Cantada aos Companheiros - Directed by Fausto Fuser
- 1971: A História do Juiz - Directed by Eloy Araújo.
- 1969: Os Sete Pecados Capitais: Luxúria, Gula, Preguiça, Inveja, Ira, Soberba, Avareza - In partnership with Eudinyr Fraga, Moysés Baunstein, Myriam de San Juan, Lúcia Godoy, Aroldo Macedo; all authors graduated from EAD's dramaturgy course.
- 1969: Pedro Pedreiro - Directed by Silnei Siqueira and with music by Chico Buarque, it was EAD's first show to tour abroad, participating in the Manizales University Theater Festival (Colombia).
- 1965: O Crime da Cabra - Directed by Carlos Murtinho with a production by Nydia Licia Company.
- 1964: Nu para Vinícius - In partnership with Lauro César Muniz; it was staged at the Teatro Brasileiro de Comédia (TBC)
- 1962: O Exercício da Justiça - Directed by Renata Pallottini; staged at School of Dramatic Art - EAD.
- 1960: A Lâmpada - Directed by Tereza Aguiar.

=== Translations and adaptations for the theater ===
- 2001: Cidades Invisíveis - Directed by Márcia Abujamra.
- 1986: Caminhos que fazem o Darro e o Genil Até o Mar - Directed by Tereza Aguiar.
- 1986: Topografia de um Desnudo - Directed by Tereza Aguiar.
- 1985: Ah!Mérica - Directed by Davias Petti.
- 1985: O Camaleão - Directed by Reinaldo Santiago;
- 1984: Simón - Directed by Franscisco Medeiros.
- 1980: Divinas Palavras - Directed by Iacox Hillel.
- 1978: A Vida é um Sonho - Directed by Celso Nunes.
- 1974: Lulu, a Caixa de Pandora - Directed by Ademar Guerra.
- 1973: Godspell - Directed by Altair Lima.
- 1972: João Guimarães, Veredas - Directed by Tereza Aguiar.
- 1970: O Escorpião de Numância - Directed by José Rubens Siqueira, with Cláudio Corrêa e Castro in the main role.
- 1970: Tom Paine, by Paul Foster.
- 1969: Hair - Directed by Ademar Guerra.
- 1969: Sarapalha - Directed by Alberto D'Aversa.

=== Works for television ===
- 2009: João Miguel (series)
- 1984: Joana (series)
- 1982: Nem Rebeldes, Nem Fiéis (telenovela)
- 1981: Os Imigrantes (telenovela)
- 1979: Malu Mulher (series)
- 1979: Carga Pesada (series)
- 1976: O Julgamento (telenovela)
- 1976: Sapicuá (episode of the series Special Case)
- 1974: Tempo de Nascer
- 1972: Vila Sésamo (child's series)
- 1961: Tensão
- 1961: O Crime da Cabra

=== Poetries ===
With more than 20 books published, Renata dedicated herself to literature, producing poetry, prose, and dramaturgy. Given her relationship with theater, she wrote poetry in a performative way. Poet Carlos Drummond de Andrade said that Renata's poetry "is one of the most vibrant achievements in the field of lyricism turned to real and immediate life, life not painted with dreams."

Renata Pallottini's poems are featured in the book Poesia Gay Brasileira (2017), the first anthology that brings together LGBT+-themed poems produced by Brazilian male and female writers.

- 2016: Poesia não Vende (Hucitec)
- 2008: Chocolate Amargo (Brasiliense)
- 2002: Um Calafrio Diário (Perspectiva)
- 1997: Anja (Quinteto)
- 1995: Obra Poética (Hucitec)
- 1988: Praça Maior (Rk Publisher)
- 1985: Esse Vinho Vadio (Massao Ohno)
- 1985: Ao Inventor das Aves (J. R. Scortecci)
- 1982: Cerejas, meu amor (Massao Ohno)
- 1980: Cantar meu Povo (Massao Ohno)
- 1978: Noite Afora (Brasiliense)
- 1977: Chão de Palavras (Círculo do Livro)
- 1976: Coração Americano (Meta Publisher)
- 1971: Os Arcos da Memória (Escritor Publisher)
- 1968: Antologia Poética (Leitura Publisher)
- 1965: A Faca e a Pedra (Brasil Publisher)
- 1961: Livro de Sonetos (Massao Ohno)
- 1958: A Casa e outros Poemas (Clube de Poesia)
- 1957: Nós, Portugal (Author's edition)
- 1956: O Monólogo Vivo (Author's edition)
- 1953: O Cais da Serenidade (Elviro Pocal's edition)
- 1952: Acalanto (Author's edition)

=== Novels ===
- 2015: Eu Fui Soldado de Fidel (Hucitec)
- 2011: Chez Mme. Maigret (Global)
- 1998: Ofícios & Amargura (Scipione)
- 1991: Nosotros (Brasiliente)
- 1975: Mate é a Cor da Viuvez (Author's edition)

=== Children's literature ===
- 2004: As Três Rainhas Magas (Brasiliense)
- 1998: Sempre é Tempo (Moderna)
- 1993: Do Tamanho do Mundo (Moderna)
- 1988: Café com Leite (FTD)
- 1987: A Menina que Queria Ser Anja (Moderna)
- 1985: O Mistério do Esqueleto (Moderna)
- 1984: Tita, a Poeta (Moderna)

=== Non-fiction - theoretical studies ===
- 2006: Teatro Completo (Perspectiva).
- 1998: Dramaturgia de Televisão (Moderna).
- 1998: Anthologie de la Poésie Brésilienne (Paris: Editions Chandeigne) - Coordenation.
- 1997: Cacilda Becker: o Teatro e suas Chamas (Arte & Ciência).
- 1989: Dramaturgia: a Construção da Personagem (Ática).
- 1983: Introdução à Dramaturgia. (Brasiliense).

== Awards ==
Throughout her career, Renata has received important awards, such as the Juca Pato Award, in 2017, an honor from the Brazilian Writer's Union for her entire career and specifically for her book of poems, Poesia não vende. She also received the Jabuti Award, in the poetry category for Obra Poética, in 1996 and the PENclub of Poetry for the work Livro de Sonetos, in 1961. In 2016, she was awarded the Guilherme de Almeida Necklace, granted by the São Paulo City Council to people who collaborate with culture.

Among the awards she received are:

- 1976: São Paulo Association of Art Critics Award - Best Screenplay - for the telenovela O Julgamento.
- 1974: São Paulo Association of Art Critics Award - Best Translation - for the work in Lulu.
- 1968: Anchieta Award from the State Theater Commission (CET) for best theater text - for the work O Escorpião de Numância.
- 1965: Molière Award - for the play O crime da Cabra.
- 1965: State Governor Award - for the play O Crime da Cabra.
- 1956: Adaptation Prize - for the play Sarapalha by the Teatro de Arena

== Bibliography ==
- BEZERRA, Kátia da Costa (2000). "Renata Pallottini: uma poética em luta contra espaços asfixiantes". Revista Letras. 53.
- PALLOTTINI, Renata (1995). "Foi assim (ou, de como escrevi meu último livro)". Comunicação & Educação (2): 102–105. doi:10.11606/issn.2316-9125.v0i2p102-105.
- Projeto Memórias da ECA/USP: 50 anos. (2014). "Videoentrevistas de Renata Pallottini".
