= José Arthur Giannotti =

Brazilian philosopher and university professor (1930–2021)

José Arthur Giannotti (25 February 1930 – 27 July 2021) was a Brazilian philosopher, essayist, and university professor.

He was a full and emeritus professor at the Faculty of Philosophy, Letters, and Human Sciences at the University of São Paulo.

== Books ==
- John Stuart Mill: o psicologismo e a fundamentação lógica. São Paulo: USP, 1964.
- Origens da dialética do trabalho. 2ª ed. Porto Alegre: L&PM, 1966.
- Exercícios de filosofia. 2ª ed. São Paulo: Brasiliense, 1977.
- Trabalho e reflexão. São Paulo: Brasiliense, 1983.
- Universidade em ritmo de barbárie. São Paulo: Brasiliense, 1986.
- Apresentação do mundo: Considerações sobre o pensamento de Ludwig Wittgenstein. São Paulo: Cia. das Letras, 1995.
- Certa herança marxista. São Paulo: Companhia das Letras, 2000.
- Marx vida & obra. Porto Alegre: L&PM Editores, 2000.
- O jogo do belo e do feio. São Paulo: Companhia das Letras, 2005.
- Notícias no Espelho. São Paulo: Publifolha, 2011.
- Lições de Filosofia Primeira. São Paulo: Companhia das Letras, 2011.
- O capital: crítica da economia politica. Livro I. 2ª ed. São Paulo: Boitempo Editorial, 2013.
- A política no limite do pensar. São Paulo: Companhia das Letras, 2014. (eBook)
- Os limites da política: Uma divergência. São Paulo: Cia das Letras, 2017. (Em coautoria com Luiz Damon)
- Heidegger/Wittgenstein: Confrontos. São Paulo: Cia das Letras, 2020.
