= Julia da Costa =

Brazilian poet

Julia María da Costa (July 1, 1844, in Paranaguá – July 12, 1911, in São Francisco do Sul) was a Brazilian writer and poet. She is considered to be the premier poet of the Paraná region of Brazil.
