= Cecília Meireles =

Brazilian writer and educator

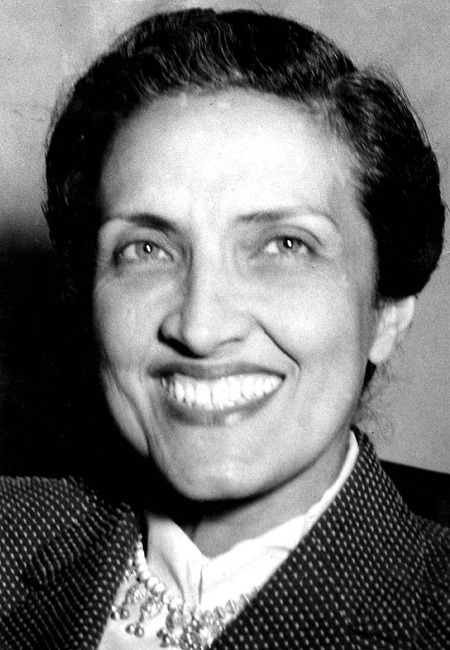
- Born: Cecília Benevides de Carvalho Meireles; 7 November 1901 Rio de Janeiro, Brazil
- Died: 9 November 1964 (aged 63) Rio de Janeiro, Brazil
- Literary movement: Modernism

Cecília Benevides de Carvalho Meireles (7 November 1901 – 9 November 1964) was a Brazilian writer and educator, known principally as a poet. She is a canonical name of Brazilian Modernism, one of the great female poets in the Portuguese language, and is widely considered the best female poet from Brazil, though she objected to the word poetess because of gender discrimination.

She traveled in the Americas in the 1940s, visiting the United States, Mexico, Argentina, Uruguay and Chile. In the summer of 1940, she gave lectures at the University of Texas, Austin. She wrote two poems about her time in the capital of Texas, and a long (800 lines) very socially aware poem "USA 1940", which was published posthumously. As a journalist her columns (crônicas, or chronicles) focused most often on education, but also on her trips abroad in the western hemisphere, Portugal, other parts of Europe, Israel, and India (where she received an honorary doctorate).

As a poet, her style was mostly neosymbolist and her themes included ephemeral time and the contemplative life. Even though she was not concerned with local color, native vernacular, or experiments in (popular) syntax, she is considered one of the most important poets of the second phase of the Brazilian Modernism, known for nationalistic vanguardism. As a teacher she did much to promote educational reforms and advocated the construction of children's libraries. Between 1935 and 1938, she taught at the short-lived federal-district university in Rio.

== Biography ==
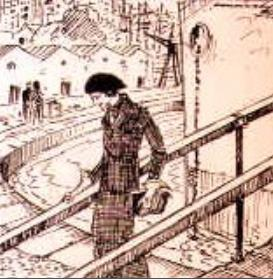
An ink drawing of Meireles disembarking in Lisbon, by her first husband, Fernando Correia Dias.

Meireles was "orphaned at age three and raised by her maternal grandmother" (Tapscott 160). As a poet, she made her debut at the age of eighteen, with Espectros (1919). It has been described as "an airy and vague poetry, languid and fluid, set in an atmosphere of shadows and dreams." The collection of seventeen sonnets dealt with various historical personages. Although her next collections included lyrics in free verse, she still preferred traditional forms and symbolism. Between 1919 and 1927, she contributed to the magazines Árvore Nova and Terra do Sol. She was a key figure in the spiritual and transcendental magazine Festa. The Festa poets supported more traditional expression and universality than the futurists and avant-garde writers of São Paulo, whose Modern Art Week in 1922 caused much controversy. Meireles always retained symbolist traits. Especially Portuguese poetry interested her. She visited Portugal in 1934 and lectured there on Brazilian literature at the universities of Lisbon and Coimbra.

After 14 years without publishing a book of poetry, Meireles published one of her major works, Viagem [Voyage] (1939), which marked her poetic maturity. The book had received the annual Poetry Prize from the Brazilian Academy of Letters in 1938. The title refers to a spiritual journey where life and poetry join together. Meireles was a devout Catholic, but did not emphasize her religious or social stands. In the 1940s Meireles traveled widely and the sea became for her an important image. Mar Absoluto (1942) was sea poetry with the qualities of so-called pure poetry. In 1953 she participated in a symposium on the work of Gandhi, and India had a great influence on her work. She had taught herself both Hindi and Sanskrit. Romanceiro da Inconfidência (1953) was written in the style of medieval Iberian ballads. The work draws its subject from the first colonial attempt at Brazilian Independence, in Minas Gerais in 1789, and centers on the leader of the uprising, Joaquim José da Silva Xavier, who was hailed as another Jesus Christ. Giroflê, Giroflá (1956) was based on the author's journeys to India and Italy.

Meireles was a prolific contributor to Brazilian periodicals, and for a time she served as education editor of Rio's Diario de Noticías. She translated into Portuguese such diverse writers as Maeterlinck, Federico García Lorca, Anouilh, Ibsen, Tagore, Rilke, Virginia Woolf, and Pushkin. Her other works include plays and children's books. Cecília Meireles died of cancer in Rio de Janeiro on 9 November 1964, two days after her 63rd birthday. During her career Meireles was affected by many of the literary movements of her time. However, her poetry always remained intensely personal.

In October 2009 she was one of the three featured authors at the Primeiro Congresso de Escritoras Brasileiras em Nova Iorque (First Congress of Brazilian Women Writers in New York) at the Centro Cultural Brasil / Brazilian Endowment for the Arts in Midtown Manhattan.

== Sources ==
- Karen Peña, Poetry and the Realm of the Public Intellectual: The Alternative Destinies of Gabriela Mistral, Cecilia Meireles, and Rosario Castellanos (2008);
- Darlene Sadlier, Imagery and Theme in the Poetry of Cecília Meireles (1983);
- John Nist, The Modernist Movement in Brazil (Austin: University of Texas Press, 1967).
- Raymond Sayers, "The Poetic Universe of Cecilia Meireles." In Romance Studies Offered to Francis Rogers (1981)
- Marta Peixoto, "The Absent Body: Female Signature and Poetic Convention in Cecilia Meireles." Bulletin of Hispanic Studies 65.1 (1988).
- Stephen Tapscott (Ed.), "Twentieth century Latin American poetry: A bilingual anthology" (160). (Austin: University of Texas Press, 1996).
