= Manuel Bandeira =

Brazilian poet, literary critic, and translator (1886–1968)

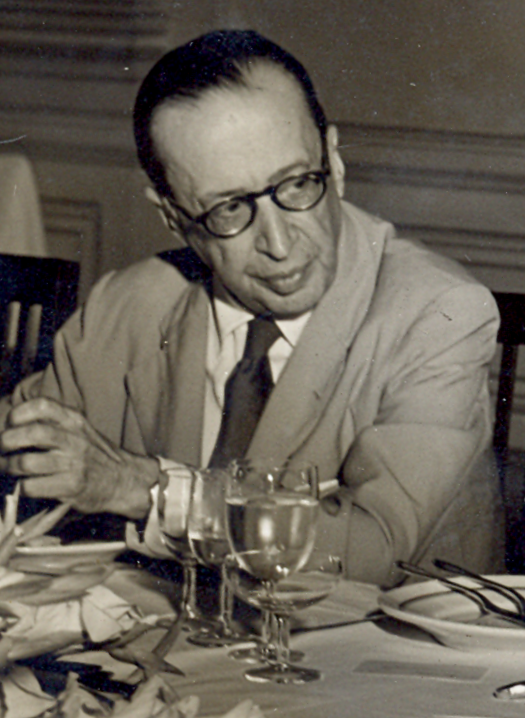
- Born: Manuel Carneiro de Sousa Bandeira Filho; April 19, 1886; Recife, Pernambuco, Empire of Brazil
- Died: October 13, 1968 (aged 82); Rio de Janeiro, Brazil
- Occupation: Poet
- Writing career
- Movement: Modernism

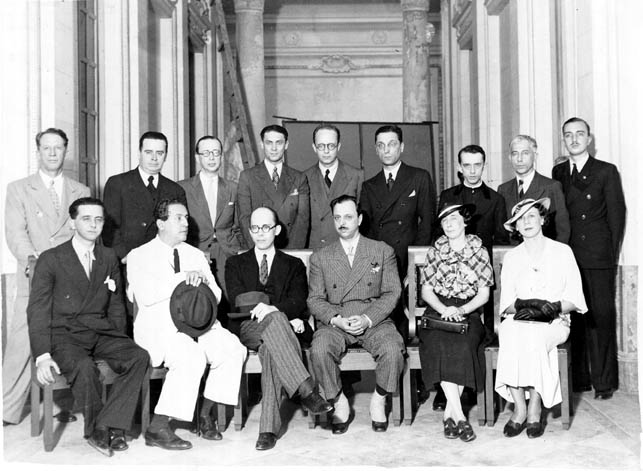
Manuel Bandeira (the 3rd left to right, back row), 1936

Manuel Carneiro de Sousa Bandeira Filho (April 19, 1886 – October 13, 1968) was a Brazilian poet, literary critic, and translator, who wrote over 20 books of poetry and prose.

== Life and career ==
Bandeira was born in Recife, Pernambuco. In 1904, he found out that he suffered from tuberculosis, which encouraged him to move from São Paulo to Rio de Janeiro, because of Rio's tropical beach weather. In 1922, after an extended stay in Europe where Bandeira met many prominent authors and painters, he contributed poems of political and social criticism to the Modernist movement in São Paulo. Bandeira began to publish his most important works in 1924. He became a respected Brazilian author and wrote for several newspapers and magazines. He also taught Hispanic Literature in Rio de Janeiro. Bandeira began to translate into Portuguese canonical plays of world literature in 1956, something he continued to do until his last days. He died in Rio de Janeiro.

Bandeira's poems have a unique delicacy and beauty. Recurrent themes that can be found in his works are: the love of women, his childhood in the Northeast city of Recife, friends, and health problems. His delicate health affected his poetry, and many of his poems depict the limits of the human body.

He is one of Brazil's most admired and inspiring poets until today. In fact, the "bandeiriano rhythm" deserves in-depth studies of essayists. Manuel Bandeira has a simple and direct style, but does not share the hardness of poets like João Cabral de Melo Neto, also a Pernambucano. Indeed, in an analysis of the works of Manuel Bandeira and João Cabral de Melo Neto, one sees that, unlike the latter, who aims to purge the lyricism of his work, Bandeira was the most lyrical of poets. His work addresses universal themes and everyday concerns, sometimes with an approach of "poem-a-joke", dealing with forms and inspiration that academic tradition considers vulgar.

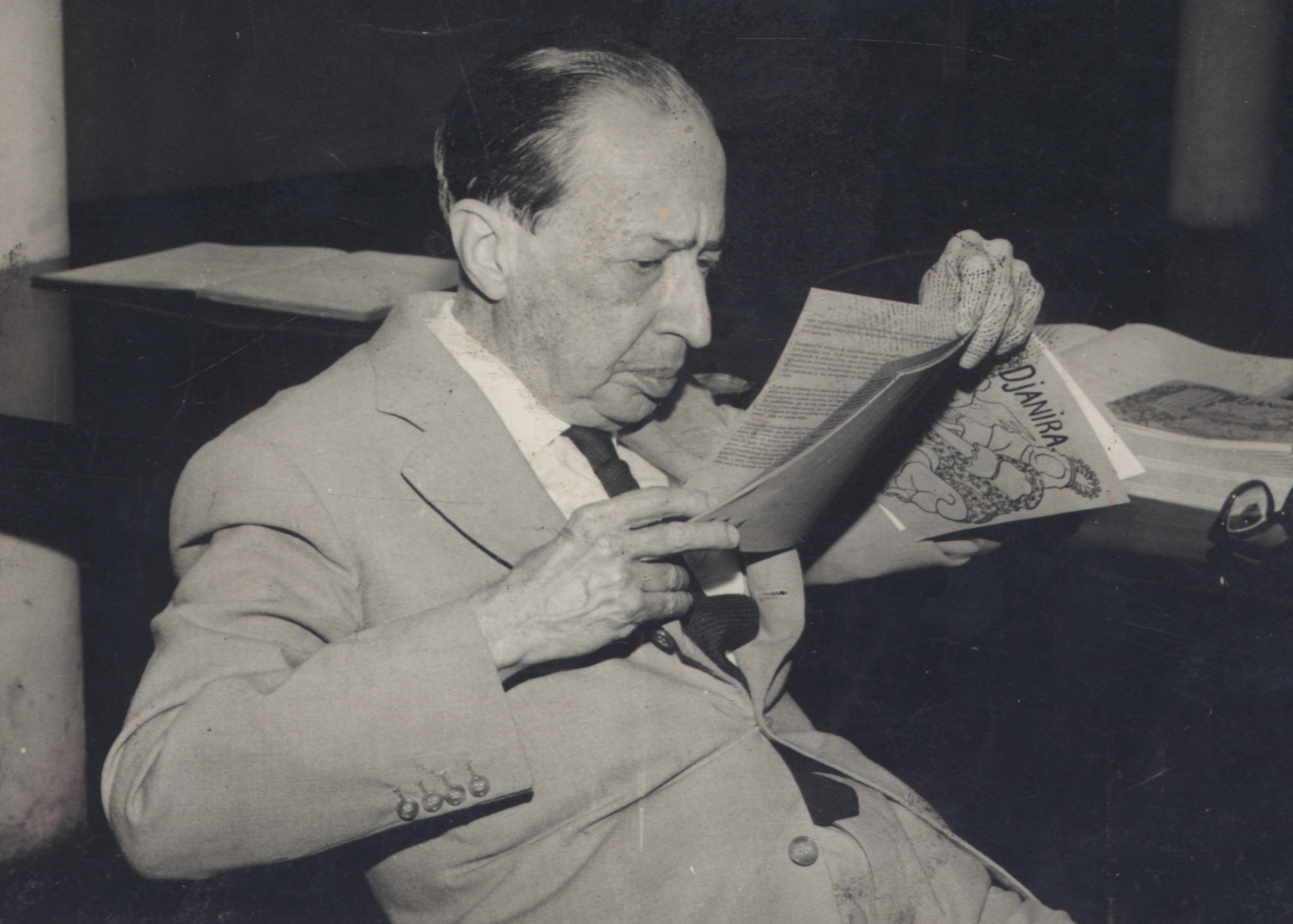
Manuel Bandeira, 1966. National Archives of Brazil.

In addition, his vast knowledge of literature was used to speak about everyday topics, sometimes using forms taken from classical and medieval traditions. In his debut work, there are rigid poetic compositions, rich rhymes and sonnets in perfect measure. In his later work we find as the rondo compositions and ballads. His poetry, far from being a little sweet song of melancholy, is deeply concerned with a drama combining his personal history and conflicts stylistic lived by the poets of his time. Cinza das Horas—Ash from the Hours presents a great view: the hurt, the sadness, resentment, framed by the morbid style of late symbolism.

Carnaval, a book that came soon after Cinza das Horas opens with the unpredictable: the evocation of the Bacchic and satanic carnival, but it ends in the middle of melancholy. This hesitation between jubilation and joint pain will be figurative in several dimensions. Instead, happiness appears in poems like "Vou-me Embora para Pasárgada" [I'm off to Pasargadae]," where the question is dreamy evocation of an imaginary country, the Pays de Cocagne, where every desire, especially erotic, is satisfied. Passargada is not elsewhere, but an intangible place, a locus of spiritual amenus. In Bandeira, the object of desire is veiled. Adopting the trope of the Portuguese saudade, Pasargada and many other poems are similar in a nostalgic remembrance of Bandeira's childhood, street life, as well as the everyday world of provincial Brazilian cities of the early 20th century.

The intangible is also feminine and erotic. Torn between a sheer idealism of friendly and platonic unions and a voluptuous carnality, Manuel Bandeira is, in many of his poems, a poet of guilt. The pleasure is not accomplished by the satisfaction of desire, but it is the excitement of loss that satisfies the desire. In O Ritmo Dissoluto [Dissolute Rhythm], eroticism, so morbid in the first two books, is longing, it is the dissolution of a liquid element, as it is the case of wet nights in Loneliness.

== Bibliography ==
A Literature professor, he was elected to the Brazilian Academy of Letters where he was the third occupant of the 24th Chair whose patron was Júlio Ribeiro. His election took place on August 29, 1940, succeeding Luís Guimarães and he was formally introduced by academician Ribeiro Couto on November 30, 1940.

== Personal Life ==
Manuel Bandeira was born to Manuel Carneiro de Sousa Bandeira and Francelina Ribero de Sousa Bandeira in Recife, Pernambuco, Brazil on April 19, 1886.

Bandeira wanted to be an architect, and moved to São Paulo to study engineering and architecture at the Escola Politécnica in 1903. However, his diagnosis of tuberculosis in 1904 caused him to shift paths, causing him to write poetry.

He died at the age of 82, on October 18, 1968, in Botafogo (a borough of Rio de Janeiro) caused by acute anemia due to a hemorrhage from a gastric ulcer. His funeral took place at the grand hall of the Brazilian Academy of Letters. He is now buried at the São João Batista Cemetery.

== Example ==
CONSOADA

Quando a Indesejada das gentes chegar
(Não sei se dura ou caroável),
Talvez eu tenha medo.
Talvez sorria, ou diga:
- Alô, iniludível!
O meu dia foi bom, pode a noite descer.
(A noite com seus sortilégios.)
Encontrará lavrado o campo, a casa limpa,
A mesa posta,
Com cada coisa em seu lugar.

Manuel Bandeira

Translation:

Special dinner (*)

When the undesirable of the people comes,
(I don't know if tough or gentle)
Maybe I will be scared.
Maybe I will smile, or say:
- Hello, uncheatable!
My day was good, the night can fall.
(The night with its maledictions.)
It will find the field plowed, the house cleaned,
the table ready,
With everything in its place.

(*) "Consoada" translated as "Special dinner" is the traditional Portuguese dinner in the night before Christmas Day.

== Poetry ==
- Alumbramentos, 1960
- Antologia Poética
- Berimbau e Outros Poemas, 1986
- Carnaval, 1919
- 50 Poemas Escolhidos pelo Autor, 1955
- A Cinza das Horas, 1917
- A Cinza das Horas, Carnaval e O Ritmo Dissoluto, 1994
- Estrela da Manhã, 1936
- Estrela da Tarde, 1959
- Estrela da Vida Inteira. Poesias Reunidas, 1966
- This Earth, That Sky: Poems (English translation of Estrela da vida inteira), 1989
- Libertinagem, 1930
- Libertinagem. Estrela da Manhã. Edição crítica, 1998
- Mafuá do Malungo. Jogos Onomásticos e Outros Versos de Circunstância 1948.
- O Melhor Soneto de Manuel Bandeira, 1955
- Os Melhores Poemas de Manuel Bandeira Selected and edited by Francisco de Assis Barbosa, 1984
- A Morte, 1965. (special edition)
- Opus 10, 1952
- Pasárgada, 1959
- Um Poema de Manuel Bandeira, 1956
- Poemas de Manuel Bandeira com Motivos Religiosos, 1985
- Poesia Selected by Alceu Amoroso Lima, 197
- Poesia e Prosa, 1958
- Poesias, 192
- Poesias Completas, 1940
- Poesias Escolhidas, 1937
- Seleta em Prosa e Verso Selected and edited by Emanuel de Morais, 1971
