= João Cabral de Melo Neto =

Brazilian poet and diplomat

- Born: João Cabral de Melo Neto; 6 January 1920; Recife, Brazil
- Died: 9 October 1999 (aged 79); Rio de Janeiro, Brazil
- Occupation: Writer
- Writing career
- Notable awards: Camões Prize; 1990; Neustadt International Prize for Literature; 1992

João Cabral de Melo Neto (January 6, 1920 – October 9, 1999) was a Brazilian poet and diplomat, and one of the most influential writers in late Brazilian modernism. He was awarded the 1990 Camões Prize and the 1992 Neustadt International Prize for Literature, the only Brazilian poet to receive such award to date. He was considered until his death a perennial competitor for the Nobel Prize in Literature.

Melo Neto's works are noted for the rigorous, yet inventive attention they pay to the formal aspects of poetry. He derives his characteristic sound from a traditional verse of five or seven syllables (called ‘’redondilha’’) and from the constant use of oblique rhymes. His style ranges from the surrealist tendency which marked his early poetry to the use of regional elements of his native northeastern Brazil. In many works, including the famed auto Morte e Vida Severina, Melo Neto's addresses the life of those affected by the poverty and inequality in Pernambuco.

== Life and career ==
Melo Neto was born in Recife, Pernambuco, and spent most of his youth in his family's sugar-cane mills in the interior of the state. He was a cousin of distinguished poet Manuel Bandeira and sociologist Gilberto Freyre. In 1940, his family moved to Rio de Janeiro.

Two years later, Melo Neto published his first book of poems, Pedra do Sono, at his own expense, with a circulation of 340 copies. In 1945, he applied to the post of diplomat, a position he would hold for most of his life. The following year, he married Stella Maria Barbosa de Oliveira, with whom he had five children.

After passing through several different countries, he became consul of Brazil in Porto in 1984, only returning to Rio de Janeiro three years later. He worked for many years in Spain, and his experiences in Seville would leave palpable influences in his poetry.

In 1956, Melo Neto published his most famous work, Morte e Vida Severina, and, in 1968, he was elected to the 37th chair of the Brazilian Academy of Letters.

In 1986, he married Marly de Oliveira and, two years later, he retired, resigning from his office as ambassador. Melo Neto died in 1999, in Rio de Janeiro. In a career spanning more than fifty years, Melo Neto published 18 books of poetry and two plays.

== Poetry ==
Poetry is not the product of inspiration triggered by feeling, but the product of the poet's patient and lucid work.

The image of an engineer designing a building, an epithet Melo Neto himself adopted, is often used to describe his poetry. From the start, his poetry was extraordinarily rich in imagery. Commenting Pedra do Sono, his first book, Antonio Candido, who noted his debt to cubism and surrealism, observed how his poems were composed from the accumulation of concrete and sensory images, using words in an almost pictorial manner.

Quickly, however, he proved highly attentive to the social reality of his state. In O cão sem plumas (“A Dog without Feathers”)’, his first long poem, dated from 1950, he portrayed the lives of the destitute classes, who depended on the Capibaribe River, and described the toiling of the sugar-cane mill. Three years later, in O Rio (“The River”) he assumed the voice of the river, narrating in first-person its course and the villages and landscapes it crossed.

Clarifying his debts to Melo Neto, Augusto de Campos has said: “One might say that he has no antecedents in Brazilian poetry, but his work has consequences. It is Concrete poetry that will sustain, continue, expand and broaden this poetic language that is not sentimental, but objective, a poetry of concretude, a critical poetry, as João's poetry is.”

== Works ==
=== Poetry ===
- 1942: Pedra do Sono (Slumber Stone)
- 1943: Os Três Mal-Amados (The Three Unloved)
- 1945: O Engenheiro (The Engineer)
- 1947: Psicologia da Composição com a Fábula de Anfion e Antiode (Psychology of Composition with the Fable of Amphion and Anti-Ode)
- 1950: O Cão sem Plumas (The Dog without Feathers)
- 1953: O Rio ou Relação da Viagem que Faz o Capibaribe de Sua Nascente à Cidade do Recife (The River or On the Course of the Capibaribe River from Its Source to the City of Recife)
- 1960: Dois Parlamentos (Two Parliaments)
- 1960: Quaderna
- 1966: A Educação pela Pedra (Education by the Stone)
- 1975: Museu de Tudo (Museum of Everything)
- 1980: A Escola das Facas (The School of the Knives)
- 1984: Auto do Frade (The Friar's Way)
- 1985: Agrestes
- 1987: Crime na Calle Relator (Crime in Relator Street)
- 1990: Primeiros Poemas (First Poems)
- 1990: Sevilha Andando (Walking around Seville)

=== Play ===
- 1955: Morte e Vida Severina (translated in part by Elizabeth Bishop as Life and Death of a Severino)

Academic offices
Preceded by Assis Chateaubriand	Occupant of the 37th chair of the Brazilian Academy of Letters; 1968–1999	Succeeded by Ivan Junqueira
