= Institute of Brazilian Studies at the University of São Paulo =

Specialized research unit of the University of São Paulo

Institute of Brazilian Studies
- Instituto de Estudos Brasileiros
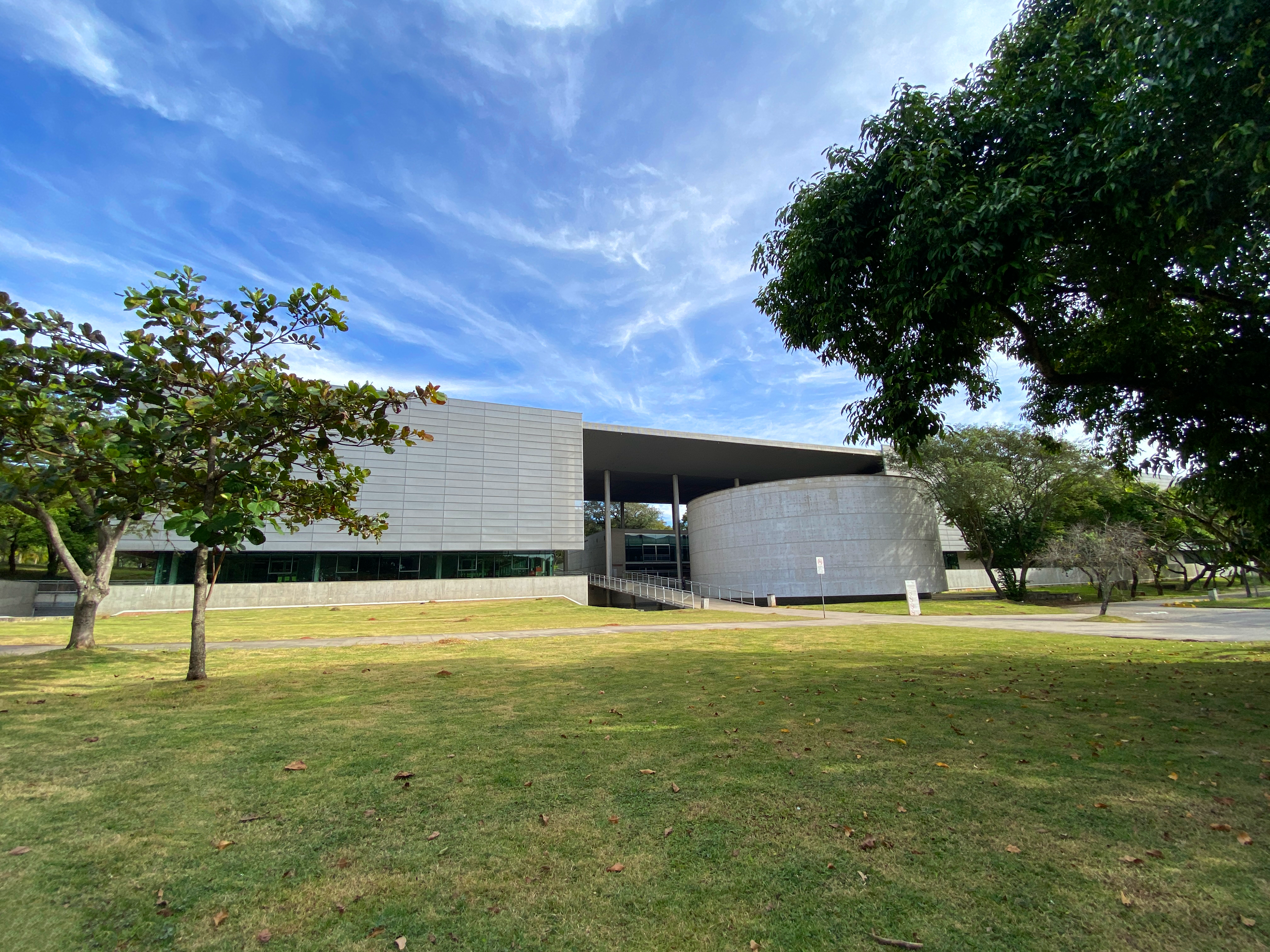
- Type: Research institute
- Established: 1962
- Founder: Sérgio Buarque de Holanda
- Parent institution: USP
- Location: São Paulo, São Paulo, Brazil; 23°33′44″S 46°43′20″W
- Website: www.ieb.usp.br

The Institute of Brazilian Studies (Instituto de Estudos Brasileiros - IEB), is a specialized research unit of the University of São Paulo (Universidade de São Paulo - USP), founded in 1962 on the initiative of Professor Sérgio Buarque de Holanda. It aims to research and document the history and culture of Brazil.

== History ==
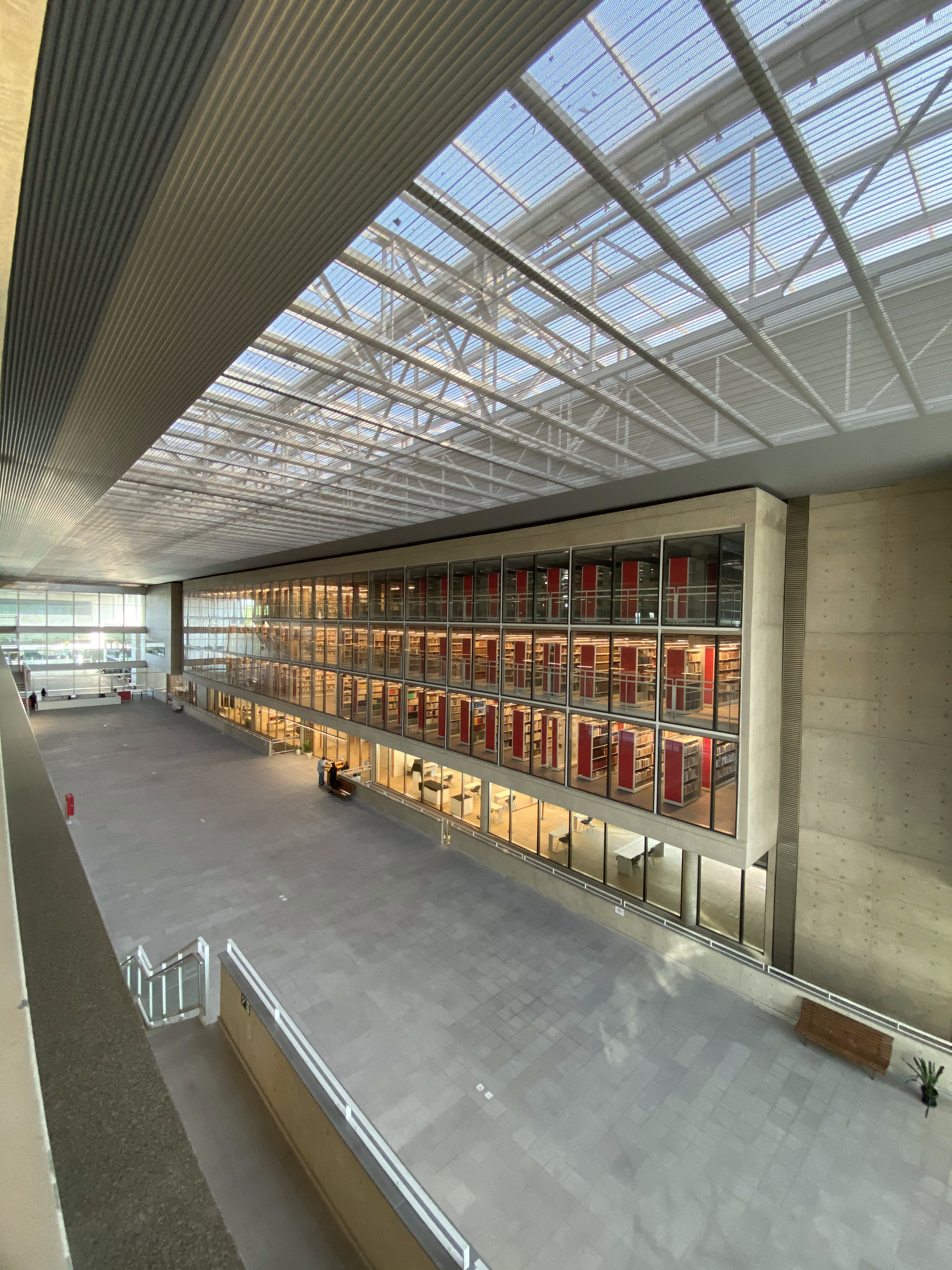
Internal space of the Institute of Brazilian Studies.

Founded in 1962, by historian Sérgio Buarque de Holanda, the Institute of Brazilian Studies (IEB) is a research center linked to the University of São Paulo (USP) that prioritizes the study of history and reflections that have Brazil as their main scope. The center has a multidisciplinary nature, housing scholars of varied backgrounds who develop research, organize and explore the collection.

The institute has a significant collection of books (including rare ones), manuscripts, documents, and works of art, from donations and purchases. Among the collections can be highlighted the Brasiliana of Professor Yan de Almeida Prado, who initiates the collection, in 1962, and later of Mário de Andrade, Graciliano Ramos, Guimarães Rosa, Camargo Guarnieri, Caio Prado Jr, Fernando de Azevedo and others.

The IEB publishes books and catalogs on fine arts, history, ethnology, rural studies, economics, literature, urbanism, and education. The magazines Almanack Braziliense and Revista do IEB are also published. It is located in the University City Armando de Salles Oliveira (Cidade Universitária Armando de Salles Oliveira - CUASO), on the west side of the city of São Paulo. In its facilities are held extension courses, undergraduate and graduate courses, seminars and exhibitions related to the history and culture of Brazil.

== Archive ==
The foundation of the archive dates back to 1968, when it was linked to the institute's library. With an increase in the number of personal files received, in 1974, the archive had to gain its own space within the university unit. Among the files received are those of names such as Anita Malfatti, Aracy Abreu Amaral, Caio Prado Jr, Camargo Guarnieri, Graciliano Ramos, João Guimarães Rosa, Mário de Andrade, Milton Santos, Manuel Correia de Andrade, Lupe Cotrim, among many other Brazilian intellectuals.

Due to the importance of the materials, some of its archives are listed by the Institute of National Historic and Artistic Heritage (Instituto do Patrimônio Histórico e Artístico Nacional - IPHAN) and recognized Memory of the World by the United Nations Educational, Scientific and Cultural Organization (UNESCO).

For the institute, archives and research are inseparable, and it is important both to analyze the thought or creative processes of the collection holder, and the sources stored by it.

== Library ==
The IEB Library is one of the richest in Brazilian subjects, with 250,000 volumes, including books, offprints, theses, periodicals, and sheet music.

Ariel Magazine, No. 8

== See also ==
- Anita Malfatti
- Mário de Andrade
- Graciliano Ramos
- Guimarães Rosa
- Caio Prado Jr
- University of São Paulo
