= Raimundo Arruda Sobrinho =

Brazilian poet and writer

- Born: 1 August 1938; Goiás, Brazil
- Died: 22 December 2020 (aged 82); Goiás, Brazil
- Occupations: Poet, writer

Raimundo Arruda Sobrinho (1 August 1938 – 22 December 2020) was a Brazilian poet and writer. Born in a rural area of Goiás on 1 August 1938, he moved to São Paulo at the age of 23 where he worked as a gardener and a book seller. In the late 1970s, early 1980s, nearly at the end of the military dictatorship of Brazil, he became homeless, and this lasted for nearly 35 years. During this period he wrote several poems and short stories, but they remained unknown until they were discovered by Shalla Monteiro in April 2011, and through Facebook Stories in the early 2014. On 22 December 2020, Shalla announced Raimundo's death on his dedicated Facebook page.
