= Academia Pernambucana de Letras =

Coordinates: 8°02′22″S 34°54′14″W

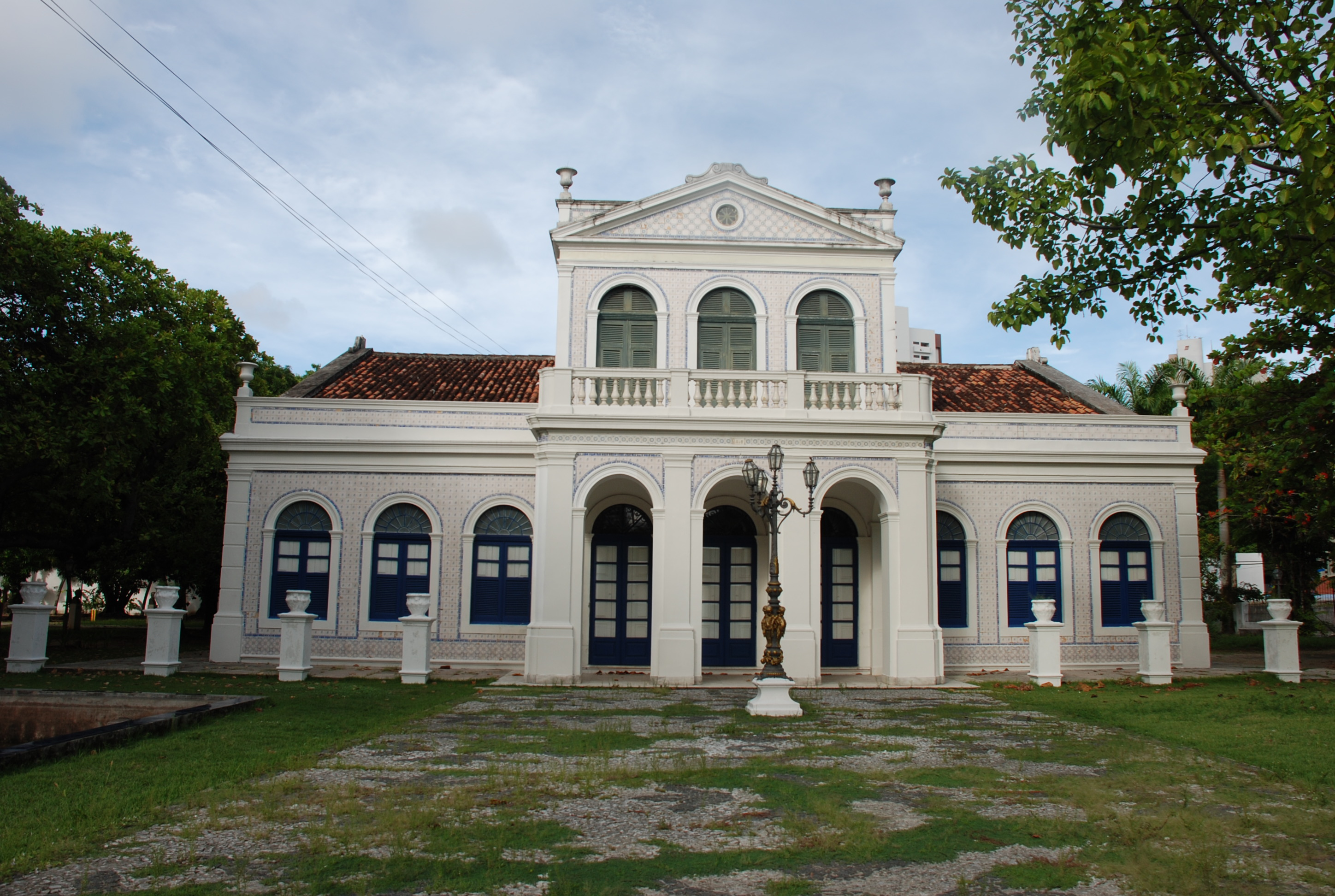
Headquarters of the Pernambuco Academy of Letters in Jaqueira district, Recife

The Academia Pernambucana de Letras (Pernambuco Academy of Letters) is a Brazilian literary society established in the manner of the Académie des Inscriptions et Belles-Lettres, on January 26, 1901, in Recife by Carneiro Vilela and other writers from the state of Pernambuco, with a total of 20 seats. One of the first letters academies of Brazil, being surpassed only by the Academia Cearense de Letras, the Academia Brasileira de Letras and the Academia Paraense de Letras.

== History ==
At the end of the 19th century, some intellectuals in Recife were considering the creation of a new literary academy, which had the name Academia Pernambucana de Letras. José Isidoro Martins Júnior, Artur da Silva Orlando, Eduardo de Carvalho and Thiago Joaquim da Fonseca addressed an invitation to Carneiro Vilela to join the new institution, which he refused, as he explained in a note in the newspaper Province.

The same Carneiro Vilela, however, was part of a group of intellectuals who founded the Academy in 1901. On December 28, 1900, a note about the imminent installation of an academia appeared in the Jornal do Recife and Diário de Pernambuco. On 14 January 1901, there was a preparatory session for the installation of the Academy, with the approval of the Organic Law and choice of patrons of the twenty seats which it would be composed of. A formal ceremony took place on January 26, with a speech by Carlos Porto Carreiro.

The Academy had been dissolved in 1910, to be reorganized in 1920. In 1921, the number of seats was increased to 30. In 1960 was increased to 40, which is the current number.

The current president of the Academy (since January 26, 2016) is Margarida Cantarelli; prior to that, it was headed for four years by the academic Fátima Quintas, and before that (for 10 years from January 26, 2002) by Waldênio Porto.

== Bibliographic references ==
- PARAÍSO, Rostand. Academia Pernambucana de Letras: sua história, v. 1. Recife: APL, 2006.
- PARAÍSO, Rostand. Academia Pernambucana de Letras: efemérides, v. 2. Recife: APL, 2006.
