= Brazilian Women Writers Collection =

Brazilian publications series

The Brazilian Women Writers Collection (Portuguese: Coleção Escritoras do Brasil) is an initiative of the Federal Senate Library, and is published by the Federal Senate Secretariat for Printing and Publishing. Its purpose is to publicise the intellectual work of Brazilian women writers who have been under-represented or practically ignored in the literary canon. By valuing these contributions, the collection seeks to recognise the activities, productions, and ideas of women in the construction of Brazil's history. It also aims to fill a significant gap in publishing by addressing the publication of Brazilian women authors, who are often overlooked in literary studies.

== Selection of authors and titles ==
The selection of authors and texts for the collection begins with a prospective search in reference works that list the majority of well-known writers within the universe of works in the public domain, that is, authors who have been dead for 70 years or more. Those who played a significant role in their time were selected, either because of the weight of their literary work or because of their innovative activities in the intellectual field, such as publishing newspapers and magazines in the 19th century.

== Volumes list ==
The table below shows the volumes released, as well as information about their authors, dates of original publication, years of release in the collection, and ISBN:

| Volume | Title | Author | Original edition | Release date | ISBN |
|---|---|---|---|---|---|
| 01 | A mulher moderna: trabalhos de propaganda | Josefina Álvares de Azevedo | 1891 | 2018 | ISBN 9786556761794 (3. ed. rev. aum., 2021) |
| 02 | Ânsia eterna | Júlia Lopes de Almeida | 1903 | 2019 | ISBN 9786556760582 (2. ed. rev., 2020) |
| 03 | Opúsculo humanitário | Nísia Floresta | 1853 | 2019 | ISBN 9786556760988 ( 2 ed. rev., 2021) |
| 04 | Mármores | Francisca Júlia da Silva | 1895 | 2020 | ISBN 9788552800729 |
| 05 | A judia Raquel: romance original de costumes | Francisca Senhorinha da Motta Diniz; A. A. Diniz | 1886 | 2020 | ISBN 9786556760452 |
| 06 | Cancros sociais: drama original em cinco atos | Maria Ribeiro | 1866 | 2021 | ISBN 9786556760612 |
| 07 | Um drama na roça | Carmen Dolores | 1907 | 2021 | ISBN 9786556761244 |
| 08 | Dálias: (1893–1897) | Auta de Souza | unpublished | 2021 | ISBN 9786556761817 |
| 09 | A infanta Carlota Joaquina: (romance histórico) | Chrysanthème | 1937 | 2022 | ISBN 9786556762593 |
| 10 | Cantigas das crianças e do povo e danças populares | Alexina de Magalhães Pinto | 1916 | 2023 | ISBN 9786556763309 |
| 11 | Aventuras de Diófanes | Teresa Margarida da Silva e Orta | 1752 | in press | |

== Next volumes ==
Some authors have already been selected for future editions. Below is a non-exhaustive list.

1. . Adélia Fonseca
2. . Ana Eurídice Eufrosina de Barandas
3. . Ana Luísa de Azevedo Castro
4. . Antonieta de Barros
5. . Maria do Carmo de Mello Rego
6. . Maria Lacerda de Moura
