= Julieta de Melo Monteiro =

Brazilian poet and writer (died 1928)

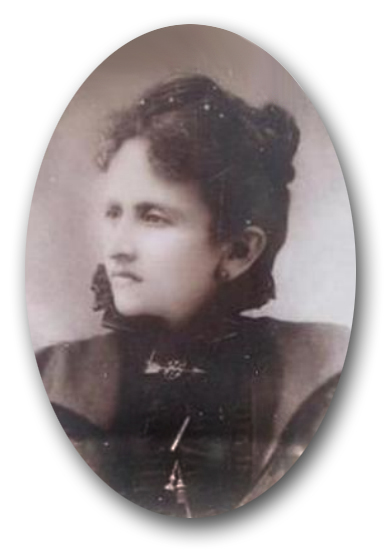
- Born: Julieta de Melo; October 21, 1855; Rio Grande, Rio Grande do Sul, Brazil
- Died: January 27, 1928 (aged 72); Rio Grande
- Occupations: Teacher, journalist, writer
- Notable work: Co-publisher of O Corymbo magazine
- Spouse: Francisco Guilherme Pinto Monteiro

Julieta de Melo Monteiro (1855 – 1928) was a Brazilian poet, writer, journalist, and teacher.

== Early life and education ==
Monteiro was born in Rio Grande, Rio Grande do Sul on 21 October 1855. Coming from a literary family, she was the daughter of the poet Revocata dos Passos Figueiroa de Melo and of João Correia de Melo, and niece of Amália dos Passos Figueiroa, a poet and journalist. Her sister, Revocata Heloísa de Melo was also a poet and journalist. She had four brothers, three of whom would die at a young age. Monteiro married the Portuguese poet Francisco Guilherme Pinto Monteiro on 21 October 1876. She published her first work at the age of nineteen, a book of verses in the Parnassian style, called Preludes.

== Writing ==
In 1878, Monteiro founded the women's magazine Violeta, whose editors and contributors were essentially female. She contributed to several newspapers, both literary and others, in the state of Rio Grande do Sul, such as Escrínio and Eco do Povo in Porto Alegre, and Progresso Literário, Tribuna Literária, and Illustração Pelotense in Pelotas. Not only a poet, she wrote short stories and plays and was also a columnist. She also published texts in A Mensageira in São Paulo, a magazine dedicated to Brazilian women. She became the patron of the Women's Literary Academy of Rio Grande do Sul and published in its magazine, Atenéia. She was also a member of the Sociedade Partenon Literário (Parthenon Literary Society), using the pseudonym "Penserosa".

In 1892, she published a book of sonnets, Oscilantes, described as being simple, descriptive and even naïve and revealing a happy childhood and youth. In 1898, she published a book of short stories, Alma e Coração (Soul and heart). Other publications were to follow, including Tabernacle, a book of verses, and the play, O Segredo de Marcial (Marcial's secret). With her sister she wrote the plays Coração de Mãe (Mother's heart), which was staged in Porto Alegre, Berilos, staged in Rio Grande, and Mário.

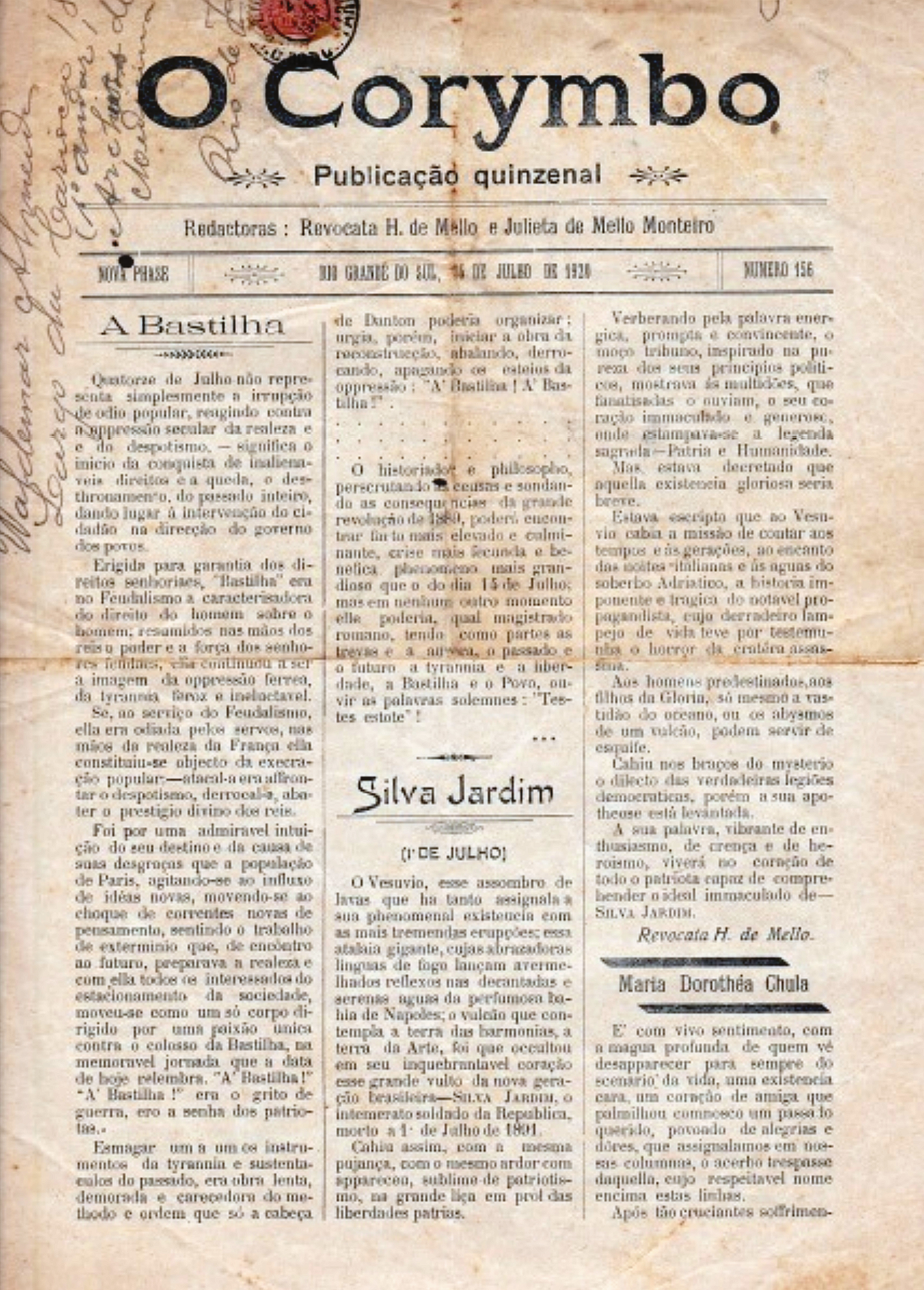
An issue of O Corymbo from 1924

== O Corymbo ==
With her sister she founded the first literary periodical in Brazil aimed at women, called O Corymbo, which was published for almost sixty years. The first issue appears to have been in June 1885, in tabloid format, with four pages. Over its lifetime the publication came out bimonthly, monthly, fortnightly, and even weekly. It covered literary subjects, poetry and brief notes relating to the life and work of people in the literary field, as well as addressing the rights of women. While producing O Corymbo she and her sister also worked as teachers. She believed that improved education was the only way to achieve female emancipation.

Monteiro was a federalist and an abolitionist. Together with Isabel de Mattos Dillon, her sister, and others she worked through the "28th of September Abolitionist Commission", an organization made up of women in the city of Rio Grande, to raise funds to purchase letters of manumission for slaves.

== Death ==
She died in Rio Grande on January 27, 1928, having written until the end of her life. After her death, her sister published posthumously, Terra Sáfara, a collection of poems. A street in Porto Alegre is named after her.
