= Celeste Jaguaribe de Matos Faria =

Celeste Jaguaribe de Matos Faria (5 April 1873 – 9 September 1938) was a Brazilian composer, pianist, poet, singer and teacher who used the pseudonym Stella Bomilcar.

== Biography ==
She was born in Rio de Janeiro, daughter of João Paulo Gomes de Mattos and Joana de Alencar Jaguaribe Gomes de Mattos.

She first studied piano in Fortaleza, and she was drawn towards music, literature, and design. She moved to Rio de Janeiro in 1900, and in 1901 she enrolled in the Instituto Nacional de Música, where she studied voice, theory, and solfeggio with Frederico Nascimento; composition with Alberto Nepomuceno; and harmony, counterpoint, and fugue with Francisco Braga. She became a singing monitor at the Instituto Nacional de Música in 1905, an adjunct professor in 1907, and a theory and solfeggio professor in 1911. She went on to study voice in Paris in 1914 with Mme. Bauer, and later returned to Europe to study in Berlin in 1928.

As a teacher, she would organize salons featuring her students at a home on Rua Fonte da Saudade, creating a well-known space for musical gatherings. Celeste Jaguaribe combined several aspects of her artistry into her career. In addition to teaching at the Instituto Nacional de Música and later at the Colégio Imaculada Conceiçao, she possessed a light soprano voice, and sang, taught voice, drew, painted, wrote poetry, and composed.

Celeste Jaguaribe began composing at the age of 13, writing waltzes and mazurkas, and developed her compositional voice further in 1928. Critics lauded her artistic sensibility as both poet and composer, and she frequently wrote for voice and piano, and developed pedagogical materials for solfeggio: Solfejo especial para orfeão (3 books), the Curso Superior de Solfejo, and Solfejos graduados (2 volumes).

== Works ==
Selected works include:

Piano Four Hands:

- Quem me dera!

Choral:

2 voices

- 12 vocalises a 2 vozes
- Cantos Recreativos e educativos - 1a série, a 2 vozes (soprano e contralto)
- Andorinhas
- Canção da velhinha
- Conselho (Text: Celeste Jaguaribe de Matos Faria)
- Esperança (Text: St. B)
- Meu coração
- Minha sombra (Text: St. B)
- Mocidade (Text: St. B)
- Oração
- Perfumes e luzes (Text: Celeste Jaguaribe de Matos Faria)
- Prece (Text: St. B)
- Recompensa
- A roseirinha florida (Text: Celeste Jaguaribe de Matos Faria)
- O tufão e a brisa (Text: St. B)

3 voices

- Cantos Recreativos e educativos - 2a série, a 3 vozes (soprano, meio-soprano e contralto)
- Aurora (Text: J. Ribeiro)
- Mágoas da noite
- O vendaval (Text: Celeste Jaguaribe de Matos Faria)

4 voices

- Lua cheia
- Padre-Nosso No. 1
- Padre-Nosso No. 2

5 voices

- Madrugada

Voice and Piano

- Aquele amor (Text: Celeste Jaguaribe de Matos Faria)
- Berceuse (Text: Celeste Jaguaribe de Matos Faria)
- Chromo (Text: Celeste Jaguaribe de Matos Faria)
- Covardia
- Interrogação (Text: Celeste Jaguaribe de Matos Faria)
- O jasmineiro (Text: Celeste Jaguaribe de Matos Faria)
- O menino curioso
- Minha vida é assim, assim (Text: Celeste Jaguaribe de Matos Faria)
- A morte da boneca (Text: Celeste Jaguaribe de Matos Faria)
- A noite
- Num postal (Text: Celeste Jaguaribe de Matos Faria)
- Olhos azuis (Text: Celeste Jaguaribe de Matos Faria)
- A pedra (Text: Celeste Jaguaribe de Matos Faria)
- Penas de garça (Text: Auta de Souza)
- Poente
- O ponte (Text: Celeste Jaguaribe de Matos Faria)
- Rosas (Text: Celeste Jaguaribe de Matos Faria)
- Saudade
- Tão só
- Treva, penumbra e luz
- Trovas (Text: Celeste Jaguaribe de Matos Faria)
- Vida fugaz
