= Karl von Koseritz =

German-Brazilian journalist

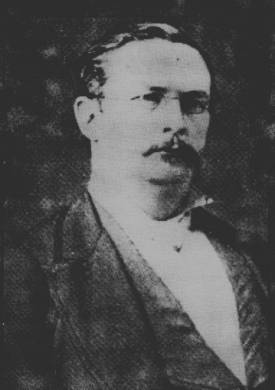
Karl von Koseritz

Karl Julius Christian Adalbert Heinrich Ferdinand von Koseritz (3 February 1834 in Dessau – 29 April 1890 in Porto Alegre) was a German-Brazilian journalist, writer, teacher, playwright and politician. He fought in the First Schleswig War as a soldier, before moving to Brazil. After arriving in 1851, he established himself in Pelotas in the province of Rio Grande do Sul. He worked as a cook, painter and bookkeeper before becoming a journalist. In 1856 he married a Brazilian woman and changed his first name to Carlos. In 1886, already living in Porto Alegre, he became editor of A Reforma, the Liberal Party's official newspaper, which headed the abolitionist campaign in the province. He continued a monarchist until his death, and was seen as an important person in the German colonies of Rio Grande do Sul.

== See also ==
- Sociedade Partenon Literário
