= Isabel de Mattos Dillon =

Brazilian suffragist

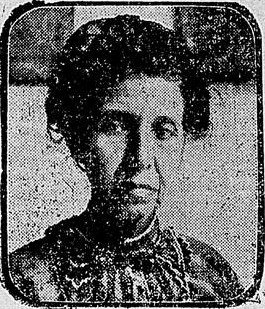
- Dillon in 1917
- Born: January 20, 1861; Bahia, Brazil
- Died: June 19, 1920 (aged 59); Rio de Janeiro
- Education: Federal University of Rio de Janeiro Faculty of Medicine
- Occupation: Dentist
- Known for: First Brazilian woman to vote
- Medical career
- Profession: Dentist

Isabel de Mattos Dillon (January 20, 1861 – June 19, 1920), also known as Isabel de Sousa Mattos and Isabel de Mattos Gonçalves, was a Brazilian suffragist. Graduating in 1883, she was one of the first Brazilian female dentists and, as well, claimed to have been the first woman to vote in Brazil. An activist for women's rights and the abolition of slavery, she was also a notable poet.

== Early life and education ==
Dillon was born in Bahia on 20 January 1861. Taking advantage of changes to the law that allowed females to attend university, she initially studied medicine but then graduated in dentistry from the Faculty of Medicine of Rio de Janeiro on 14 May 1883. By February 1884, she was already advertising her services as a dentist in Pelotas in the state of Rio Grande do Sul. In December of the same year, she organized a female abolitionist committee in the city of Rio Grande. Widowed at the age of 24, she then married a fellow dental surgeon, Thomaz Cantrell Dillon, on 17 February 1885. He was a naturalised Brazilian of English origin.

== Women's right to vote ==
In 1885, in view of her degree and based on the Brazilian law that provided the right to vote for every holder of a degree, she requested her inclusion in the list of voters in São José do Norte in Rio Grande do Sul. The municipal judge dismissed the petition on 18 November 1886 on the grounds that the electoral legislation had not considered that women might be given access to university qualifications. Although the country's constitution did not explicitly prohibit women from voting, politics in the 19th century was seen as a man's activity, so that the judge concluded that it was unnecessary to make such a prohibition explicit in the legal text. However, according to Dillon, she was later granted the right to vote after appealing and in 1887 she voted for Júlio de Mendonça Moreira, a member of the Republican Party, as a federal deputy for Rio Grande do Sul. He was not elected but was successful four years later. In 1890, when she became an unsuccessful candidate to become a national deputy representing the state of Bahia, the press described her as Brazil's first female voter.

Other women, such as Luiza Amélia Bemfica Ribeiro and Balbina de Castro Figueiredo, were included on the register of electors in the same period, but were subsequently excluded on appeal. It was not until November 1927 that women were legally entitled to vote with Celina Guimarães Viana and Júlia Alves Barbosa reportedly being the first two to register.

In 1890, Dillon returned to Rio de Janeiro. Voter registration there was controlled by district commissions, which analyzed and decided on each voter's suitability to register, based among other factors on whether they were literate. In case of doubt, the matter was forwarded to the Minister of the Interior, Cesário Alvim. She presented herself to the 2nd District of the parish of Engenho Velho in Rio Grande do Sul to obtain a diploma confirming that she had been registered to vote in 1885. The commission in Rio de Janeiro was divided between not depriving the "voter of the right to vote already acquired" and not making an exception to the then recent decision to prohibit women from registering to vote. After consulting the minister, it was decided to deny her registration. Two other women living in Rio de Janeiro state, both wives of public servants, had also applied and been rejected.

Cartoon by Antônio Bernardes Pereira Netto in Revista Illustrada, 29 March 1890, portraying minister Cesário Alvim's refusal to vote for women

== Candidate for election ==
Despite having been denied electoral registration in 1890, Dillon sought election as a federal deputy for Bahia in 1891. Her platform was published in Brazilian newspapers, in which she said she was against socialism and promised to defend principles of equality, religious freedom, freedom of thought and the right to vote and be voted for. She also advocated laws to protect women and children, one of the first people to do so. At the time, Brazil did not have voting slips and no prior registration of candidates. The limited number of people entitled to vote just wrote the names of the people they supported on a piece of paper. Despite not campaigning in Bahia, Dillon received some support, but not enough to be elected. In the same national election, Maria Augusta Meira de Vasconcelos Freire was also a candidate for deputy in Pernambuco state. The experiences of Dillon and others inspired the comedy O Voto Feminino, (Women's Vote), in which Josefina Álvares de Azevedo ridiculed the male refusal to both give the vote to women and vote for women.

== Work for abolition of slavery ==
In 1884, Isabel created the 28th of September Abolitionist Commission, an organization made up of women in the city of Rio Grande. Also participating were the writer Revocata Heloísa de Melo and her sister Julieta de Melo Monteiro. The Commission's objective was to raise funds to purchase letters of manumission. The abolitionist movement was mostly male, but the men recognized the strategic importance of women's participation. Openly opposed to Floriano Peixoto, president of Brazil from 1891 to 1894, she participated in the Second Revolta da Armada in 1893 and was arrested. She would subsequently write about her experiences.

== Poetry ==
A prestigious name at the beginning of the 20th century, she contributed articles to various Brazilian periodicals and wrote many sonnets, having them published in newspapers and books.

== Personal life ==
Dillon's daughter, Niobe Elisabeth Gonçalves, who she had brought up as a single mother, died in 1913 at the age of 20 when she was four months pregnant, having already had three children. The case was the subject of a police investigation due to suspicions of medical malpractice and self-induced abortion.

== Death ==
Dillon continued working as a dental surgeon and as secretary of the Women's Republican Party. She died in Rio de Janeiro on 19 June 1920. She was buried as a pauper in the Inhaúma cemetery.
