= Sociedade Partenon Literário =

Literary Society from Southern Brazil

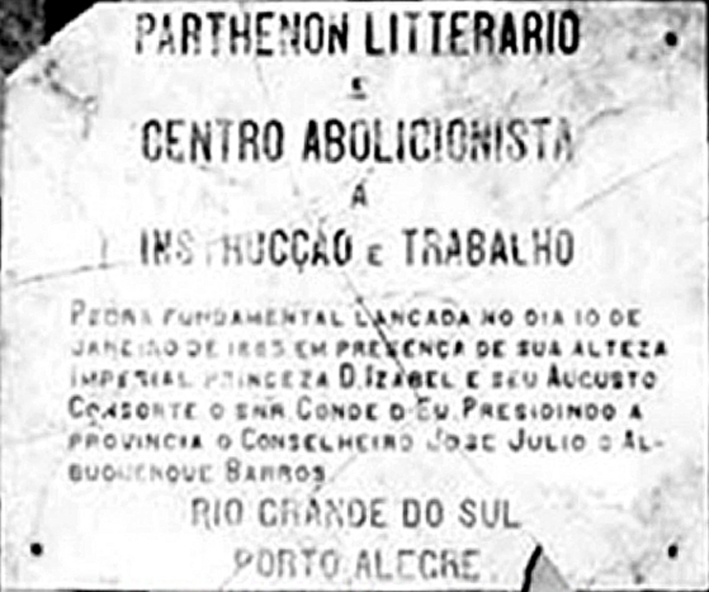
Cornerstone of the projected 1885 headquarters, which was never built

The Sociedade Parthenon Literário ("Literary Parthenon Society"), better known simply as Parthenon Litterario, was a Brazilian literary society created in Porto Alegre, the capital of Rio Grande do Sul, considered the main cultural association of the state in the 19th century.

== Overview ==
Appearing in a period when Letters were in an embryonic state and the population was massively illiterate, the Parthenon Litterario was the entity that effectively formed and consolidated the regional literary system, founding a renowned monthly magazine, stimulating the practice of reading and literary creation. It promoted the people's education with classes and other activities, organized regular soirées and conferences on literary and philosophical subjects, and a variety of other themes relevant to that historical moment, such as the moralization of customs, the national political model, the educational system, the definition of regional identity, the abolition of slavery, and the emancipation of women. The society was a main agent for the liberation of slaves in Porto Alegre and had an important influence in politics and in the dissemination of the republican ideal.

Founded in 1868 by a group of around twenty people, the Parthenon Litterario grew to more than 140 effective members and a network of collaborators with more than 300 people, bringing together much of the intellectual elite of the state, with José Antônio do Vale Caldre e Fião and, above all, Apolinário Porto-Alegre as leaders. It was praised in its time as a source of important cultural and social advances, but some of its initiatives failed, and most of its specifically literary production is valued today mainly for its role of cultural dynamizer and structurer of the literary system, and for having laid the foundations of a literature of regionalist character, praising the figure of the gaucho, (Note: Gaucho (in Portuguese, gaúcho) also refers to the people native to the state of Rio Grande do Sul.) the folklore, the history of the state and the countryside scenery, within a romanticist framework. The cultural project of the Parthenon aggregated a generation of new talents, formed a new reading public, gave rise to the emergence of libraries, schools, associations, and literary publications in many cities of the state, and the society's activities offered a complete portrait of the Rio Grande do Sul intellectuality of the end of the 19th century.

The society ceased its activities around 1888 and was reactivated in 1892, functioning precariously for a few more years. It was officially extinguished in 1899. Its history and contribution are still poorly known or little studied. In 1997, admirers of the entity's legacy re-founded it with the updated spelling Sociedade Partenon Literário, resuming the practice of regular sessions, promoting diversified activities, and launching several publications.

== History ==
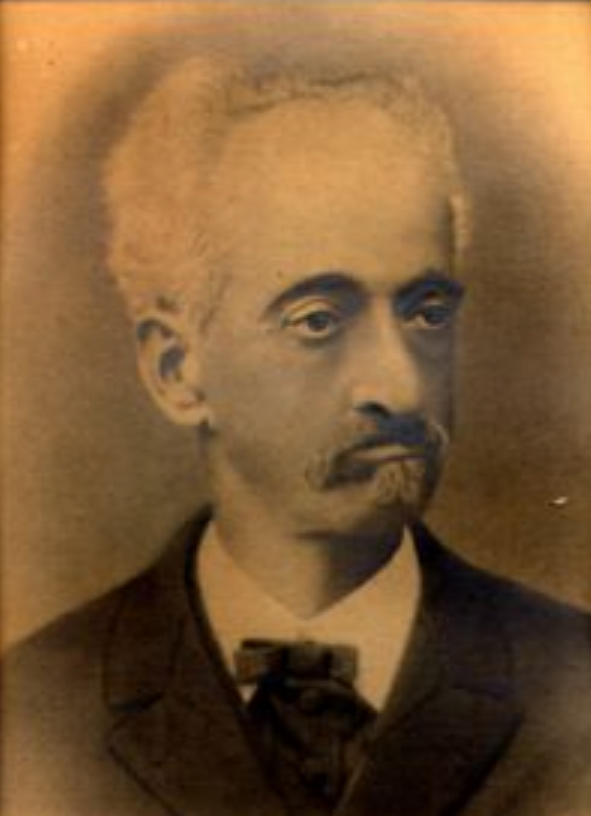
Apolinário Porto-Alegre.

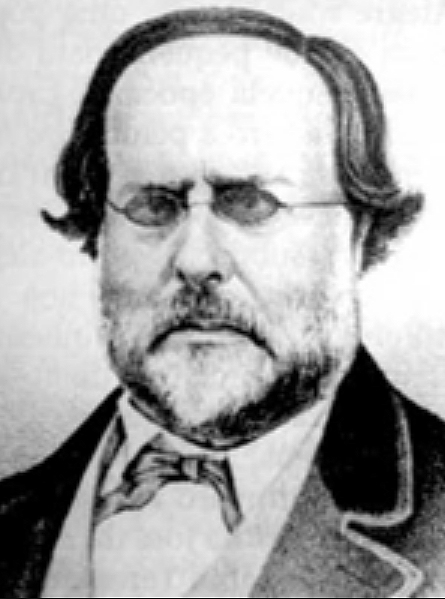
Caldre e Fião.

The Sociedade Partenon Literário was founded on 18 June 1868, in Porto Alegre, in a period of social and political effervescence, with the Paraguay War in progress, republican ideas expanding, and a strong revival of the abolitionist movement. The local culture was still in its infancy, in a context that had been marked by a history of repeated military conflicts since the 18th century, by the main preoccupation with political and economic issues, poor education, and a chronic shortage of resources. Until the appearance of the Parthenon, few newspapers had been founded in the province, and even fewer were literary magazines, all of fleeting existence. Mainly through these rare vehicles, a meager literature of regional origin circulated, still very modest. However, a cultural movement was beginning and a significant group of intellectuals were active in Porto Alegre, Pelotas, and Rio Grande, the main urban centers.

According to Regina Zilberman,

"if the manifestations that occurred in the thirties of the 19th century mark the emergence of literature in the south, its development occurred slowly, due to the more primitive circumstances of the environment. The cities were small, and the instruments of diffusion were reduced, adding to this the dependence on poetic guidelines coming from Rio de Janeiro. The solution found by the intellectuals was a kind of alliance under the aegis of a literary journal. Several periodicals were founded to shelter the writers; the first of them, O Guayba, which appeared in 1856, was short-lived."

The creation of the Parthenon Litterario had the collaboration of approximately twenty founding members, but was centered on two figures: the physician and writer José Antônio do Vale Caldre e Fião and the young Apolinário José Gomes Porto-Alegre. Caldre e Fião, besides mentoring the new group and constantly supporting the initiative, lent his personal prestige, since he was a well-known author, being elected honorary president. Apolinário was fundamental for his dynamism and posture, and was the undisputed leader of the society. According to Luciana Boeira, his activity was so dominant that "it is practically impossible to think about the institution without thinking about the action that Apolinário exercised for its maintenance." In the meetings that preceded the foundation, a provisional board was formed, composed of Vasco de Araújo e Silva (president), Antônio Ferreira Neves and Aurélio Veríssimo de Bittencourt (secretaries); Caldre e Fião, José Bernardino dos Santos, Manuel Pereira da Silva Ubatuba and Hilário Ribeiro de Andrade e Silva (statutes). The first effective president was Firmino Antônio de Araújo.

Achilles Porto Alegre has recorded a memory of the founding times:

"Although the Paraguayan War had taken away the flower of our youth, we still managed to form a group of men of letters. Before this time, one or another writer, in the isolation of his office, without an exchange of ideas, gave himself to the culture of letters. Our intellectuals walked aimlessly, without a certain destination, distanced from each other as if crossing an immense desert, relying only on their value. [...] They were few, it is true, but each one of them gave at least one good example of courage. These were the pioneers who broke new ground, where later a temple was to be erected entirely dedicated to literature. Around Apolinário Porto-Alegre, a group of dreamers gathered, who would listen to him as an oracle. [...] In his residence at Rua Nova, nowadays General Andrade Neves, the preparatory sessions for the foundation of the Parthenon were held. The inauguration of the Parthenon took place in the same place where the Chapel of São José is, at Rua de Bragança."

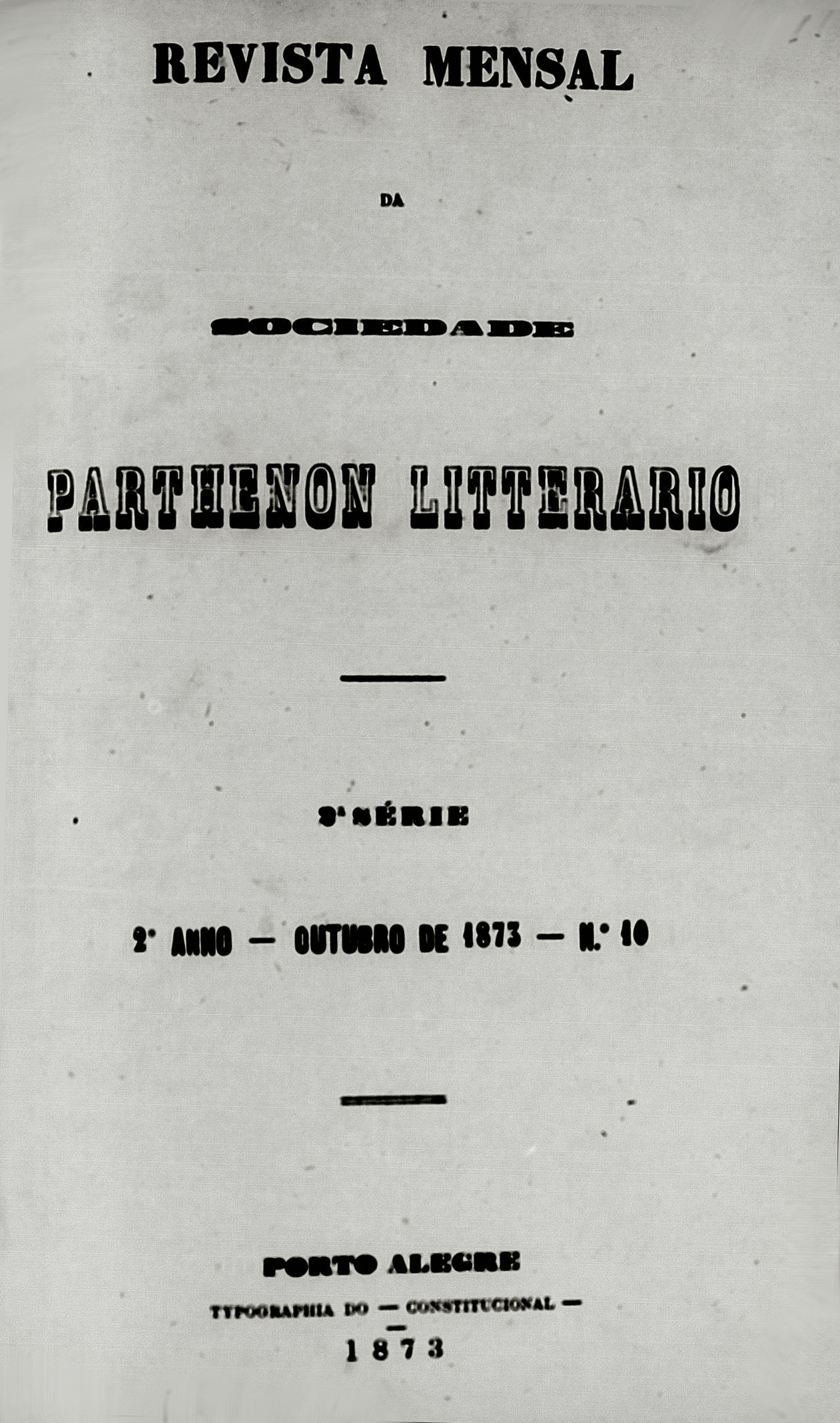
Cover of the Monthly Magazine of the Literary Parthenon (Revista Mensal do Parthenon Litterario), n. 10, 1873

In the following year, the society launched the Revista Mensal da Sociedade Parthenon Litterario magazine, with an editorial board formed by Vasco de Araujo e Silva, Apolinário Porto Alegre, Lúcio Porto Alegre, Aurélio de Bittencourt, Menezes Paredes, and Hilário Ribeiro. Its foundation was met with some opposition and disbelief, and by reports from Apolinário, it only came to light after receiving the support of the reputed journalist, military, and former congressman Felipe Nery. The society faced difficulties to maintain itself, and in the early 1870s, it suffered the first of its several interruptions. Still, in its most active period, it had distribution agents in numerous inland cities, ensuring coverage of almost the entire Rio Grande do Sul territory, as well as being distributed in Rio de Janeiro and Mato Grosso.

The emergence of the Parthenon is part of the tradition of the illustrated academies, which flourished in Europe since the 16th century and were imitated in Brazil. Like them, the Parthenon allowed the exchange of information, texts, and ideas among its members, who had different origins, occupations, and experiences, promoting the circulation of articles in its magazine and in different newspapers that traveled the most distant corners of Rio Grande do Sul, being not only a cultural and political forum but also an important space for socialization, at a time when such spaces were rare in the city. However, this same diversity, which added richness to its legacy, was the cause of polemics and internal friction.

The society was interested in general education and set up a museum, a library, and a night school, which in 1873 taught classes of French, English, philosophy, rhetoric, history, geography, arithmetic, algebra, and geometry. The Parthenon propagated republican ideals and also promoted soirées, regular conferences, and debates on various themes, such as the Ragamuffin War, marriage, religion, education, morality, civic virtue, death penalty, and feminism, intervening, as Athos Damasceno said,

"in all sectors of social life, in whose development the most advanced postulations of the time would heat up. [...] In the heat of the debates, through the pen and the word, public opinion becomes aware and clarifies itself, in fact, and opportunely, of the problems that most affect it – the abolition of slavery, freedom of worship, the emancipation of women, the urgencies of popular instruction, political franchises."

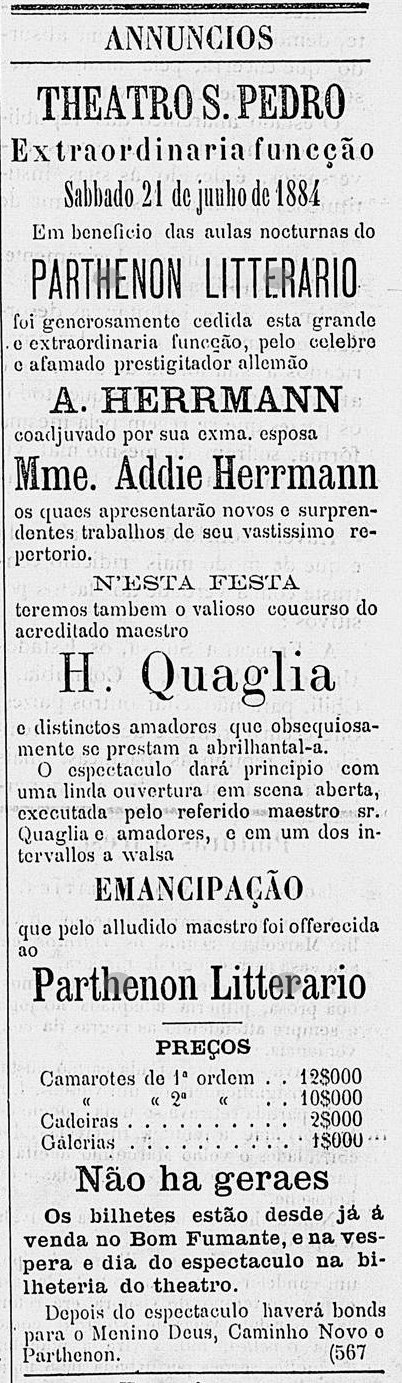
News announcing a special session at the São Pedro Theater to benefit the Parthenon Litterario's night classes in 1884.

The Parthenon was also a form of decisive importance for the articulation, within a romantic framework, of the regionalist aesthetic, and for beginning the consolidation of the image of the gaucho, a character associated with championing activities, as a symbol of the people of the entire state and as a synthesis of their ideal moral, spiritual, and civic virtues. Múcio Teixeira left a succinct account of his activities:

"Besides the punctual publication of this magazine [the Revista Mensal], the Parthenon held bi-weekly sessions (one private to the members, the other open to their families), the dancing part beginning as soon as the literary soirée was over, which began with a lecture on a philosophical, artistic, historical or current affairs subject. Each one of us tried hard to catch the auditorium's attention with new ideas, crafted in a capricious style, achieving some real triumphs on the podium. We also put on stage, monthly, at the São Pedro Theater, dramas and original comedies by our confreres, with the roles played by some of them with the help of ladies from the best Porto Alegre society. And the material product of these shows was destined to the liberation of the captives, who received the letter of freedom in an open scene, among speeches and poetry, palms and flowers, applauses and blessings. [...]

"In the Parthenon library, the less fortunate members studied day and night, and there they found books at will, quill, paper, and ink for their literary essays, giving then to that ardent and courageous youth the greatest expansion to the propaganda of the new ideas, which soon found echoes in the voices of the students of the Military School of Porto Alegre, many of whom managed later to link their name to the most salient political facts that unfolded from the last years of the Empire until after the Republic was proclaimed."

The society's trajectory was irregular and its internal history is barely known, but in 1872, as the minutes of this year show, one of the few well-documented, the institution was going through a serious crisis. A climate of discord had set in, and criticisms from the associates multiplied regarding various aspects. The librarian was accused of neglecting the care of the collection and of not having yet provided a catalog, the treasurer did not present the balance sheet, the commission in charge of revising the statutes was inert, there were outstanding debts, the sessions were impaired by poor organization, next year's elections were threatened, and some accused others of creating intrigue and deliberately spreading confusion. In December, members Aurélio de Bittencourt, João Câncio Gomes, and Múcio Teixeira, who had founded the Sociedade Ensaios Literários, were expelled. In the following year, whose minutes have also survived, show that the situation improved, and the main interest turned to reorganize the administration and the project of building its headquarters. In 1879, the Revista Mensal was restructured, being published as the Revista Contemporânea do Parthenon Litterario (Contemporary Magazine of the Parthenon Litterario) but it no longer had the vigor of before and was discontinued in September of the same year.

Throughout its existence, the Parthenon functioned in several places, without ever having headquarters. According to Sérgio da Costa Franco, shortly after its foundation, the society lent its name to a real estate development in a suburb organized by Fernando dos Santos Pereira, who, in return, gave the Parthenon two plots of land for the construction of its headquarters. The subdivision was located on a high hill, and the building was to be an imitation of the Parthenon in Athens, also located on a hill. One of the plots was sold to pay for the construction. In November 1873, in a ceremony attended by João Pedro Carvalho de Morais, president of the province, and Dom Sebastião Dias Laranjeira, bishop of Porto Alegre, the cornerstone of the building was laid which, however, was never built, but was enough to baptize one of the city's current neighborhoods, the Parthenon. On that land today stands the Santo Antônio Church. In 1884, a plan to purchase the headquarters of the Sociedade Bailante Soirée Porto Alegrense was outlined, for 20 contos de réis, but the idea was not carried through. At this time the society was meeting in a house on Rua de Bragança.

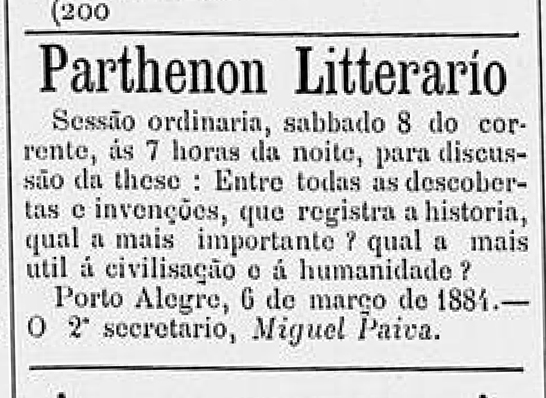
News in the newspaper A Federação announcing a session of the Parthenon Litterario on 6 March 1884

Another attempt was made on 10 January 1885, when the cornerstone of a building located at Rua Riachuelo was laid, with the presence of Princess Isabel and Count D'Eu. In January 1886, a competition was announced for the project, which was to have a main façade imitating the Parthenon in Athens, a hall for sessions and soirées occupying the entire width of the building (and to be lavishly decorated), a room for the library, another for the museum, one more for classes and another for the practice of arts and crafts, as well as support facilities such as a room for the doorman, and storage rooms. The building would be of great proportions, crossing an entire block, with two façades, the main one on Rua Riachuelo and the back one on Rua Jerônimo Coelho. The author of the winning project would receive a 300 thousand réis prize. A budget of 30 contos de réis was available for the works. The chosen project was the design by engineer João Pünder, but as with the first project, the second was never realized.

Meanwhile, since November of the previous year, the Parthenon had moved to a palace at Rua Sete de Setembro 49, reopening the People's School, which offered at the time the subjects of reading and analysis of the Portuguese language, calligraphy, geography, French, and linear drawing. However, in May 1886, there were news in the press expressing concerns about the fate of the society, there being no more record of sessions, until then regular. In May and June 1888, two sessions were announced, the last that the press records. In April 1892, the remaining members met at the headquarters of the Jornal do Comércio, under the leadership of Aquiles Porto-Alegre, the last president to reactivate the Parthenon, and a new deliberative assembly was called, which was held at the Theatro São Pedro, and a commission was chosen to revise the old statutes and arrange the rent of a building for its headquarters. A house at No. 10 Rua Nova was rented, meetings resumed, and on 14 September, a new board of directors was to be elected, but its records virtually disappeared. According to Benedito Saldanha, president of the contemporary reincarnation of the Parthenon, the activities ended definitively around 1896, and according to Sérgio da Costa Franco, "the society was only officially dissolved in May 1899, according to a detailed report in the Jornal do Comércio on May 24 of that year. But since the previous decade, it had gone into hibernation."

The reasons for this decline are unclear and may have been multiple. Internal frictions were a constant, and by the 1880s Caldre and Fião and other prominent partners had died. Authors such as Riopardense de Macedo, Cássia Silveira, and Carlos Baumgarten believe that dissent, depletion of financial resources, and the sheer aging of their proposal were major factors; for Guilhermino César the acidity of the criticism of the bourgeois, the nobility and the conservatives made by some members, ended up driving away those who were traditionalists and monarchists, causing fissures even among the republicans. Luis Augusto Fischer believes that other aspects of a changing political context may have been a decisive factor:

"I can give some hypotheses, which I would very much like to be able to prove by more documentary research, which we lack. For example, Apolinário and others from Parthenon were republicans, but they were not positivists. When the Rio-grandense Republican Party (PRR) started to act, especially with the newspaper A Federação, Apolinário was with them, but it seems to me that his temperament was democratic, deeply, while the dominant ideology among the PRR leaders was authoritarian. It is known that, in 1893, Apolinário's house was sacked, and it was necessary for him to flee to Uruguay. So, putting these isolated facts together, it seems clear to me that Apolinário had no space in the new order, or among the new republican generation, which would be a very valuable alliance."

Its disappearance left a vacuum that was hard to be filled. In 1924, the critic João Pinto da Silva lamented "The extinction of the benevolent society marked the return of Porto Alegre to the literary doldrums, from which until now we have not been able to emancipate ourselves." Around 1925, the land destined for the construction of its headquarters on the hill of Santo Antônio was donated to the Santa Casa de Misericórdia, erasing the last traces of the Parthenon.

The Parthenon had over 150 members, mostly civil servants, with a significant number of professors, and included politicians, professionals, actors, and three religious people. Many of the members were associated with political parties and newspapers. More than 300 people were in some way connected to the society. Its honorary members, elected to lend prestige to the institution, were the president of the province Antônio da Costa Pinto e Silva, the bishop of Porto Alegre Sebastião Dias Laranjeira, and Manuel Marques de Sousa, count of Porto Alegre. Besides those already mentioned in the text, other prominent members were Alberto Coelho da Cunha (Vítor Valpírio), Lobo da Costa, Apelles Porto Alegre, Aurélio Veríssimo de Bittencourt, Luciana de Abreu, Pedro Antônio de Miranda, João Damasceno Vieira Fernandes Francisco Xavier da Cunha, Pedro Soledade, Augusto Rodrigues Totta, Joaquim Alves Torres, Dionísio Monteiro, José Carlos de Sousa Lobo, Silvino Vidal, Clarimundo Santos, Argemiro Galvão, Bernardo Taveira Júnior, Bibiano Francisco de Almeida, and Karl von Koseritz.

== Main areas of performance ==
=== Themes ===
The Parthenon Litterario dealt with a wide variety of polemic topics at the time. As Guilhermino César put it, "its generous mentors wanted it spread to all domains of the intelligence, guiding letters and arts, mitigating social injustices, pointing directions to political organization." A sample of the breadth of the group's interests was offered by Luciana Boeira in her analysis of the most debated topics in the period 1872–1873:

- Identification of the main representatives of the Brazilian nationality in the literary field.
- Influence of the Pericles Century on literature and historiography.
- Identification with the most brilliant period in the history of Rome.
- Judgment of the merit of bloodshed in the struggle for freedom.
- Judgment of the means employed to achieve the ends.
- Identification of which of the forms of government of antiquity brought more prosperity, which most influenced modern times, and which was the ideal of freedom throughout history.
- Judgment on the merits of the Paraguayan invasion of Rio Grande do Sul in 1865.
- Comparative judgment of the merit of the life of the priest and the soldier.
- Judgment on the value of the crusades to modern life.
- Analysis of the institution of marriage from the Catholic viewpoint and judgment of the merit of the indissolubility of the bonds for the interests of modern society.
- Comparative judgment of the nobility and generosity of male and female passions and feelings.
- Identification of the best means of combating the influence of the Jesuits on education;
- The debate about the thesis of the immortality of the soul.
- Identification of the causes of the Ragamuffin War and judgment of its merit.
- Gender equality and judgment of their merit.

Overall, however, the society marked the history of Rio Grande do Sul primarily for its activity in the literary, educational, and abolitionist fields, for its interest in the appreciation of women and regionalism, as well as for its political influence.

=== Literature ===
The Parthenon generation had been formed within a humanistic educational tradition, established in Brazil by the Jesuits and later by the regal classes. Although in the 1860s there was already a significant contingent of Protestants and a small minority of other faiths, the majority of the province's population was Catholic. The educational system, after the basic literacy phase, was divided into specific areas: Grammar (including Latin and Portuguese Literature), Rhetoric (History and Geography), Philosophy (Logic, Ethics, and Metaphysics), and Experimental Sciences (Physics, Chemistry, Natural history, Geometry, Drawing, Arithmetic, Trigonometry, and Algebra). Depending on the availability of masters, French and Greek classes could also be included in the curriculum. In these studies, there was a constant reference to authors of Greco-Roman antiquity, considered to be models, and for this reason, the literary production of the Parthenonists is rich in allusions to Classicism and is influenced by their oratory, literature, mythology, and their ethical and educational principles. Since Ancient Greece the cultivation of virtue was embedded in their educational system and considered fundamental to the formation of a "perfect citizen".

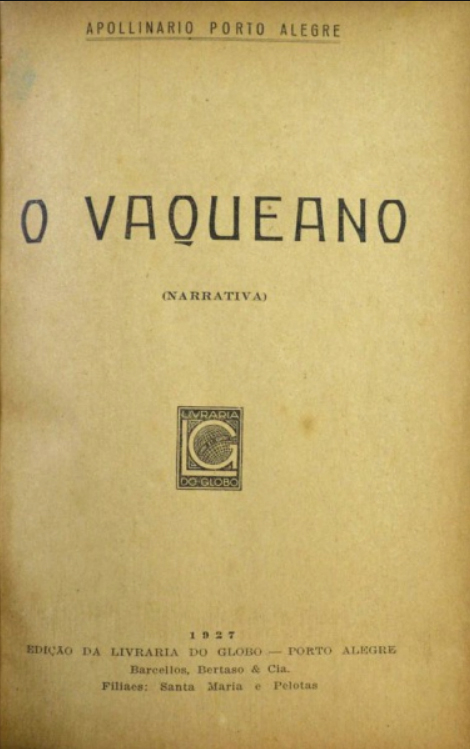
Cover of O Vaqueano (1872) by Apolinário Porto-Alegre, in a 1927 edition

A more defined literary classicism appeared in Brazil at the end of the 18th century with the Neoclassicism writers, a school that left some marks in the first essays of southern literature, which only began in the 1830s, when the school was almost exhausted. The evolution was slow and local production would have to wait for the appearance of the Parthenon to establish itself definitively. Despite the strong classical heritage carried by its leading members, in terms of style, the Parthenon flourished primarily as a Romantic group, a movement that, in contrast to classical rationalism, restraint, impersonality, and universality, valued the individual, regional specificities, emotion, independence, and enthusiasm. It acted as a center of gravity around which a new interest in roots was articulated, by the origin myths, by local identity, history and its characteristic settings and types; structured new regionalist literature in the province and identified its place in the diversity of the Brazilian panorama; and set the direction for much of the intellectual, political and ideological activity of the society, with José de Alencar's work as one of the main literary models.

Guilhermino César stated that through the pages of the society's magazine, it is possible to follow month by month the change in style and theme of the younger members of the entity, who are moving towards a nationalist and regionalist romanticism. In the 19th century, the view of history as a linear and cumulative process predominated, and many of the classical ideals were maintained through new readings. Guilhermino César mentioned that in their idealization of regional types, the Parthenonists placed them in a kind of Creole Arcadia.

However, in the early nineteenth century, the doctrine of art for art's sake had not yet been defined, and the tendency was to see literature not only as leisure but also as a social function. This opinion was still current at the end of the century, as exemplified by the words of the reputed writer, Gonçalves de Magalhães, one of the founders of national Romanticism, who stated in 1865: "The literature of a people is the development of what it has of the most sublime in ideas, of most philosophical in thought, of most heroic in morals, and most beautiful in nature." This idealism did not prevent that from the 1850s, imitating the national example, and popular literature of quick consumption began to proliferate in the province, mainly through the press.

Amid a growing influx of imported texts, it was a concern of the Parthenon to encourage the local production of literature, but, advocating a project of regeneration of civilization, the educational and moralizing function of literature was always strongly emphasized. Even works by famous writers were discouraged if they could harm the ethics and good manners of the population, and moral education was among the main interests of the members. Caldre and Fião, for example, mentioned that "the pleasant should come after the useful and this after the necessary." The popular taste had a considerable space among the Parthenonists, and many of the texts published in their journal were mild and accessible, aimed especially at the female public, although the works were selected by the criteria of morality and educational value. Even though within the Parthenon's program there was a strong concern to establish aesthetic refinement as a central element of good literature, better delimiting its field of action and its character, to perform its task, the literate could not only know how to write well but should follow a strict code of ethics, assuming a "mission" that was often compared to the priesthood or the career of arms, and should be a polymath, mastering broad knowledge in a variety of subjects, keeping in force many of the ideals of the "man of letters" that had been formulated since the previous century.

The main Parthenonists also intended to keep literature away from politics, claiming that it could spoil its purity, but in practice this did not occur, coming into direct conflict with their project of changing the directions of the history, culture, and society of Rio Grande do Sul through literature, producing works of a strong ideological and politicized nature, and establishing alliances with parties and politicians for their initiatives to be carried out.

The Parthenon played a fundamental role in the aesthetic organization and diversification of the literary theme, as well as in the valorization of the literate as a professional, promoting the passage from a system of dispersive "literary manifestations" to the formation of a "literature", as a continuous and organized production of works capable of being identified as part of a movement with its own identity and a defined function. For this organizing and valuing role, and for the consistency and long duration of its project, the society was recognized by the consensus of historians as the one responsible for the foundation of a literary system (Note: System meaning an organization of agents and instances that included a body of producers (writers and critics) aware of their role, a market (reading public), mechanisms of transmission and reproduction of a specific cultural-literary code, a distribution network, and a context that allowed the erection of literature as an autonomous field.) in the province, with the Revista Mensal as its main instrument.

=== Revista Mensal ===
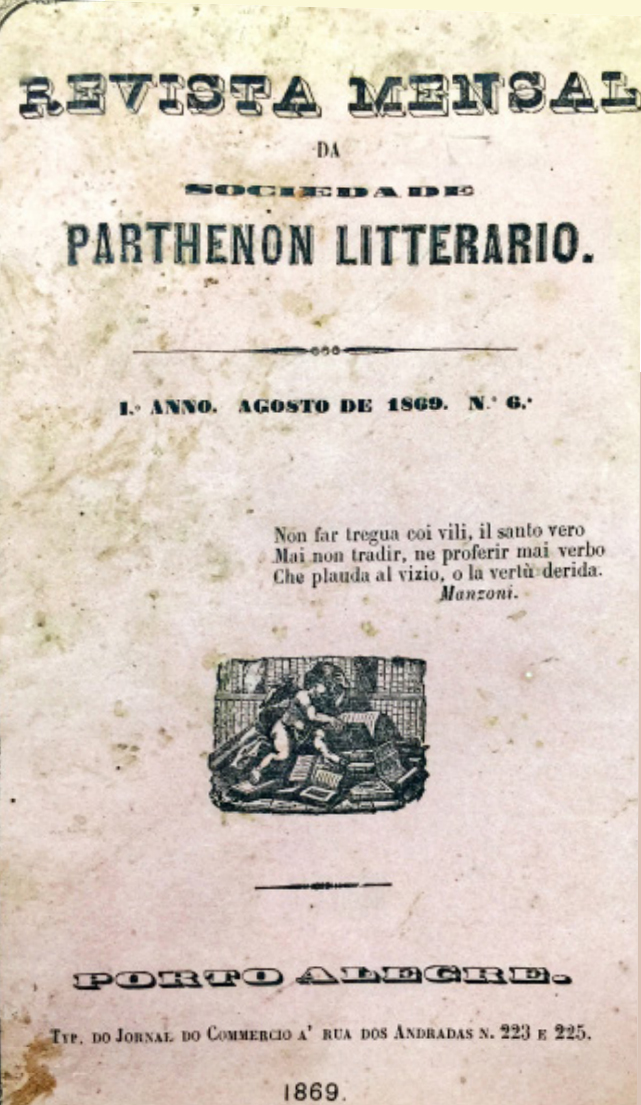
Cover of the Monthly Magazine (Revista Mensal), No. 6, August 1869.

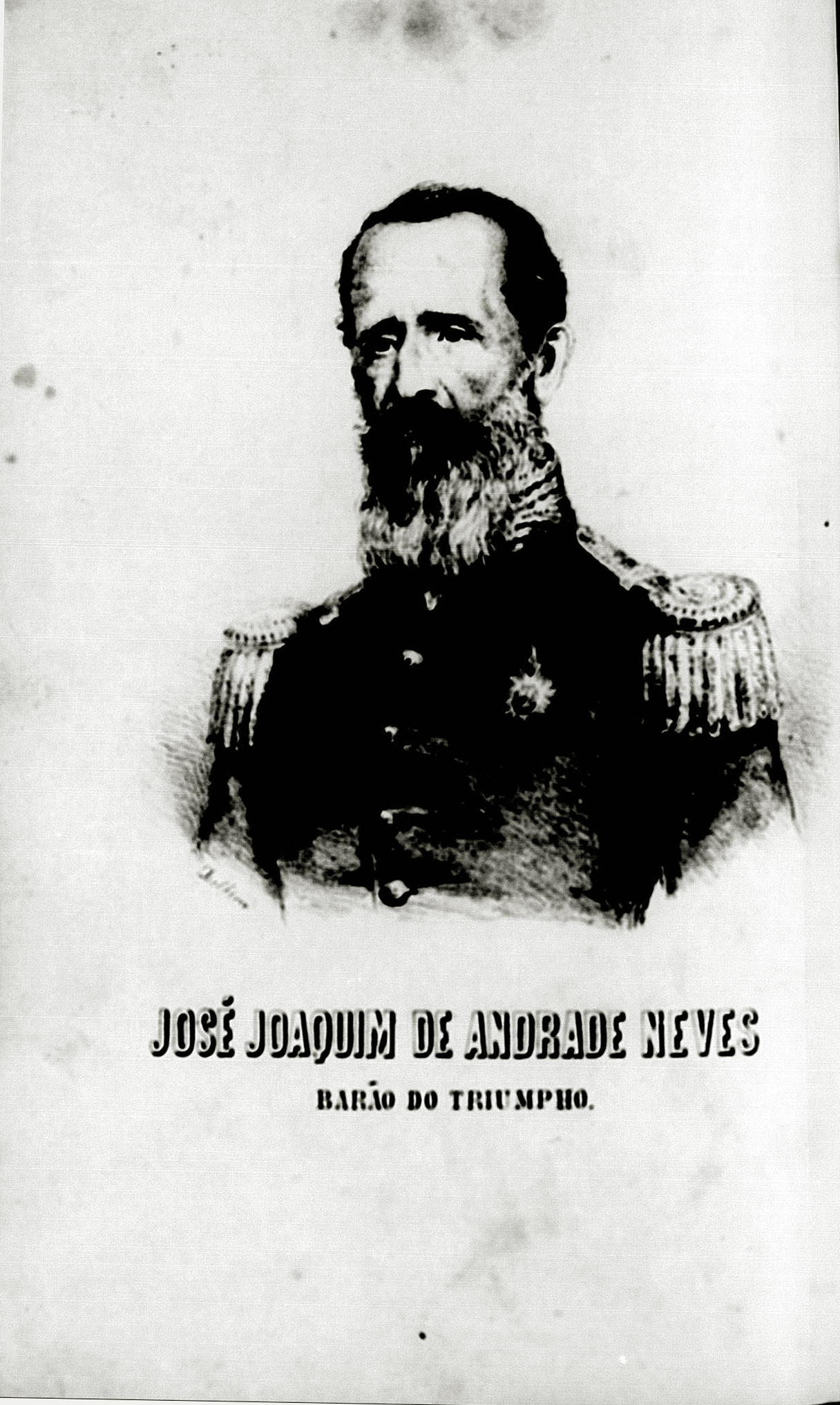
Portrait of the Baron of Triumph in the Revista Mensal, No. 6, June 1873.

The Revista Mensal (Monthly Magazine) of the Parthenon Litterario Society was published from March 1869 to September 1879, with some interruptions. In each issue one of the members of the commission took on the role of editor-in-chief, and was responsible for organizing the volume and writing an editorial, the "Monthly Chronicle", which presented a report of the society's activities or brought relevant news from the province and beyond, being valuable historical documents. The magazine was printed at the printers of the Jornal do Comércio. Athos Damasceno mentions that it likely had a free distribution, but in an 1875 issue a subscription fee appears. The charging might have become a necessity at a certain point.

The magazine did not have the expected repercussion at its launch, but soon was regularly praised in the press for the benefits it had been bringing to the cultural world and the society of the province. A survey conducted by Pedro Leite Villas Boas identified a total of 78 collaborators, eight of them women. However, the value of these individual contributions was not homogeneous, and on the whole, their specifically literary value was considered low by Moysés Vellinho, who stated, "Their pages, crusted with a rhetoric that for us has completely lost its sense and taste, retain a purely historical interest," noting that "in their time they played a considerable function, a function that cannot fail to be taken into account in the inventory of our literary evolution." Athos Damasceno agreed, analyzing that "really, although of little or no value for letters, these pages, however, vividly translate the aspirations of the time and attest to the warmth, the commitment with which here was then trying to respond to the appeals of the historical moment, expressively in tune with the spirit of renewal of customs, institutions, and ideas already in full bloom in other cultural areas of Brazil."

The magazine contained literary criticism, commentaries, editorials, and studies on Rio Grande do Sul's history and culture. Speeches given in society were then transcribed for the magazine, in addition to short stories, narratives, plays, and poetry. The longer texts were divided into several parts and published over several issues. According to Alexandre Lazzari, "in their majority, the writers who contributed to the Parthenon magazine preferred to write short stories and poems about the feelings and customs of the urban society, with special concern for the moral education of the family girls." Almost every issue featured a biography of an illustrious personage, accompanied by a portrait, which was presented as a model of virtue that the youth should imitate. Those chosen were generally educated men, military men, politicians, and professors from the recent past, who had not distinguished themselves by radical ideological or party adherences, demonstrating the society's interest in reaching the widest possible public. In an editorial, Caldre e Fião emphasized the function of these texts:

"It is more useful, I say again, for us to engrave virtue, glory, heroism upon bronze or marble, or in these pages which are to be written, for the lesson of youth, for the models of generations to come, than to narrate the easy triumphs of happy minds who know how to tell us in the hours of distraction with beauty and grace, how beautiful and graceful is the nature of our pays, our sun, our moon, and the sweet waters that quench us and the forests that shade us and generate melancholy but intoxicating schisms in our soul."

Literary criticism was one of the relevant areas of activity of the Revista Mensal, aiming to form the taste of the public. This criticism was not restricted to purely literary aspects, as it also analyzed the moral quality of the productions since the ethical and civic education of the population was among the main concerns of the Parthenon. This activity as arbiters of taste and education extended to the theater, considered a moral school. Several members of the Parthenon ventured into the creation of dramaturgy, with works staged and published in the Revista Mensal. Although the Theatro São Pedro was already functioning and there was a theatrical tradition in the city, the Parthenonists were concerned about the low level of the works presented, which often had a circus character or were popular comedies. In the analysis of Cássia Silveira,

"[The theater] had the advantage of presenting to the spectators, theoretically, scenes from the lives of ordinary people and, emphasizing the naturalness of the staging. It also tried to show the Porto Alegre public the most appropriate behavior, gestures, dress, and language for each situation. Thus, the theater was an art form very much in tune with the kind of exemplary pedagogy of which the Parthenon was adept [...] The texts about theater, in general, established a hierarchy between a superior taste, patriotic and in harmony with civilization, and another "perverted", that preferred the little horses and the comic sketches. The superior taste would be linked to an equally superior morality, and should appreciate a picture of clean customs."

It was a publication that reflected the heterogeneous composition of society and the different degrees of preparation of its members, in which there were conservatives and liberals, monarchists and republicans, Catholics and Masons, romanticists and classicists, spiritualists and materialists, rationalists, evolutionists, scholastics and free thinkers. The magazine was the main publication of literary character in Rio Grande do Sul in the 19th century and one of the main vehicles of consecration for new authors. Its greatest contributions to the southern literary and cultural universe were the structuring of the regional literary system, the consolidation of literary criticism as a specific professional activity, autonomous and distinct from journalism. The publication has also been a vehicle for the dissemination of regionalist literature, and remained the best source for the study of the state's intellectuality of the late nineteenth century. For Guilhermino César, the magazine had the merit of constituting a regular and consistent space for the continued writing of literature that organizes itself thematically and aesthetically, and was a vehicle of central importance for the rescue of local traditions. In Vinícius Estima's synthesis:

"Continuing the task initiated by its predecessors O Guayba (1856) and Arcádia (1867), the magazine not only expanded the field of action of the literary press in the south but also began to promote the decentralization and unification of literature, to the extent that its circulation reached the various localities of the province. More than promoting the dissemination of authors and works, publishing short stories, novels, poetry, and other productions of those who, over the years, would establish themselves as the great intellectual mentors of the state, the wide dissemination of the magazine stimulates the constitution of a faithful and active reading public, formed both by collaborators and members of the institution itself, and by the creators of other groups and press vehicles that are formed from its influence."

According to some authors, such as Maria Eunice Moreira and Carlos Baumgarten, a divergence among members of the Parthenon would have led to the emergence of the journal Murmúrios do Guaíba, of ephemeral duration. For Mauro Póvoas, it was created to fill the vacuum left by the temporary interruption of the Revista Mensal in December 1869, both using identical structures in literary dissemination. Athos Damasceno lamented the brevity of its existence, comparing it in quality to the Revista Mensal.

== Politics, aesthetics, and regionalism ==
There was little unity of political purpose among the Parthenonists, but most were somewhat politicized and many were affiliated or had clear party connections. Some of their main representatives were Republicans, especially Apolinário Porto-Alegre, who wielded powerful influence over the group and would later be one of the founders of the Partido Republicano Rio-Grandense. Others, although coming from the ranks of the Liberal Party, such as Caldre and Fião, were in chorus with the Republicans in their complaints against the centralizing policy of the Imperial Government. The province had a militaristic and libertarian tradition, which had reached a climax in the Ragamuffin War (1835–1845), which arose from demands for greater autonomy and economic pressures, but soon evolved as a separatist movement, founding in part of the province an ephemeral independent republic. The bloody conflict was repressed by the Imperial Government, but it reached a conciliatory solution, reintegrating the dissidents into the constituted order. Given this, for decades the separatist and republican element was obscured in the official discourse of Rio Grande do Sul, but these associations were emphasized again during the flourishing of the Parthenon Litterario. Several factors intertwined for this phenomenon to occur. In the 1870s, the Republican movement had gained much momentum in Brazil, and in Rio Grande do Sul the revolution began to undergo positive re-readings, praising the courage of its promoters, now seen as heroes of the cause of freedom, in opposition to the monarchy, understood as a source of oppression.

Many of the Parthenonists were egresses of the extinct Historical and Geographical Institute of the province of São Pedro (IHGPSP), a branch of the Brazilian Historical and Geographical Institute, which had disappeared before the foundation of Parthenon. In that institution, the main interests were the articulation of regional historiography and its insertion in national historiography. Caldre e Fião, when the official orator of the IHGPSP, stated that the writing of history was the best way to collaborate in the progress of the nation, because it integrated in a single discipline all aspects of national life, allowing to form a coherent idea of its "civilizatory march", to identify its sources, traits and common goals and thus define its true identity. It was implicit in the IHGPSP program, as its contribution to the historiography of Brazil, to value the local element, and it planned to publish a series of biographies of Rio Grande do Sul's leaders, founding a gallery of local heroes, shown to the public as examples of civic virtue and moral greatness. The idea, however, did not succeed, due to the institute's early demise. Although the Parthenon's orientation was much more literary than scientific, the interest in history remained strong, the ideology of the IHGPSP was largely continued, and the project of the gallery of heroes materialized, as shown in the pages of the Revista Mensal.

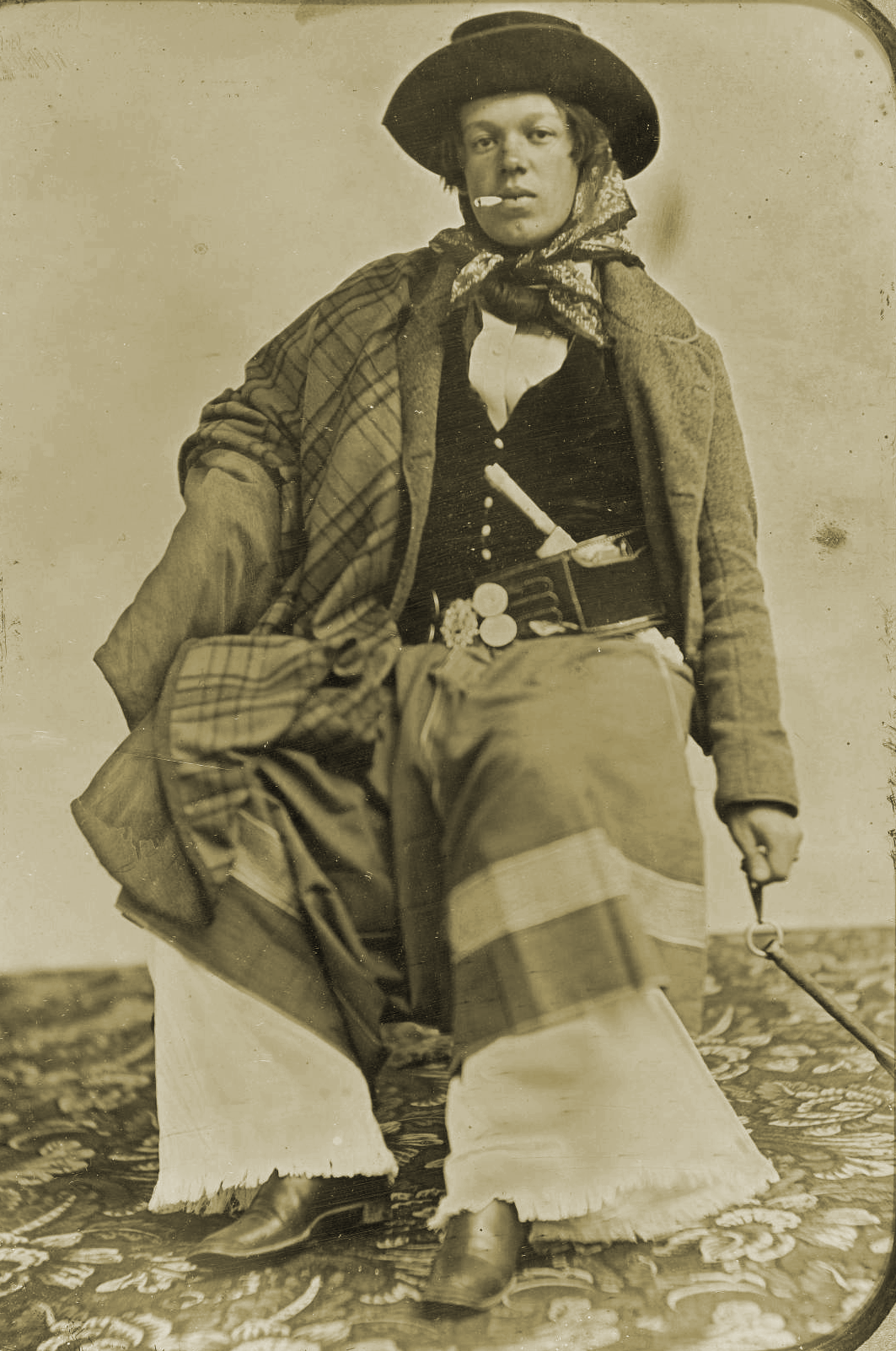
A 19th century gaucho in his typical costume

In this way, the context was established for the definition of the state's sociocultural identity, still embryonic and disarticulated, and for the formation of a literature of regionalist character, called gauchesca, whose first exponents are found among the members of the Parthenon, who divulge their writings in the Revista Mensal and publish independent works. The regionalist theme was not a novelty and had been in gestation for some time, although dispersed and inconsistent, but it was through Parthenon that regionalism would be converted into a definite program and would be cultivated literarily in a systematic way.

In this process, the image of the native to Rio Grande do Sul (gaúcho), was mythified as a synthesis of ideal values collected from the Ragamuffin imaginary and the folklore surrounding the Indians and the first settlers: independence, bravery, virility, honesty, and the alleged warrior and heroic character of the people was revered and emphasized to place them as the natural defender of the southern frontier of the Empire. As Luis Fernando Beneduzi stated, for them, the gaucho was "a kind of superman, invincible, indomitable, and who was always ready to fight to the last drop of blood for the just causes." Moreover, more than being concerned with the discovery and valorization of the originality of the local culture, there was a current that conceived the province as differentiated from the rest of Brazil, and therefore deserving of a literature that represented and distinguished it properly. In Guilhermino César's words:

"Through its first editors [of the Revista Mensal], the new current was attracted, above all, by the gaucho past, seeking to revive the guasca largado, the free man of the first times of the conquest, the rebels of 1835. [...] The imagination of Apolinário, Taveira Júnior, Múcio Teixeira, Caldre and Fião, Lobo da Costa, all those who had something to say about the people of the Pampeña, their sorrows, and joys, was directed to the frontier region, to its territory bathed in blood and heroic deeds. The ranch cowboy, heir of the "monarch of the coxilhas", the hero of the early days, the cowboy who was already a faded image of the other's freedom and daring, came to represent the writers, through the effect of a forgivable transposition, the brio, the haughtiness, the personal courage of the old lord of the savannahs. He occupied here the place which had fallen to the Indian and the Black in the liberal literature which since Macedo had bored the letters of the center and north of the country."

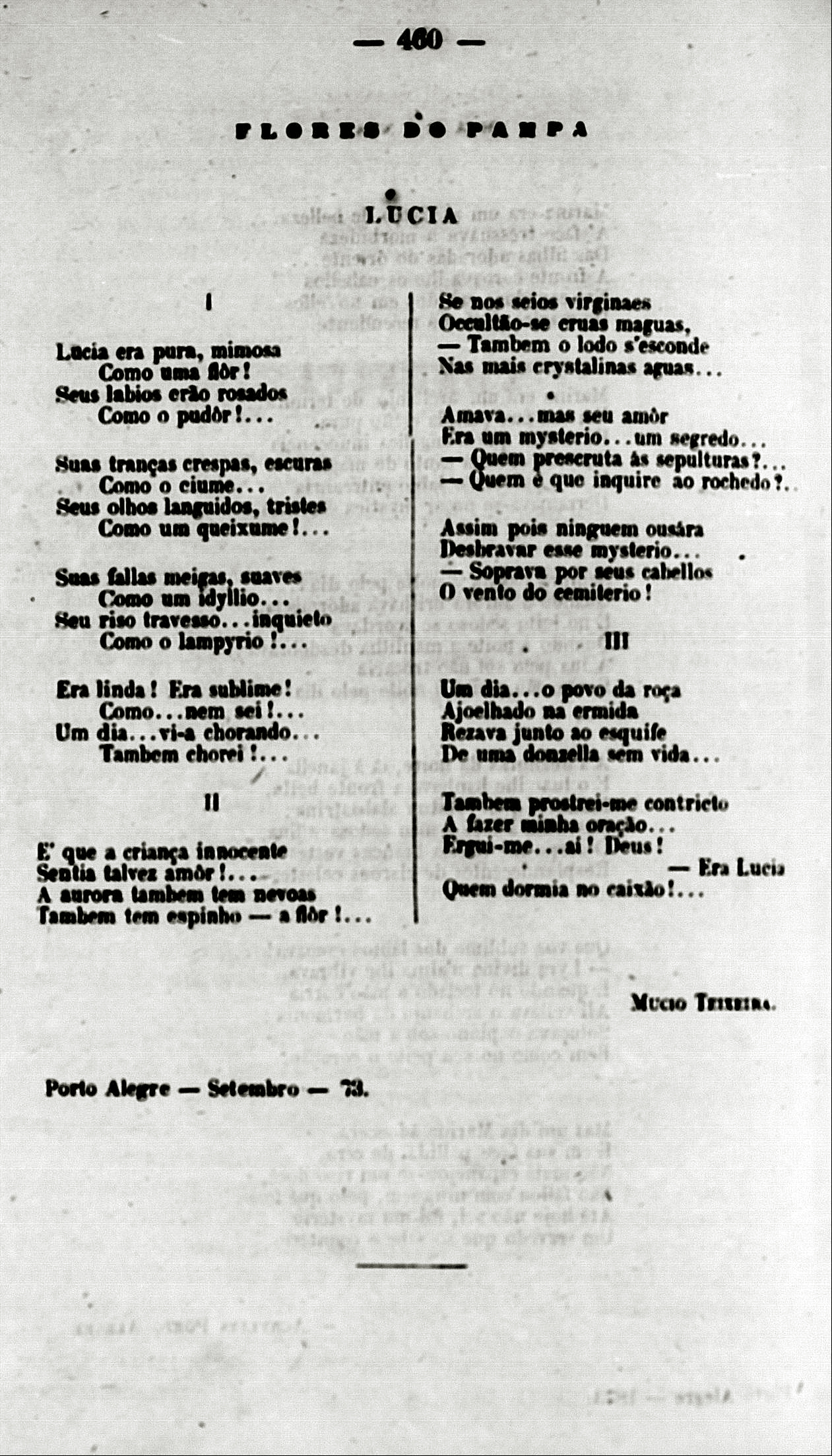
Poem "Lúcia", from the collection Flores do Pampa, by Múcio Teixeira, in Revista Mensal nº 10, October 1873

Contributing to this was a late flourishing in the south of literary Romanticism, a movement that had among its objectives to value the picturesque, the local, and the originality of regional and national traditions and identities, generally idealizing its characters. In the Parthenonist environment, regionalism was understood as a variant of the nationalism cultivated by Romantics in other parts of Brazil and as a path to achieving the autonomy they desired for the letters of the province. According to Flávio Loureiro Chaves, the emergence of regionalism in Rio Grande do Sul is due in part to the typically romantic interest in folklore, history, and linguistic research, problematizing the debate on nationalism and leading "to the conscious and programmatic valorization of the regional". For Regina Zilberman, the Parthenonists "accomplish in a finished way the major purpose of Brazilian Romanticism, namely, the poetic arrangement of the national desire to see itself reproduced in literature." In Carine Daniel's words, "Gaucho Romanticism is a kind of compromise between the mythical and the documentary. On the observed reality, landscape, types, customs, is invested the mythical visualization that transposes it to the plane of ideality."

In the pages of Revista Mensal appeared crônicas, poems, short stories, and novellas such as Serões de um Tropeiro by Bernardino dos Santos; Tapera, Feitiços duns Beijus, and O Vaqueano by Apolinário Porto-Alegre; A Filha do Capataz and Um Farrapo não se Rende by Vítor Valpírio; Pampeiro by Augusto Totta; and Flores do Pampa by Múcio Teixeira. However, critics like Athos Damasceno, Moysés Vellinho, Augusto Meyer, and Flávio Loureiro Chaves consider that in this phase the authors superficially appropriated a scenario and its characteristic types, undoubtedly giving a strong local flavor to their writings, but without transforming in depth the framework of literary forms and aesthetics of the period, still very dependent on imported models, being in this sense more traditionalist than revolutionary. Apolinário Porto Alegre himself would later recognize this condition: "To be worthy of America, I would have to restart all my studies and redo them from the ridge to the foundations, because I had concluded that I was nothing but a mannequin of Europe."

Besides having a strong popular appeal, with elements that could be identified with the common reader, romanticized regionalism served the interests of the dominant political class and the elite of the large estancieros, interconnecting with the issue of consolidating the identity of the Rio Grande do Sul, whose strengthening would help the political projection of the province on the national scene, and whose ideals of freedom and autonomy were in line with the republican current. In Juarez Fuão's interpretation, the literary romanticization of the gauchesca theme also had the advantage of broadening the scope of the primitive representations of the gaucho found among the first local historians, such as Cezimbra Jacques and Alfredo Varela, which had focused on scientific and historical aspects. With the transposition of local motifs to literature, where scientific truth is relativized, their message became more independent and more convincing. According to Tau Golin, the association between the power elite and the intellectual elite stimulated an exchange of favors: the intellectuals made the apology for the manly, warlike, and patriotic values of which the powerful thought themselves to be the possessors and guardians, and in return, they received support, prestige, and jobs in the civil service.

=== Education and morality ===
At the time of the Parthenon, education in the province was poorly organized and of low quality, even in the capital there was a context of precariousness recognized by the government. The first public classes in Porto Alegre were founded in 1820 with three teachers. By 1832, nine public elementary schools had been created, but only one was functioning. In the 1850s, a high school was founded in the capital, but it could not meet the demand and the quality necessary. Some private schools functioned, but also with poor results, and the complaints continued in the press and in the tribunes of the Provincial Assembly. To achieve a higher education, it was necessary to go to the academies in São Paulo and Rio de Janeiro, or abroad, accessible only to the wealthy families. In 1872, 75.94% of the Rio Grande do Sul population was illiterate, and the following year the Porto Alegre lyceum closed its doors.

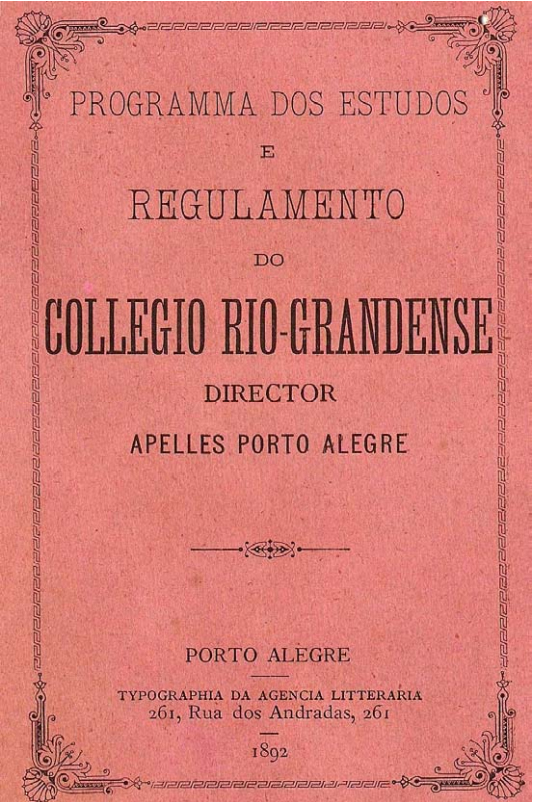
Program of studies and regulation of Colégio Rio-Grandense, founded in 1870 by Apolinário Porto-Alegre, Apeles Porto-Alegre and Vasco de Araújo e Silva

The Parthenon sought to expand the culture of the province by supporting or sponsoring several elementary and secondary schools in Porto Alegre, and offering night courses for adults. It created a library with 6 thousand volumes of important works, and a museum, one of the first in the province, with a collection of more than 4 thousand items divided into the sections of Mineralogy, Archaeology, Numismatics, Botany and Zoology. The Parthenon had the intention of founding an academy (university), which if it had materialized would have been the first in the province. It also encouraged the creation of libraries in several municipalities to expand the reading public. The society also developed plans for women's education on a large scale, which also did not materialize. Many of the Parthenon members were teachers and some founded prestigious schools, such as the Porto-Alegre brothers, Hilário Ribeiro, Vasco de Araújo, and Bibiano Francisco de Almeida.

In the view of the Parthenonists, providing good role models was one of the most important functions of literature. For some, religion could also be a good teacher, but there were divergent opinions about its role and usefulness, and the moral reputation of the Rio Grande do Sul's Catholic clergy of the time, in general, was low. Despite this concern, directed mainly at youth, in the ideology propagandized by the Parthenon and supported by the political and economic elites, Rio Grande do Sul was considered to be a granary of virtue and honor, and it was up to the young to imitate the example of the elders and the heroes.

A direct consequence of the perception of provincial literature as precarious and incipient, and of reading as dependent on outside authors, was the emphasis on autochthonous creation. Although reading the works of famous literati and philosophers from Brazil and abroad was encouraged, it was desired to make literary creation a routine practice in Rio Grande do Sul, which linked directly to the encouragement given to the education of the people as the basis on which that routine could be built.

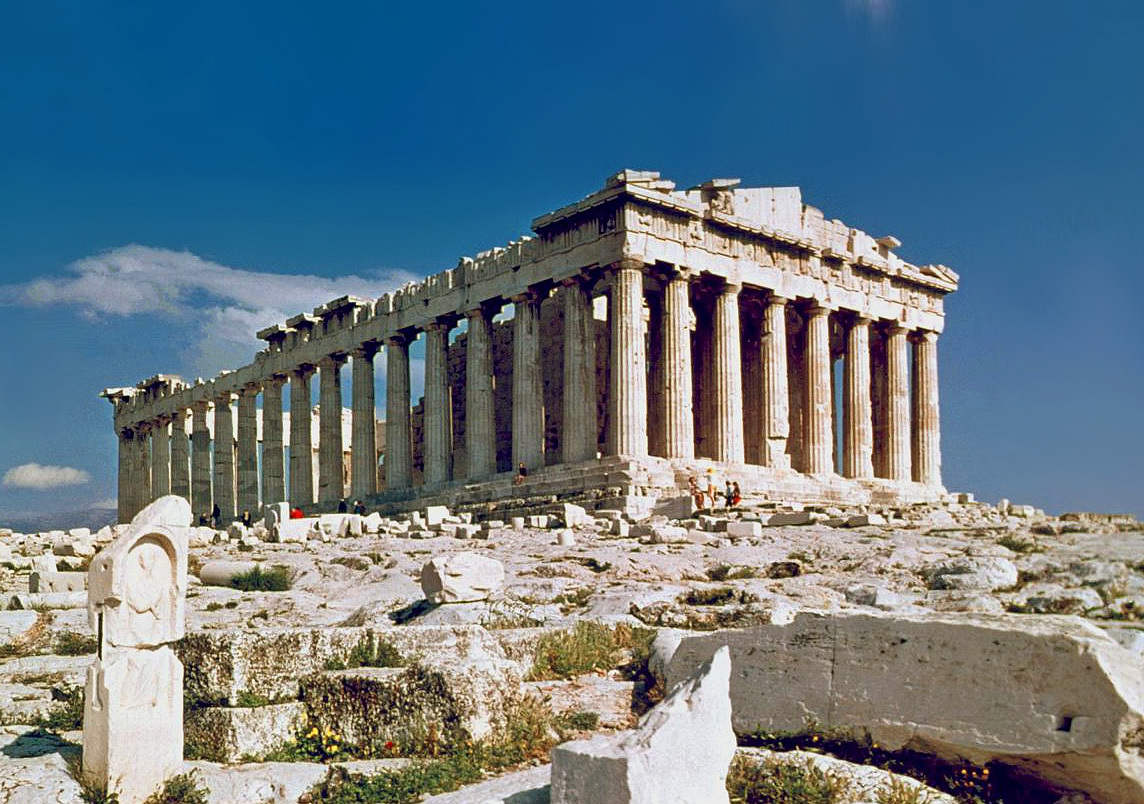
The Parthenon of Athens

The Parthenon's educational and civilizing goals were embedded in the very name of the society: The Parthenon, dedicated to the goddess Athena, is the name of the main building of the Acropolis of Athens, a city traditionally consecrated as one of the cradles of Western civilization. According to Schnorr & Rosa, "relating a literary association to a divinity recognized for its wisdom, intelligence, and prudence seems to do justice to the Parthenonists' project of fighting against the ignorance of the Rio Grande do Sul population, mostly composed of illiterate individuals. They tried to equate bravery in the military arts with the achievements of intellectual struggle, in a land that had neither libraries nor good schools (and no higher education), where prowess in arms and political tribunes had always won the highest praise. The Revista Mensal had many editorials and articles following the romantic taste of the time and the visions of its founders. An example of this discourse appears in the presentation of the Parthenon Program, written by Apolinário Porto-Alegre and published in the first issue of the magazine, from which some excerpts follow:

"June 18, 1868, marked a great epoch. A monument was erected. The foundations were laid under the auspices of a horrendous storm. It seemed that earth and heaven conspired against an idea in its sublime realization. There was everything to overcome, everything to create, without the flattering smile of hope, without the shimmering of the dawn, without a word of encouragement! The Alvans of the Parthenon were apostles of a belief, as were Cephas and Paul; they both had the same moral energy. The cult of letters is also a religion, and like every religion, it is not without a coliseum of martyrdom, a crown of thorns, and an apotheosis on the pencil that covers it. June 18th opened the literary cycle in the province, which until then, had not been able to gather a nucleus where the civilizing light could focus on the true, the good, and the beautiful."

=== Feminism ===
The integration of women into social life was one of the concerns of the Parthenon from the very beginning. At that time, the role of women was confined to the domestic sphere. They had little space in cultural activities; it was admissible for them to become teachers, and to possess artistic talents, such as singing and piano playing, taken as a sign of virtue and good education, but it was above all seen as a social ornament, suitable only for display in semi-public soirées. There was a large number of women engaged in labor and servile work, who also had little voice, but their participation in politics and intellectual activities was always discouraged. They were believed to have a passionate and sentimental nature, their sexuality was feared to escape control, and they should renounce any pretense of command. Women did not vote, and even the office of teaching, though encouraged as honorable and natural to women, did not escape prejudice. As Regina Zilberman put it,

"Assigning women to the teaching profession solved several problems: it justified the need to educate women; it solved the problem of the lack of manpower for teaching, a profession little sought after because it was poorly paid; there was no need to improve wages because women's wages should not be higher than men's. These reasons were covered by others, ideological in nature: The teacher was idealized, calling her a "mother" and thus suggesting that, in teaching, she remained faithful to her maternal nature; the professional element of teaching was denied because the classroom became a second home; teaching would not be a problem, because it was not work, but an extension of domestic chores, which held back the eventual emancipatory tendency that this activity might contain and did not contradict the sexist nature of Brazilian patriarchal society; and the woman-wife-mother association remained untouched, and also idealized, even when she was outside the home, earning the modest daily bread."

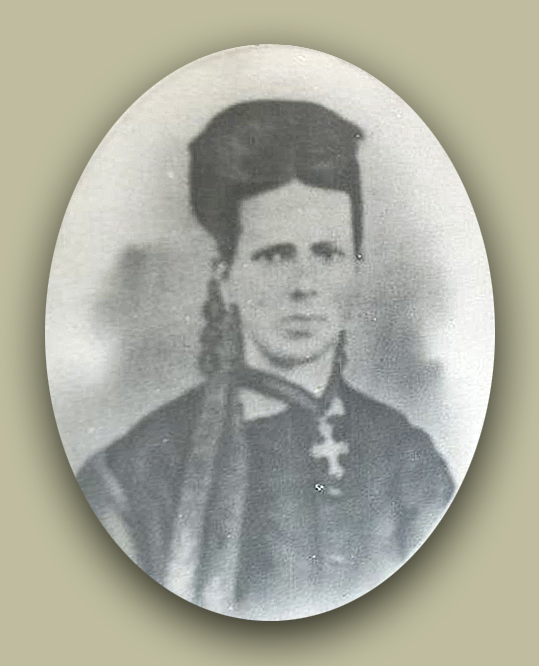
Luciana de Abreu, prominent member of the society, defender of the women's cause. Her portrait shows the gold cross received from the Parthenon in 1873, the highest distinction conferred by the society.

The Parthenonists did not have a consensual position on the feminine question, but in general recognized that women were abandoned and that their potential in the project of nation building was poorly used, believing that their poor participation in the community was due above all to a deficient education, focused only on domestic chores. To remedy this situation, following the position of other thinkers of the time, they proposed that an improved education would "refine their spirits" and direct their attention to moral and elevated themes, and would give them more conditions to assist their husbands, better prepare their children and form patriotic citizens dedicated to public interests. However, they still conceived the woman essentially as destined to the home and needing constant male guidance. An article by Apolinário Porto-Alegre in the Revista Mensal is an example of the male opinion about women in the late 19th century, when he invited them to read the magazine and enjoy the texts aimed at them:

"Yes, the magazine is for you sublime creatures, sworn enemies of the dry formulas of science and the algebra of principles. [Daughters of the poetic delight of God, passionate lovers by instinct and affinity of flowers, you want to see them bloom even in style. [...] When you want to understand the supreme architect of the world, it is certainly not in the wise dissertations of the doctors of the Church, nor in the muscular argument of philosophy, it is in the dawn that dawns, in the meadow that blooms and in the sky that glitters, it is rather in the melancholy melodies of Lamartine or Chateaubriand."

At least twelve women are recorded participating in the Parthenon's activities, among them Luísa de Azambuja, Amália dos Passos Figueroa and Revocata Heloísa de Melo, but the greatest exponent was Luciana de Abreu, who was reputed and protected by Caldre and Fião. She was the first woman to be admitted into a literary society in Brazil, and the first who went up on a public tribune to express her ideas. Orphaned, adopted by a humble family, and dedicated intensely to study, she became a poet, an orator, and a public teacher, being admired. She was in line with the Parthenonists' general educational proposal but went beyond it. She advocated the perfect equality of the genders in their capacities of intelligence and sensitivity, did not accept the submissive and domestic role reserved for them, complained about the inherent injustice of differential treatment, and advocated that women should be recognized for their leadership capacity and that they had the right to pursue higher education and freely govern their own lives by choosing the professions to which they felt inclined. Her speeches made a lively impression, according to reports of the time they resonated throughout the city.

However, the feminism of the Parthenonists ceased, and most of them were not willing to grant women such independence. Exceptions to this position were Bernardino dos Santos, who supported the full equalization between the genders, and in part Caldre e Fião, who proposed a broader educational model, having presented in 1854 to the Provincial Assembly a complete project for women's education where each woman would receive an education appropriate to her social position, and which included the creation of rural schools for poor girls where they would learn various trades, however the project was not adopted.

According to Cássia Silveira, after the initial enthusiasm, the Parthenonists ended up having disagreements about how to interpret Luciana's discourse, and in the end, her ideas and projects were overshadowed and forgotten, with the patriarchal model upheld by the majority, which included Apolinário, the influential leader of the group. Her example, however, marked the local culture, and today she is remembered as one of the pioneers of feminism in Rio Grande do Sul.

=== Abolitionism ===
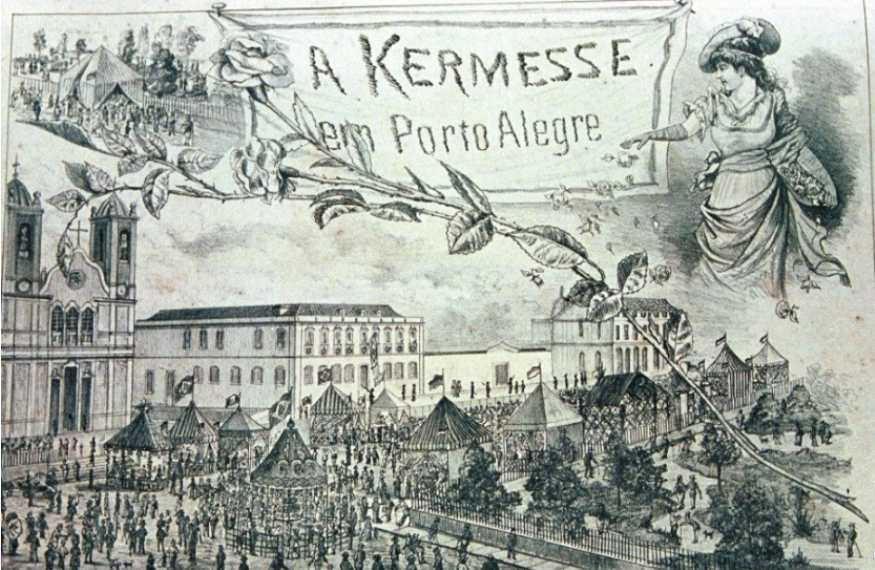
Illustration of the abolitionist kermesse promoted in 1884 by the Abolitionist Center of the Parthenon Litterario and by the City Council

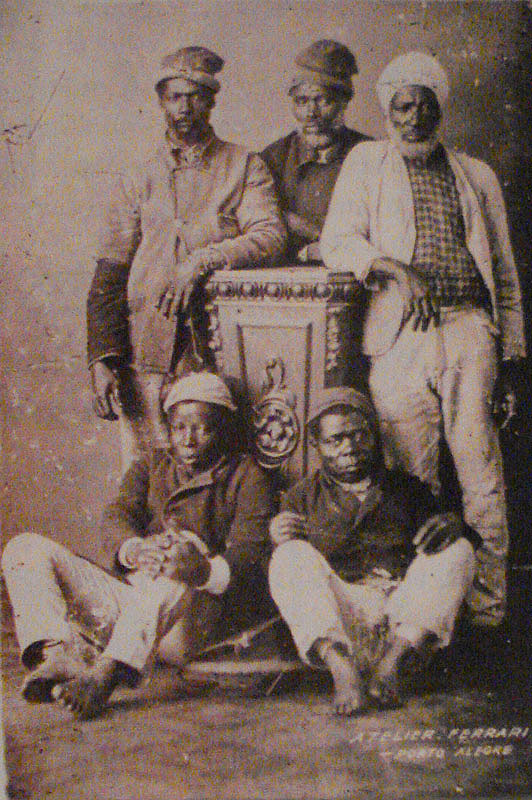
Blacks of Porto Alegre in 1884, after being liberated.

The Parthenon saw slavery as a crime against humanity and as a factor of delay in the civilizing process, proposing an economic-social model based on free labor and the education of former slaves. The society actively participated in the abolitionist movement, often using this banner as a pretext to attack the monarchy and its institutions, considered obsolete by them. In 1869, claiming to be inspired by the activities of the Parthenon, the Liberal Directory and the Count of Porto Alegre created the Liberating Society, which managed to raise funds for the liberation of at least 50 enslaved children. In September 1883, two members of the Parthenon, Joaquim de Salles Torres Homem and Júlio César Leal, who were members of the Abolitionist Section, founded a parallel entity, the Abolitionist Center of Porto Alegre, under the presidency of Colonel Joaquim Pedro Salgado, and took the lead in the campaign to free the slaves in the city. All political parties and the City Council supported the idea. They published articles in the press and organized the so-called "abolitionist journey", which took place between 12 and 18 August 1884, when commissions were created to go around the districts and suburbs of the capital persuading slave owners to free their slaves. The Abolitionist Center and the Chamber organized festivities between 6 and 8 September, with public ceremonies attended by the highest state and municipal authorities, civic parades, and kermesses aimed at raising funds.

However, there were serious disagreements between liberals, conservatives, and republicans on how liberation should be conducted, and the controversy extended into the Parthenon, but there was a general concern that without control the freedmen would fall into vagrancy and crime. Some members of the Parthenon, such as Alberto Coelho da Cunha and Apolinário Porto-Alegre, had a clear view on the matter, denouncing the prejudice and the cruel treatment blacks received, but in that context, the dominant tendency was to create a mechanism of conditional freedom, where freedmen would be obliged to render services to their former masters for up to seven years, although they were nominally free, because, as the province president Rodrigo de Azambuja Vilanova stated, "the great majority of freedmen will prefer to accompany their former benefactors, as in Rio Grande do Sul slavery was always a family institution, with the slave participating in all the advantages of the masters, to whom they must be tied today by the bonds of gratitude, and whose intelligence and experience they cannot do without. As a result of the campaign, all the slaves in the city were freed in September 1884, four years before the signing of the Lei Áurea.

=== Legacy ===
It is a consensus among historians that the founding of the Parthenon constituted a watershed in the literary-cultural field of Rio Grande do Sul, and that its activity was of great importance in its time, but this importance lies mainly in the foundation of literature of regionalist character and its generic role of cultural dynamizers, since the fruits of its specifically literary production, in aesthetic and artistic terms, even if following trends of the time, have been considered poor, with few exceptions. The Parthenon Literário was also at the forefront of the state abolitionist movement, carried out the relevant political and educational activity, and was a pioneer in the process of gender equalization by admitting and honoring women, albeit in a limited way.

For Athos Damasceno, the society promoted "the disentanglement of the entire institutional apparatus, for the benefit of Rio Grande do Sul's progress. And there we find the first signs of this new phase of our history"; "and not only will it act strongly in our midst, intervening in all spheres of the state's life, as it will be the starting point, the origin of new literary societies that, during the last thirty years of the century will be built, transmitting to each other the responsibilities of processing our culture, its meaning and its objectives". For Luciana Boeira it was "the most successful case of cultural association in Rio Grande do Sul in the 19th century"; according to Camila Vellinho, "no similar society had, until then, in any cultural center of the country, the importance or the duration of the Parthenon. Before the Academia Brasileira de Letras ("Brazilian Letter Society"), founded much later, the Literary Partenon was, without a doubt, the association that showed more vitality in the general framework of Brazilian literature"; for Flávio Loureiro Chaves its appearance was "a decisive landmark in the history of literature in Rio Grande do Sul", the same opinion by Regina Zilberman: "The effective beginning of the literature in Rio Grande do Sul coincides with the performance of those writers who took part in this association. [...] It is with the members of the Literary Partenon that the effort in favor of the strengthening of local literature, through the concretization of a circuit of production and consumption of works, is more successful." In Maria Eunice Moreira's synthesis,

"The proposition of effective mechanisms to achieve its goals, the discovery and dissemination of authors and works, the formation of a reading public not only in the capital, but also in the interior, associated with its long duration, gave the society a mythical role in the history of the Rio Grande do Sul literature. United by the republican ideals and agglutinated by common political principles, namely the republic and the abolition of slavery, the generation of the Literary Partenon, as this group of intellectuals became known, provoked a true revolution in a Province generally more shaken by war than by letters. The Literary Parthenon assumes a special function, for its members are men engaged with the political ideals of the ruling class of Rio Grande do Sul and, at the same time, it is still this group that produces and divulges the literary material capable of representing and conforming the yearnings of the community in which it is inserted. By organizing literary life in the extreme of Brazil, the Parthenonists collaborated to sustain the republican elite in power: artists in creation, politicians in ideology, but, above all, builders of the Rio Grande do Sul society, the Literary Partenon combined literary and political purposes, resulting in its importance for the understanding of a historical period and for the study of the birth of literature in the state. To read the narratives written by these early writers is, therefore, to read the initial pages of the formation of the state and the genesis of its literary process."

== Re-foundation ==
After 112 years, the Sociedade Parthenon Literário restarted its activities on 10 July 1997, from a group of intellectuals interested in continuing the works, with the encouragement of Serafim de Lima Filho, Cláudio Pinto de Sá, and Frei Aquylles Chiapin. The struggle for its headquarters continues, and it currently maintains an administrative office on Plácido de Castro Street; meetings are held monthly at the Legislative Assembly.

Legally, however, although the society is said to have restarted its activities in 1997, it was technically a re-founding. Like the old partners, the current ones are not bound or subordinated to any closed type of literature or artistic expression. They include jurists, poets, prose writers, visual artists, journalists, musicians, and actors. In 2016 it had 195 members. Lectures, informal conversations, soirées, seminars, and exhibitions are scheduled, and it also maintains several publications. The new Partenon maintains a strong connection with the old entity, but is not exclusively memorialistic and has established a commitment to the present and the future. According to president Benedito Saldanha, "the great cause of today's Partenon is the encouragement of reading and the formation of readers." The entity has already launched several collections, in addition to the traditional Revista ("Magazine") do Partenon Literário, now in book format. They are:

- Collection of the Literary Partenon, with commemorative editions;
- Collection of Authors Gathered, an anthology for members and non-members, aimed at valorizing emerging talents;
- Prata da Casa Collection, gathering works by members;
- Our Letters Collection, an anthology for members;
- Juridical Letters Collection;
- Parthenon Lectures Collection;
- Archive and History Collection, institutional anthologies to record the actions and acts of each administration;
- Special Edition Collection, covering productions created for ephemerides.

In 2005, the society was declared of public utility by the Municipal Chamber of Porto Alegre, and in 2008 the State Government enacted a law declaring it a State Historical and Cultural Heritage Site. In 2010, the City Council of Porto Alegre awarded it the Diploma Honra ao Mérito, honoring its role as a pioneering institution of Rio Grande do Sul literature and a landmark of the state's cultural formation. In 2016, on the initiative of the Círculo de Pesquisas Literárias and with the support of the Coordenação da Memória Cultural da Prefeitura de Porto Alegre, a replica of the plaque commemorating the centennial of its foundation was installed in Praça da Matriz. In 2018, in the celebrations of its 150th anniversary, it received homage from the Plenary of the Federal Senate.

== See also ==
- Historic and Geographic Institute of Rio Grande do Sul

== Bibliography ==
- Arriada, Eduardo (2007). "A Educação Secundária na Província de São Pedro do Rio Grande do Sul: a desoficialização do ensino público" (PDF). PUCRS. Doctorate.
- Baumgarten, Carlos Alexandre (1997). A crítica literária no Rio Grande do Sul: do Romantismo ao Modernismo (in Portuguese). EDIPUCRS / Instituto Estadual do Livro.
- Boeira, Luciana Fernandes (2009). Entre História e Literatura: a formação do Panteão Rio-Grandense e os primórdios da escrita de história do Rio Grande do Sul no século XIX (PDF) (in Portuguese). Mestrado. UFRGS.
- César, Guilhermino (1971). História da Literatura do Rio Grande do Sul (in Portuguese). Globo.
- Estima, Vinícius Marques (2009). "A história da literatura do Rio Grande do Sul, de Guilhermino Cesar: o inventário do período de formação da literatura sul-rio-grandense". Mestrado. FURG.
- Laitano, José Carlos Rolhano (2016). História da Academia Rio-Grandense de Letras (1901–2016) e Parthenon Litterario (1868–1885) (PDF) (in Portuguese). Metamorfose.
- Lima, Henrique Pereira (2012). "Dueto em Três Vozes: discursos historiográficos e estéticos do gaúcho em O Laçador e El Gaucho Oriental" (PDF). Mestrado. UFPF.
- Menez, Alexsandro R (2015). "O "Inolvidável Polígrafo": Regionalismo Literário Gaúcho e Nacionalismo Brasileiro em Apolinário Porto Alegre (1869–1879)" (PDF). Mestrado. PUCRS.
- Póvoas, Mauro Nicola (2017). Uma História da Literatura: periódicos, memória e sistema literário no Rio Grande do Sul do século XIX (in Portuguese). Buqui. pp. 102–104.
- Silveira, Cássia Daiane Macedo da (2008). Dois pra lá, dois pra cá: o Parthenon Litterario e as trocas entre literatura e política na Porto Alegre do século XIX (in Portuguese). Mestrado. UFRGS. p. 65.
- Tomasi, Greici (2006). "Leituras na Fronteira: um estudo sobre a relação entre literatura e história nas obras de Caldre e Fião". UCS. Masters Thesis: 65–66.
