= Margarida Teresa da Silva e Orta =

Brazilian-born Portuguese writer (1711–1793)

Margarida Teresa da Silva e Orta (1711–1793) (often written as Teresa Margarida da Silva e Orta) was a Brazilian-born author of the Enlightenment era. She is considered the first female novelist in the Portuguese language. She initially published under the pseudonym Dorotéia Engrassia Tavareda Dalmira, which is a perfect anagram of her name.

== Biography ==
She was born in São Paulo, in the Portuguese colony of Brazil. Her mother was a wealthy Brazilian, Catarina de Orta, and her father was Portuguese, José Ramos da Silva, knight of the Order of Christ, purveyor of the Lisbon Mint. He had come to Brazil at age 12 in 1695 to work as a servant, eventually becoming a successful businessman. According to Tristão de Ataíde, the family was one of the most significant in Brazil. At the time of their marriage, José was already one of the richest men in São Paulo, owner of properties in the city as well as gold and diamond lands in Minas Gerais.

At the age of six, she moved with her parents to Portugal, where she remained for the rest of her life. Upon the family's return to Lisbon, Silva e Orta and her sister studied at Convento das Trinas, in preparation for joining a religious order. Instead, she married Pedro Jansen Moller van Praet with whom she had twelve children. She was fluent in Portuguese, French and Italian.

After her husband died, when she was just 42 years old, Silva e Orta was accused of lying to King José about her youngest son's secret relationship with a wealthy woman. As a result, by order of the Marquis of Pombal, Silva e Orta was held captive for seven years in the Monastery of Ferreira de Aves. In 1777, she was released and moved in with her brother-in-law, Joaquim Jansen Moller.

She died in 1793, at the age of eighty.

== Works ==
Her chief work is Maximas de Virtude e Formosura (Maxims of Virtue and Beauty), published in Lisbon in 1752 and reissued in 1777 under the title Aventuras de Diófanes. Based on Fénelon's novel Télémaque, it contains a criticism of royal absolutism, recommending instead that the King should follow a policy of enlightened paternalism. Early printings of some of her works featured an incorrect author; instead of Silva e Orta, they show the name of a man.

=== Handwritten ===
- Theresa Margarida da Silva e Horta, locked up in the Ferreira monastery, sends her just tears to the heavens in the following epic-tragic poem, Novena of the Patriarch St. Benedict
- Dedicatory letter to Abbess D. Anna Josepha of Castel-Branco

=== Printed ===
- Maxims of virtue, and ferocity with which Diofanes, Clyminea, and Hemirena Principes of Thebes overcame the toughest challenges of misfortune, Lisbon, Officina Miguel Manescal da Costa, 1752.
- Adventures of Dióphanes, Imitating the very wise Fenelon on his Journey to Telemachus
- Adventures of Dióphanes, imitating Sapientissimo Fenelon on his Telemachus Journey by Dorothea Engrassia Tavareda Dalmira. Its true author Alexandre de Gusmão
- History of Diophanes, Clymenea and Hemyrena, Princes of Thebes. Moral History written by human Lady Portuguese, Lisbon, Typographia Rollandiana,

=== Posthumous works ===
In the book Obra Reunida, from the Revisões Series, published in 1993, in addition to Maxims of Virtue and Formosura (1752), there are also the texts she wrote in the cloister of the Monastery of Ferreira de Aves. They are the Epic-tragic Poem, the Novena of the patriarch São Bento and the Petition that the prey makes to Queen N. Senhora. In the same collection, there are testimonies from her first critics, such as Rodrigo de Sá and Barbosa Machado, and critical texts by Ernesto Ennes, Tristão de Athayde and Rui Bloem.
