= Francisca Senhorinha da Motta Diniz =

Brazilian teacher

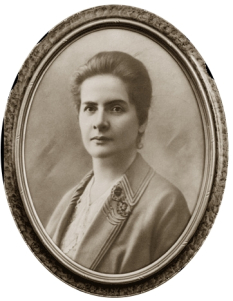
Francisca Senhorinha da Motta Diniz

Francisca Senhorinha da Motta Diniz, also known as Francisca Diniz (? in São João del Rey, Minas Gerais – ? in Campanha, Minas Gerais), was a Brazilian teacher who played an important role in feminism in the 1890s. She founded a newspaper entitled O Sexo feminino. Francisca Diniz saw the changes happening in Brazil when it came to the industrial revolution and suffrage.

== Overview ==
The weekly newspaper was aimed toward promoting the need for education of women and alerting them that their enemy was ignorance imposed by male culture. She argued that Brazilian problems would be solved with a greater and more effective participation of women in society. The most violent and strenuous activities should be left for men and the lighter and more intellectual ones for women.

The newspaper was an early advocate of female suffrage. With the proclamation of the Republic and the end of the Monarchy, only literate men were allowed to vote. In protest against segregation, the journal changed its name to O Quinze de Novembro do Sexo Feminino, bringing a broader perspective to the discussion of suffrage.

Education was a huge topic of her newspaper journal and she was supporting the emancipation of women's rights to property and education. She worked to make sure men saw that women were also capable of making political choices and supporting the right for women to vote. Francisca Diniz also believes that women have superiority over men but that men are the physically stronger specimen. She had taken on a strong idol role in Brazil for women and to empower women. She embraced the "powers" that society so generally put upon women and said that women have those said abilities, such as being mothers, to be seen as gifts.

A lot of her work and writing about her and her work are in the foreign tongue, Portuguese.

== See also ==
- List of feminists
- Women's suffrage
- Feminism
