= Adélia Josefina de Castro Fonseca =

Former Brazilian Poet (1827-1920)

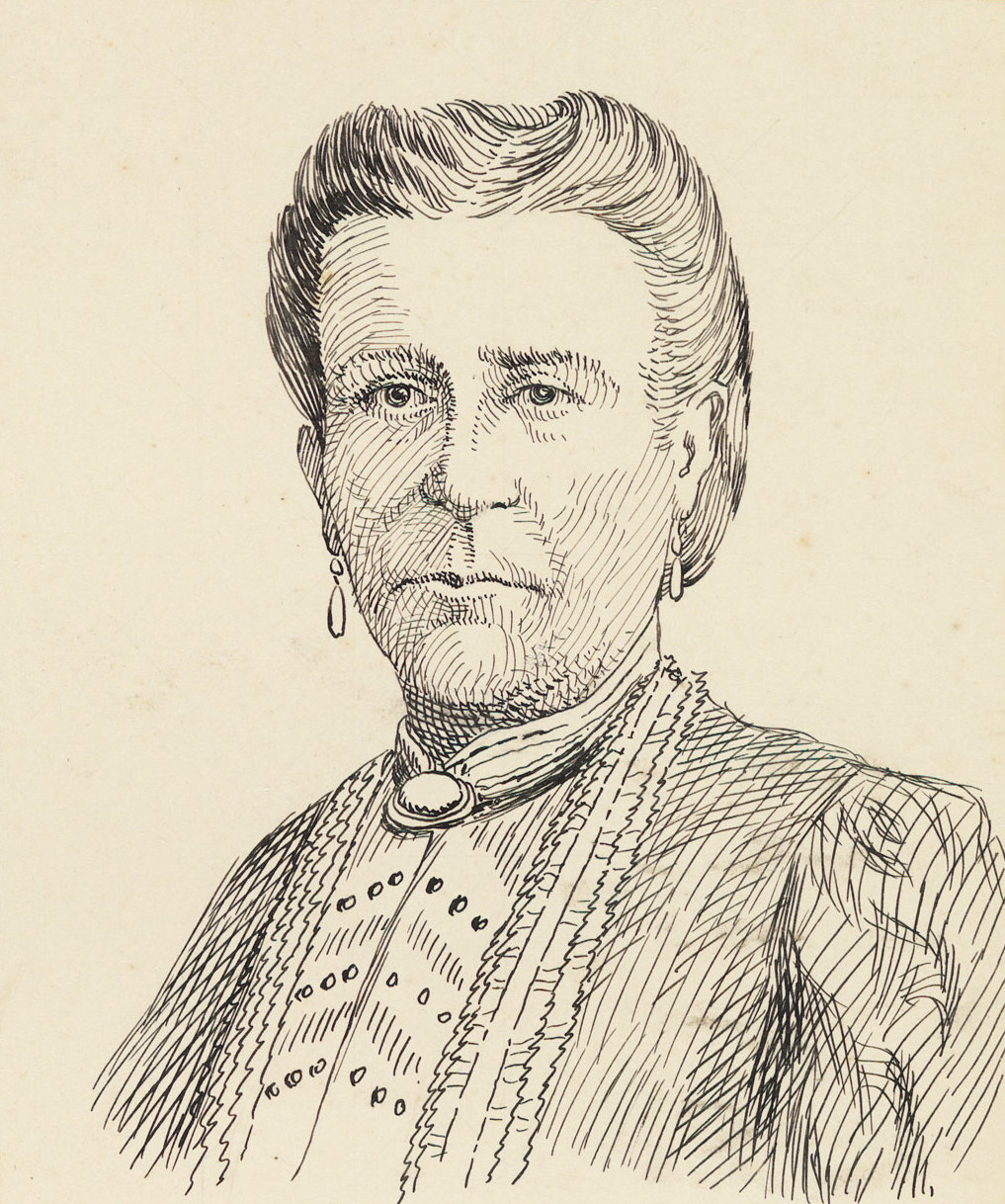
Adélia Fonseca

Adélia Josefina de Castro Fonseca (24 November 1827 in Salvador, Bahia – 9 December 1920 in Rio de Janeiro) was a Brazilian poet. Her parents were Justiniano de Castro Rebello and Adriana de Castro Rebello. She married Inácio Joaquim da Fonseca. She published her poems in newspapers and books, and was a constant collaborator with the Almanaque de lembranças luso-brasileiro.

Towards the end of her life, she entered the Convent of Santa Teresa, in Rio de Janeiro, adopting the name of Mother Maria José de Jesús.

== Selected works ==
- Echos de minha alma: poesias, 1865

== Sources ==
- Coletânea de poetas Bahianos. (1951) Aloysio de Carvalho y Editora Minverva, page 272. (in Portuguese)
