= Josefina Álvares de Azevedo =

Brazilian journalist (1851–1913)

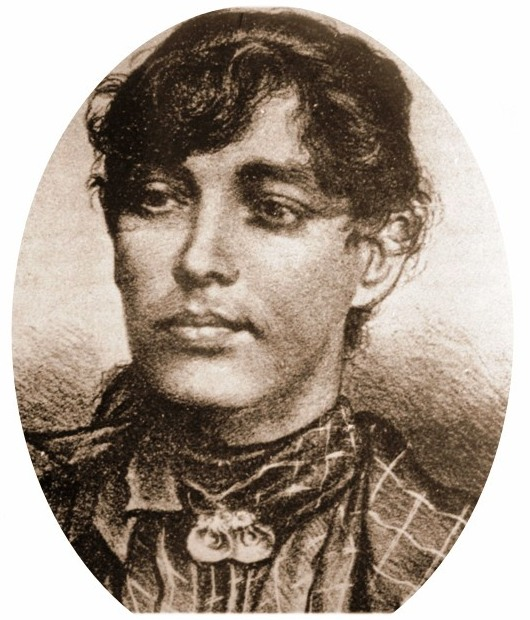
Josefina Álvares de Azevedo

Josefina Álvares de Azevedo (Note: Josephina Álvares de Azevedo, at the time's spelling) (5 May, 1851 — 2 September 1913) was a Brazilian journalist, writer and early feminist She was an advocate for the Brazilian women's right to vote, writing newspapers, theater plays and poems.

According to Augusto Blake's Dicionário Bibliográfico Brasileiro, Josefina was born in Itaboraí and was a half-sister of the writer Álvares de Azevedo. She, however, said she was Azevedo's cousin and that she was born in Recife, where she lived until she was twenty-six years old. In 1877, she moved to São Paulo, where she founded in 1888 the newspaper A Família. The following year she moved to Rio de Janeiro, and kept publishing until 1897, when she had to interrupt it, resuming the newspaper in 1898.

Azevedo defended the education of women as an essential tool for their emancipation. She sought to extend the circulation of his newspaper throughout the country, traveling to the North and Northeast regions of Brazil. She promoted the feminine suffrage in the 1890 article O Direito ao Voto (The Right to Vote), a year after the proclamation of the Brazilian Republic. She wrote in the same year the comedy O Voto Feminino, (Women's Vote), staged in the Teatro Recreio Dramático.

Still in 1890, she gathered a series of texts that she had published in the newspaper, including poetry, and edited them in the compilation Retalhos.

== A Família ==
In 1877, Azevedo publishes the newspaper A Família (The Family). The journal's main purpose was to address women's education, but with the political transition experienced by Brazil, it shifted to assert women's rights and to have their voices represented on political issues and to vote, for example. After six months in São Paulo, the newspaper began to be published in Rio de Janeiro, since Josefina moved there. According to Karine da Rocha, coordinator of the Center for Research in Women, Literature and Society (Federal University of Pernambuco), this change took place with the intention of a greater acceptance of the newspaper due to its proximity to the Court.

The newspaper ran uninterruptedly until the year 1897, always wanting to give voice to women in matters such as education and politics. After a year, in 1898, it returns to circulate, which can be concluded by the thank-you note of the magazine A Mensageira

In A Família's first edition, Josefina says that the press can serve as a valve that can awaken an individual's conscience. Thus, through the newspaper, it was intended to show that there was no reason for the differentiation that existed at the time between men and women, with women considered inferior when compared to men.

In that same edition, it is still possible to see the dissatisfaction, both of Josefina and other journalists, regarding the division that existed at the time. According to her, the two principles that existed were strength and order, where she delegates the first to men and the second to women. In this way, the female sex should also be responsible for the coordination of society, since they, unlike men, were able to coordinate the homes.

With the proclamation of the Brazilian Republic in November 1889, the discourse on women's right to vote became even stronger, since greater equality was expected in this new political model. However, women's rights in this respect have not changed, causing Josefina to criticize this fact in the 7 December 1889 issue, speaking of injustice and reiterating that the only aspect to be taken into account should be intellectual capacity.

== O voto feminino ==
In 1890, Josefina Alvares de Azevedo wrote the play O voto feminino, which, before being staged, was advertised in some issues of A Família. The comedy's intention, as well as that of the newspaper, was to give voice to women in the Brazilian political scene, especially in the issue of the right to vote. Women such as Isabel de Mattos Dillon, who did succeed in voting once, were denied the right to vote even though the law did not specifically exclude them. The play was shown at the Teatro Recreio Dramático, at the time, one of the most popular in Rio de Janeiro.

The play took place at the home of a couple who received their son and son-in-law for dinner. Besides them, there is another couple (the maid and her husband) and a single man. They await the "result of a consultation submitted to a certain Minister regarding the enactment of the law of the female vote."

Despite being praised by the press before it even debuted, the play was staged only once. After that, it was published two other times: in the footers of the newspaper A Família and also in book form.
