= Amália dos Passos Figueiroa =

Brazilian journalist

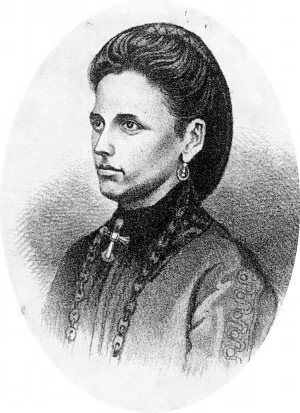
- Born: August 31, 1845; Porto Alegre, Brazil
- Died: September 24, 1878 (aged 33); Porto Alegre, Brazil
- Occupations: Poet, journalist

Amália dos Passos Figueiroa (August 31, 1845 – September 24, 1878) was a Brazilian poet and journalist.

== Biography ==
Figueiroa was born in Porto Alegre to the Portuguese journalist Manoel dos Passos Figueiroa and the Brazilian Ana Cândida da Rocha Figueiroa. Her father died when she was four years and she became a depressed and melancholic adolescent. However, due to her sensibility, during this period she started to write lyrical poems for the local newspapers, including A Reforma (The Reform). A Romantic, she had among her influences Gonçalves Dias, José de Alencar, Alvares de Azevedo and Casimiro de Abreu.

At 24 she left her hometown to go to Rio de Janeiro along with her brother, José, an engineer and professor at the Polytechnic School of Federal University of Rio de Janeiro. There, she was encouraged by some intellectuals of the Imperial Court, who appreciated her work, to publish poems in the local A Luz (The Light) and Pelotas' Progresso Literário (Literary Progress). After a period of happiness in Rio she returned with her brother to Porto Alegre where her memories persecuted here.

Her joy was recovered when she met the poet and goldsmith Carlos Ferreira during a literary event. Ferreira became the "center of her life", according to a biographer, and they soon got engaged. Her poetry style was affected by that relationship; the wistful love, she once wrote about, turned into a vivid love in her poems, in which she revealed her inner feelings. During this period she entered the Sociedade Partenon Literário (Parthenon Literary Society), a group whose main ideas were the Romanticism and regionalism. She published works on Partenon's monthly journal and local newspapers to critical and public acclaim.

Her works were not limited to love poems, though; Figueiroa wrote nationalistic pieces inspired by the Paraguayan War (1864–1870) that she considered as a sovereignty-driven enterprise. She also supported the Abolitionist movement and women's right through her poems. In 1872, she published her only book, Crepúsculos (Twilights), through the printing office of Jornal do Comércio (Commerce Journal).

She was happier than ever until the day Pedro II and Teresa Cristina came to Porto Alegre's São Pedro Theatre to receive a homage. During the reception, Ferreira declaimed a poem that impressed the emperor who offered to pay his studies in Rio de Janeiro. Ferreira accepted to Figueiroa's second great disappointment after the death of her father. At first, she was reluctant to believe but when it became clear she locked herself in her house and did not want to eat. She went through mental alienation and later she was diagnosed with tuberculosis. Aged 33, she died from tuberculosis on September 24, 1878.

A street is named after her in the neighborhood Partenon and she is the patroness of the sixth chair of Feminine Literary Academy of Rio Grande do Sul.

=== Death ===
Amália's future seemed very happy, until the day D. Pedro II came to visit Porto Alegre. An artistic performance was prepared for the emperor and his wife, D. Teresa Cristina, at the São Pedro Theater. After the play, a poetry recital followed, and Carlos Ferreira, Amália's fiancé, took to the stage to declare a poem in honor of the imperial couple. Admired by the young man's talent, Pedro II wanted to meet him in person and offered him a study trip to Rio de Janeiro, paid for by the Court. Ferreira promptly accepted the invitation and gave up the engagement.

Carlos Ferreira's abandonment was the second shock in Amália's life - the first was the death of her father. The poet then lost hope of finding happiness again and began to waste away physically and emotionally, until she reached a state of mental alienation. She died young, at the age of thirty-three, of tuberculosis.

In 1882, two years after her death, two poems by Amália Figueiroa, As Duas Estrelas and Luz, were chosen to be part of the collection Almanaque de Senhoras, published in Lisbon, Portugal.
