= Partenon =

Neighborhood in Porto Alegre, Brazil

Coordinates: 30°03′S 51°12′W

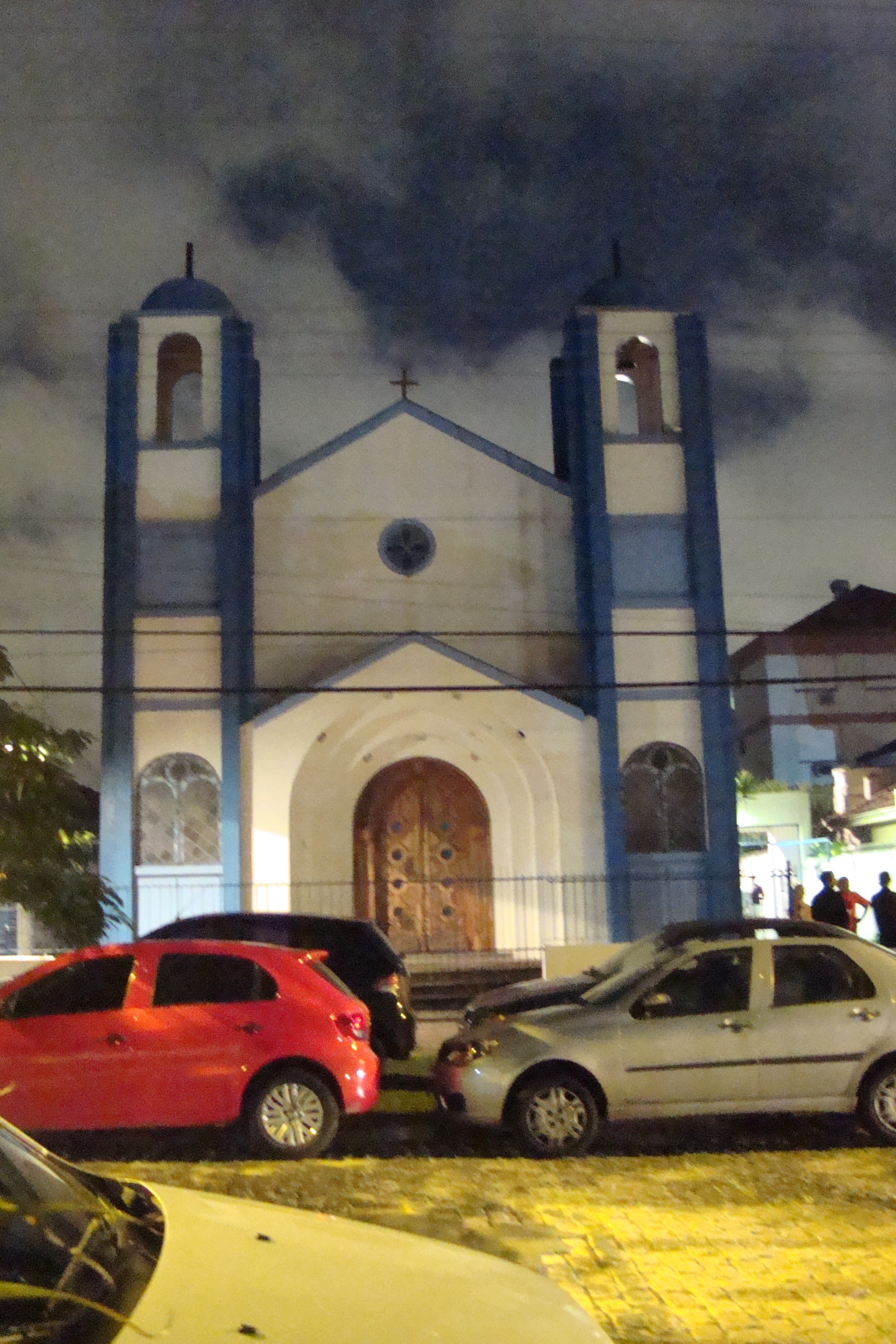
Greek Orthodox Church in Partenon.

Partenon (literally Parthenon in Portuguese) is a neighbourhood in the city of Porto Alegre, the state capital of Rio Grande do Sul, Brazil. It was created by Law 2022 from December 7, 1959.

Partenon was named after the Parthenon Literary Society, officially founded in 1868 by a group of writers and intellectuals. In its area, there are two important places nowadays: the São Pedro Psychiatric Hospital, inaugurated in 1884, and the central campus of the Pontifical Catholic University of Rio Grande do Sul, one of the best private universities in the country.

It is considered a middle and lower class neighborhood in Porto Alegre, and little slums can be found here.
