= Maria Angélica Ribeiro =

Brazilian playwright (1829–1880)

- Born: Maria Angélica de Sousa Rego; 5 December 1829; Paraty, Angra dos Reis, Brazil
- Died: 9 April 1880 (aged 50); Rio de Janeiro, Brazil

Maria Angélica de Sousa Rego, known as Maria Angélica Ribeiro (5 December 1829 – 9 April 1880) was a Brazilian playwright. She was the first Brazilian woman to have a play staged in Brazilian theater.

She was the daughter of Maria Leopoldina de Sousa Rego and Marcelino de Sousa Rego. At the age of 14, she married her drawing teacher, João Caetano Ribeiro.

She wrote about twenty plays.
