= Auta de Souza =

Brazilian poet

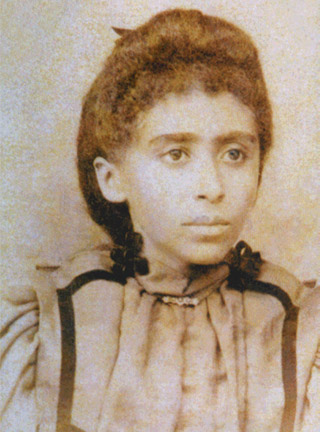
- Born: 12 September 1876; Macaíba, Rio Grande do Norte, Brazil
- Died: 7 February 1901 (aged 24); Natal, Rio Grande do Norte, Brazil
- Occupation: Poet
- Writing career
- Notable work: Horto
- Literary movement: Romanticism, Symbolism

Auta de Souza (12 September 1876 — 7 February 1901) was a Brazilian poet. She wrote Romantic poems, with some Symbolistic influence.

Souza published only one book in her lifetime, Horto. Folklorist Luís da Câmara Cascudo deemed her the greatest mystical poet in Brazil.

== Life ==
Souza was born in Macaíba, daughter of Elói Castriciano de Souza and Henriqueta Leopoldina Rodrigues.

She became an orphan when she was three, with her mother's death by tuberculosis; her father died of the same disease the next year. Souza was then raised by her maternal grandmother in Recife, where she took particular classes. When she was eleven, she was enrolled at the Colégio São Vicente de Paula, a Catholic school run by Vicentin nuns. Souza left school when she was fourteen because of a tuberculosis diagnostic, but then she became an autodidact.

At eighteen, she began to collaborate with the magazine Oasis, and at twenty wrote for A República, a larger circulation newspaper which gave her visibility to other regions' press. Her poems were published in Rio de Janeiro newspaper O Paiz.

The following year she would write assiduously for Natal newspaper A Tribuna, and her verses were published together with several writers from Brazil northeast. Between 1899 and 1900, she signed his poems under the pseudonyms "Ida Salúcio" and "Hilário das Neves". Several of her poems were adapted as lyrics for modinhas - popular songforms of nineteenth century Brazil.

In 1900 she published her only book, Horto, prefaced by Olavo Bilac.

=== Death ===
Auta de Souza died on 7 February 1901, in Natal, of tuberculosis. She was buried at Cemitério do Alecrim, but in 1904 her remains were moved to the family grave, at the church of Our Lady of Conception, in her birth city, Macaíba.
