= Henriqueta Lisboa =

Brazilian poet

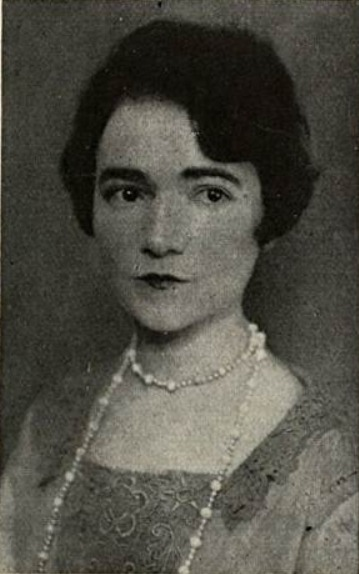
- Portrait of Henriqueta Lisboa, 1926
- Born: July 15, 1901; Lambari, Minas Gerais, Brazil
- Died: October 9, 1985 (aged 84); Belo Horizonte, Minas Gerais, Brazil
- Occupations: writer, literature teacher
- Writing career
- Language: Portuguese

Henriqueta Lisboa (Lambari, 15 July 1901– Belo Horizonte, 5 October 1985) was a Brazilian poet and professor. She was awarded the Prêmio Machado de Assis for her lifetime achievement by the Brazilian Academy of Letters. She is famous for her well-chosen words to create powerful poems. Her early lyrics deal with traditional poetic themes, while her later poems like Echo, she mysteriously magnifies the effect of a single image.

Lisboa taught literary history at the School of Biblioteconomy of the Federal University of Minas Gerais as well as Hispano-American and Brazilian literature at the Faculty of Philosophy, Sciences and Letters Santa Maria, now part of the Pontifical Catholic University of Minas Gerais.

Her works were read by Mario de Andrade, Manuel Bandeira, Carlos Drummond de Andrade, Cecilia Meireles, and Gabriela Mistral. Several of her poems were translated into other languages: English, French, Spanish, Latin and German. Some of them below:

- The echo– translated by Blanca Lobo Filho
- Ein Dichter war im Krieg– translated by Blanca Lobo Filho
- Palmier des plages– translated by Véra Conradt

== Bibliography ==
- Fogo fátuo, poetry, 1925
- Enternecimento, poetry, 1929
- Velório, poetry, 1936
- Prisioneira da noite, poetry, 1941
- O menino poeta, poetry, 1943 (first edition)
- O menino poeta, poetry, 1975 (special edition)
- O menino poeta, poetry, 1984
- A face lívida, poetry, 1945
- Flor da morte, poetry, 1949
- Almas femininas da América do Sul, essay, 1928
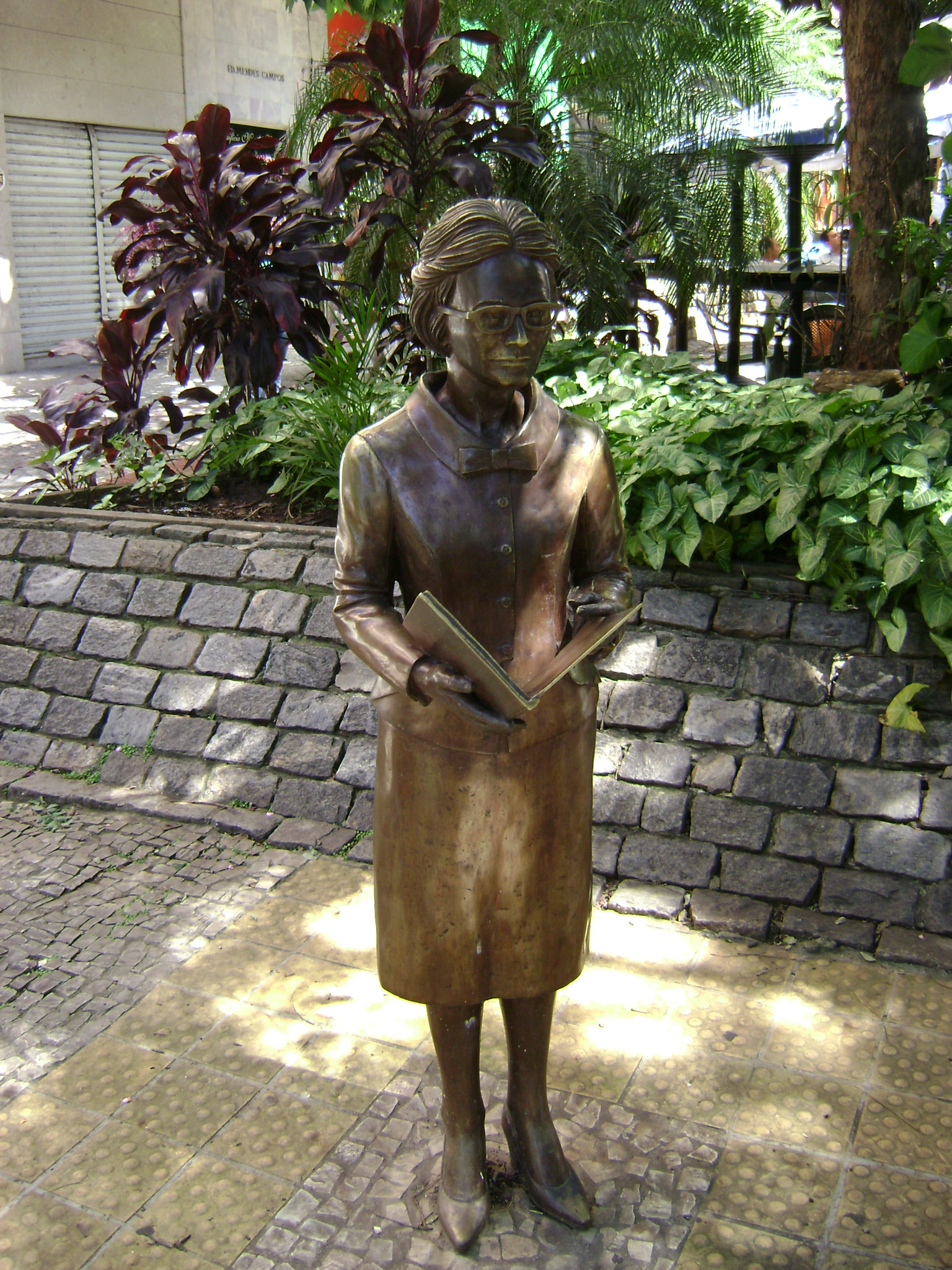
  Statue of the poet in the Savassi Plaza, Belo Horizonte
- Alphonsus de Guimaraens, essay, 1945
- A poesia de Ungaretti, essay, 1957 A poesia de "Grande sertão: veredas", essay, 1958
- Reflexões sobre a história: discurso, essay, 1959
- Antologia poética para an infância e a juventude, compilation, 1961
- Antologia poética para an infância e a juventude, compilation, 1966
- Literatura oral para an infância e a juventude. Lendas, contos e fábulas populares no Brasil, compilation, 1968
- Contos de Dante, translation, 1969
- Poemas escolhidos de Gabriela Mistral, translation, 1969
- Henriqueta Lisboa: poesia traduzida, translation, 2001
