= Frank McCann =

American historian

- Born: Francis Daniel McCann; 15 December 1938
- Died: 2 April 2021 (82 years old)
- Occupations: Historian, university professor

Francis Daniel McCann (December 15, 1938 – April 2, 2021), better known as Frank McCann, was a historian, and an American Brazilianist expert in Brazilian military history. He was a professor emeritus at the University of New Hampshire.

Emeritus Professor of International Relations at the Universidade Federal Fluminense (UFF), he was called "a great American and a great friend of Brazil".

== Military Brazilianist ==
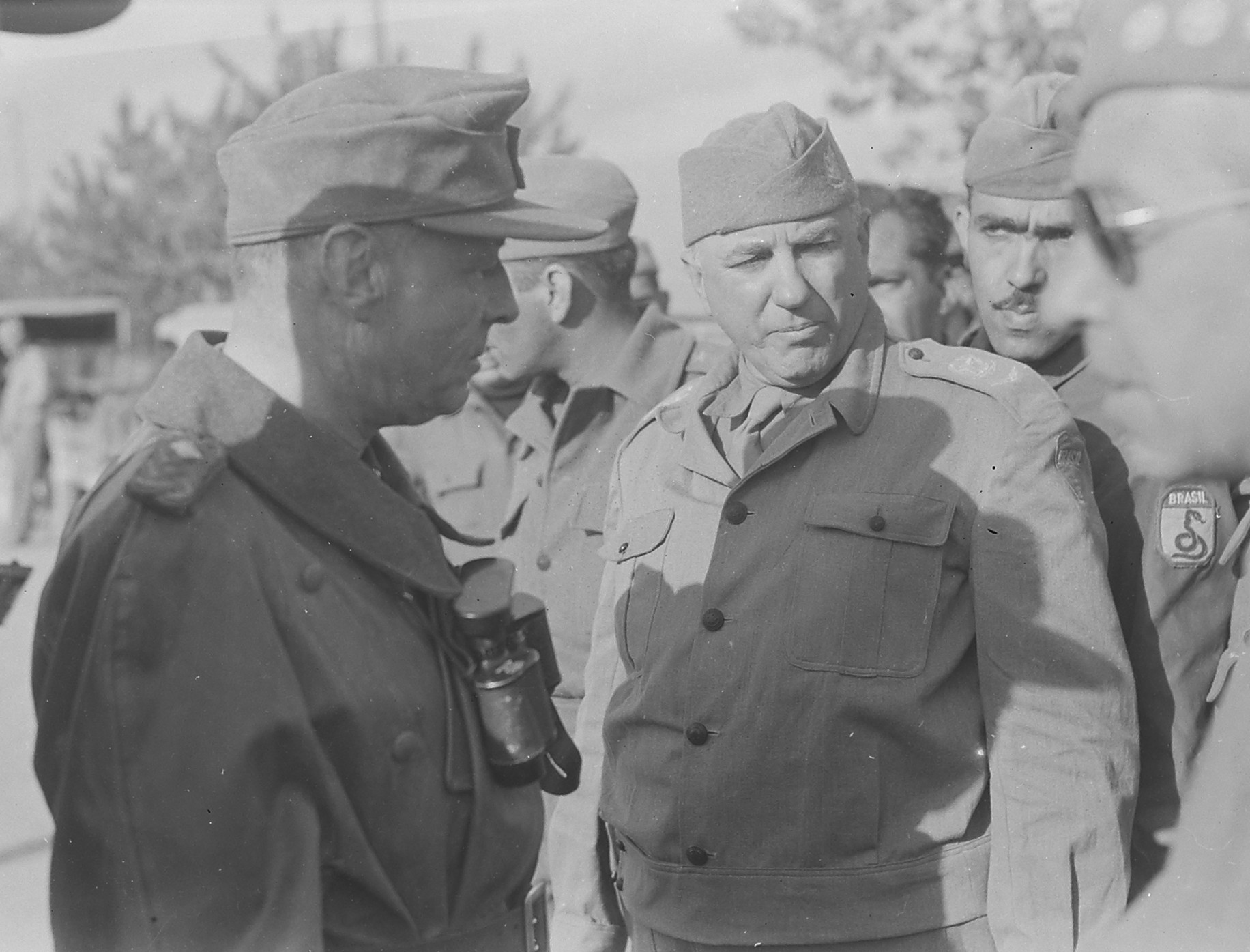
Generalleutnant Otto Fretter-Pico (left) surrendering to General Olímpio Falconière da Cunha (center) of the Brazilian 1st Infantry Division.

A famous Brazilianist, he wrote the book Soldiers of the Pátria, about the mentality and internal politics of the Brazilian Army during the formative period after the Paraguayan War and the proclamation of the dictatorship of the Estado Novo by Getúlio Vargas in 1937.

Frank also wrote another great work, the book Aliança Brasil-Estados Unidos 1937-1945, studying the relations between Brazil and the United States. First published in 1974, it ran for an honorable mention for the Bolton Prize and was the winner of the 1975 Bernath Prize. It was edited in Brazil by the Army Library (Bibliex). One of the comments made by McCann was the invitation to Brazil to participate in the administration of occupied Austria at the end of World War II.

In addition to a reference bibliography, Frank McCann has also published several periodicals and was invited to write chapters in books, generally aimed at the Brazilian Expeditionary Force. Among these various contributions is the last chapter in the 3rd edition (revised and enlarged) of the book A Luta dos Pracinhas: A FEB 50 anos depois - uma visão crítica (The Fight of the Pracinhas: FEB 50 years later - a critical view), by Joel Silveira and Tassilo Mitke. In his journal Brazil and World War II: The Forgotten Ally. What did you do in the war, Zé Carioca?, McCann brings a global view of Brazil's participation in World War II, analyzing the strategic thinking of Brazilian leaders, such as Góis Monteiro and Getúlio Vargas, acting in the South Atlantic and in Italy. The text briefly analyzes Brazilian aviation, but its main focus is on the land component. About the expeditionary division, McCann concluded:

"The FEB completed all the missions confided to it and compared favorably with the American divisions of the Fourth Corps. Unfortunately, the heavy symbolism of Monte Castello has obscured the FEB's victory at Montese on April 16, in which it took the town after a four-day gruelling battle, suffering 426 casualties. In the next days, it fought to a standstill the German 148th Division and Fascist Italian Monte Rosa, San Marco, and Italia Divisions, which surrendered to General Mascarenhas on April 29–30. In a matter of days, the Brazilians trapped and took the surrender of 2 generals, 800 officers, and 14,700 troops. The 148th was the only intact German division to surrender on that front. Although they had little preparation and served under foreign command, against a combat-experienced enemy, the "Smoking Cobras," as the FEB was nicknamed, had shown, as one of their songs put it, the "fiber of the Brazilian army" and the "grandeza de nossa gente" [greatness of our people]." (McCann, 1995, pg.15)

The song mentioned by McCann is Fibra de Herói (Hero Fiber). Other lesser-known books include Modern Brazil: Elites and Masses in Historical Perspective, co-authored with Michael L. Conniff, and A Nação Armada: Ensaios sobre a História do Exército Brasileiro. His latest book was Brazil and the United States During World War II and Its Aftermath: Negotiating Alliance and Balancing Giants, published on 6 October 2018 by publisher Palgrave MacMillan.

The Brazilian government recognized his commitment to the study of the country, conferring on him the titles of Commander of the Order of Rio Branco (1987) and the Medalha do Pacificador (Peacemaker Medal, 1995). Professor Frank McCann was fluent in Portuguese.

== Bibliography ==
=== Books ===
- Soldados da Pátria: História do Exército brasileiro de 1889 a 1937, Companhia das Letras, 2004 e 2009.
- Aliança Brasil-Estados Unidos 1937-1945, Biblioteca do Exército (Bibliex), 1995.
- A Nação Armada: Ensaios sobre a História do Exército Brasileira, Editora Guararapes, 1982.
- Modern Brazil: Elites and Masses in Historical Perspective, University of Nebraska Press, 1989.
- McCann, Frank D. (2015). The Brazilian-American Alliance, 1937-1945. Princeton, N.J: Princeton University Press. doi:10.1515/9781400870158. ISBN 978-1-4008-7015-8.
- Brazil and the United States During World War II and Its Aftermath: Negotiating Alliance and Balancing Giants, Palgrave MacMillan, 2018.

=== Articles ===
- Brazil and World War II: The Forgotten Ally. What did you do in the war, Zé Carioca?, University of New Hampshire, 1995.
- The Rise and Fall of the Brazilian-American Military Alliance, 1942-1977, University of New Hampshire, 2015.

== See also ==
- Brazilian Army
- Brazil during World War I
- Brazilian Expeditionary Force
