= Nova Baden State Park =

State park in Minas Gerais, Brazil

- Parque Estadual de Nova Baden
- IUCN category II (national park)
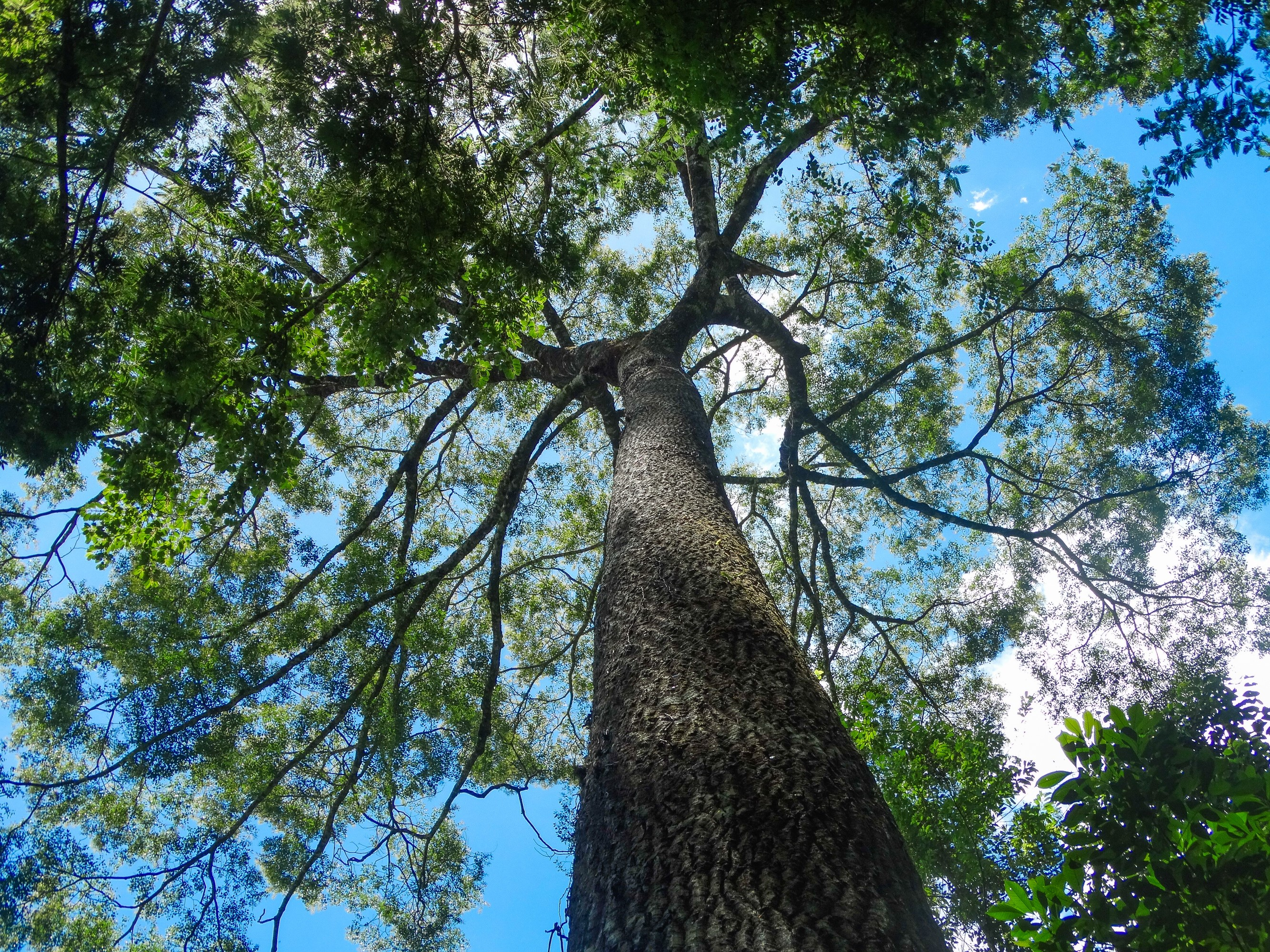
- Jequitibá-rosa (Cariniana legalis) in the park

- Location within Brazil
- Nearest city: Lambari, Minas Gerais
- Coordinates: 21°56′10″S 45°19′30″W
- Area: 214.47 hectares (530.0 acres)
- Designation: State park
- Created: 27 September 1994
- Administrator: Instituto Estadual de Florestas MG

The Nova Baden State Park (Portuguese: Parque Estadual de Nova Baden) is a state park in the state of Minas Gerais, Brazil. It protects a rugged, forested area that is home to several rare or endangered species of mammals.

== Location ==
The Nova Baden State Park is in the municipality of Lambari in the southern part of the state of Minas Gerais. It has an area of 214.47 hectares (530.0 acres). It is in the Serra da Mantiqueira, in the Ribeirão do Melo sub-basin of the Rio Grande basin. The terrain is steep and mountainous, with altitudes from 900 to 1,300 metres (3,000 to 4,300 ft). The climate has well-defined seasons, with average temperatures from 14.1 to 26.5 °C (57.4 to 79.7 °F) and occasional frost. Temperatures and rainfall are lower in winter, which lasts from April to September. Rain falls in more than 180 days each year. There are several springs in the forest. The main stream creates the Sete Quedas waterfall.

== History ==
The area was protected in 1974 when the Nova Baden Biological Reserve was created. This was changed to the Nova Baden State Park by decree 36.069 of 27 September 1994.

== Environment ==
The park holds Atlantic Forest flora and fauna. Tree species include jequitibá, cedro, peroba, palmito, jacarandá, pinheiro brasileiro and cedro. The highest trees are from 25 to 35 metres (82 to 115 ft) high. The climate is moist, creating an ecosystem rich in mosses, lichens, bromeliads and orchids. There are diverse lichens growing on the trees. These are sensitive to air pollution and drastic changes to the environment, so their presence indicates that air quality is good. There is a marshy area in the park with an exotic ornamental called marsh lily, and many species of herbaceous shrubs and trees of different families.

The park is an important refuge for several species of amphibians, mammals and birds. There are 22 species of mammals. Primates include howler monkeys, titis, micos and robust capuchin monkeys. There are ocelot (Leopardus pardalis), coatis, armadillos and southern tamandua (Tamandua tetradactyla). There are also Brazilian squirrel (Sciurus aestuans), tapeti (Sylvilagus brasiliensis), oncilla (Leopardus tigrinus), maned wolf (Chrysocyon brachyurus), cougar (Puma concolor) and buffy-tufted marmoset (Callithrix aurita).

78 species of birds have been identified from 30 families and 14 orders. Birds include drab-breasted bamboo tyrant (Hemitriccus diops), variable antshrike (Thamnophilus caerulescens), olivaceous woodcreeper (Sittasomus griseicapillus), blue dacnis (Dacnis cayana), blue manakin (Chiroxiphia caudata), robust woodpecker (Campephilus robustus), red-ruffed fruitcrow (Pyroderus scutatus), shrike-like laniisoma (Laniisoma elegans), saffron finch (Sicalis flaveola), wedge-tailed grass finch (Emberizoides herbicola) and yellow-faced siskin (Spinus yarrellii). The insect pachymeroceroides novabadensis, which prefers a very humid environment, was first discovered in the park.

== Facilities ==
The park has a visitor center in a 19th-century mansion that was once home of the engineer, writer and politician Américo Werneck, whose family came from Baden-Baden, Germany, and whose land became the park. It includes an auditorium for 90 people, meeting rooms and an environmental police post. The headquarters has gardens, lawns and a small playground for children. There are three trails, each taking less than an hour. One leads to the Sete Quedas waterfall and passes a jequitibá tree more than 300 years old. The others lead through interesting forest areas and over watercourses. There is no camping area or visitor accommodations. As of 2016 the park was open from 08:00 to 17:00 on Tuesdays to Sundays and holidays.

== Sources ==
- "P. Est Nova Baden", Descubra Minas (in Portuguese), SENAC Minas
- Parque Estadual de Nova Baden (in Portuguese), IEF: Instituto Estadual de Florestas
- Parque Estadual Nova Baden (in Portuguese), Vaqueano
