= Wilson Martins (literary critic) =

Brazilian literary critic and cultural historian

- Born: March 3, 1921; São Paulo, Brazil
- Died: January 30, 2010 (aged 88); Curitiba, Brazil
- Education: Federal University of Paraná
- Occupations: Journalist, professor, judge
- Writing career
- Subject: Literary history
- Notable work: História da Inteligência Brasileira (1976 - 1978)

Wilson Martins (March 3, 1921 – January 30, 2010) was a Brazilian literary critic, cultural historian, and journalist. He is best remembered for the seven-volume series História da Inteligência Brasileira.

== Biography ==
Born in São Paulo, Martins described his education as marked by ''rigor, discipline, and obedience''. He read voraciously on a variety of subjects from a young age and began his career in journalism early on; at the age of 16, he was already working as copy editor for Gazeta do Povo, which hired him as a full-time articulist in 1945. Around that time, he also worked as a radio presenter for Rádio RB2 (pt).

Martins graduated in 1943 with a law degree from the Federal University of Paraná. Three years later, he published the book Interpretações, a collection of critical essays. Between 1947 and 48, he earned a scholarship to study literature in Paris, which allowed him to initiate a teaching career in his alma mater. From 1965 to 1991, he taught Brazilian literature at New York University.

In 1954, he was hired by the newspaper O Estado de S.Paulo to work as a full-time critic, taking over the role previously occupied by Sérgio Milliet. From 1978 to 1995, he was a regular contributor for Jornal do Brasil.

The series História da Inteligência Brasileira, written entirely by Martins, was published between 1976 and 1979 and earned him the Prêmio Jabuti for literary studies and human sciences. It is regarded as a comprehensive and in-depth account of Brazil's intellectual history, covering philosophy, historiography, prose literature, poetry, theatre, and ideology.

In 2002, he was awarded the Machado de Assis Prize by the Brazilian Academy of Letters for his body of work. Martins firmly criticized relativism, multiculturalism, and the so-called littérature engagée.

== Works ==
His major works include:

- O Modernismo (1965, 5ª ed. 1977) - tr. Jack Tomlins (1971), The modernist idea: a critical survey of Brazilian writing in the twentieth century, New York University Press, ISBN 0-8147-0293-7 reviewed at
- História da Inteligência Brasileira - 7 volumes
- A Crítica Literária no Brasil - 2 volumes
