= Franklin de Oliveira =

Brazilian literary critic (1916–2000)

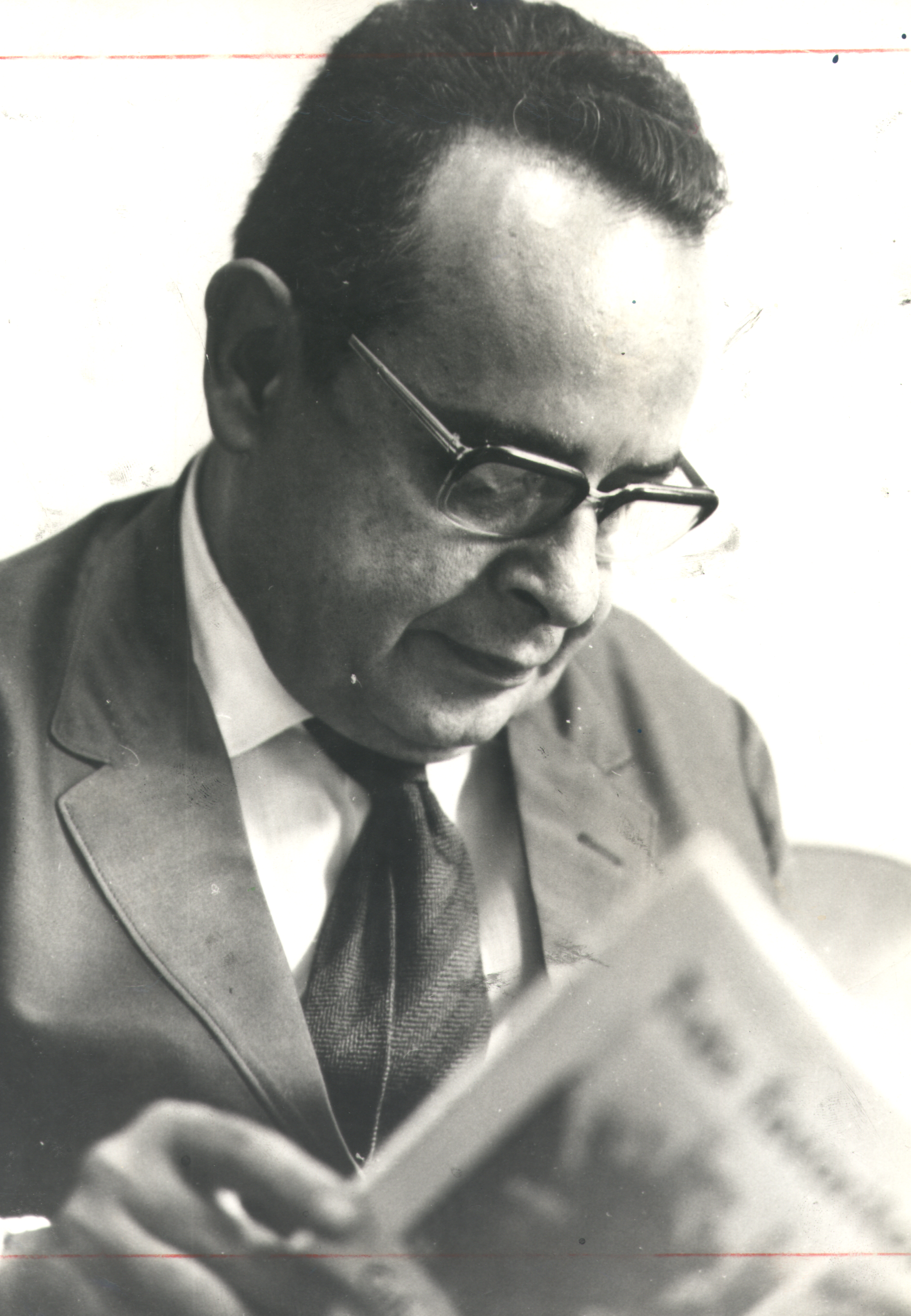
- Born: March 12, 1916; São Luís, Maranhão, Brazil
- Died: June 6, 2000 (aged 84); Rio de Janeiro, Rio de Janeiro
- Occupation: Journalist
- Years active: 1932 - c. 1990
- Notable work: Literatura e Civilização (1978)
- Awards: Prêmio Machado de Assis (1981)

José Ribamar Franklin de Oliveira (March 12, 1916 – June 6, 2000) was a Brazilian essayist, journalist, and literary critic. In 1983, he received the Machado de Assis Prize for his body of work, which includes crônicas, music criticism, historical books, and essays on politics.

== Biography ==
Born in São Luís into a family of humanists, Oliveira read avidly as a child and also received a musical education, learning to play the violin. He began his career in journalism at the age of sixteen, writing to the newspaper Diário da Tarde, at a time when he was already engaged in labor activism. By the late 1930s, he was a contributor to A Notícia (pt). In 1944 he launched his weekly column Sete Dias in O Cruzeiro, which he maintained for twelve years.

In 1956, Oliveira became an editorialist at Correio da Manhã, where he shared a column with Otto Maria Carpeaux, writing articles on culture, music, and literary critiques of Brazilian authors, particularly Guimarães Rosa and Graciliano Ramos. In the 1960s, Oliveira began devoting himself to political and social studies. He compiled his articles on the situation of the state of Rio Grande do Sul in a 1963 book, in which he compared the region to Northeastern Brazil and advocated State-funded regional development.

In 1960, he moved to Porto Alegre, where he served as secretary to the Council of Economic Development of Rio Grande do Sul under Leonel Brizola. Oliveira was appointed to work at Petrobras, but in the wake of the 1964 military coup d'état, he had his political rights revoked and resumed his journalistic career, working as an editor at O Globo and later as a columnist at Folha de São Paulo. He authored several entries for Mirador Internacional.

== Works ==
- Ad Imortalitatem (1935)
- Sete dias (1948)
- A fantasia exata (1959)
- Rio Grande do Sul, um novo Nordeste (1962)
- Revolução e contra-revolução no Brasil (1963)
- Viola d'amore (1965)
- Morte da memória nacional (1967)
- A tragédia da renovação brasileira (1971)
- Literatura e civilização (1978)
- Euclides: a espada e a letra (1983)
- A dança das letras (critical anthology, 1991)
- A Semana da Arte Moderna na contramão da história e outros ensaios (1993)
