= Maria Clara Machado =

Brazilian playwright

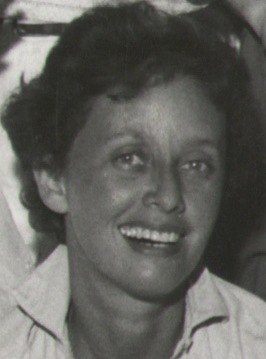
- Maria Clara Machado
- Born: 3 April 1921 Belo Horizonte, Brazil
- Died: 30 April 2001 (aged 80) Rio de Janeiro, Brazil
- Occupation: Playwright
- Genre: Children's
- Notable awards: Prêmio Machado de Assis
- Parents: Aníbal Machado

Maria Clara Machado (3 April 1921, in Belo Horizonte — 30 April 2001, in Rio de Janeiro) was a Brazilian playwright, who specialized on plays for children.

== Biography ==
Daughter of writer Aníbal Machado, she studied theater in Paris. On her return to Brazil, she founded the acting school O Tablado, in Rio de Janeiro. O Tablado was where many Brazilian actors learnt the trade and was the venue where she directed her own plays.

Among those, Pluft o Fantasminha (Pluft the Little Ghost) (1955), A Bruxinha que Era Boa (The Little Witch who was Good), Maroquinhas Fru-Fru, O Rapto das Cebolinhas (The Kidnapping of the Onions), A Menina e o Vento (The Girl and the Wind), O Cavalinho Azul (The Little Blue Horse), Tribobó City, and many others.

Machado received a number of awards including the Prêmio Machado de Assis from the Brazilian Academy of Letters.
