= Neilor =

Brazilian footballer

Personal information
- Full name: Neilor Elias Cassimiro
- Date of birth: January 31, 1986 (age 40)
- Place of birth: Lambari, Brazil
- Height: 1.79 m (5 ft 10 in)
- Position: Defensive midfielder

Team information
- Current team: Caxias

Youth career
- 2005: Cruzeiro

Senior career*
Years	Team	Apps	(Gls)
2006	Nacional-MG (Loan)		
2006	Guarani-MG (Loan)		
2007	Tupi (Loan)		
2008	Caxias (Loan)		
- * Club domestic league appearances and goals

Neilor Elias Cassimiro or simply Neilor (born January 31, 1986, in Lambari), is a Brazilian defensive midfielder. He currently plays for Caxias on loan from Cruzeiro.

== Contract ==
- Caxias (Loan) 1 January 2008 to 30 April 2008
- Cruzeiro 8 May 2007 to 30 April 2008
