= Francisco de Assis Almeida Brasil =

Brazilian writer (1932–2021)

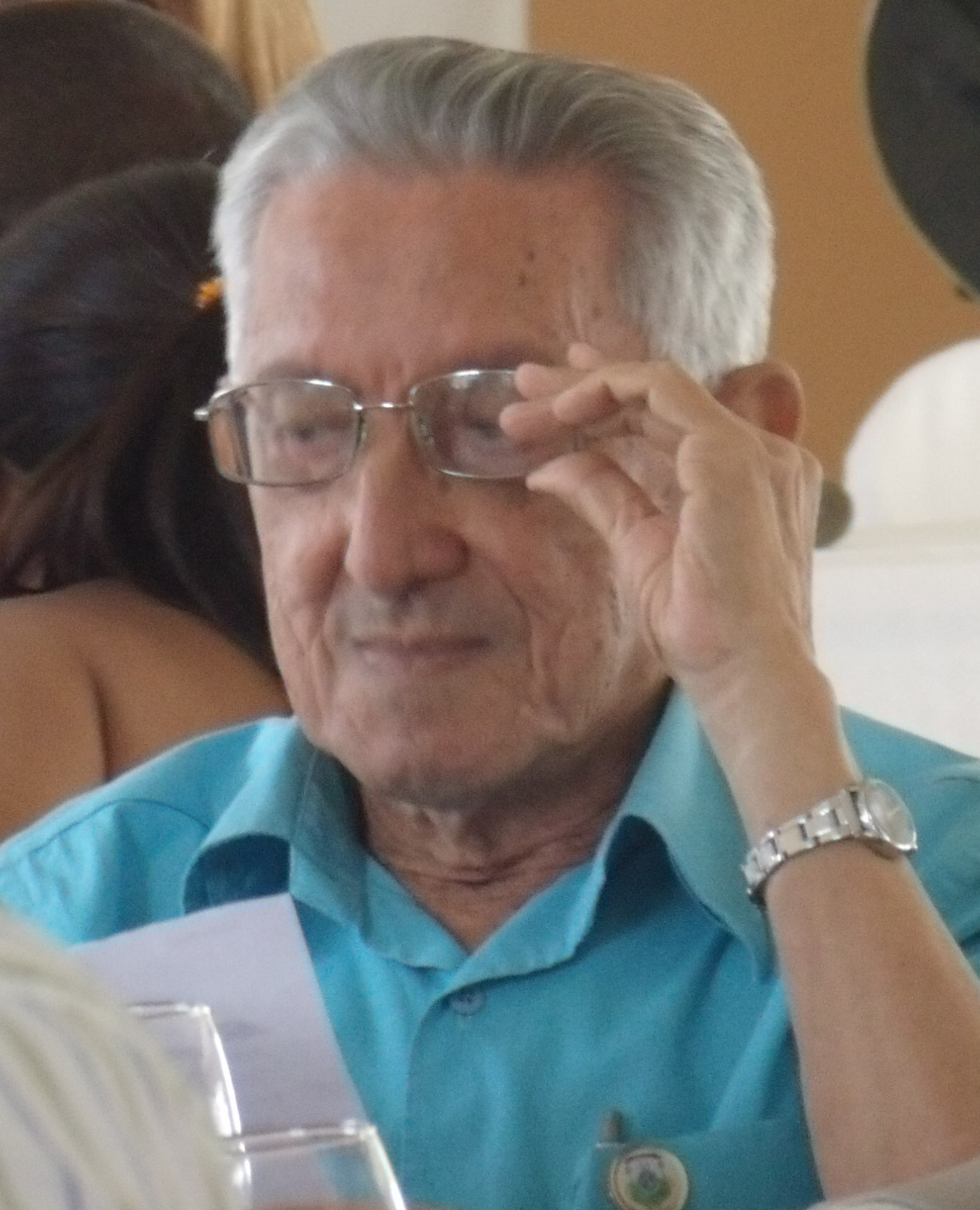
- Born: Francisco de Assis Almeida Brasil; 18 February 1932; Parnaíba
- Died: 28 November 2021 (aged 89); Teresina
- Occupation: Writer, literary scholar, literary critic
- Awards: honorary doctorate (Federal University of Piauí, 2012); Prêmio Machado de Assis (2004, 2004)

Francisco de Assis Almeida Brasil (18 February 1932 – 28 November 2021), better known as Assis Brasil, was a Brazilian writer and member of the Academia Piauiense de Letras.

== Biography ==
He was born in Parnaíba. A novelist, chronicler, essayist, Piauí writer and journalist, he also worked as a literary critic, intensely, in the Brazilian press, especially in Jornal do Brasil, Diário de Notícias, Correio da Manhã and O Globo, as well as in the magazines O Cruzeiro, Enciclopédia Bloch and Revista do Livro.

He published over a hundred works, among them Beira Rio Beira Vida, 1965; A Filha do Meio Quilo, 1966; O Salto do Cavalo Cobridor and Pacamão (Tetralogia Puiense); Os que Bebem como os Cães (Ciclo do Terror); Nassau, Sangue e Amor nos Trópicos, Jovita and Tiradentes (historical novels).

He died on 28 November 2021, at the age of 92, in Teresina.

== Awards ==
- In 2004, the country's main literary award: the Prêmio Machado de Assis, offered by the Brazilian Academy of Letters to Brazilian writers for their body of work. His literary quality and intense and uninterrupted production also led him to the Academia Piauiense de Letras, where he occupied the chair 36, and to be cited as an important author of the so-called Generation of 45.
- In 2012, he received the title of "Doctor Honoris Causa" by the Federal University of Piauí.

== Sources ==
- "Escritor Assis Brasil morre aos 92 anos em Teresina" (in Portuguese). 28 November 2021.
- Neto, Adrião (1995). Dicionário Biográfico Escritores Piauienses De Todos Os Tempos. Teresina, Halley S.A.
- Moraes, Herculano (1982). Visão histórica da literatura piauiense. Teresina: Academia Piauiense de Letras.
- Romero Lima, Luiz (2000). Literatura Piauiense. Teresina: Gráfica Ibiapina.
- Almanaque da Parnaíba Revista da Academia Parnaibana de Letras (71ª ed.). Parnaíba: Academia Parnaibana de Letras/sieart. 2018. ISBN 9788554245238.
- Neto, Adrião (2003). Literatura Piauiense Para Estudantes (10ª ed.). Teresina (PI): Edições Geração 70.
- Gomes Campelo, Thomas (2003). Antologia Escritores III. União Brasileira de Escritores do Piauí. Teresina: UBE, edição em volume.
- Rios Magalhães, Maria do Socorro; Monteiro Rocha, Dheiky do Rêgo. A contribuição do escritor piauiense Assis Brasil para a literatura brasileira destinada ao público jovem (PDF).
- "El poder de la palabra". Academia Brasileira de Letras.
- "Assis Brasil: A Máquina de Escrever". Revestrés.
- Bezerra, Roger (21 March 2018). "Francisco de ASSIS Almeida BRASIL". Academia Piauiense de Letras.
- Universidade Federal do Piauí. MINISTÉRIO DA EDUCAÇÃO (29 November 2021). "Nota de pesar: Escritor Assis Brasil, Doutor Honoris Causa pela UFPI".
