= Benedito Nunes =

Brazilian philosopher and literary critic

- Born: Benedito José Viana da Costa Nunes; November 21, 1929; Belém, Brazil
- Died: February 27, 2011 (aged 81); Belém, Brazil
- Occupation: Professor
- Awards: Prêmio Jabuti

Benedito José Viana da Costa Nunes (November 21, 1929 - February 27, 2011) was a Brazilian philosopher and literary critic. In 2010, he was awarded the Prêmio Machado de Assis.

Born in Belém, a major city in the north of Brazil, where he was later a professor at the Federal University of Pará. He has also lectured at other universities in the south of Brazil, France and the United States. In 1987, he was awarded the Prêmio Jabuti, regarded as the most prestigious literary prize in Brazil. He was awarded again with the same prize in 2010, for the literary critique A Clave do Poético. He was one of the most respected authorities in contemporary Brazilian culture, and a specialist in the literary work of Brazilian modernists such as Clarice Lispector.

His uncle was the poet and hellenist Carlos Alberto Nunes, whose translations of Plato Benedito Nunes coordinated in a collection published by the Federal University of Pará. He died in his hometown Belém on February 27, 2011.

== Works ==
- Passagem para o poético - Filosofia e Poesia em Heidegger, 1968;
- O Dorso do Tigre (from the collection Debates- literary and philosophical essays), 1969;
- João Cabral de Melo Neto (from the collection Poetas Modernos do Brasil), 1974;
- Oswald Canibal (from the collection Elos), 1979;
- No tempo da narrativa, 1988;
- O drama da linguagem - Uma leitura de Clarice Lispector, 1989;
- Introdução à Filosofia da Arte, 1989;
- A Filosofia Contemporânea, 1991;
- No tempo do niilismo e outros ensaios, 1993;
- Crivo de papel (literary and philosophical essays), 1998;
- Hermenêutica e poesia - O pensamento poético, 1999;
- Dois Ensaios e Duas Lembranças, 2000;
- O Nietzsche de Heidegger, 2000;
- Heidegger e Ser e Tempo, 2002.
