= Prêmio Machado de Assis =

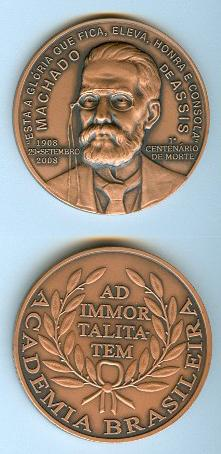
- Awarded for: Best literary talent from a Brazilian writer
- Date: 1941
- Location: Rio de Janeiro
- Country: Brazil
- Website: www.academia.org.br

The Prêmio Machado de Assis (the Machado de Assis Prize) is a literary prize awarded by the Brazilian Academy of Letters, and possibly the most prestigious literary award in Brazil. The prize was founded in 1941, named in memory of the novelist Joaquim Maria Machado de Assis (1839–1908). It is awarded in recognition of a lifetime's work.

== Winners ==
- 1941 – Tetra de Teffé
- 1942 – Afonso Schmidt
- 1943 – Sousa da Silveira
- 1944 – not awarded
- 1945 – Osório Dutra
- 1946 – Tobias Monteiro
- 1947 – Padre Leonel Franca
- 1948 – Augusto Meyer
- 1949 – not awarded
- 1950 – Eugênio Gomes
- 1951 – Padre Augusto Magne
- 1952 – Antonio da Silva Melo
- 1953 – Érico Veríssimo
- 1954 – Dinah Silveira de Queiroz
- 1955 – Onestaldo Penafort
- 1956 – Luiz da Câmara Cascudo
- 1957 – Tasso da Silveira
- 1958 – Rachel de Queiroz
- 1959 – José Maria Belo
- 1960 – not awarded
- 1961 – João Guimarães Rosa
- 1962 – Antenor Nascentes
- 1963 – Gilberto Freyre
- 1964 – Joracy Camargo
- 1965 – Cecília Meireles
- 1966 – Lúcio Cardoso
- 1967 – Adelino Magalhães
- 1968 – Oscar Mendes
- 1969 – Edilson Carneiro
- 1970 – Otávio de Faria
- 1971 – Murillo Araujo
- 1972 – Dalcídio Jurandir
- 1973 – Andrade Murici
- 1974 – Waldemar Cavalcanti
- 1975 – Hermes Lima
- 1976 – Mario da Silva Brito
- 1977 – Raul Bopp
- 1978 – Carolina Nabuco
- 1979 – Gilka Machado
- 1980 – Mário Quintana
- 1981 – Ayres da Matta Machado Filho
- 1982 – Franklin de Oliveira
- 1983 – Paulo Rónai
- 1984 – Henriqueta Lisboa
- 1985 – Thales de Azevedo
- 1986 – Péricles Eugênio da Silva Ramos
- 1987 – Nilo Pereira
- 1988 – Dante Milano
- 1989 – Gilberto Mendonça Teles
- 1990 – Sábato Magaldi
- 1991 – Maria Clara Machado
- 1992 – Fausto Cunha
- 1993 – Antonio Candido
- 1994 – Antônio Olinto
- 1995 – Leodegário A. de Azevedo Filho
- 1996 – Carlos Heitor Cony
- 1997 – J.J. Veiga
- 1998 – Joel Silveira
- 1999 – Fernando Sabino
- 2000 – Antônio Torres
- 2001 – Ana Maria Machado
- 2002 – Wilson Martins
- 2003 – Antonio Carlos Villaça
- 2004 – Francisco de Assis Brasil
- 2005 – Ferreira Gullar
- 2006 – César Leal
- 2007 – Roberto Cavalcanti de Albuquerque
- 2008 – Autran Dourado
- 2009 – Salim Miguel
- 2010 – Benedito Nunes
- 2011 – Carlos Guilherme Mota
- 2012 – Dalton Trevisan
- 2013 – Silviano Santiago
- 2014 – Vamireh Chacon
- 2015 – Rubem Fonseca
- 2016 – Ignácio de Loyola Brandão
- 2017 – João José Reis
- 2018 to 2020 – not awarded
- 2021 – Ruy Castro
- 2022 – Roberto DaMatta
- 2023 – Marina Colasanti
- 2024 – Adélia Prado
- 2025 – Rubens Ricupero
- 2026 – Cristóvão Tezza
