= Dante Milano =

Brazilian poet

- Born: June 16, 1899; Rio de Janeiro, Brazil
- Died: April 15, 1991 (aged 91); Petrópolis, Brazil
- Writing career
- Genre: Poetry
- Notable awards: Prêmio Machado de Assis
- Literary movement: Modernism

Dante Milano (June 16, 1899 – April 15, 1991) was a Brazilian poet associated with modernism.

== Life ==
He was born in Rio de Janeiro in 1899. His family were Italian immigrants. In 1947 he married a woman named Alda. He died in Petrópolis in 1991.

== Career ==
Milano's first poem was published in 1920 in the magazine Selecta. In 1935 he edited an anthology of modernist poetry. In 1948, he published the collection Poesias, which won the Prêmio Felipe d’Oliveira, for the best poetry book of the year. In 1979, he published a further collection, Poesia e Prosa.

He also published translations, including of Dante Alighieri, André Mallarmé, and Shakespeare.

He was included in de Loanda's Antologia da moderna poesia brasileira in 1968. In 1988 he won the prestigious Prêmio Machado de Assis, a prize given by the Academia Brasileira de Letras for the whole body of a writer's work.

A collected edition of his works was published in 2004. A selected volume was published in 2010. A biography and study, Pós-escrito a Dante Milano: & uma biografia construtivista, was published in 2023 by poet Thomaz Albornoz Neves.
