= Nilo Pereira =

Brazilian journalist and teacher

Nilo de Oliveira Pereira (11 December 1909, in Ceará-Mirim – 23 January 1992, in Recife) was a Brazilian politician, journalist, and professor. In 1987, he was awarded the Machado de Assis Prize for his body of work.

He graduated in law at the Faculty of Law of Recife in 1932, but practiced law only briefly.

== Journalist ==
He exercised journalism in the following periodicals:

- Diário de Natal
- A República
- O Estado
- Tribuna do Norte
- Folha da Manha (he was editor in chief)
- Jornal Pequeno
- The Tribune
- Jornal do Commercio (Recife)
- Jornal do Commercio (Rio de Janeiro)
- Diário de Pernambuco

== Literary life ==
He was a member of the following literary and cultural institutions:

- Academia Pernambucana de Letras (Chair 16)
- Instituto Arqueológico, Histórico e Geográrico Pernambucano

== Books published ==
- Camões e Nabuco(1949);
- Revisionismo e tradição (1950);
- Dom Vital e a questão religiosa no Brasil (1966);
- Conflitos entre a Igreja e o Estado no Brasil (1970);
- Espírito de província (1970);
- Ensaios de história regional (1972);
- Agamenon Magalhães: uma evocação pessoal (1973);
- O tempo mágico (1975);
- A Faculdade de Direito do Recife, 1927-1977 (1977);
- Um tempo do Recife (1978);
- Reflexões de um fim de século (1979);
- Igreja e Estado: relações difíceis (1982);
- Iniciação ao jornalismo: pesquisa histórica (1982);
- A rosa verde: crônica quase romance (1982);
- Pernambucanidade: alguns aspectos históricos (1983);
- Gilberto Freyre visto de perto (1986);
- Mauro Mota e o seu tempo (1987);
- Profissionais de Pernambuco (1989);
- O Estado Novo em Pernambuco (1989);
- Conferência sobre a vida e a obra do abolicionista José Mariano (1990);

== Awards ==
- Professor Emeritus and Honorary Doctorate from the University Federal de Pernambuco [2];
- Doctor Honoris Causa from the Federal University of Rio Grande do Norte;
- Carneiro Vilela Medal of Pernambuco Academy of Letters
- Prêmio Machado de Assis of Brazilian Academy of Letters.
