= Vamireh Chacon =

Brazilian political scientist

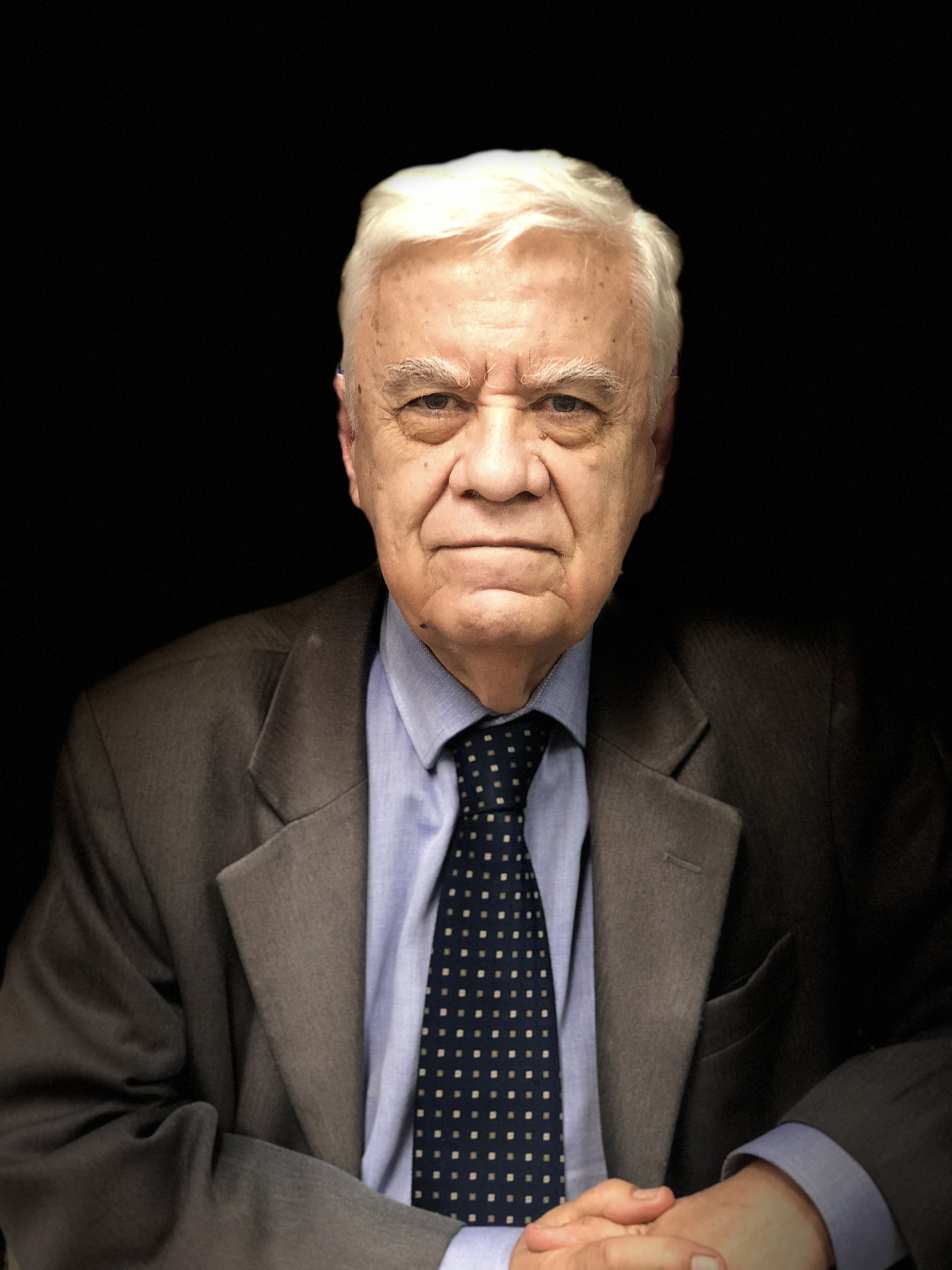
- Chacon in 2018
- Born: February 1, 1934; Recife, Brazil
- Died: September 18, 2023 (aged 89); Brasília, Brazil
- Awards: Machado de Assis Prize (2014)

Academic background
- Education: Catholic University of Pernambuco, Faculty of Law of Recife

Academic work
- Discipline: History, political science, sociology, law
- Institutions: Federal University of Pernambuco, University of Brasília

Vamireh Chacon de Albuquerque Nascimento (February 1, 1934 – September 18, 2023) was a Brazilian historian, political scientist, jurist, and professor. In 2014, he was awarded the Machado de Assis Prize for his body of work, which includes studies on a wide range of subjects, in particular the cultural sphere he called ''Great Iberia'', the Iberian humanism, and the evolution of social sciences and political institutions in Brazil.

== Biography ==
Born in Recife to a family of Portuguese and Spanish descent, Chacon began his journalistic career as a teenager after a short trip to Europe, writing articles for Folha da Manhã. He completed both his law and philosophy degrees simultaneously, the latter at the Catholic University of Pernambuco. In 1959, he earned a doctoral degree under Arnóbio Graça at the Faculty of Law of Recife with a thesis titled Introdução ao problema da Sociologia do Direito. His works soon drew the attention of Gilberto Freyre, whom Chacon later met. Freyre would become the subject of an intellectual biography by Chacon.

In Germany, at the universities of Munich, Koln, and Münster, Chacon attended classes by Hans Freyer, Alfred von Martin, and Leopold von Wiese, and had contact with the Frankfurt School, of which he became one of the first commentators in Brazil, with an interest in Theodor W. Adorno.

Another focus of his research was the Recife School, to which he dedicated the study Da Escola do Recife ao Código Civil: Artur Orlando e sua geração and the book A luz do Norte: o Nordeste na história das ideias do Brasil.

In 1960, he completed postdoctoral studies at the University of Chicago. The following year he became a professor at the Federal University of Pernambuco, presenting the thesis O fator econômico no marxismo. In 1971, he was appointed full professor at the University of Brasília, where he was later made professur emeritus. He was among the founders of the Brazilian Academy of Philosophy.

== Works ==
- O antissemitismo no Brasil - Tentativa de interpretação sociológica (1955)
- Introdução ao problema da Sociologia do Direito (1959)
- Cooperativismo e comunitarismo: Estudo de organização socioeconômica (1959)
- A Revolução no trópico: Nacionalismo, Marxismo e Desenvolvimento (1962)
- Da Escola do Recife ao Código Civil: Artur Orlando e sua geração (1969)
- Economia e sociedade no Brasil - Ensaios de história econômica e social compreensiva (1973)
- Thomas Mann e o Brasil (1975)
- História ideias sociológicas no Brasil (1977)
- O dilema político brasileiro (1978)
- História das ideias socialistas no Brasil (1981)
- Parlamento e parlamentarismo: O Congresso Nacional na história do Brasil (1982)
- Abreu e Lima, general de Bolívar (1983)
- O poço do passado (1984)
- O novo parlamentarismo (1987)
- Vida e morte das constituições brasileiras (1987)
- A luz do Norte: o Nordeste na história das ideias do Brasil (1989)
- Deus é brasileiro: O imaginário do messianismo político no Brasil (1990)
- Gilberto Freyre: Uma biografia intelectual (1993)
- História institucional do Senado do Brasil (1997)
- História dos partidos brasileiros (1998)
- O humanismo ibérico: A escolástica progressista e a questão da modernidade (1998)
- A construção da brasilidade: Gilberto Freyre e sua geração (2001)
- O futuro político da Lusofonia (2002)
- Globalização e Estados transnacionais: Relações Internacionais no século XXI (2002)
- A Grande Ibéria: Convergências e divergências de uma tendência (2005)
- História do Legislativo Brasileiro: Câmara dos Deputados (2008)
