= Aníbal Machado =

Brazilian writer

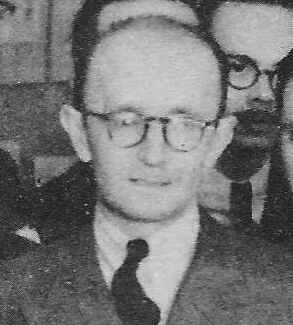
- Aníbal Machado, c. 1940
- Born: 9 December 1894; Sabará, Minas Gerais, Brazil
- Died: 20 January 1964 (aged 69); Rio de Janeiro, Rio de Janeiro, Brazil
- Occupation: Writer
- Children: Maria Clara Machado

Aníbal Machado (9 December 1894, in Sabará – 20 January 1964, in Rio de Janeiro) was a Brazilian writer born in Sabará, Minas Gerais. He was the president of the Brazilian Association of Writers and received numerous awards for his novels. He was also honored by the Academia Brasileira de Letras. He was the father of playwright Maria Clara Machado. Machado was also a pro-football player for Clube Atlético Mineiro and scored the very first goal for the team in 1909.
