= José J. Veiga =

Brazilian writer

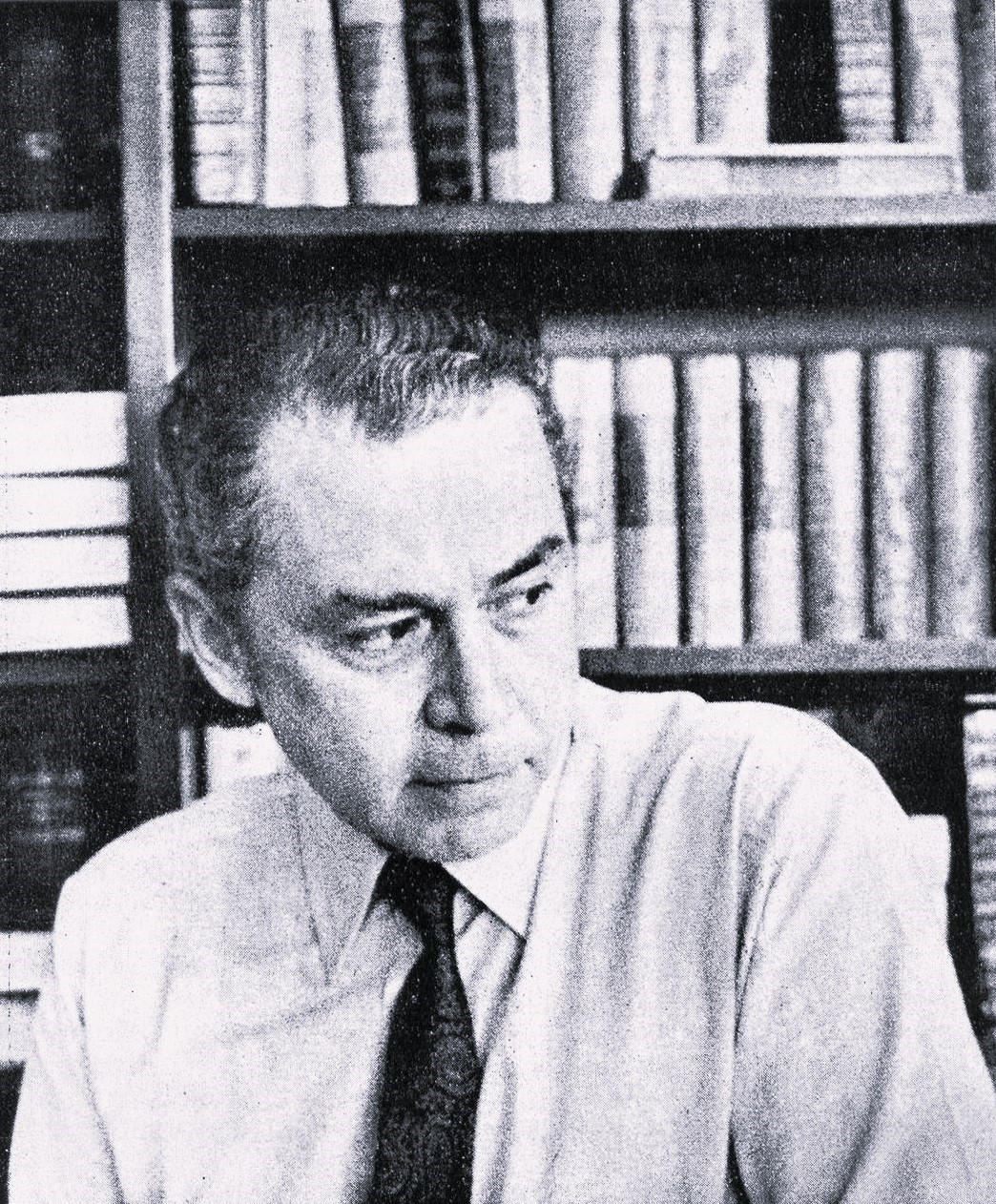
- Born: February 2, 1915; Near Corumbá de Goiás, Brazil
- Died: September 19, 1999 (aged 84); Rio de Janeiro, Brazil
- Education: Faculdade Nacional de Direito
- Occupations: Translator, editor, commentator
- Writing career
- Language: Portuguese
- Subjects: Social and political criticism
- Notable awards: Machado of Assis Prize

José Veiga, known as José J. Veiga (February 2, 1915 – September 19, 1999), was a Brazilian writer. His writings are often classified within the magical realism genre, although he denied the label; his books deal with social and political criticism, with lyrical overtones.

== Biography ==
Veiga was born in 1915 at Fazenda Morro Grande, a farm near Corumbá de Goiás. At age 20, he established himself in Rio de Janeiro where, among other jobs, worked as locutor of the currently defunct Rádio Guanabara. In 1941 he graduated in Law at Faculdade Nacional de Direito. From 1945 until 1949 Veiga lived in London, as commentator and translator for the Portuguese broadcasts of BBC World Service. Returning to Brazil, he worked as journalist in the newspapers O Globo and Tribuna da Imprensa. He was also translator and editor of the Brazilian edition of Reader's Digest and coordinated the publishing department of the Getúlio Vargas Foundation.

Veiga affirmed to have chosen his literary name thanks to the help of João Guimarães Rosa who suggested it to him to add a "J", from "Jacinto", Veiga's mother surname, shortly before the publication in 1959 of Os cavalinhos of Platiplanto, his first book edited. The same year, the book won the Fábio Prado Award.

His works have been published in the United States, England, Mexico, Spain, Denmark, Sweden, Norway and Portugal. In 1997, he won the Machado of Assis Prize for lifetime achievement, awarded by the Brazilian Academy of Letters.

He died in Rio de Janeiro in 1999 from pancreatic cancer and complications caused by anemia.

== Works ==
- Os Cavalinhos de Platiplanto (1959);
- A Hora dos Ruminantes (1966);
  - English translation:The Three Trials of Manirema (translated by Pamela G. Bird); Alfred A. Knopf, 1970.
- A Máquina Extraviada (1967);
  - English translation:The Misplaced Machine and other Stories; Alfred A. Knopf, 1970.
- Sombras de Reis Barbudos (1972);
- Os Pecados da Tribo (1976);
- O Professor Burim e as Quatro Calamidades (1978);
- De Jogos e Festas (1980);
- Aquele Mundo de Vasabarros (1982);
- Torvelinho Dia e Noite (1985);
- A Casca da Serpente (1989);
- Os melhores contos de J. J. Veiga (1989);
- O Almanach de Piumhy - Restaurado por José J. Veiga (1989);
- O Risonho Cavalo do Príncipe (1993);
- O Relógio Belizário (1995);
- Tajá e Sua Gente (1997);
- Objetos Turbulentos (1997).
