= Lambari, Minas Gerais =

Lambari
- Municipality
- Municipality of Lambari
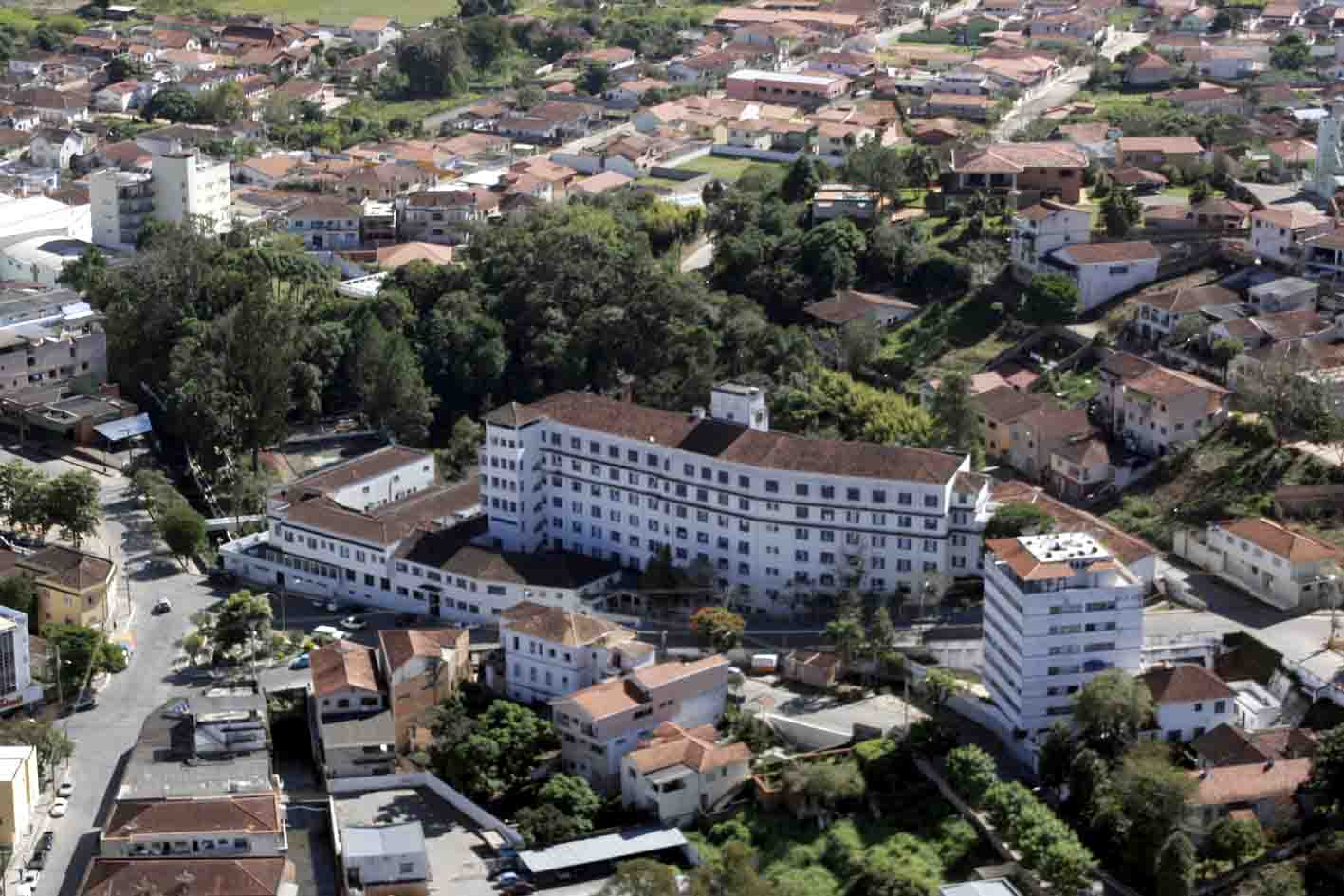
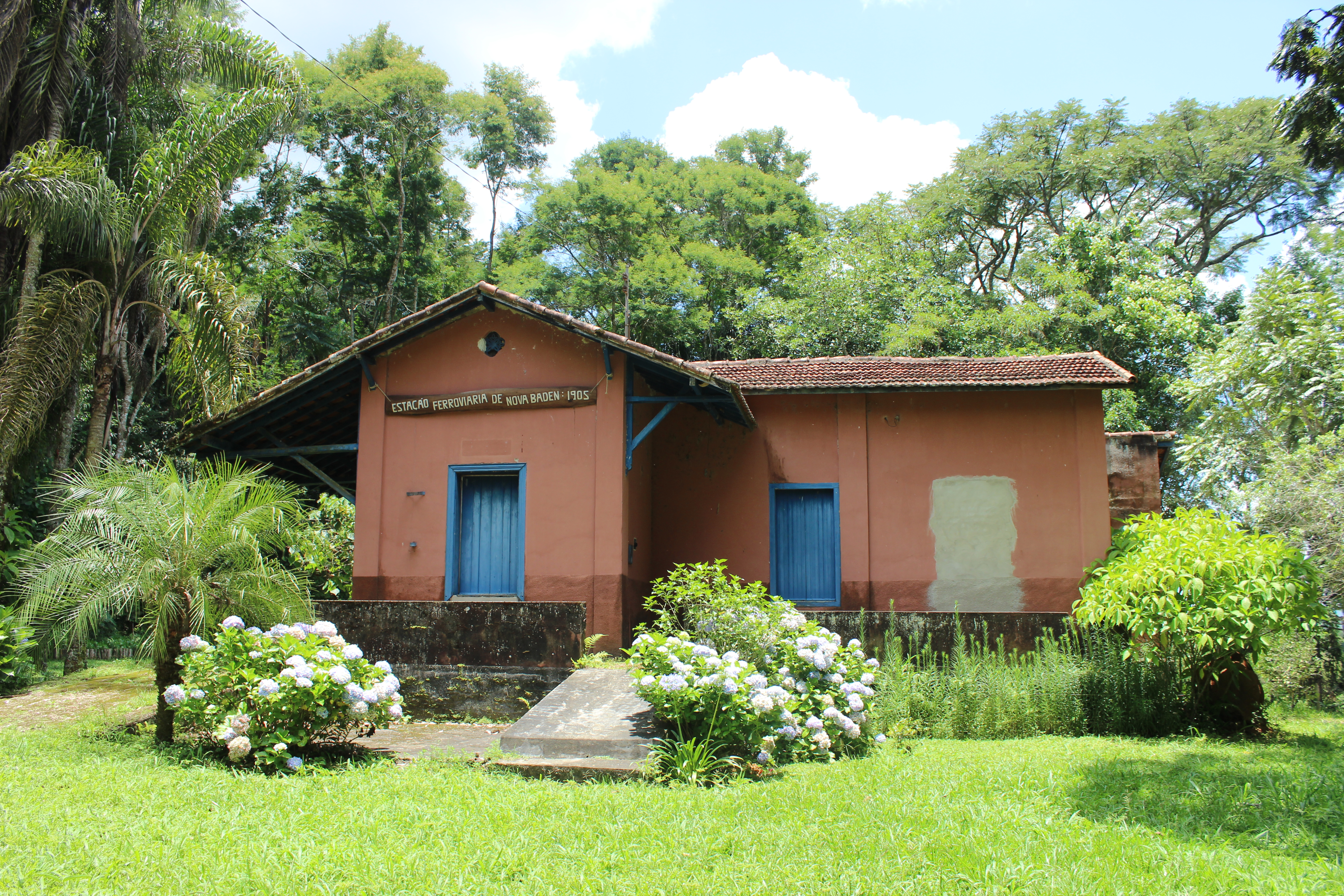
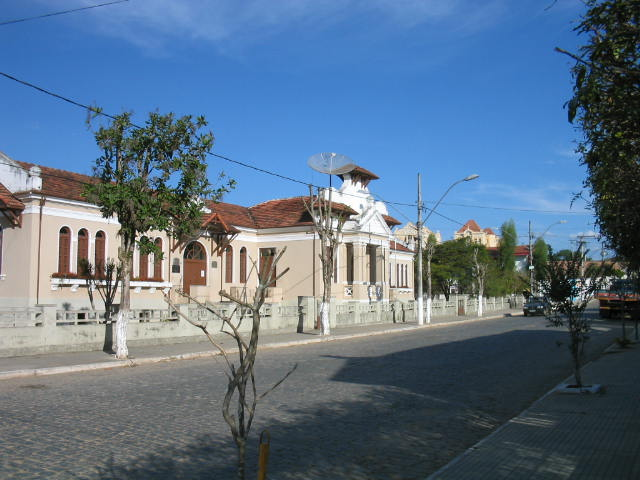
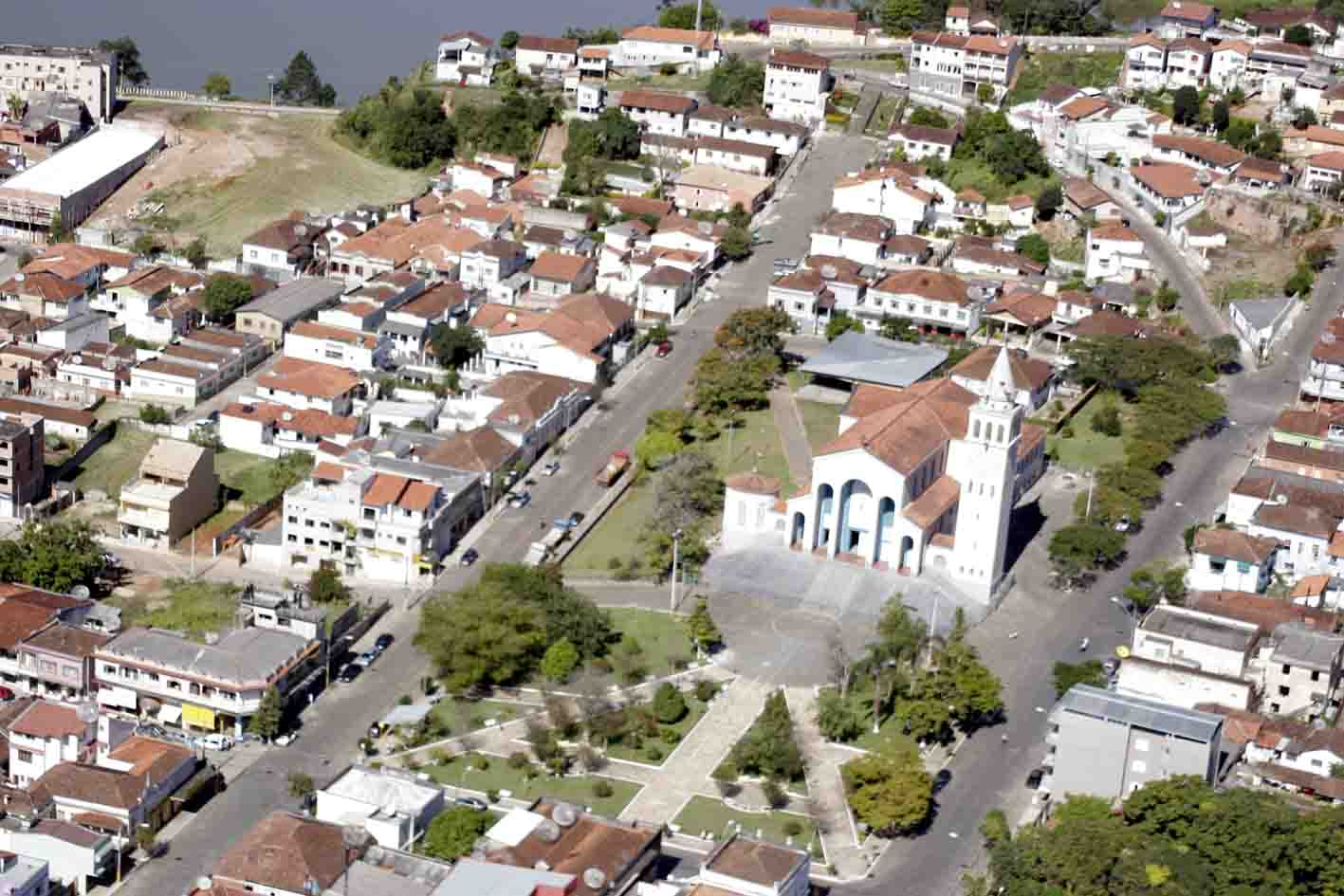
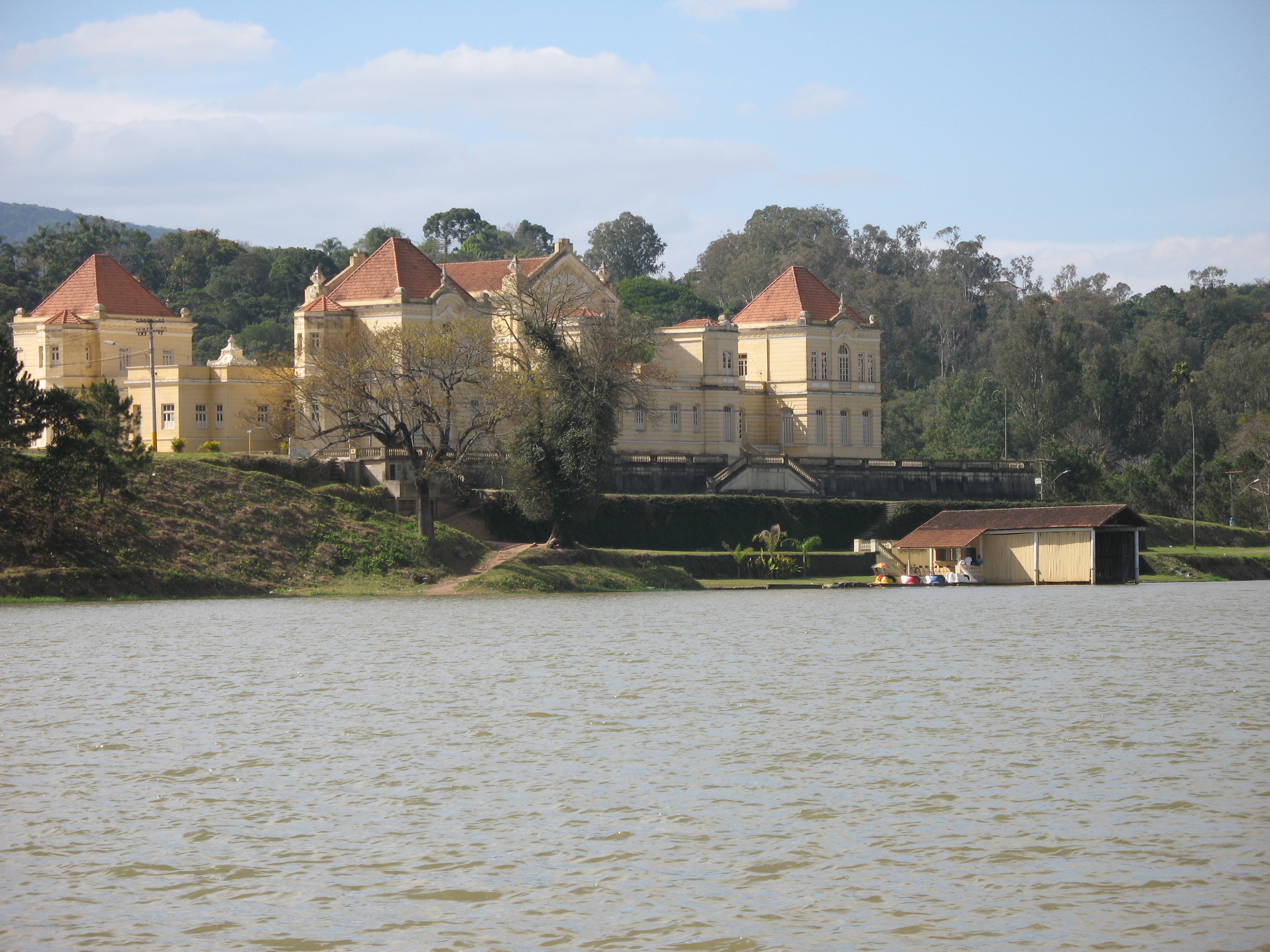
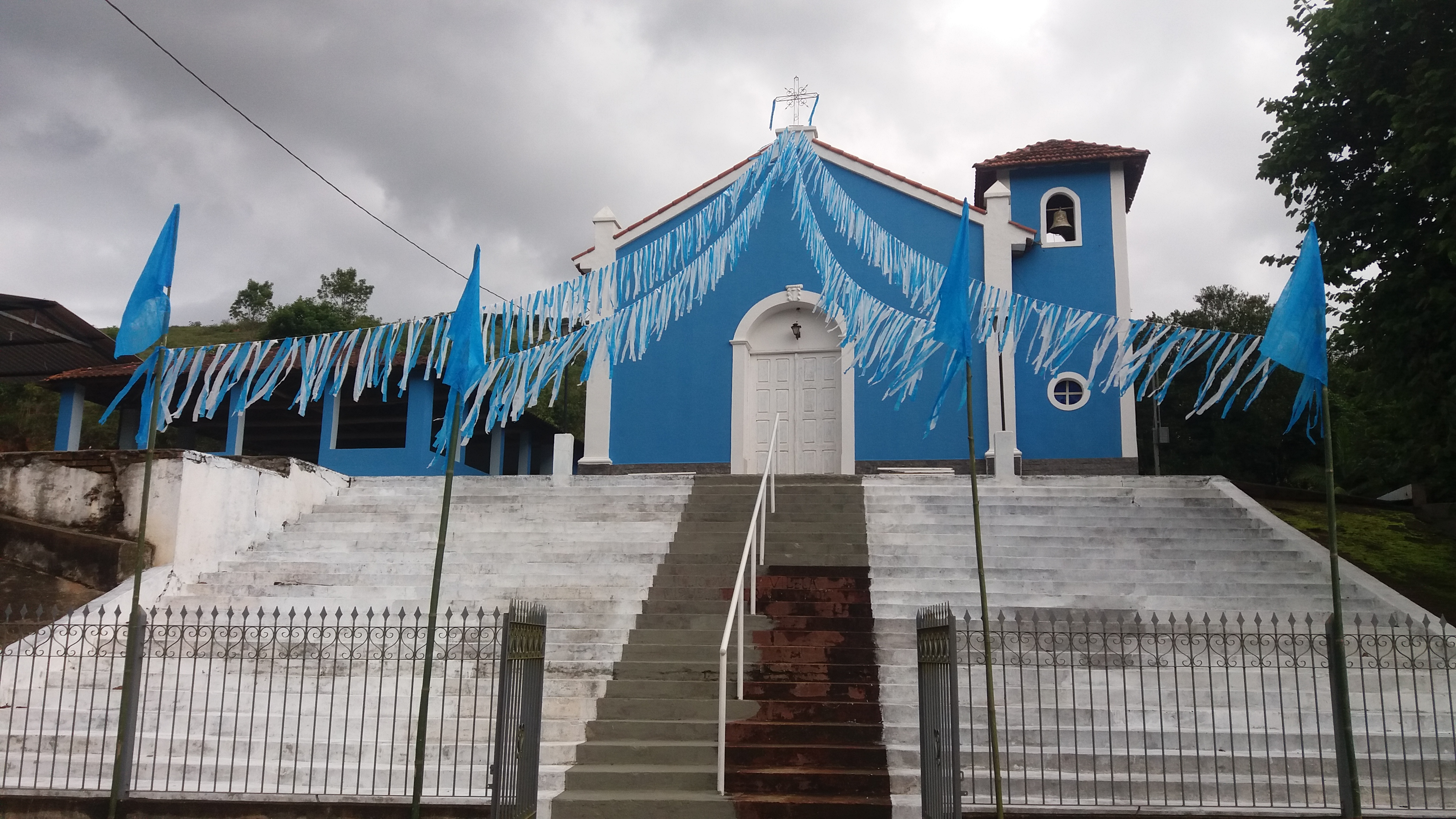
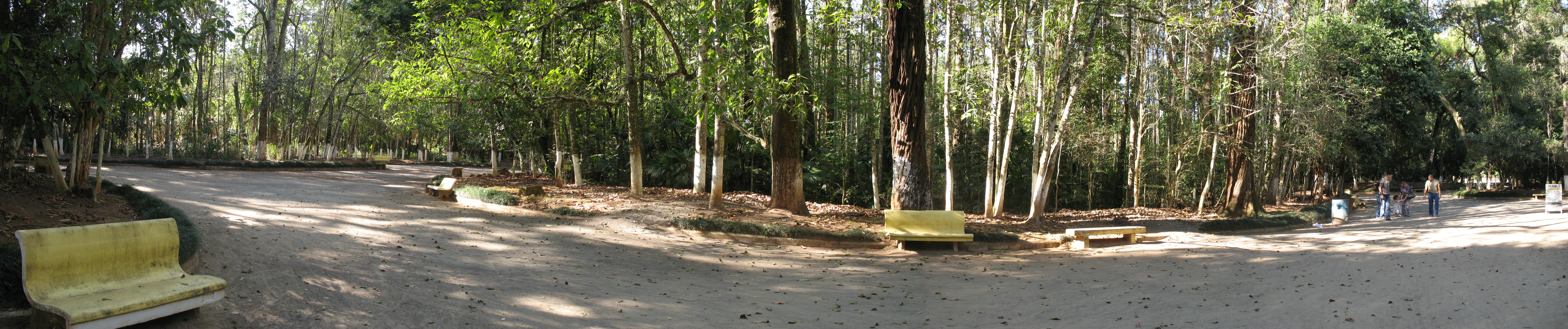

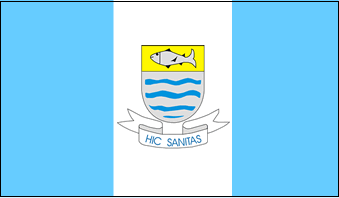
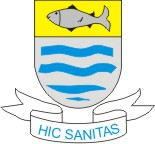
- Flag Coat of arms
- Nickname: The city of the virtuous waters
- Motto: Latin: Hic Sanitas (Here exits health)
- Location in Minas Gerais

- Location in Brazil
- Coordinates: 21°58′33″S 45°21′00″W
- Country: Brazil
- Region: Southeast
- State: Minas Gerais
- Mesoregion: South and Southwest of Minas Gerais
- Microregion: São Lourenço
- Incorporated (municipality): September 16, 1901

Government
  - Mayor: Leonardo Framil Lobo

Area
  - Total: 82,293 sq mi (213,139 km^{2})
- Elevation: 2,910 ft (887 m)

Population (2020)
  - Total: 20,907
- Time zone: UTC−3 (BRT)
- CEP postal code: 37480-000
- Area codes: +55 35
- HDI (2010): 0.711 – high
- Website: www.lambari.mg.gov.br

Lambari is a municipality in the state of Minas Gerais in the Southeast region of Brazil.

The municipality contains the 214-hectare (530-acre) Nova Baden State Park, created in 1994.

== Geography ==
=== Climate ===
Climate data for Lambari (1981–2010)
Month	Jan	Feb	Mar	Apr	May	Jun	Jul	Aug	Sep	Oct	Nov	Dec	Year
Mean daily maximum °C (°F)	29.5 (85.1)	30.1 (86.2)	29.4 (84.9)	28.2 (82.8)	25.5 (77.9)	24.3 (75.7)	24.8 (76.6)	26.8 (80.2)	27.6 (81.7)	28.8 (83.8)	29.2 (84.6)	29.0 (84.2)	27.8 (82.0)
Daily mean °C (°F)	22.2 (72.0)	22.2 (72.0)	21.4 (70.5)	19.4 (66.9)	16.0 (60.8)	14.0 (57.2)	13.8 (56.8)	15.1 (59.2)	17.9 (64.2)	20.0 (68.0)	20.9 (69.6)	21.7 (71.1)	18.7 (65.7)
Mean daily minimum °C (°F)	16.9 (62.4)	16.4 (61.5)	15.6 (60.1)	12.9 (55.2)	9.1 (48.4)	6.4 (43.5)	6.0 (42.8)	6.4 (43.5)	10.5 (50.9)	13.3 (55.9)	14.8 (58.6)	16.2 (61.2)	12.0 (53.6)
Average precipitation mm (inches)	319.2 (12.57)	205.0 (8.07)	196.2 (7.72)	89.6 (3.53)	60.4 (2.38)	31.7 (1.25)	25.1 (0.99)	19.2 (0.76)	95.2 (3.75)	121.3 (4.78)	189.3 (7.45)	302.1 (11.89)	1,654.3 (65.13)
Average precipitation days (≥ 1.0 mm)	17	13	13	6	4	3	2	3	7	10	12	17	107
Average relative humidity (%)	84.0	83.4	84.0	85.2	88.0	88.8	87.0	82.0	80.2	80.1	81.4	83.9	84.0
Mean monthly sunshine hours	123.4	130.6	124.9	156.0	159.6	170.3	175.4	184.1	120.3	122.4	134.1	111.3	1,712.4
Source: Instituto Nacional de Meteorologia

== Notable people ==
- Neilor, footballer

== See also ==
- List of municipalities in Minas Gerais
