= Joel Silveira =

Brazilian journalist and writer (1918–2007)

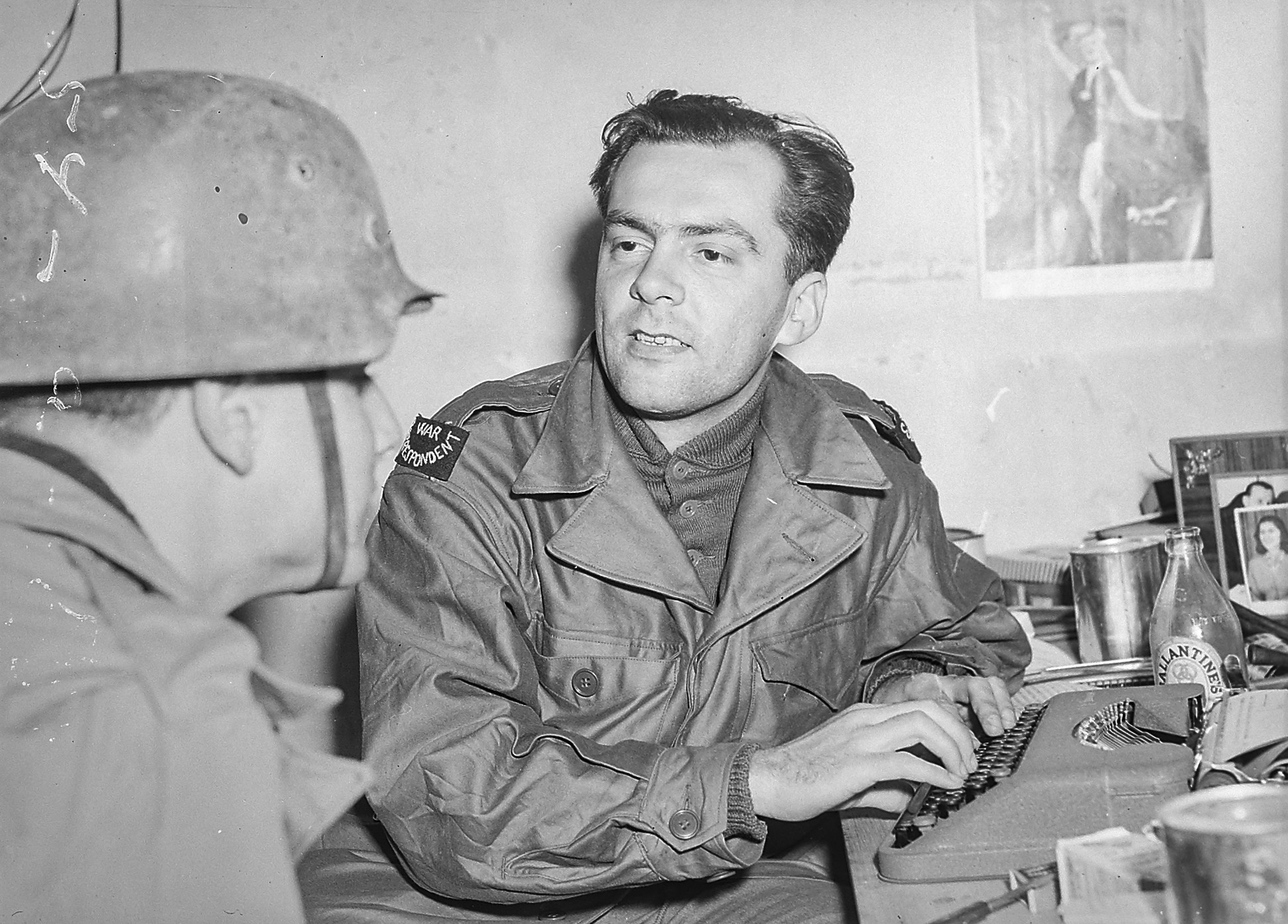
- Joel Silveira interviewing a German prisoner in Italy.
- Born: 23 September 1918; Lagarto, Sergipe, Brazil
- Died: 15 August 2007 (aged 88); Rio de Janeiro
- Occupations: Journalist; Writer; War correspondent

Joel Silveira (23 September 1918 – 15 August 2007) was a Brazilian writer and journalist. Silveira was a war correspondent in Europe during World War II, following the Brazilian Expeditionary Force. He became known for his investigative news stories, and incisive personality; Assis Chateaubriand nicknamed him "a víbora" (the viper).

== Life and career ==
Silveira was born in Lagarto in 1918. He moved to Rio de Janeiro in 1937 to study Law, but dropped out after the second year of college. His first job was at the weekly newspaper Dom Casmurro, after that, Silveira was reporter and secretary of the leftist Diretrizes magazine, directed by Samuel Wainer, where he stayed until the magazine closure by Vargas' Department of Press and Propaganda (DIP), in 1944. Silveira's stories "Eram Assim os Grã-Finos em São Paulo" ("That's How the Upper Class in São Paulo Was)" and "A Milésima Segunda Noite da Avenida Paulista" ("The Thousandth Second Night of Paulista Avenue") became classics of Brazilian journalism. He also wrote for Diários Associados, Última Hora, O Estado de S. Paulo, Diário de Notícias, Correio da Manhã, and Manchete.

Silveira was chosen by Assis Chateaubriand to be a war correspondent following the Brazilian expeditionaries during World War II, despite opposition by the DIP and then-Minister of War General Eurico Dutra.

After the 1964 coup d'état, he was arrested twice, during the Castelo Branco government and five times during the Médici government. "Three by the Army, one by the Navy and the other by the Air Force, but just for a day." They asked me some questions and they sent me away. The questions were always the same, a stupid thing: "Are you a Communist?" I said, "I'm not a communist, I do not belong to the Communist Party. You are tired of knowing that I am socialist, democratic."

Silveira published around 40 books. He was awarded the Machado de Assis lifetime achievement award from the Academia Brasileira de Letras, in 1998. He also won the Líbero Badaró, Esso Especial, Jabuti and Golfinho de Ouro (Golden Dolphin) awards.

Joel Silveira lived in Copacabana, Rio de Janeiro, until his death, in 2007.

== Selected books ==
=== Non-fiction ===
- O inverno da guerra (Objetiva, 2005)
- Diário do último dinossauro (Travessa dos Editores, 2004)
- A feijoada que derrubou o governo (Companhia das Letras, 2004)
- A milésima segunda noite da Avenida Paulista (Companhia das Letras, 2003)
- Memórias de alegria (Mauad, 2001)
- A camisa do senador (Mauad, 2000)
- Na fogueira: memórias (Mauad, 1998)
- Viagem com o presidente eleito (Mauad, 1996)
- Nitroglicerina pura (Record, 1996), co-author G. Moraes Neto
- II Guerra: momentos críticos (Mauad, 1995)
- Guerrilha noturna (Record, 1994)
- Conspiração na madrugada (José Olympio, 1993)
- Presidente no jardim (Record, 1991)
- Segunda Guerra Mundial (Espaço e Tempo, 1989)
- O pacto maldito (Record, 1989)
- Você nunca será um deles (Record, 1988)
- Tempo de contar (Record, 1985)
- A Luta dos pracinhas (Record, 1983), em co-autoria com T. Mitke
- As duas guerras da FEB (Idade Nova Ed., 1965)

=== Fiction ===
- Os melhores contos de Joel Silveira (Global, 1998)
- Não foi o que você pediu? (José Olympio, 1991)
- O dia em que o leão morreu (Record, 1986)
- Dias de luto (Record, 1985)
