= Peirópolis =

Paleontological museum located in Uberaba, Brazil

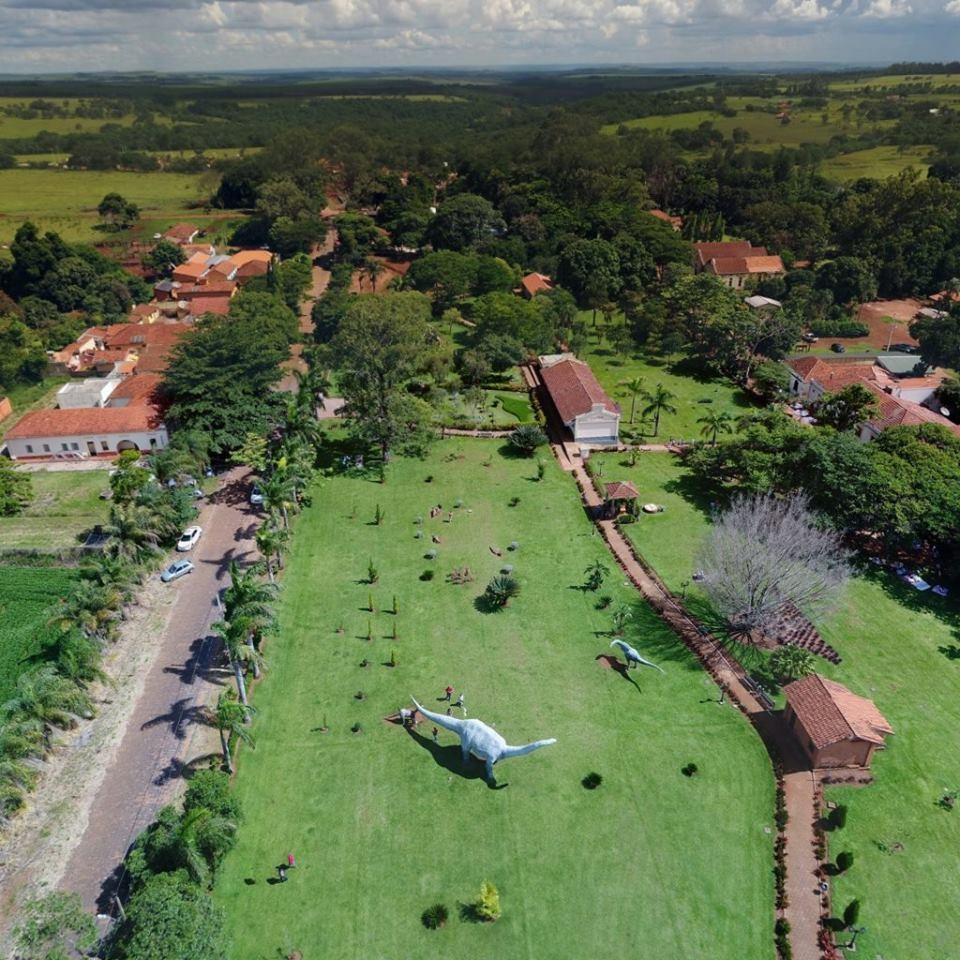
- Aerial view of Peirópolis.
- Interactive map of Peirópolis
- Location: Uberaba, Minas Gerais, Brazil
- Coordinates: 19°44′38″S 47°44′35″W

Peirópolis is a rural district located within the municipality of Uberaba, in the western region of Minas Gerais, southeastern Brazil. The area is known for its paleontological discoveries dating back to the Late Cretaceous period, specifically the Maastrichtian stage.

The area is characterized by the Serra da Galga Formation, part of the Bauru Group, which contains fossil remains of crocodylomorphs, sauropods, and other extinct species, along with the Peirópolis and Serra da Galga paleontological sites.

== History ==
Peirópolis was named after Frederico Peiró (1859–1911), who settled in the area in 1896 due to the local abundance of limestone. Soon after settling, Peiró established lime kilns for producing quicklime and storage warehouses for grain from the surrounding region, which was still referred to as "Paineiras" at the time. By 1889, the Mogiana Railway Company had extended its tracks to Uberaba, which led Peiró to establish a local railway station for dispatching products to the state of São Paulo.

After Peiró's death in 1911, the local railway station was renamed "Cambará." In 1924, it was further renamed "Peirópolis" at the request of local residents to honor Peiró’s legacy in the area. The station continued to operate until 1970, when the depletion of limestone and a fatal railway accident near the village that year led to disruptions in train services, resulting in its closure in 1971.

== Paleontology ==
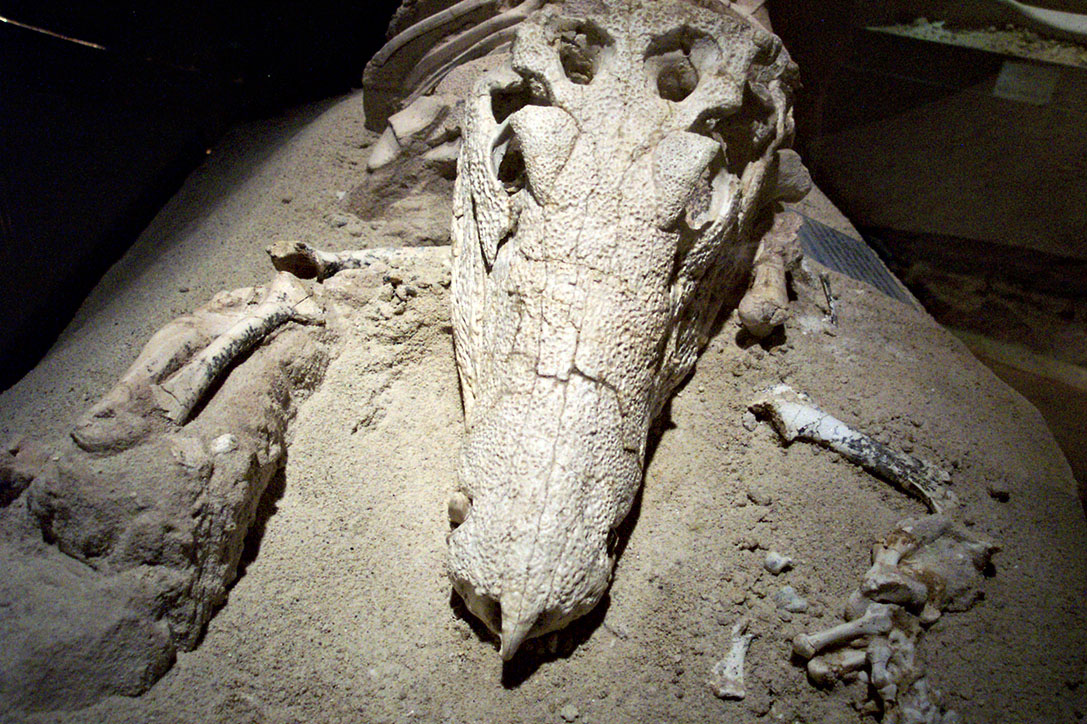
The fossil of Uberabasuchus terrificus unearthed at Peirópolis.

The first fossil discovered in the region was unearthed in 1945 during railway realignment work and identified as a femur from a dinosaur belonging to the Titanosauridae family. This find drew interest from the National Department of Mineral Production (DNPM), leading paleontologist Llewellyn Ivor Price to visit the site for further study. In 1946, Price discovered a 15 cm round fossilized eggshell, later identified as belonging to a sauropod. Following this, Price conducted extensive excavations in Peirópolis, and the fossils recovered were sent to the DNPM’s headquarters in Rio de Janeiro.

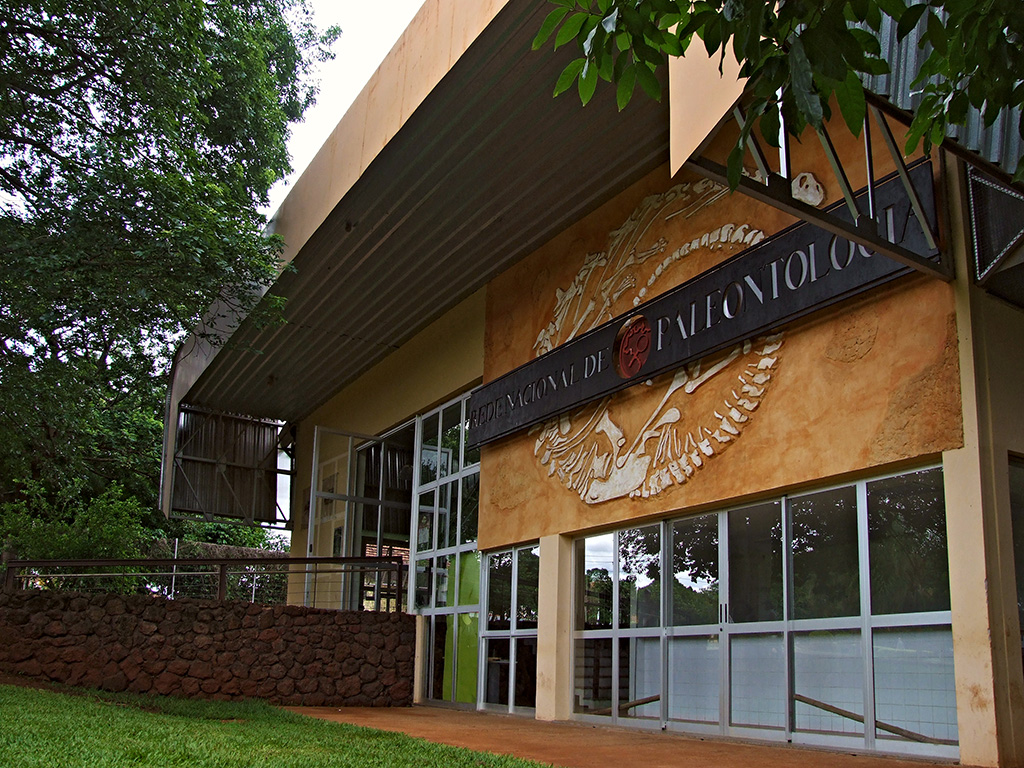
Former headquarters of Rede Nacional de Paleontologia (lit: National Paleontology Network), later integrated into the Cultural and Scientific Complex of Peirópolis.

During the 1980s, supporters of scientific causes and local residents initiated a non-governmental project aimed at preserving Peirópolis as a dedicated research site for its geological and paleontological heritage. Following the initiative, the area was officially demarcated by the DNPM in 1988. In 1991, the Paleontological Research Center Llewellyn Ivor Price and the Dinosaur Museum of Peirópolis were established, with the museum occupying the building of the village's former railway station.

In 2003, the Brazilian federal government allocated funding for the construction of the Rede Nacional de Paleontologia (English: National Paleontology Network) headquarters in the district, aimed at preserving fossil sites and promoting local paleontology, but the project was canceled due to funding issues. In 2011, the remaining facilities were assumed by the Universidade Federal do Triângulo Mineiro (Federal University of Triângulo Mineiro) and integrated into its academic unit, the Cultural and Scientific Complex of Peirópolis.

In actuality, the Paleontological Research Center and the Dinosaur Museum serves as institutions for paleontological investigations in Brazil, which fosters collaborations among other national and international paleontological institutions, including publication of scholarly articles. The museum hosts exhibitions on local paleontology, catering to both scientific and educational audiences. It also houses a collection of over 1,500 fossils unearthed from the surrounding area.

Discoveries in the area include titanosaurs Uberabatitan ribeiroi, Trigonosaurus pricei and Baurutitan britoi, crocodyliforms Uberabasuchus terrificus, Peirosaurus tormini, and Itasuchus jesuinoi, podocnemids Peiropemys mezzalirai and Pricemys caiera, the ground sloth Eremotherium laurillardi, and the anura Uberabatrachus carvalhoi.

== See also ==
- Paleontology
