= Uberaba =

Municipality in Minas Gerais, Brazil

- Municipality
- Municipality of Uberaba
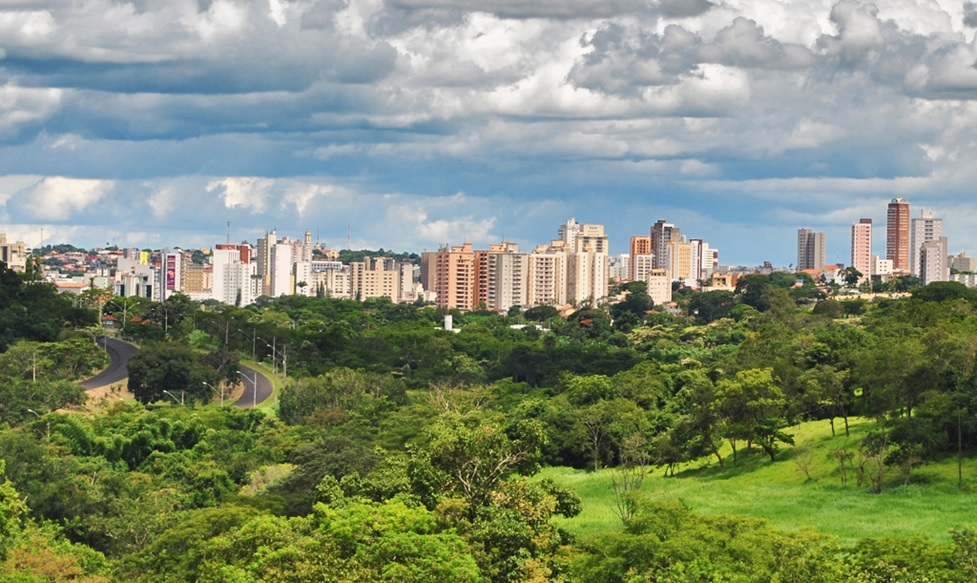
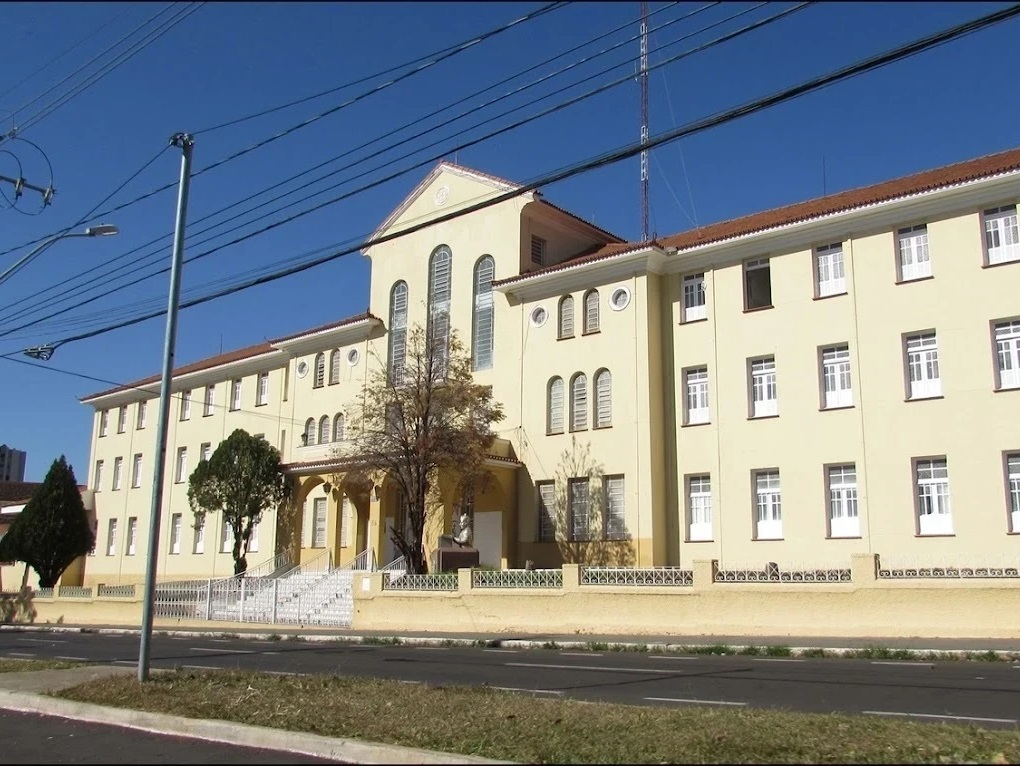
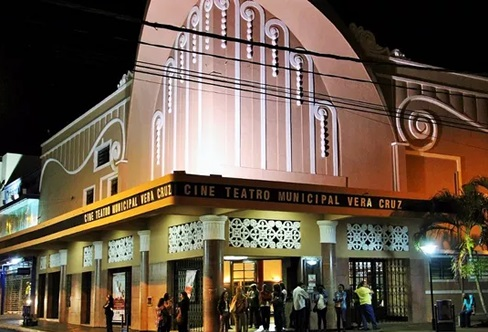
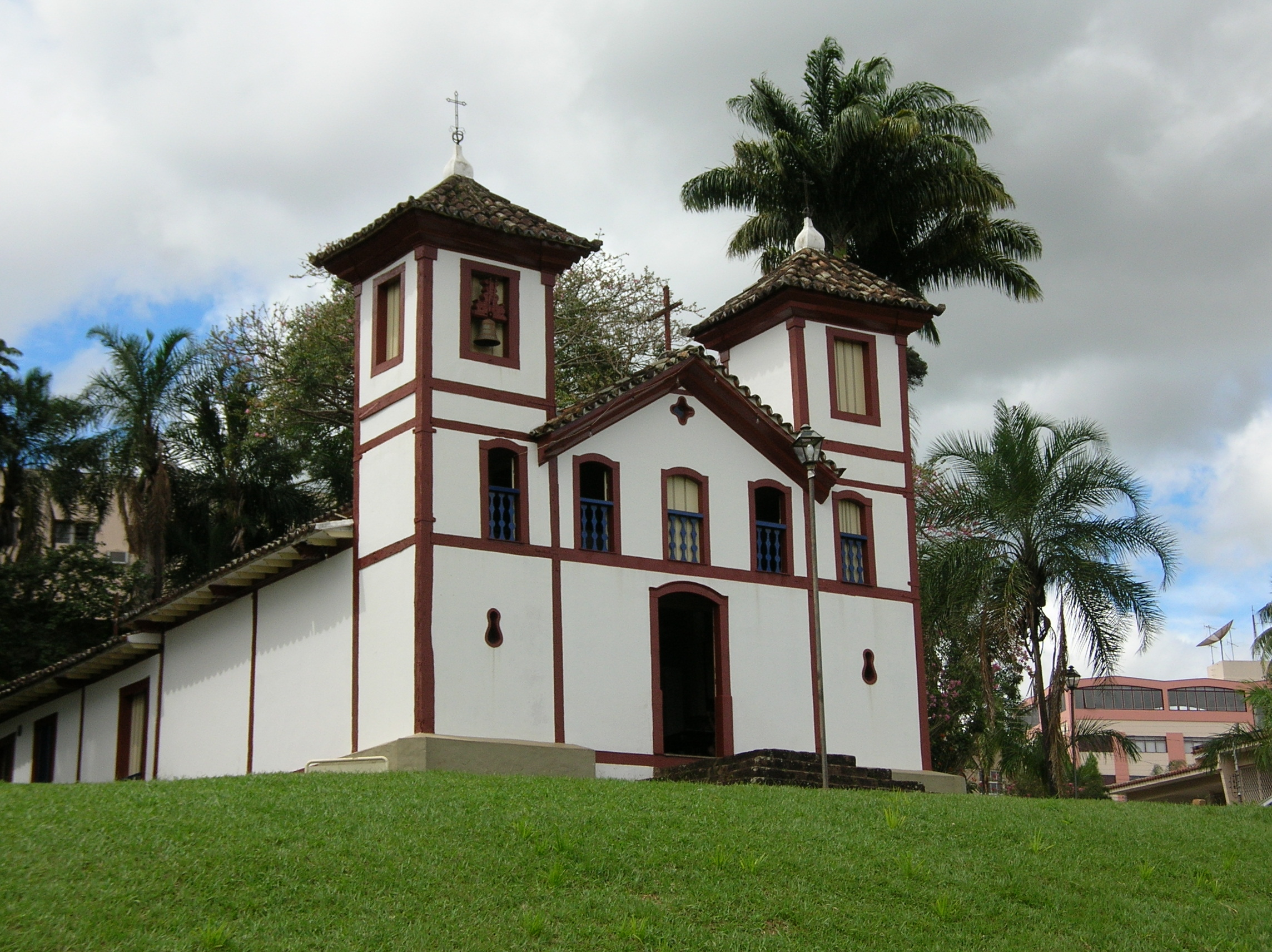
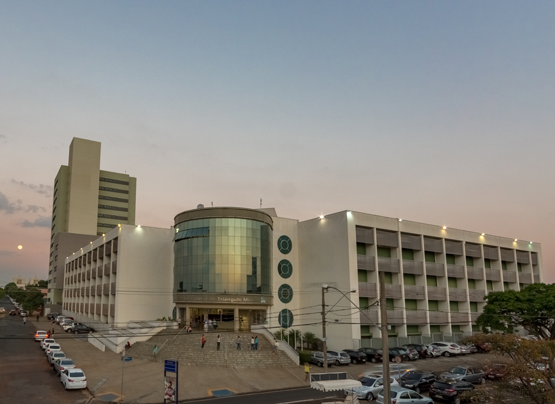
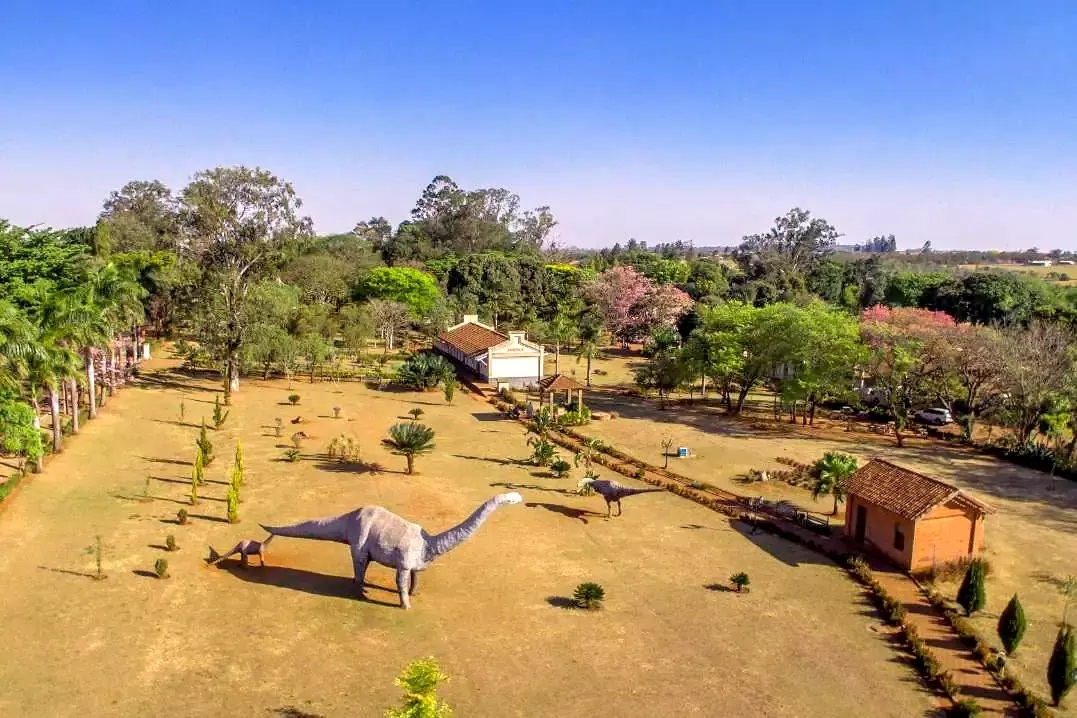
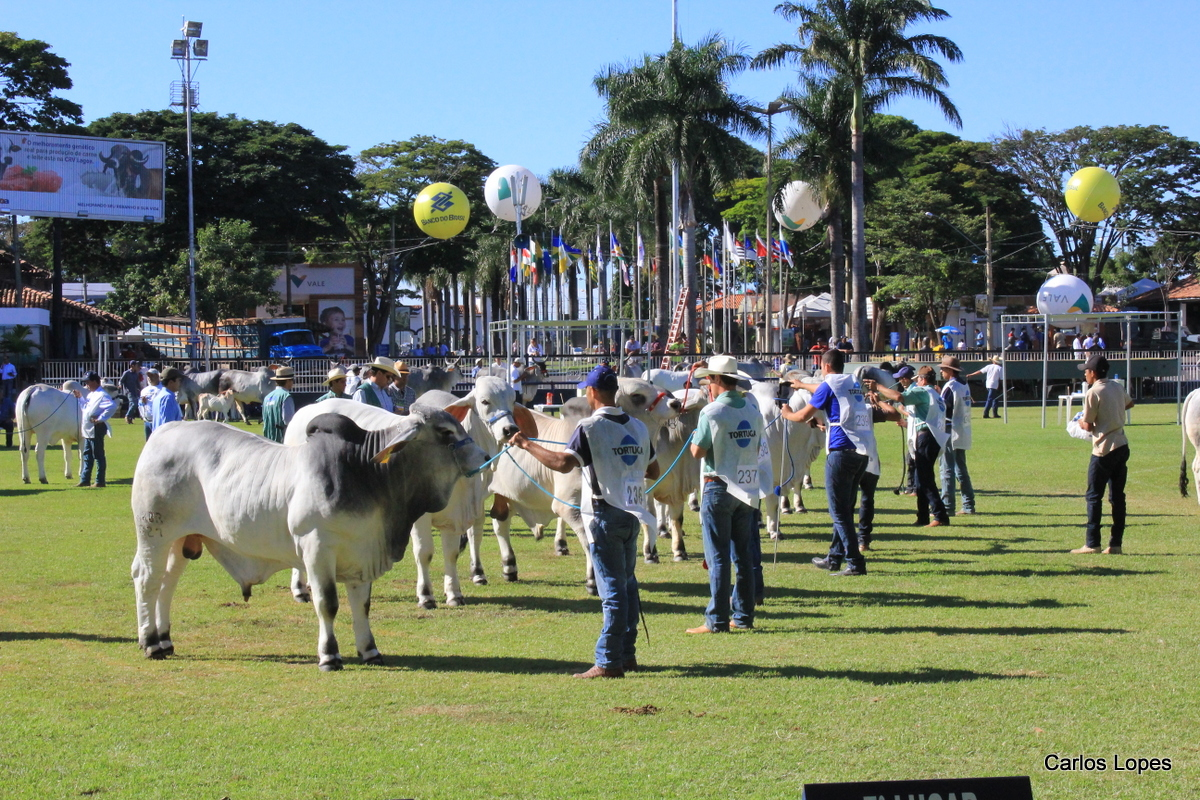
- From top and left to right: View of Uberaba; Archdiocese of Uberaba; Vera Cruz Municipal Theater; Museum of Sacred Art; Federal University of Triângulo Mineiro; Peirópolis; Expozebu.

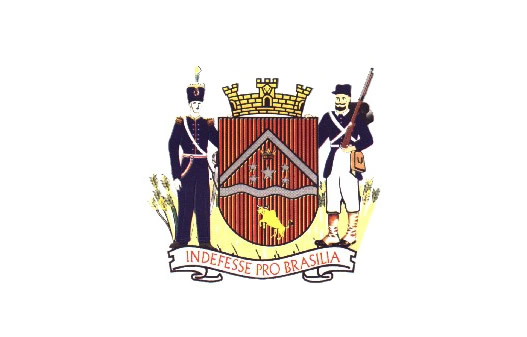
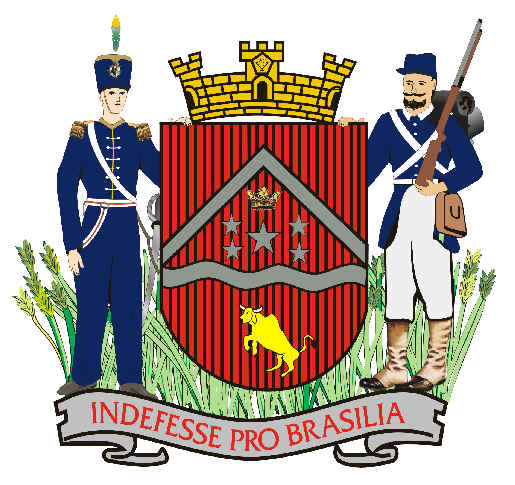
- Flag Coat of arms
- Motto: Indefesse pro Brasilia! (Latin); Unflagging for Brazil!
- Location in Minas Gerais

- Localization of Uberaba in Brazil
- Coordinates: 19°44′52″S 47°55′55″W
- Country: Brazil
- Region: Southeast
- State: Minas Gerais
- Founded: 2 March 1820

Government
  - Mayor: Elisa Gonçalves de Araujo (2021) (SD)

Area
  - Total: 4,529.7 km^{2} (1,748.9 sq mi)
- Elevation: 823 m (2,700 ft)

Population (2025)
  - Total: 356,781
  - Density: 78.86/km^{2} (204.2/sq mi)
- Time zone: UTC−3 (BRT)
  - Summer (DST): UTC−2 (BRST)
- Postal Code: 38000-000
- Area code: +55 34
- HDI (2010): 0.772 – high
- Website: www.uberaba.mg.gov.br

Uberaba (Portuguese pronunciation: [ubeˈɾabɐ]) is a municipality in the state of Minas Gerais, Brazil. It is located in the Brazilian Highlands at an elevation of 823 metres (2,700 ft) above sea level on the Uberaba River, and is situated 418 kilometres (260 mi) from the state capital, Belo Horizonte. The city was granted its status in 1856 and derives its name from the Tupi language, meaning "bright water". As of 2022, the population was 337,836 inhabitants, making it the 7th-most populous city in Minas Gerais.

== History ==
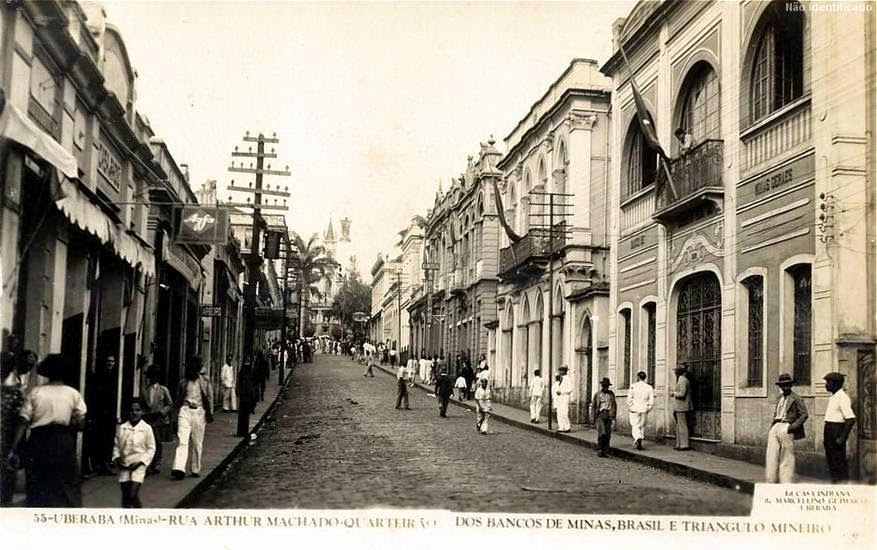
Uberaba circa 1930.

The history of Uberaba traces its origins back to 1810, when Captain Major Eustaquio founded a settlement near the ancient Anhanguera route, which was more commonly referred to back then as the "Goyazes road". This settlement served as a resting point for both locals and travelers who passed through or arrived there during the 19th century. Its strategic location and function as a crossroads prompted local farmers to engage in crop cultivation and cattle domestication for commercial purposes, leading to the establishment of a robust livestock network in the region.

Initially a part of the Captaincy of Goias, the territory of Uberaba was incorporated into the Captaincy of Minas Gerais in 1816. It gained recognition as a parish in 1820 and was officially designated as a city in 1856.

In 1889, the inaugural railway station was established due to the expansion of the Mogiana Railway from the neighboring municipality of Sacramento. The introduction of the railway system boosted the economy of Uberaba in the subsequent years.

Currently, Uberaba is known for its lively livestock and agribusiness events. As an industrial hub, the city functions as a regional center for culture, commerce, and entertainment, hosting a diverse array of institutions, markets, and entertainment venues. The municipality includes the rural district of Peirópolis, known for its paleontological site. This area features the Paleontological Research Center Llewellyn Ivor Price and a museum dedicated to local fossil discoveries.

On 27 March 2024, Uberaba gained recognition from UNESCO as a global geopark.

== Geography ==
=== Climate ===
Uberaba has a Tropical climate (Aw) with an average annual temperature of 21.9 °C (71.4 °F). The highest temperature ever recorded was 40.2 °C (105.2 °F) in October, while the lowest recorded temperature was −2.2 °C (28.0 °F) in July.

Precipitation occurs on an average of 86 days per year, with the highest amount in December and the lowest in July.

Climate data for Uberaba (1991–2020 normals, extremes 1961–present)
Month	Jan	Feb	Mar	Apr	May	Jun	Jul	Aug	Sep	Oct	Nov	Dec	Year
Record high °C (°F)	37.1 (98.8)	36.5 (97.7)	36.7 (98.1)	35.1 (95.2)	34.0 (93.2)	32.5 (90.5)	33.7 (92.7)	36.1 (97.0)	39.2 (102.6)	40.7 (105.3)	38.6 (101.5)	36.9 (98.4)	40.7 (105.3)
Mean daily maximum °C (°F)	30.0 (86.0)	30.6 (87.1)	30.3 (86.5)	30.0 (86.0)	28.0 (82.4)	27.5 (81.5)	28.0 (82.4)	30.1 (86.2)	31.4 (88.5)	31.8 (89.2)	30.3 (86.5)	30.1 (86.2)	29.8 (85.6)
Daily mean °C (°F)	23.8 (74.8)	23.9 (75.0)	23.6 (74.5)	22.6 (72.7)	20.0 (68.0)	19.0 (66.2)	19.1 (66.4)	21.1 (70.0)	23.2 (73.8)	24.2 (75.6)	23.8 (74.8)	23.8 (74.8)	22.3 (72.1)
Mean daily minimum °C (°F)	19.6 (67.3)	19.3 (66.7)	19.2 (66.6)	17.5 (63.5)	14.3 (57.7)	13.1 (55.6)	12.8 (55.0)	14.1 (57.4)	16.8 (62.2)	18.5 (65.3)	19.0 (66.2)	19.6 (67.3)	17.0 (62.6)
Record low °C (°F)	13.0 (55.4)	14.6 (58.3)	10.0 (50.0)	5.6 (42.1)	2.6 (36.7)	−0.2 (31.6)	−2.2 (28.0)	2.0 (35.6)	0.8 (33.4)	6.2 (43.2)	10.2 (50.4)	11.5 (52.7)	−2.2 (28.0)
Average precipitation mm (inches)	328.2 (12.92)	228.3 (8.99)	241.4 (9.50)	94.9 (3.74)	49.6 (1.95)	21.9 (0.86)	9.6 (0.38)	14.6 (0.57)	53.1 (2.09)	130.9 (5.15)	203.4 (8.01)	282.2 (11.11)	1,658.1 (65.28)
Average precipitation days (≥ 1.0 mm)	18.3	14.8	16.1	7.0	3.6	2.2	1.1	1.5	5.3	8.5	13.1	17.3	108.8
Average relative humidity (%)	78.1	76.4	77.2	72.5	70.2	67.1	59.9	50.8	54.4	61.4	71.0	76.6	68.0
Average dew point °C (°F)	20.1 (68.2)	20.0 (68.0)	19.9 (67.8)	18.3 (64.9)	15.4 (59.7)	13.8 (56.8)	12.2 (54.0)	11.6 (52.9)	14.0 (57.2)	16.8 (62.2)	18.8 (65.8)	19.9 (67.8)	16.7 (62.1)
Mean monthly sunshine hours	176.3	186.0	199.0	233.3	249.7	246.4	264.8	277.9	228.1	225.4	194.7	179.1	2,660.7
Source 1: NOAA
Source 2: National Institute of Meteorology (INMET)

== Demographics ==
Uberaba is the primary municipality in the Intermediate Geographic Region of Uberaba. In 2021, the Immediate Geographic Region of Uberaba comprised 10 municipalities spanning an area of 14,281.652 km^{2} (5,514.17 sq mi).

The 2022 Brazilian Census reported that Uberaba had a population of approximately 337,836 people, reflecting a 14% increase from the 2010 census. The population density was 74.68 people per square kilometer. Ethnically, 52.24% of Uberaba's population identified as white, 36.15% as mixed-race, and 11.21% as black.

Regarding household composition, 96.3% of the population lived in private households, while smaller percentages resided in non-institutionalized group quarters or were institutionalized.

== Economy ==
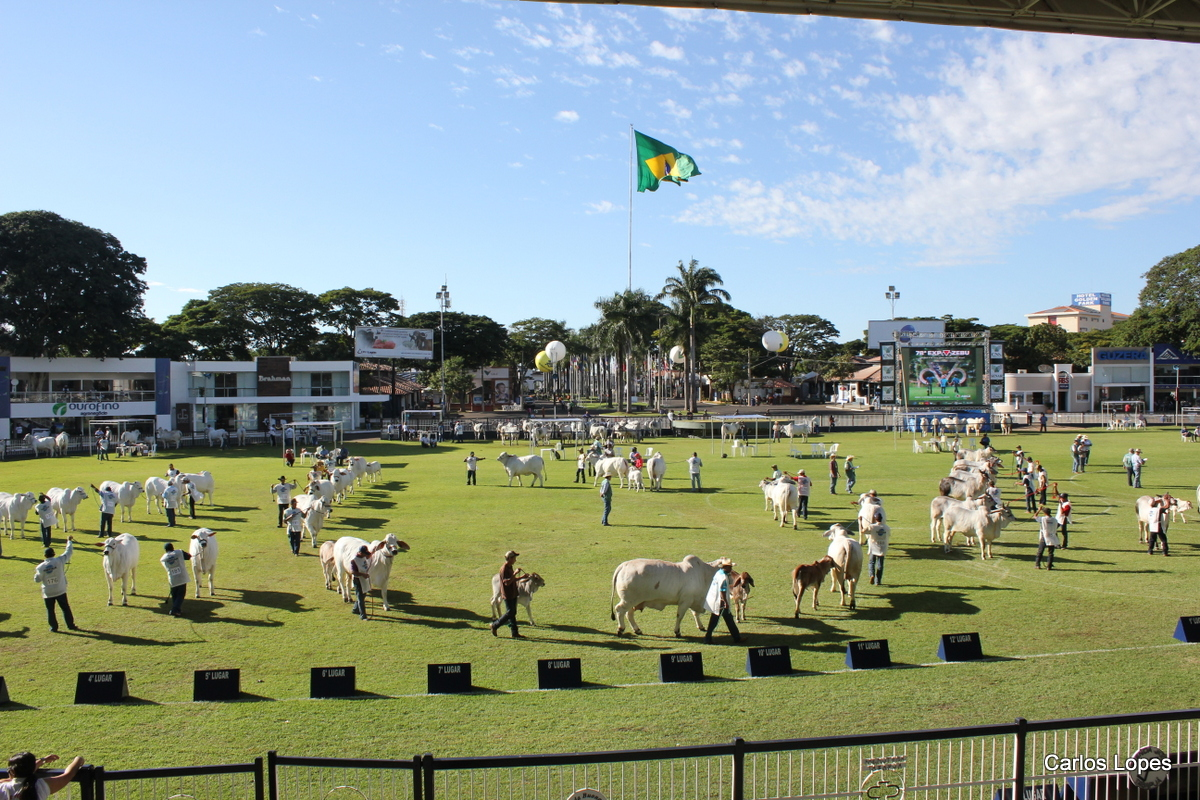
Cattle exhibition during the Expozebu fair.

Uberaba is an important grain producer in Minas Gerais, particularly known for corn, soybean, coffee, cotton, and sugarcane. The city is also recognized for hosting Expozebu, one of the largest cattle fairs in the world, held annually since 1935. From 2019 to 2024, Uberaba secured positions among the top 100 Brazilian cities with the highest agricultural production value, ranking 30th by 2024 according to the 2023 report from the Ministry of Agriculture and Livestock (MAPA).

The service sector employs slightly over half of the city's population, followed by the manufacturing industry, and agriculture ranking third. The industrial sector encompasses various fields such as agribusiness, food processing, textile manufacturing, steel production, mining, chemical manufacturing, electronic devices, home appliances, and more.

The chemical manufacturing sector is concentrated in the local industrial park, with processing plants operated by chemical companies, including Mosaic, FMC Corporation, Sipcam Nichino (UPL), and Yara. In 2021, the city ranked 62nd among the 100 largest economies in Brazil, with a GDP of R$ 20.3 billion and a GDP per capita of R$59,943.

In 2011, Petrobras selected Uberaba as the site for its UFN-5 (Nitrogen Fertilizer Unit 5), which was designed to connect to the Gasbol pipeline and produce 1,500 metric tons of ammonia daily. Construction of UFN-5 began in 2014 as part of the PAC-2, but was suspended in 2015 at 30% completion due to Petrobras' financial crisis, influenced by Operation Car Wash, and the company's redirection of resources to pre-salt oil fields. After listing the site for sale without a successful auction, the Government of Minas Gerais transferred it back to Uberaba in 2021 under a 20-year lease. In 2022, Atlas Agro signed a letter of intent to establish a sustainable nitrogen fertilizer facility at the location.

=== Crop Plantations (2006) ===
- Bananas: 28 hectares
- Coffee: 1,000 hectares
- Oranges: 1,410 hectares
- Tangerines: 168 hectares
- Cotton: 3,145 hectares
- Rice: 543 hectares
- Peanuts: 100 hectares
- Potatoes: 2,190 hectares
- Sugarcane: 36,000 hectares
- Onions: 450 hectares
- Beans: 1,450 hectares
- Cassava: 1,300 hectares
- Corn: 50,000 hectares
- Soybeans: 100,000 hectares
- Sorghum: 1,250 hectares
- Tomatoes: 240 hectares
- Wheat: 336 hectares

=== Farming Statistics (2006) ===
- Number of farms: 1,093
- Agricultural area: 282,692 ha.
- Planted area: 105,000 ha.
- Area of natural pasture: 112,678
- Workers directly employed by producers: 1,764
- Workers indirectly employed in the sector: 2,533

== Paleontology ==
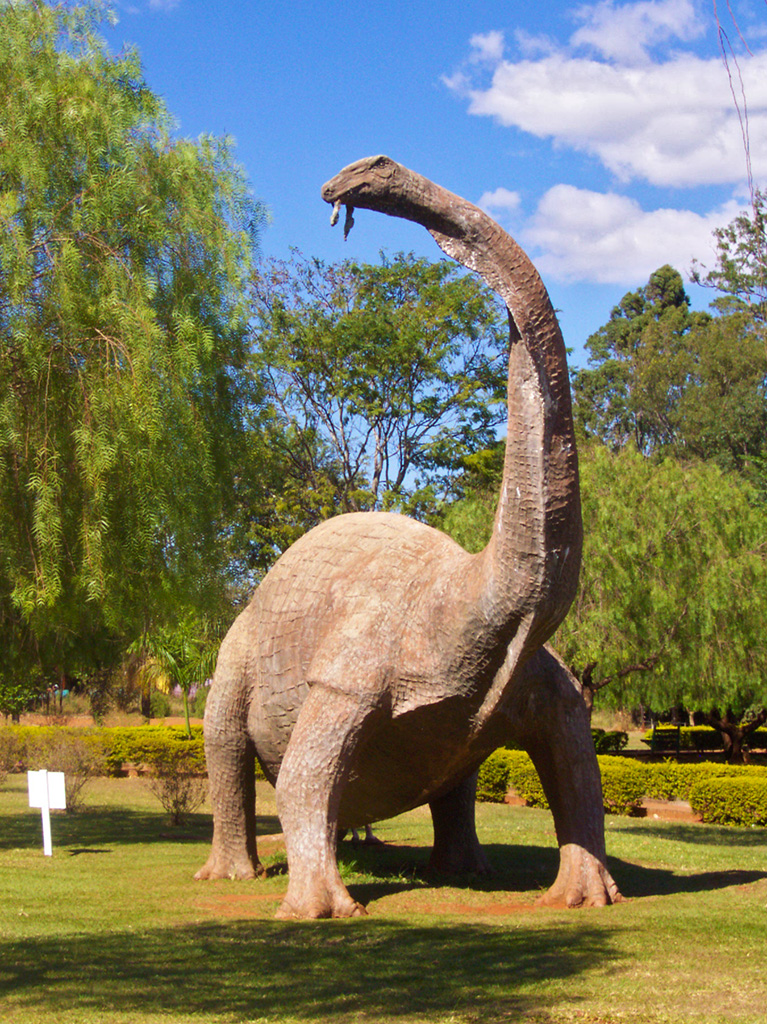
Replica of a titanosaur in Peirópolis.

Uberaba is recognized for housing a significant paleontological site in Brazil, boasting fossil records dating back approximately 80 to 66 million years, from the Late Cretaceous period.

The first paleontological discoveries in the territory were made by chance in 1945 when workers in the rural district of Peirópolis accidentally came across well-preserved fossils. Subsequently, paleontologist Llewellyn Ivor Price, associated with the National Department of Mineral Production (DNPM), conducted extensive scientific research in the region from 1947 until 1974, with Peirosaurus being one of Price's early findings in the area of the Serra da Galga Formation. The specimens collected during this period were later transferred to the Museum of Earth Sciences in Rio de Janeiro.

In 1991, it was established in Peirópolis, the Paleontological Research Center Llewellyn Ivor Price, locally known as the Centro de Pesquisas Paleontológicas Llewellyn Ivor Price. Currently, the research center collaborates with various national and international research institutions, and serves as a hub for paleontology in Brazil, focusing on understanding the fossil fauna and environments of the Late Cretaceous in the region, maintaining its own technical team for fossil preservation. As an integral part of the Research Center, The Dinosaur Museum aims to disseminate paleontological knowledge to the general public through interactive and educational exhibitions. The museum attracts an average of 100,000 visitors annually.

A geological survey conducted in 2022 identified 31 geosites and points of interest in Uberaba. Across the territory, over 10,000 prehistoric animal fossils have been documented, which includes sauropods, theropods, and velociraptors, along with various other specimens such as fishes, frogs, crocodyliforms, turtles, birds, mammals, mollusks, and the presence of trace fossils. Among the most notable discoveries is the Uberabatitan, unearthed in 2004.

== Transportation ==
Road access to Uberaba is provided by BR-050, connecting the city to the federal capital Brasília and São Paulo, as well as by BR-262, linking it to the state capital Belo Horizonte.

The railway system is managed by VLI Multimodal S.A., which operates the rail network linking the local intermodal terminal to the southeastern corridor of Ferrovia Centro-Atlântica. The corridor ultimately leads to the Port of Santos.

Air access is provided by Mário de Almeida Franco Airport.

== Notable people ==
- Alfredo Moser, inventor.
- Campos de Carvalho, writer.
- Chico Xavier, philanthropist and medium.
- Dinorá de Carvalho, pianist and conductor.
- Guga Foods, chef and YouTuber.
- Idelber Avelar, scholar.
- Jacob Palis, mathematician.
- Jean Dolabella, musician.
- Júlio Ximenes Sênior, military officer and scientist.
- Yuu Kamiya, novelist and illustrator.

== Sister cities ==
- Goiânia, Goiás, Brazil.
- Hyderabad, Telangana, India.
- Ongole, Andhra Pradesh, India.
- Reynosa, Tamaulipas, Mexico.

== See also ==
- List of municipalities in Minas Gerais
