= UFTM =

UFTM may refer to:

- Ulster Folk and Transport Museum, in Cultra, Northern Ireland
- Universidade Federal do Triângulo Mineiro, the Federal University of Triângulo Mineiro, a public university in Uberaba, Minas Gerais, Brazil

== See also ==
- Union for the Mediterranean (UfM), an intergovernmental organization.
