= Cemitério de São João Batista =

Cemetery in Rio de Janeiro, Brazil

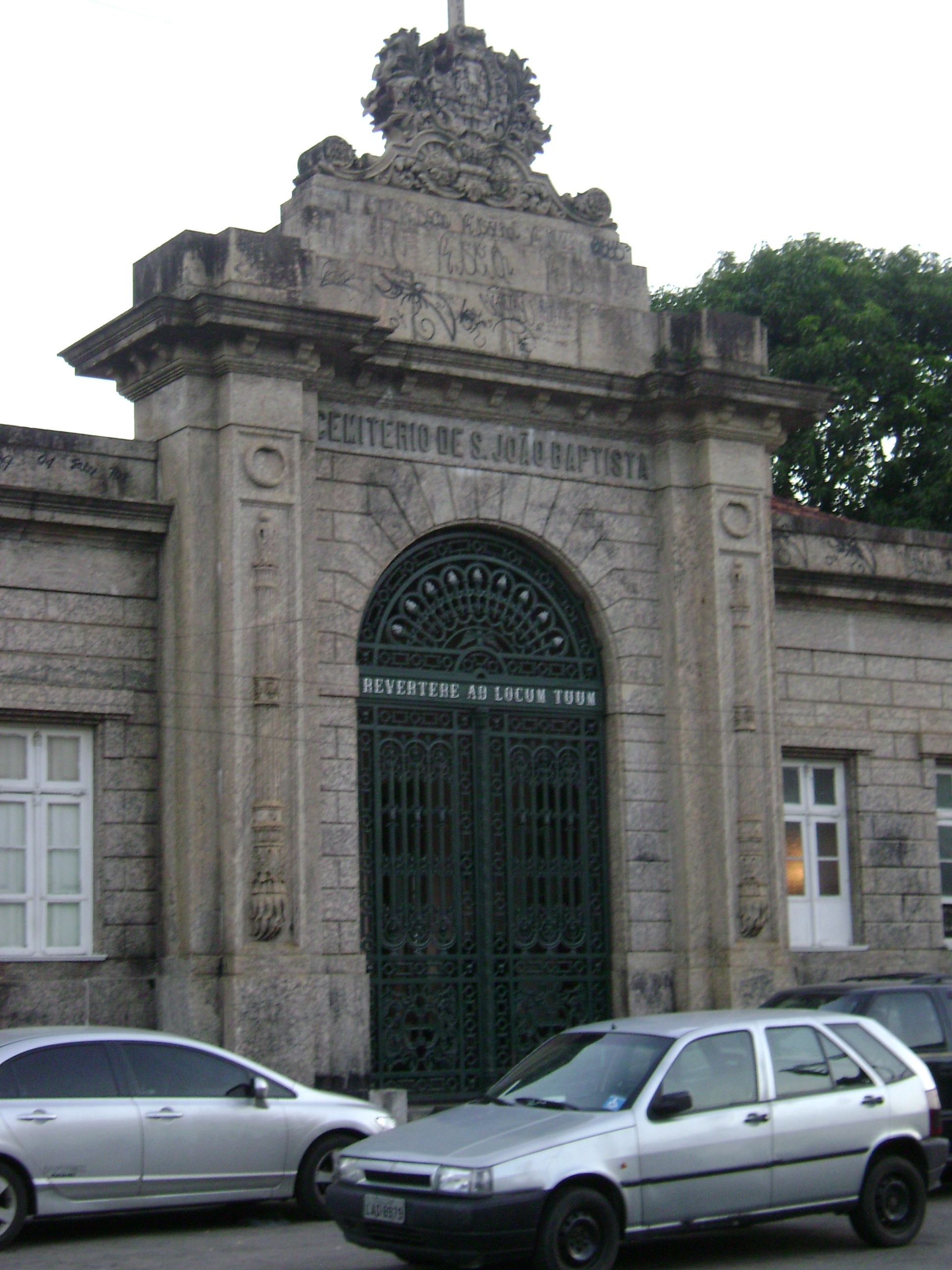
- Main entrance of the cemetery
- Interactive map of Cemitério de São João Batista

Details
- Established: 1852
- Location: Rio de Janeiro
- Country: Brazil
- Coordinates: 22.959°S 43.188°W
- Type: Public

The Cemitério de São João Batista (lit. 'Saint John the Baptist's Cemetery') is a municipal necropolis originally owned and operated by the Santa Casa da Misericórdia do Rio de Janeiro (Holy House of Mercy of Rio de Janeiro), and run, since August 2014, by the private company Rio Pax. It is sometimes referred to as Cemitério de São João Baptista, the alternate spelling seen over the main entrance gate.

Located in the neighborhood of Botafogo, it is the only cemetery in the city's south area, the Zona Sul, and, on 5 October 2015, it became the first cemetery in Latin America to be featured in Google Street View.

== Notable burials ==
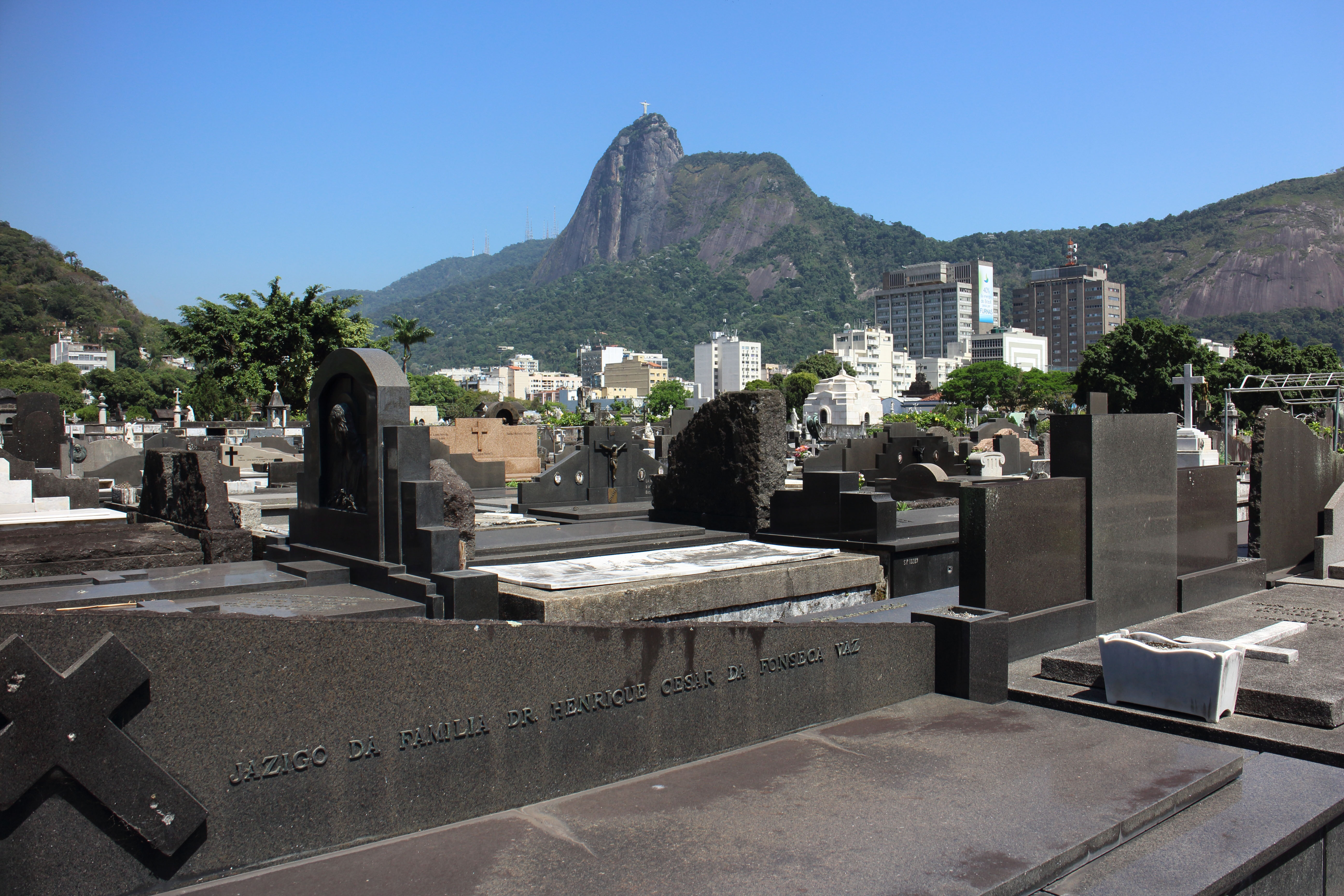
Partial view of the cemetery with the Christ the Redeemer statue in the background

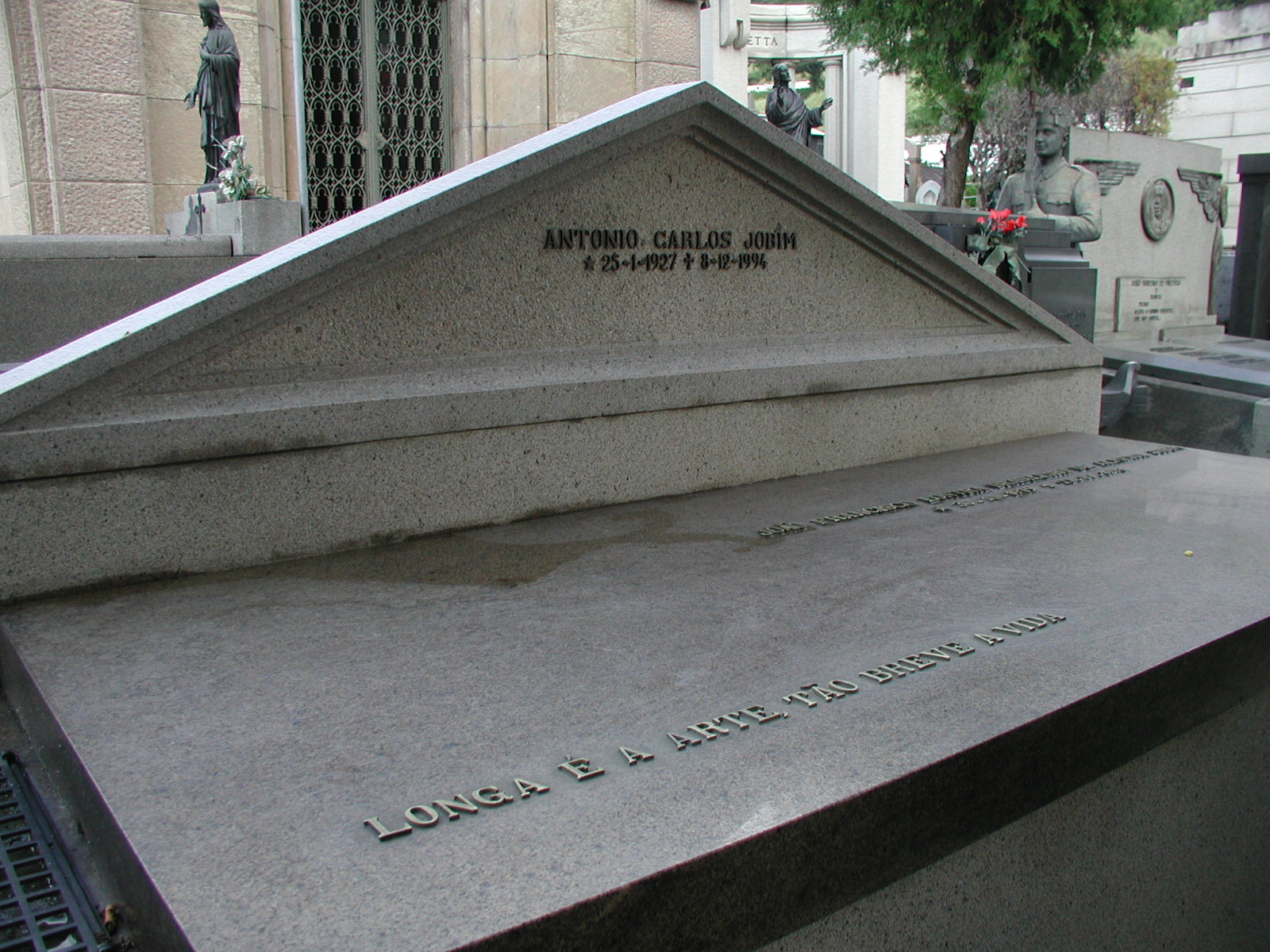
Grave of Tom Jobim

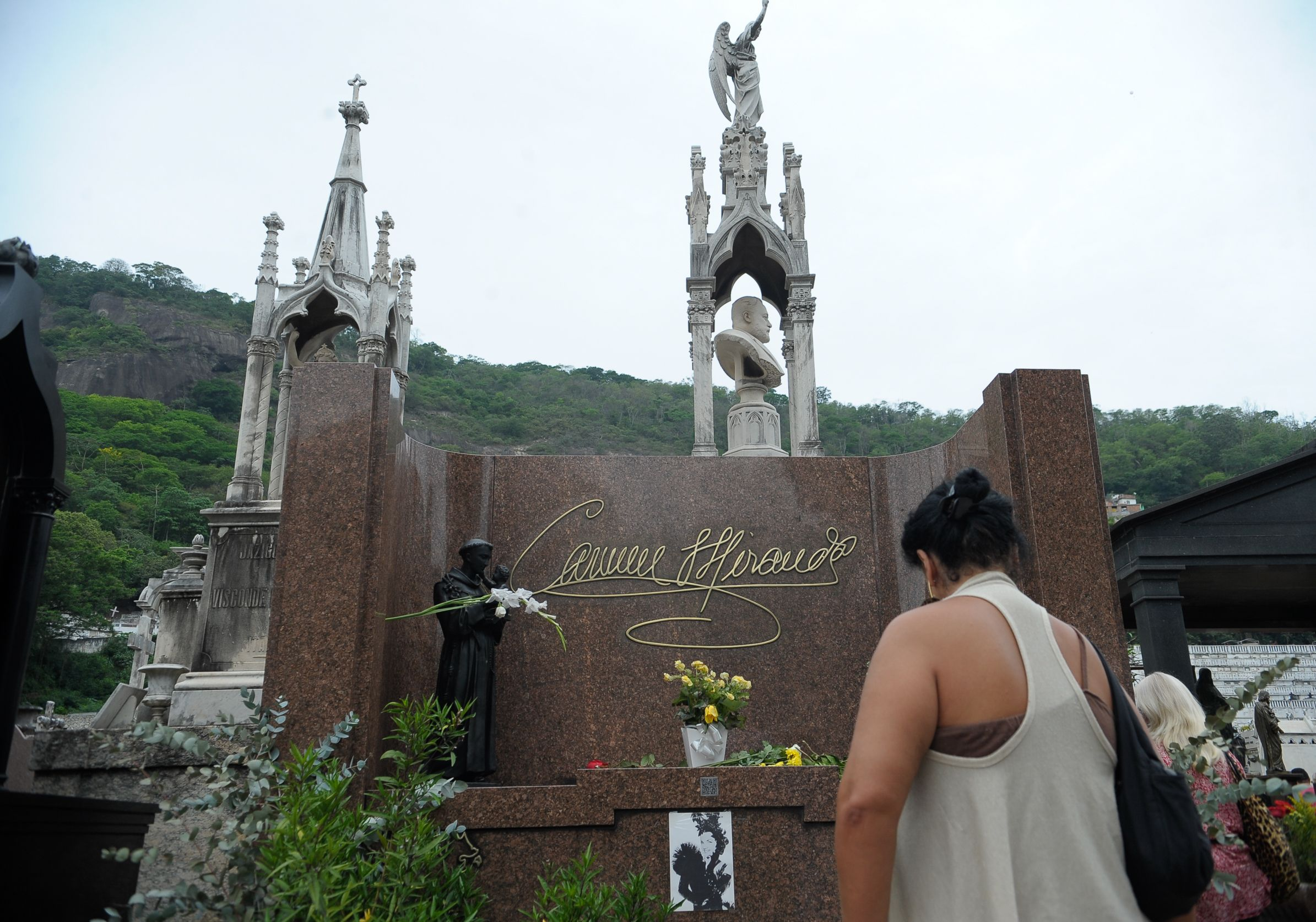
Grave of Carmen Miranda

- Ary Barroso – Brazilian composer
- Álvares de Azevedo – Brazilian poet, playwright and essayist
- Alberto Santos-Dumont – Brazilian aviator
- Antônio Carlos Jobim – Brazilian musician (composer of "The Girl From Ipanema")
- Artur Bernardes – 12th President of Brazil
- Artur da Costa e Silva – 27th President of Brazil
- Aurora Miranda – Brazilian singer, dancer, sister of Carmen Miranda
- Bento Ribeiro – Brazilian military officer and politician
- Bussunda – Brazilian comedian and TV personality
- Café Filho – 18th President of Brazil
- Candido Portinari – Brazilian painter
- Cândido Rondon – Brazilian explorer
- Carmélia Alves – Brazilian singer
- Carmen Miranda – Portuguese Brazilian singer and actress
- Cazuza – Brazilian composer and singer
- Cecília Meireles – Brazilian writer and educator
- Chacrinha – Brazilian TV entertainer
- Clara Nunes – Brazilian singer
- Damião Experiença – Brazilian outsider musician
- Darcy Ribeiro - Brazilian anthropologist, politician
- Dorival Caymmi – Brazilian musician, actor and painter
- Emílio Garrastazu Médici – 28th Brazilian President
- Ernesto Geisel – 29th President of Brazil
- Eurico Gaspar Dutra – 16th President of Brazil
- Marshal Floriano Peixoto – 2nd President of Brazil
- Heitor Villa-Lobos – Brazilian composer
- Izidor "Dori" Kürschner, also often Kru(e)schner (1895–1941) – Hungarian association football coach-
- João Alfredo Correia de Oliveira – Prime Minister of the Brazilian Empire
- João Havelange – 7th President of FIFA
- Jorge José Emiliano dos Santos – Brazilian football referee
- José Linhares – 15th President of Brazil
- Júlio Ximenes Sênior – Brazilian scientist, author and Brazilian Army General
- Lauro Corona, Brazilian actor
- Luís Cruls – Belgian-born Brazilian astronomer and geodesist
- Marcelo Caetano – Prime-Minister of Portugal
- Marília Pêra – Brazilian actress
- Nelson Gonçalves – Brazilian singer
- Nelson Rodrigues – Brazilian playwright, journalist and novelist
- Nilo Peçanha – 7th President of Brazil
- Oscar Cox – Founder of Fluminense Football Club
- Oscar Niemeyer – Brazilian architect who designed civic buildings for Brasilia.
- Osvaldo Aranha – Brazilian diplomat
- Oswaldo Cruz – Brazilian physician, bacteriologist, epidemiologist and public health officer and the founder of the Oswaldo Cruz Institute
- Otto Glória – association football coach
- Roberto Marinho – Founder of the biggest Brazilian TV channel, Rede Globo
- Vinicius de Moraes – Brazilian poet, composer and diplomat
