= Júlio Ximenes Sênior =

Brazilian scientist and medical doctor

Doctor Brigadier-General Júlio Ximenes Sênior wearing his staff uniform during World War II.

Júlio Ximenes Sênior (March 13, 1901 in Uberaba, Minas Gerais – April 11, 1975 in Rio de Janeiro, Rio de Janeiro) was a Brazilian scientist and medical doctor, in the research field of biochemistry, microbiology, and was also a career Brazilian Army officer.

== Military career ==
He attained the rank of brigadier-general during World War II. He had also served as a captain in São Paulo during the Revolution of 1930, which ultimately brought twice-Brazilian president, Getúlio Vargas, into power for the first time. Dr. Ximenes sustained injuries in these conflicts, and was decorated for bravery under fire.

During his military life, he and his family were relocated all over Brazil, including to very remote military outposts of the Amazon, and Mato Grosso do Sul. He was later permanently transferred to Rio de Janeiro, then capital of Brazil, where his family were amongst the first inhabitants of a burgeoning Copacabana, the legendary Carioca beach.

He served as requisitioner-general of the Brazilian Army, a position requiring tact, as well as honesty, as pharmaceutical companies were insistent that their stock be chosen over the others.

In fact, President Vargas once said of the General, "Ximenes is a rare Brazilian: a completely incorruptible man".

== Béchamp versus Pasteur ==
In 1957, having combed the archives of several countries for almost a decade, he wrote Béchamp versus Pasteur, a Portuguese-language monograph on Antoine Béchamp's battles with arch-rival, Louis Pasteur on the topic of germ theory (specifically, pleomorphic theory). He later published in 1960 a French-language version, Béchamp contre Pasteur, which received numerous citations in France, including towards the end of his life, a Palmes Académiques from the French government in recognition of his distinguished services in the field of scientific research.

The English-language edition was published in 1963, entitled Béchamp against Pasteur (Their Ideas And Their Fights), and notably all 3 editions were written and translated by the author himself (he credited his daughter with help in the English version, though he was fluent in English).

== Death ==
He is buried in famed Rio de Janeiro cemetery, Cemitério São João Batista, which has been referred to as the Brazilian Père Lachaise. His grave is located a few yards away from his renowned contemporary, the Hollywood actress, Carmen Miranda, and where fellow Franco-Brazilian pioneer aviator, Alberto Santos-Dumont, is also buried.
