= Dinorá de Carvalho =

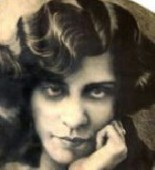
- Dinorá de Carvalho

Background information
- Born: June 1, 1895; Uberaba, Minas Gerais, Brazil
- Died: 28 February 1980 (aged 84) São Paulo, Brazil
- Genres: Classical
- Occupations: Pianist, Composer

Dinorá Gontijo de Carvalho (1 June 1895 – 28 February 1980) was a Brazilian pianist, conductor, music educator and composer.

== Life ==
Carvalho was born in Uberaba, Minas Gerais, Brazil, and began her study of piano at the Conservatório Musical in São Paulo at age six with Maria Lacaz Machado and Carlino Crescenzo. She made her debut as a pianist at age seven playing Mozart and Mendelssohn, and later studied with Isidor Philipp in Paris on a Ministry of Culture scholarship. She continued her studies in Brazil with Lamberto Baldi, Martin Brawnvieser, Ernest Mehelich and Camargo Guarnieri.

After completing her studies, Carvalho worked as a pianist, composer, conductor and music educator. She became the first woman member of the Brazilian Academy of Music and became the first woman Brazilian maestro, founding an all-woman orchestra, the Orquestra Feminina de São Paulo. In 1960, having composed about 400 works, Dinorá was invited by the Ministry of Culture of Brazil to go in a cultural mission around Europe, playing her compositions as well as other Brazilian composers. Her work Missa Profundis received first prize for Best Vocal Work of 1977 from the Associação Paulista de Críticos de Arte.

Dinorá died in São Paulo on February 28, 1980.

== Works ==
Carvalho composed for solo instruments, chorus, choir and orchestra, chamber ensemble, piano and orchestra, symphony orchestra, theater and ballet. Selected works include:

- A ti, flor do céu (Text: Theodomiro Alves Pereira)
- Acalanto (Text: Cleómenes Campos)
- Água que passa (Text: Paulo Lébeis Bonfim)
- Ausência (Text: Suzana de Campos)
- Bamboleia
- Banzo (Text: Menotti del Picchia)
- Berceuse (Text: José de Freitas Valle)
- Canção do embalo (Text: Cecília Benevides de Carvalho Meireles)
- Canção ingênua (Text: Milton Vaz de Camargo)
- Carmo (in Estampas de Vila Rica) (Text: Carlos Drummond de Andrade)
- Coqueiro-coqueirá (Text: Volkslieder)
- Ê-bango-bango-ê (Text: Volkslieder)
- Epigrama número 9 (Text: Cecília Benevides de Carvalho Meireles)
- Espelho (Text: Jandyra Sounis Carvalho de Oliveira)
- Ideti (Text: Dioscoredes dos Santos)
- Instantâneo do adeus (Text: Elza Heloísa)
- Menino mandú (Text: Volkslieder)
- Mosaico (Text: Geraldo Vidigal)
- Noite de São Paulo (Text: Guilherme de Almeida)
- Num imbaiá (Text: Volkslieder)
- O ar (Text: Paulo Lébeis Bonfim)
- O fogo (Text: Paulo Lébeis Bonfim)
- O pipoqueiro (pregão)
- Onde estás (Text: Alice Camargo Guarnieri)
- Pau-piá (Text: Volkslieder)
- Perdão (Text: Milton Marques)
- Pobre cego (Text: Volkslieder)
- Presença (Text: Jandyra Sounis Carvalho de Oliveira)
- Quem sofre (Text: Menotti del Picchia)
- Quibungo te-rê-rê (Text: Volkslieder)
- Quinguê-lê (Text: Volkslieder)
- Samaritana (Text: Paulo Lébeis Bonfim)
- São Francisco de Assis (in Estampas de Vila Rica) (Text: Carlos Drummond de Andrade)
- Sinal de terra (Text: Cassiano Ricardo)
- Sum-sum (Text: Volkslieder)
- Teu rosto azul (Text: Fúlvia Lopes de Carvalho)
- Uai ni-nim (Text: Volkslieder)
- Último retrato (Text: Maria A. Franquini Neto)
- Velas ao mar (Text: Alberto de Oliveira)
