= Federal University of Triângulo Mineiro =

Public university in Brazil

Coordinates: 19.7548°S 47.9313°W

- Universidade Federal do Triângulo Mineiro
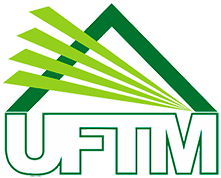
- Other names: UFTM
- Type: Public university
- Established: April 27, 1953
- Budget: R$ 366.351.270,00
- Rector: Marinalva Vieira Barbosa, Ph.D
- Academic staff: 621
- Students: 7.550
- Undergraduates: 6.200
- Postgraduates: 980
- Location: Uberaba and Iturama, Minas Gerais, Brazil
- Colours: green yellowgreen white
- Sporting affiliations: RENEX
- Website: www.uftm.edu.br

The Federal University of Triângulo Mineiro (Portuguese: Universidade Federal do Triângulo Mineiro or UFTM) is a public university located in the city of Uberaba, Minas Gerais, Brazil, formerly FMTM (Faculty of Medicine of the Triângulo Mineiro) and transformed into a university in 2005 by a federal government decree.

The courses currently taught are: Agronomy, Biomedicine, Biological Sciences, Field Education, Physical Education, Nursing, Physics, Physiotherapy, Geography, History, Linguistics, Mathematics, Medicine, Nutrition, Psychology, Chemistry, Social Work, Occupational Therapy, Civil Engineering, Environmental Engineering, Food Engineering, Production Engineering, Electrical Engineering, Mechanical Engineering, Chemical engineering.

== Introduction ==
The Federal University of Triângulo Mineiro is a Federal Institution of Higher Education. It was founded on May 27, 1953, under the name of Triângulo Mineiro Medical School. Following the success and national and international recognition in the training of physicians, the FMTM served as the basis for the creation of Nursing and Biomedicine courses and later in the creation of UFTM. It has its headquarters in Rua Frei Paulino nº 30, Abadia neighborhood, in Uberaba. The UFTM has a total area of 108,889.41m² (own properties), 27,494.44m² of the Hospital of Clinics of UFTM. The university presents an area of influence in the region of Triângulo Mineiro and today it sees its area of influence extended, extending to the interior of São Paulo, Goiás, Mato Grosso and Mato Grosso do Sul. The teaching provided by UFTM has been recognized as quality due to its scientific maturation, the progressive qualification of its faculty, investments in research and extension activities aimed at meeting the needs and aspirations of the local community and the region. There has always been a growing interest in UFTM to carry out the indissociability of teaching, research and extension, and in its 50 years of existence the UFTM has been outstanding in the research area, with its concerns aimed at solving local and regional problems. In this sense, it has dedicated special attention to Chagas disease, Schistosomiasis, Leishmaniasis and other common tropical diseases in the region.

== Brief history of UFTM ==
Traditional in the health study, the Federal University of Triângulo Mineiro, former Faculty of Medicine of Triângulo Mineiro, was founded in 1953, obtaining authorization for the operation of the Medical Course from 1954. Since its foundation, it has developed in the aspects quantitative and qualitative, creating and operating, as of 1989, the Undergraduate Nursing, and from 2000 the Graduate Course in Biomedicine, baccalaureate. In 2006, the Undergraduate Courses in Physiotherapy, Nutrition, Occupational Therapy and Licentiate in Portuguese / Spanish and Portuguese / English Literature were implemented. In 2009, undergraduate courses in Biological Sciences, Physical Education, Physics, Geography, History, Mathematics, Chemistry, Social Work were implemented. In 2010, undergraduate courses in Civil Engineering, Environmental Engineering, Food Engineering, Production Engineering, Electrical Engineering, Mechanical Engineering and Chemical Engineering were implemented.

The Federal University of Triângulo Mineiro offers, at the Lato Sensu Postgraduate level, nineteen Medical Residency Programs in various specialties and two Specialization courses. At the undergraduate level Strito Sensu, he created in 1987 the Postgraduate Master's Degree in Human Pathology and now offers Master's and Doctorate in Pathology (with 05 areas of concentration) and in Tropical Medicine and Infectology (with 02 areas of concentration). Since 1987, it has been offered the Course of Perfection in Tropical Medicine with 10 vacancies annually, where students from all over Latin America are received. Due to the high demand and seeking to materialize its proposal to expand teaching activities in the health area, in 1990 the UFTM obtained authorization to create the Cefores - Special Health Training Center, with the objective of training technicians to work in the currently offering five technical courses.

== Chronological facts ==
1953 - Foundation - authorization to operate the Undergraduate Medical Course

1960 - Federalization

1972 - Official start of lato sensu

1980 - Official Home of the Medical Residence

1982 - Inauguration of Teaching Hospital

1987 - Beginning of the stricto sensu

1989 - Creation of the Undergraduate Nursing Course

1990 - Implementation of CEFORES, Special Health Training Center

1999 - Creation of the Undergraduate Course in Biomedicine

2005 - Transformation at Federal University of the Triângulo Mineiro

2006 - Implantation of five new courses (Graduation in Physiotherapy, Nutrition, Occupational Therapy and Degree in Linguistics - Portuguese / Spanish and Portuguese / English)

2008 - Implementation of the Psychology Undergraduate course

2009 - Implementation of eight new courses (Undergraduate in Physical Education, Social Service and Licentiates in Biological Sciences, Physics, Chemistry, Mathematics, Geography and History)

2010 - Implantation of seven new courses (Undergraduate in Civil Engineering, Environmental Engineering, Food Engineering, Production Engineering, Electrical Engineering, Mechanical Engineering, Chemical Engineering)

2012 - Implementation of the Interdisciplinary Field Education Course

== Courses offered ==
UFTM offers undergraduate, postgraduate and stricto sensu courses (Medical Residency, Multiprofessional Health Residency, Academic Master's, Master's and Doctorate), technical and vocational courses, organizes various events. UFTM libraries are available for book lending for the entire UFTM internal community and the external community (up to 15 users of the external community simultaneously).

GRADUATION - CAMPI UBERABA

The UFTM made available in 2012, 1,354 places in the 25 undergraduate courses:

- Biomedicine
- Biological Sciences - Bachelor's Degree
- Field Education - Bachelor's Degree
- Physical Education - Bachelor
- Nursing
- Environmental engineering
- Civil Engineering
- Food Engineering
- Production engineering
- Electrical engineering
- Mechanical Engineering
- Chemical engineering
- Physics - Bachelor
- Physiotherapy
- Geography - Bachelor
- History - Degree
- Linguistics - Hab. Portuguese English
- Linguistics - Hab. Portuguese Spanish
- Mathematics - Bachelor
- Medicine
- Nutrition
- Psychology
- Chemistry - Bachelor's degree
- Social service
- Occupational therapy

GRADUATION - CAMPUS ITURAMA

- Agronomy
- Biological Sciences - Bachelor's Degree
- Chemistry - Bachelor's degree

== Campus ==
Currently UFTM counts on campuses in the cities of Uberaba and Iturama, both in the Triângulo Mineiro. In Uberaba: Educational Center of UFTM - CE, Educational and Administrative Center of UFTM - CEA, Campus I Manoel Terra, Unit I Univerdecidade, Unit II Univerdecidade, Unit III Univerdecidade, Hospital of Clinics of UFTM - HC (Teaching Hospital), Scientific Center and Cultural Center of the Peirópolis neighborhood - CCCP and educational unit in the Shopping Center Urbano Salomão, besides several laboratories, projects, annex buildings and cinema outside the campuses. In Iturama: Iturama University Campus.

=== Educational Center - CE / UFTM ===
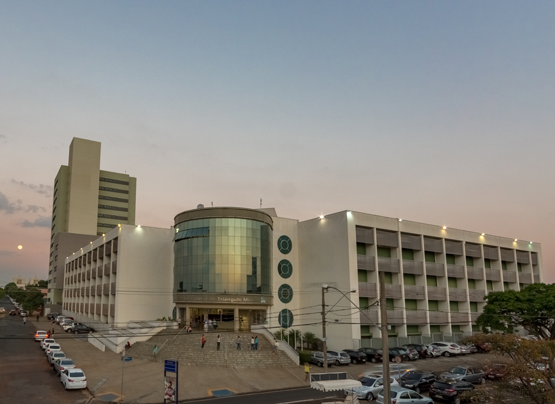
Facade of the Educational Center-CE

The CE / UFTM, located at Av. Getúlio Guaritá, 159, Abadia, Uberaba - MG, has classrooms and laboratories. Two more buildings are being built in annex, in which they will be housed, as well as classrooms and laboratories, university restaurant, cafeteria, amphitheater, departmental and institutional coordinations and academic directories. The Pro-Rector's Office for Community and Student Affairs at UFTM - ProACE / UFTM is on the 2nd floor of CE / UFTM.

=== Educational and Administrative Center - CEA / UTFM ===
The CEA / UFTM, located at Av. Frei Paulino, 30, Abadia, Uberaba - MG, houses the university rectory and the Pro-Rector's Office for Research and Postgraduate Studies - PROPPG / UFTM, Proext / UFTM University Extension, Teaching - Proens / UFTM, Administration - Proad / UFTM and Planning - Proplan / UFTM. The administrative complex houses two amphitheatres, a hall for solemnities and the central university library.

=== Campus I - Manoel Terra ===
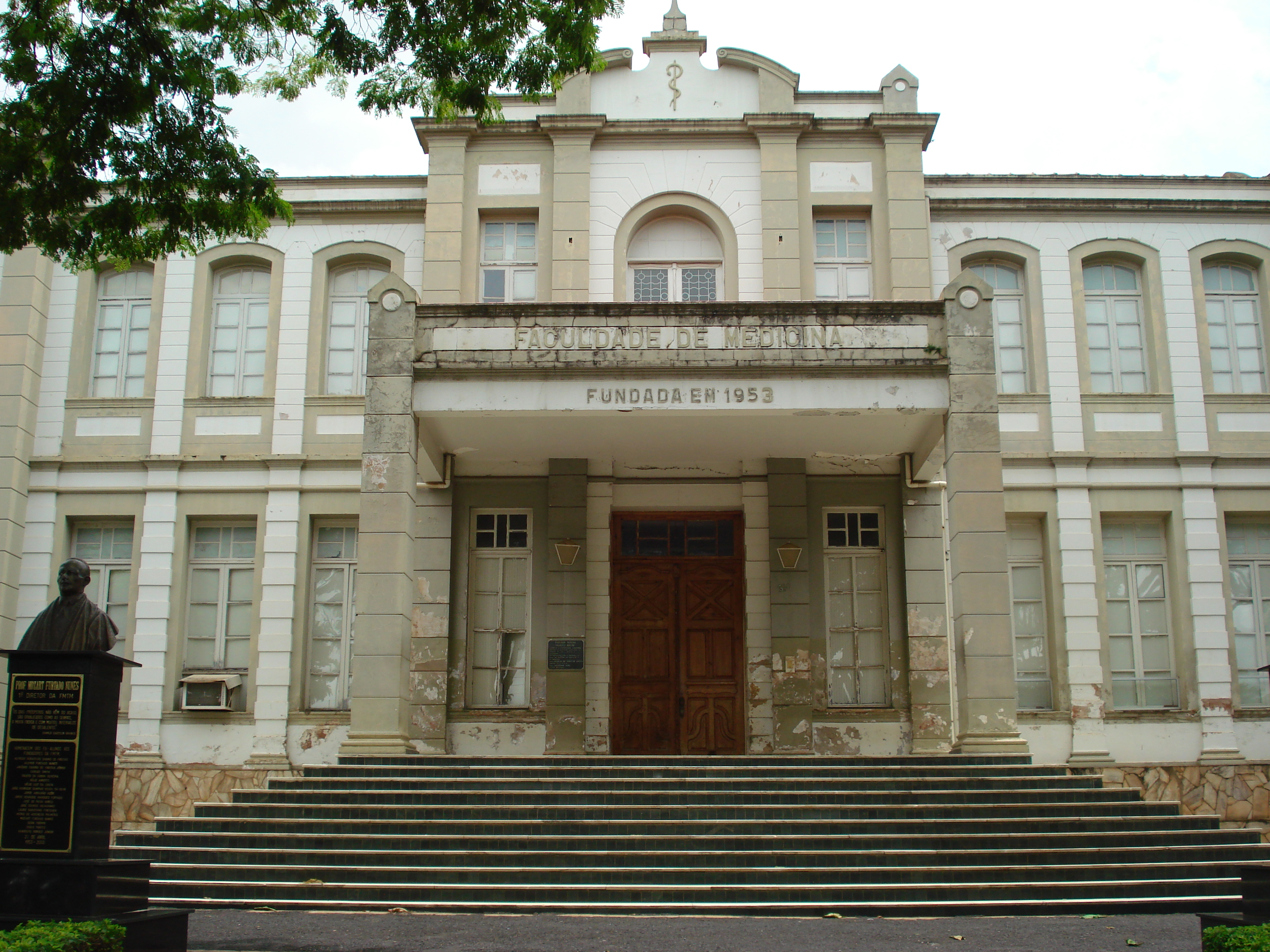
Facade Of Campus Manoel Terra

Campus I, located at Praça Manoel Terra, s / n, Centro, Uberaba - MG, is the first UFTM building. Headquarters of the former FMTM, the building was until 1952 a chain, when in 1953 was transformed into the Medical School of Triângulo Mineiro. The campus has classrooms, laboratories and morgues. In it is housed the secretariat of the Vocational Training Center - Cefores / UFTM, the technical school of the university, which has technical courses in Clinical Analysis, Nursing, Pharmacy, Computer Science, Nutrition, Radiology, Oral Health and Occupational Safety, besides offering also the popular cursinho.

=== Peirópolis Scientific-Cultural Complex - CCCP / UTFM ===
The CCCP / UFTM is a rural academic unit that houses laboratories and museums related to the exploitation of fossils at the excavation site in the Peirópolis neighborhood, the largest in Latin America. Located at Rua Estanilau Collenghi, 194, Peirópolis, Uberaba - MG, the Complex is open for visitation and for sightseeing and school trips. The neighborhood has a complete infrastructure for reception of visitors and researchers and is connected to the urban area by means of a collective transport line to the Eastern Terminal (line I58 - Ponte Alta).

=== Univerdecidade Units ===
The units in the Univerdecidade neighborhood (Avenida Dr. Randolfo Borges Júnior, 1250 and 1400, Uberaba - MG) are home to twelve UFTM undergraduate courses. Forming a university city, the three building complexes have classrooms, laboratories, a library, an amphitheater, a cafeteria, a university restaurant and two internal public transportation lines, which directly connect the UFTM to the Western Terminal (line F15 - Distrito Industrial II and line F17 - UFTM).

== See also ==
- List of federal universities of Brazil
- Triângulo Mineiro region in Brazil
