= National Department of Mineral Production =

The National Department of Mineral Production (Departamento Nacional de Produção Mineral - DNPM) was a Brazilian federal autarchy, linked to the Ministry of Mines and Energy, with headquarters and jurisdiction in the Brazilian capital, Brasília. It had authority across the entire National Territory, represented by superintendencies and delegations.

The DNPM was dissolved through Provisional Measure No. 791, issued on July 25, 2017, establishing the National Mining Agency (Agência Nacional de Mineração - ANM). Subsequently, the Decree No. 9,587, issued on November 27, 2018, approved ANM's organizational structure.

== Fossils ==
The Decree-Law No. 4,146 of 1942 gave the DNPM the power to regulate and supervise the fossils in Brazil.

== See also ==
- Geoparks in Brazil
- Paleorrota Geopark
