= List of Romantic poets =

This article lists the most notable Romantic poets.

== England ==
The six best-known English male authors are, in order of birth and with an example of their work:

- William Blake – The Marriage of Heaven and Hell
- William Wordsworth – The Prelude
- Samuel Taylor Coleridge – The Rime of the Ancient Mariner
- George Gordon, Lord Byron – Don Juan, "Childe Harold's Pilgrimage"
- Percy Bysshe Shelley – Prometheus Unbound, "Adonaïs", "Ode to the West Wind", "Ozymandias"
- John Keats – Great Odes, "Hyperion", "Endymion"

Notable female poets include:

- Felicia Dorothea Hemans
- Anna Laetitia Barbauld
- Charlotte Smith
- Mary Robinson
- Hannah More
- Joanna Baillie

== Major Romantic poets across the world ==
- Albania: Jeronim de Rada, Naim Frashëri
- Brazil: Álvares de Azevedo, Castro Alves, Casimiro de Abreu, Gonçalves Dias, Fagundes Varela, Junqueira Freire, Gonçalves de Magalhães
- Bulgaria: Hristo Botev
- Croatia: Petar Preradović
- Czech Republic: Karel Hynek Macha
- Denmark: N. F. S. Grundtvig, Adam Oehlenschläger, Hans Christian Andersen
- France: Marceline Desbordes-Valmore, Alphonse de Lamartine, Alfred de Vigny, Victor Hugo, Aloysius Bertrand, Gérard de Nerval, Théophile Gautier, Alfred de Musset, Charles Baudelaire
- Georgia: Alexander Chavchavadze, Nikoloz Baratashvili, Grigol Orbeliani
- Germany: Heinrich Heine, Johann Wolfgang von Goethe, Friedrich Schiller, Novalis, Friedrich Hölderlin, E. T. A. Hoffmann, Clemens Brentano, Joseph Freiherr von Eichendorff, Achim von Arnim
- Hungary: Sándor Petőfi
- India: Michael Madhusudan Dutt, Rabindranath Tagore, Satyendranath Dutta, Kazi Nazrul Islam, Jibanananda Das, Jaishankar Prasad, Suryakant Tripathi, Sumitranandan Pant, Mahadevi Verma
- Italy: Giacomo Leopardi, Ugo Foscolo, Alessandro Manzoni, Vittorio Alfieri
- Montenegro: Petar II Petrović Njegoš
- Poland: Three Bards (Adam Mickiewicz, Juliusz Słowacki, Zygmunt Krasiński), Cyprian Kamil Norwid
- Portugal: Alexandre Herculano, Almeida Garrett, António Feliciano de Castilho
- Romania: Ion Heliade Radulescu, Dimitrie Bolintineanu, Vasile Alecsandri, Mihai Eminescu
- Russia: Golden Age of Russian Poetry – Aleksandr Pushkin, Mikhail Lermontov, Fyodor Tyutchev, Evgeny Baratynsky, Vasily Zhukovsky, Konstantin Batyushkov
- Serbia: Branko Radičević, Đura Jakšić, Laza Kostić, Jovan Jovanović Zmaj
- Slovakia: Janko Kráľ
- Slovenia: France Prešeren
- Spain: Gustavo Adolfo Becquer, José de Espronceda, Rosalía de Castro, José Zorrilla, Jacint Verdaguer
- Ukraine: Taras Shevchenko
- United States: Henry Wadsworth Longfellow, Ralph Waldo Emerson, Edgar Allan Poe

== Minor Romantic poets ==
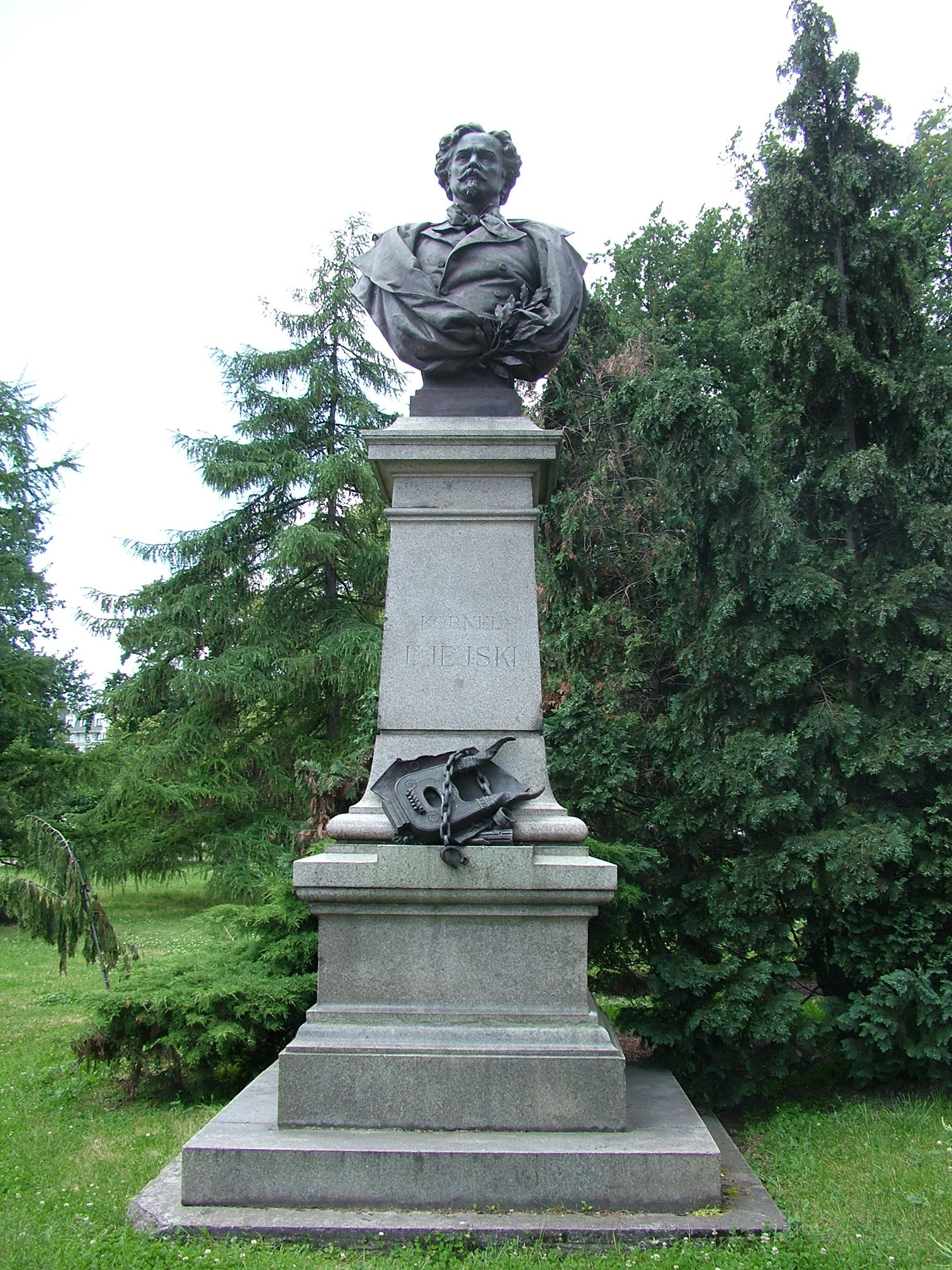
Kornel Ujejski – monument in Szczecin (Poland) moved from Lviv in 1946

- Brazil: Laurindo Rabelo, Sousândrade, José Bonifácio the Young, Aureliano Lessa, João Cardoso de Meneses e Sousa, Manuel de Araújo Porto-alegre
- France: Gérard de Nerval, Leconte de Lisle, Aloysius Bertrand, Philothée O'Neddy (born: Théophile Dondey de Santeny)
- Georgia: Grigol Orbeliani, Vakhtang Orbeliani
- Germany: Gottfried August Bürger, Ludwig Tieck
- Hungary: Mihály Vörösmarty
- Iceland: Jónas Hallgrímsson
- Italy: Silvio Pellico
- Norway: Henrik Arnold Wergeland, Johan Sebastian Cammermeyer Welhaven
- Pakistan: Jaun Elia, Parveen Shakir, Mohsin Naqvi
- Poland: Kornel Ujejski, Antoni Malczewski, Tomasz Zan, Wincenty Pol, Seweryn Goszczyński, Władysław Syrokomla, Kazimierz Brodziński, Józef Ignacy Kraszewski, Aleksander Fredro
- Portugal: Almeida Garrett, Alexandre Herculano
- Russia: Anton Delvig, Wilhelm Küchelbecker, Nikolay Gnedich
- Serbia: Sima Milutinović Sarajlija
- Slovakia: Andrej Sládkovič
- Spain: Mariano José de Larra, Ramón de Campoamor
- Sweden: Erik Johan Stagnelius
- United States: William Cullen Bryant, Joseph Rodman Drake, John Greenleaf Whittier, Oliver Wendell Holmes Sr., George Sterling, John Neal
