= Ultra-Romanticism =

19th-century Portuguese and Brazilian literary movement

Ultra-Romanticism (Portuguese: Ultrarromantismo) was a Portuguese and Brazilian literary movement that took place during the second half of the 19th century. Aesthetically similar to (but not exactly the same as) the German- and British-originated Dark Romanticism, it was typified by a tendency to exaggerate the norms and ideals of Romanticism, namely the value of subjectivity, individualism, amorous idealism, nature and the medieval world. The Ultra-Romantics generated literary works of highly contendable quality, some of them being considered as "romance of knife and earthenware bowl", given the succession of bloody crimes that they invariably described, which realists fiercely denounced.

In Portugal, the first Ultra-Romantic piece ever written was the poem O noivado do sepulcro ("The tombstone engagement") by António Augusto Soares de Passos, while in Brazil the first major Ultra-Romantic works were the books Lira dos Vinte Anos (Twenty-year-old Lyre) and Noite na Taverna (A Night at the Tavern) by Álvares de Azevedo.

In Brazil, it is called "the second phase of the Brazilian Romanticism", being preceded by the "Indianism" and succeeded by the "Condorism".

== General characteristics ==
- Creative liberty (the content is more important than the form; grammatical rules often ignored)
- Free versification
- Doubt, dualism
- Constant repugnance, morbidness, suffering, pessimism, Satanism, masochism, cynicism, self-destruction
- Denial of reality in favour of the world of dreams, fancy and imagination (escapism, evasion)
- Adolescent disillusion
- Idealization of love and women
- Subjectivity, egocentricity
- Saudosismo (an untranslatable word meaning homesickness or longing, approximately German Sehnsucht) for childhood and the past
- A preference for the nocturnal
- Conscience of solitude
- Death: total and definitive escape from life, an end to suffering; sarcasm, irony

== Main adepts ==
=== In Portugal ===
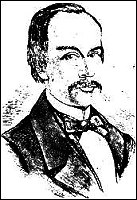
António Augusto Soares de Passos, the first Ultra-Romantic Portuguese poet

- António Augusto Soares de Passos (1826–1860; considered to be the major Ultra-Romantic poet)
- António Feliciano de Castilho (1800–1875)
- Camilo Castelo Branco (1825–1890)
- João de Lemos (1819–1890)
- João de Deus (1830–1896)
- Luís Augusto Palmeirim (1821–1893)
- Alexandre Braga, father (1829–1895)
- Tomás Ribeiro (1831–1901)

=== In Brazil ===
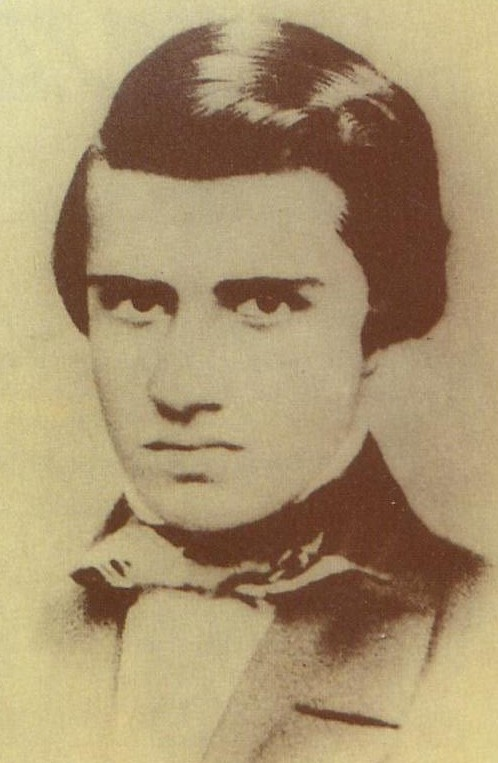
Álvares de Azevedo is one of the most well-known Ultra-Romantic Brazilian poets, winning the epithet of "the Brazilian Lord Byron"

- Álvares de Azevedo (1831–1852)
- Junqueira Freire (1832–1855)
- Fagundes Varela (1841–1875)
- Casimiro de Abreu (1839–1860)
- Aureliano Lessa (1828–1861)
- José Bonifácio the Younger (1827–1886; in only a few poems, however)
- Pedro de Calasans (1837–1874)
- Laurindo Rabelo (1826–1864)
- João Cardoso de Meneses e Sousa (1827–1915)

== In Brazil ==
The "Ultra-Romanticism" changed the ways of the Romanticism in Brazil. Values such as nationalism and valorization of the Indian as the Brazilian national hero, a constant theme of the previous Brazilian Romantic generation, are now almost, if not completely, absent. This new generation, heavily influenced by German Romanticism and works by Lord Byron and Alfred de Musset, among others, now focalizes in obscure and macabre themes, such as pessimism, the supernatural, Satanism, longing for death, past and childhood, and the mal du siècle. Love and women were heavily idealized, platonic and almost always unrequited, and the presence of a strong egocentrism and exacerbated sentimentalism in the poetry is clearly noticed.

== See also ==
- Romanticism
- German Romanticism
- Sturm und Drang
- Mal du siècle
- Noite na Taverna
- Dark Romanticism
- Gothic fiction
