= Recife School =

Brazilian philosophical school

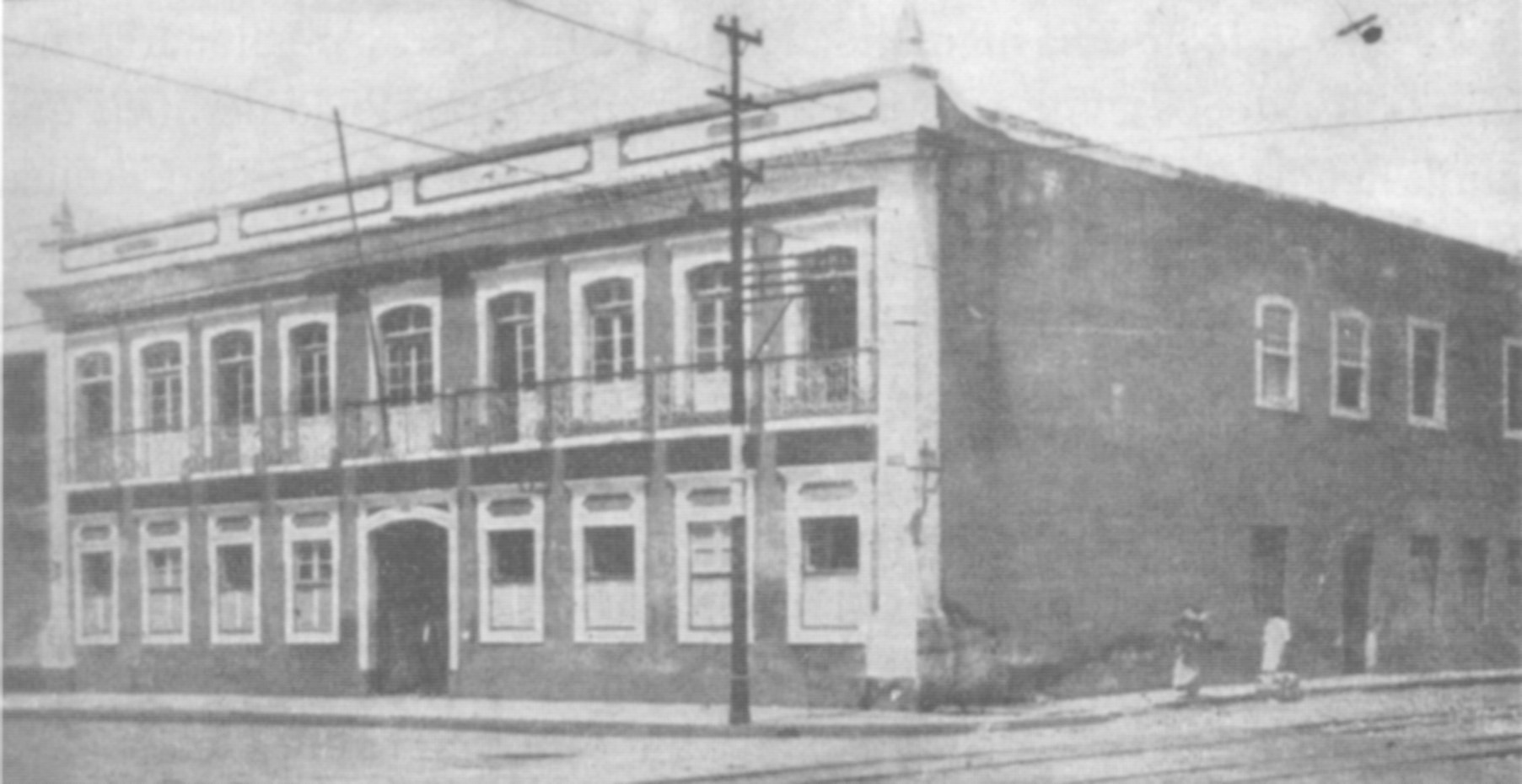
The historical building of the Faculty of Law of Recife.

The so-called Recife School (Portuguese: Escola do Recife) was a literary and philosophical movement that emerged in the 1860s and flourished throughout the late nineteenth century in Brazil.

Among its representatives were the philosophers Tobias Barreto and Raimundo de Farias Brito, the historian and statesman Joaquim Nabuco, the literary critic Silvio Romero, and the jurist Clóvis Bevilacqua, all of whom had studied at the Faculty of Law of Recife.

Drawing from influences such as neo-Kantianism, positivism, the German historical school, and Darwin's theory of evolution, its members were active within areas such as ethics, metaphysics, aesthetics, philosophy of Law, and the sociology of culture.

Over time, several of the School's exponents, molded by liberal ideals, grew into key figures in both the abolition of slavery and in the process that led to the proclamation of the Brazilian Republic.
