= Fagundes Varela =

Brazilian poet

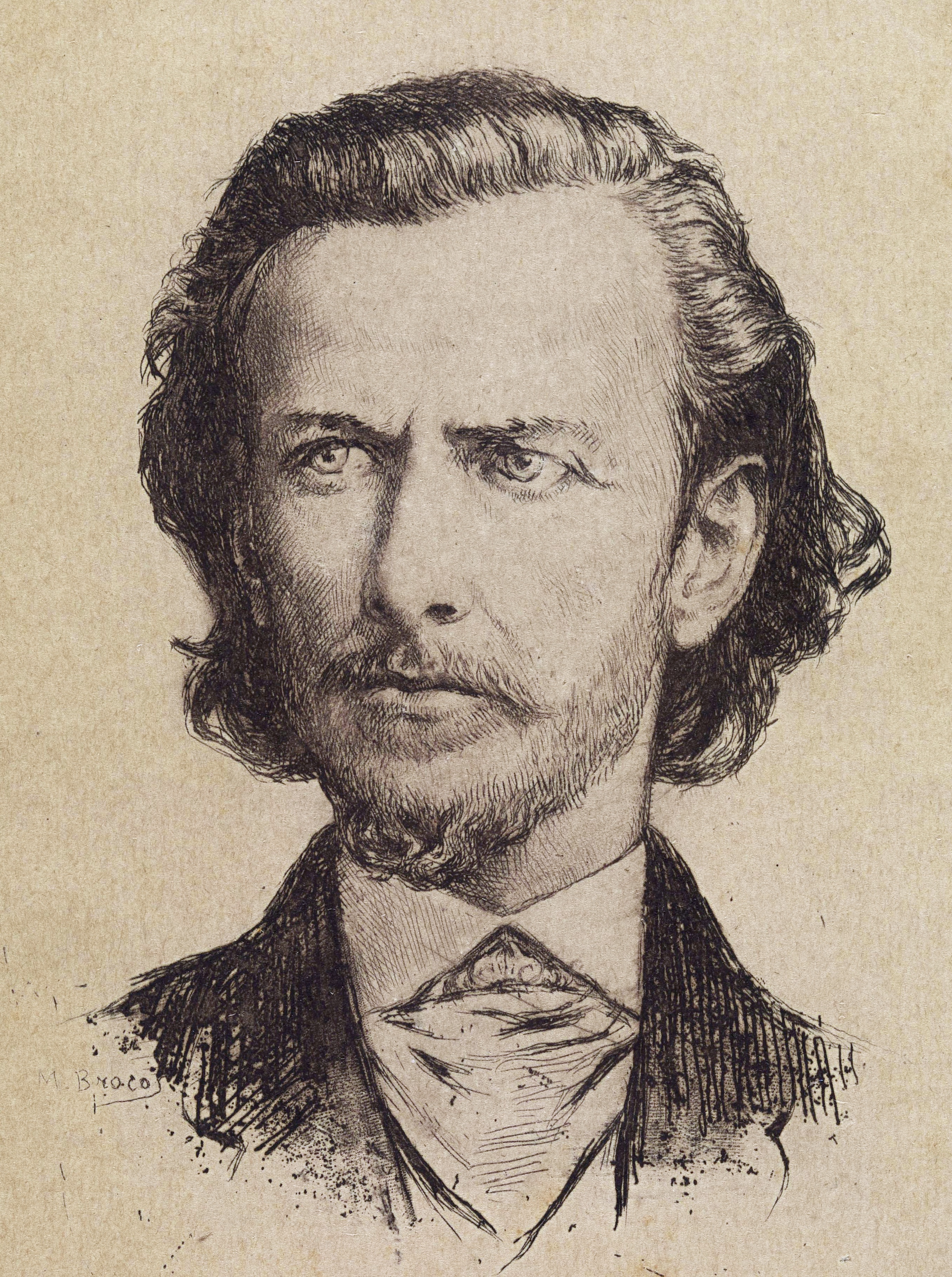
- Fagundes Varela.
- Born: Luís Nicolau Fagundes Varela; 17 August 1841; Rio Claro, Rio de Janeiro, Brazil
- Died: 18 February 1875 (aged 33); Niterói, Rio de Janeiro, Brazil
- Occupation: Poet
- Spouse(s): Alice Guilhermina Luande, Maria Belisária de Brito Lambert
- Children: Emiliano Varela
- Writing career
- Notable works: Noturnas, Vozes da América
- Movement: Romanticism

Luís Nicolau Fagundes Varela (August 17, 1841 – February 18, 1875) was a Brazilian Romantic poet, adept of the "Ultra-Romanticism" movement. He is patron of the 11th chair of the Brazilian Academy of Letters.

== Biography ==
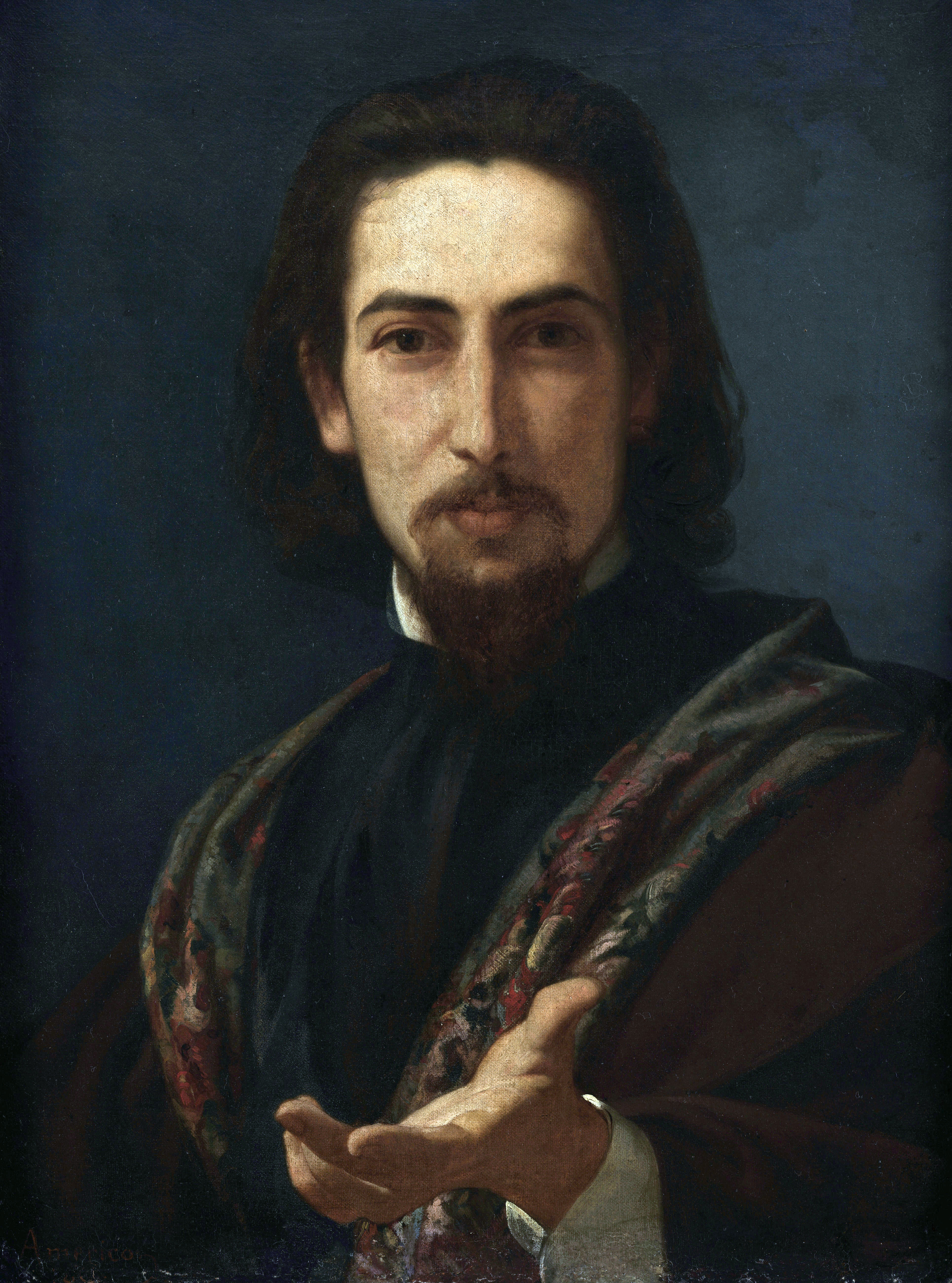
A portrait of Fagundes Varela, by Pedro Américo

Luís Nicolau Fagundes Varela was born in Rio Claro in 1841, to Emiliano Fagundes Varela and Emília de Andrade. He spent most of his childhood at the farm where he was born, later moving to innumerous places, among them the city of Catalão, Goiás, where he met Bernardo Guimarães. Returning to Rio de Janeiro, he lived in Angra dos Reis and Petrópolis, where he concluded his primary and secondary studies. In 1859, he went to São Paulo and, in 1862, he enrolled at the Largo de São Francisco Law School, but abandoned it to dedicate himself to the literature and to the bohemianism. He published his first poetry book, Noturnas, one year before.

He married a circus artist from Sorocaba, Alice Guilhermina Luande. This provoked a scandal in his family and made his financial condition worse. With her he had a son, Emiliano, who died at 3 months old; extremely depressed, Fagundes wrote in the memory of his dead son his most well-known poem, "Cântico do Calvário" (that can be found on the book Cantos e Fantasias). His wife died in 1865 or 1866, while Varela was travelling to Recife. Returning to São Paulo, he enrolled once more in the Largo de São Francisco Law School in 1867, but later abandoned it once more. He then returned to his house in Rio Claro, living there until 1870. He married again, with his cousin Maria Belisária de Brito Lambert, having two daughters and one son.

Having moved to Niterói with his father in 1870, he lived there until his death on 8 February 1875.

Some of Varela's poems have an unusual theme for the Ultra-Romanticism: abolitionism. Because of that, he is considered to be one of the forerunners of the "Condorism", alongside Junqueira Freire, another Ultra-Romantic poet who spoke of abolitionism in some of his poems.

== Works ==
- Noturnas (1861)
- Vozes da América (1864)
- Cantos e Fantasias (1865)
- Cantos Meridionais (1869)
- Cantos do Ermo e da Cidade (1869)
- Anchieta, ou O Evangelho na Selva (1875 — posthumous)
- Cantos Religiosos (1878 — poems compiled by Varela's friend Otaviano Hudson, with the objective of consolating Varela's wife and children)
- O Diário de Lázaro e Outras Poesias (1880 — posthumous)

Preceded by New creation	Brazilian Academy of Letters - Patron of the 11th chair	Succeeded by Lúcio de Mendonça (founder)
