= Pedro de Calasans =

Brazilian writer

- Born: Pedro Luziense de Bittencourt Calasans; January 29, 1837; Santa Luzia do Itanhy, Sergipe, Brazil
- Died: February 24, 1874 (aged 37); Near Madeira, Portugal
- Occupations: Poet, journalist, playwright, literary critic
- Relatives: João José de Bittencourt Calasans
- Writing career
- Notable works: Adeus!, Wiesbade, Uma Cena de Nossos Dias
- Movement: Romanticism

Pedro Luziense de Bittencourt Calasans (January 29, 1837 – February 24, 1874) was a Brazilian poet, playwright and journalist, adept of the "Ultra-Romanticism" movement.

== Life ==
Calasans was born in the city of Santa Luzia do Itanhy, in the Brazilian State of Sergipe, to Lieutenant Colonel João José de Bittencourt Calasans (who would be the governor of Sergipe later) and Luísa Carolina Amélia de Calasans. He initiated his studies at the Liceu São Cristóvão, finishing them in Recife, Pernambuco. At 16 years of age, he published his first poetry book, Adeus!.

In 1855, he entered the Faculdade de Direito do Recife, published another poetry book (Páginas Soltas) and started to collaborate with some newspapers. Graduating in 1859, he returned to Sergipe, to the city of Estância, where he married a wealthy lady; however, they divorced some years later.

Moving to Rio de Janeiro in 1861, he became a deputy from 1861 to 1864, dedicating himself solely to journalism and advocacy. In 1864, he traveled to Europe, where he wrote three more books: Ofenísia (while in Brussels), Uma Cena de Nossos Dias, and Wiesbade (both while in Leipzig).

Returning to Brazil in 1867, he became a judge in the city of Caçapava, publishing four more books: A Campa e a Rosa (in which he translated many poems by Victor Hugo), A Morte de Uma Virgem, Qual Delas? and A Rosa e o Sol. He became a provincial deputy in Rio Grande do Sul, later transferring himself to Jeremoabo (Bahia) due to health problems.

His health problems eventually evolved into tuberculosis, and, in unsuccessful attempts to mitigate the disease, Calasans traveled to Ilhéus (Bahia), Serro and Diamantina (both in Minas Gerais). In a final attempt, Calasans embarked to Madeira, but died on ship before arriving at his destination.

== Works ==
=== Poetry ===
- Adeus! (1853)
- Páginas Soltas (1855)
- Últimas Páginas (1858)
- Ofenísia (1864)
- Wiesbade (1864)
- A Morte de Uma Virgem (1867)
- A Rosa e o Sol (1867)
- Qual Delas? (1867)
- A Campa e a Rosa (1867)
- Brazilina (1870)
- Camerino: Episódio da Guerra do Paraguai (1875 — posthumous)
- As Flores de Laranjeira (1881 — posthumous)
- Waterloo (1900 — posthumous)
- A Cascata de Paulafonso (1906 — posthumous)

=== Critics ===
- Traços Ligeiros Sobre o Casamento Civil (1859)
- A Demagogia Entre Nós (1861)

=== Theatre ===
- Uma Cena de Nossos Dias (1864)
