= Raimundo de Farias Brito =

Brazilian philosopher (1862 - 1917)

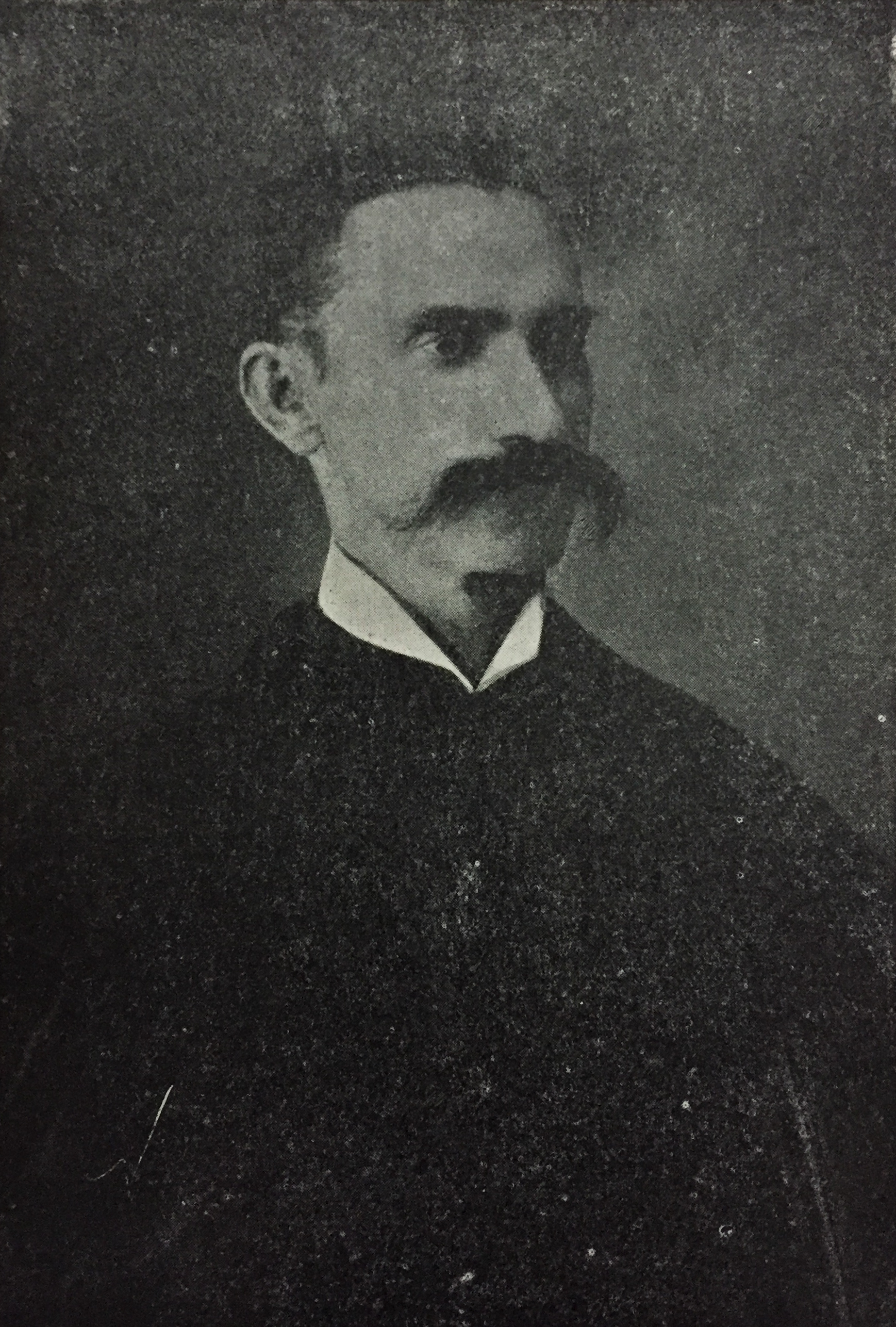
- Born: July 24, 1862; São Benedito, Ceará, Brazil
- Died: January 16, 1917 (aged 54)
- Occupations: professor, lawyer, prosecutor, teacher, writer

Academic background
- Education: Federal University of Pernambuco Recife School of Law
- Influences: Bergson, Spinoza, Kant, Lange, Fischer, Gratry, Schopenhauer, Malebranche, Barreto, Boutroux, Draper

Academic work
- School or tradition: Spiritualism (philosophy)
- Main interests: poetry, law, psychology, religion, theology, epistemology
- Notable works: O Mundo Interior (1914)
- Influenced: Figueiredo, Salgado, dos Santos, Aranha, Reale

Raimundo de Farias Brito (July 24, 1862 – January 16, 1917) was a Brazilian philosopher and writer. His work, which integrates elements of neo-Kantianism and spiritualism, encompasses metaphysics, ethics, political philosophy, and jurisprudence.

== Biography ==
Born in São Benedito, Farias Brito was raised in Sobral and later in Fortaleza, where he studied at the Liceu do Ceará (pt). He then moved to Pernambuco to enroll at the Faculty of Law of Recife, where he attended lectures by the philosopher Tobias Barreto.

Once graduated, he began working as a public prosecutor, later transferring to Belém to teach at the city's law faculty (pt). An established author, he was appointed in 1909 to the chair of Logic at the traditional Colégio Pedro II, where he taught until his death.

== Works ==
- Cantos Modernos (1889)
- História Sobre Fenícios e Hebreus (1891)
- Divagações em torno de uma grande mentalidade (1892)
- Homens do Ceará (1896–1897)
- Sobre a filosofia de Malebranche (1898)
- Manifesto do corpo (1900)
- O positivismo do Gomes de Castro (1902)
