= José Bonifácio the Younger =

Brazilian poet (1827–1886)

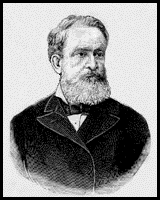
- Born: José Bonifácio de Andrada e Silva; November 8, 1827; Bordeaux, France
- Died: October 26, 1886 (aged 58); São Paulo, Brazil
- Education: University of São Paulo
- Occupations: Poet, politician, teacher
- Spouse(s): Adelaide Eugênia da Costa Aguiar de Andrada, Rafaela de Souza Aguiar Gurgel
- Children: José Bonifácio, Martim Francisco, Narcisa, Maria Flora, Gabriela
- Relatives: José Bonifácio de Andrada e Silva, Martim Francisco Ribeiro de Andrada
- Writing career
- Subjects: Mal du siècle, social engagement
- Notable work: Rosas e Goivos
- Movement: Romanticism

José Bonifácio de Andrada e Silva (November 8, 1827 – October 26, 1886) was a French-born Brazilian poet, teacher and politician. He is known as "the Younger" (Portuguese: O Moço) to distinguish him from his grand-uncle, José Bonifácio de Andrada e Silva, "the Elder" or "the Patriarch", a famous statesman who was one of the most important mentors of Brazilian independence.

He is the patron of the 22nd chair of the Brazilian Academy of Letters, and of the 7th chair of the Paulista Academy of Letters.

== Life ==
José Bonifácio de Andrada e Silva was born in 1827 at the French city of Bordeaux (because of the Andradas' exile), to Martim Francisco Ribeiro de Andrada and Gabriela Frederica Ribeiro de Andrada. After moving to Brazil, more precisely to Rio de Janeiro, he ingressed in his secondary course at what is now the Academia Militar das Agulhas Negras, but had to abandon his studies due to health problems. He graduated in Law in 1853, at the Faculdade de Direito da Universidade de São Paulo, where he befriended Álvares de Azevedo, Aureliano Lessa and Bernardo Guimarães. He became a Law teacher at the Faculdade de Direito do Recife during 1854–1858, where he taught and heavily influenced Castro Alves, Salvador de Mendonça, Joaquim Nabuco, Afonso Pena and Rui Barbosa.

He became a provincial deputy in 1860, minister of the Brazilian Navy in 1862 and senator of the Empire of Brazil in 1864. Getting involved in abolitionist ideals, because of that he rejected the presidency of the Council of Ministers, offered to him by Emperor Pedro II of Brazil.

He was married to Adelaide Eugênia da Costa Aguiar de Andrada. When she died, he then married Rafaela de Souza Aguiar Gurgel do Amaral, having with her five children: José Bonifácio, Martim Francisco, Narcisa, Maria Flora and Gabriela.

He died in 1886.

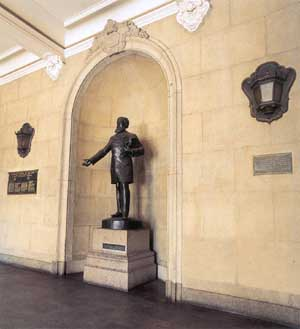
A statue of José Bonifácio the Younger at the Faculdade de Direito da Universidade de São Paulo

== Works ==
José Bonifácio's only work was the poetry book Rosas e Goivos (in English: Roses and Cresses), published in 1848. Its poems oscillate between "Ultra-Romanticism" and "Condorism".

Preceded by New creation	Brazilian Academy of Letters - Patron of the 22nd chair	Succeeded by Medeiros e Albuquerque (founder)
