= António Augusto Soares de Passos =

Portuguese writer

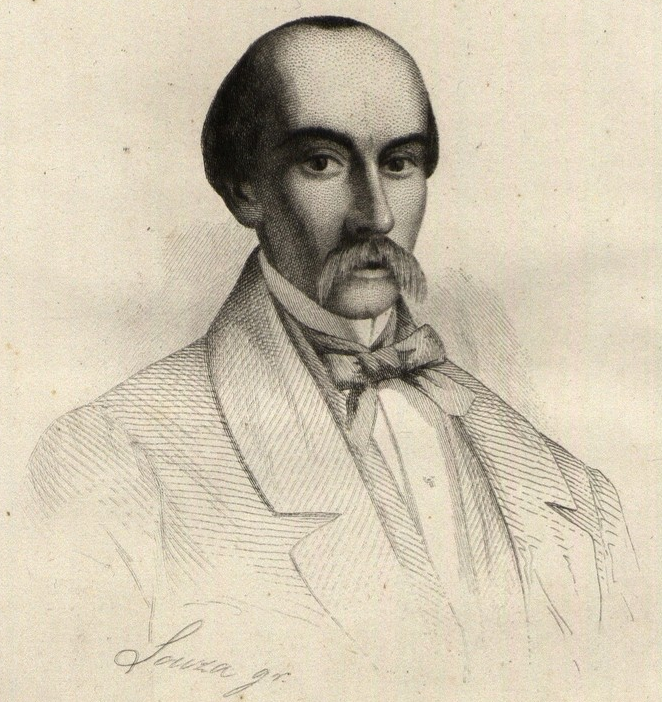
- Born: 27 November 1826; Porto, Portugal
- Died: 8 February 1860 (aged 33); Porto, Portugal
- Education: University of Coimbra
- Occupation: Poet
- Writing career
- Subjects: Mal du siècle, divine judgment
- Notable work: Poesias
- Movement: Romanticism

António Augusto Soares de Passos (27 November 1826 – 8 February 1860), also referred to simply as Soares de Passos, was a Portuguese poet, creator of the "Ultra-Romanticism" in Portugal. Son of merchants and a follower of the Liberal ideas, having learned French and English during his youth, he entered at the University of Coimbra to graduate in Law. There, he met Alexandre Braga, Silva Ferraz and Aires de Gouveia, founding with them, in 1851, the magazine O Novo Trovador (The New Trobadour).

Having already graduated, in 1854, he returned to Porto, collaborating in the poetry journals O Bardo (The Bard) and A Grinalda (The Garland). The only book Passos published during his lifetime was his poetry book Poesias (Poetry), in 1856. The poems mostly speak of death and the wrath of God, all of them with heavy mal du siècle traces.

Having a very tumultuous life, and constantly assailed by disease, he died in 1860, a victim of tuberculosis.
