= Junqueira Freire =

Brazilian poet and essayist

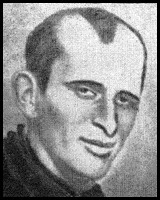
- Born: Luís José Junqueira Freire; 31 December 1832; Salvador, Bahia, Brazil
- Died: 24 June 1855 (aged 23); Salvador, Bahia, Brazil
- Occupation: Poet
- Writing career
- Subject: Mal du siècle
- Notable work: Inspirações do Claustro
- Movement: Romanticism

Luís José Junqueira Freire (December 31, 1832 – June 24, 1855) was a Brazilian poet and Benedictine monk, adept of the "Ultra-Romanticism" movement and author of Inspirações do Claustro. He is the patron of the 25th chair of the Brazilian Academy of Letters.

== Biography ==
Luís José Junqueira Freire was born December 31, 1832, in Salvador, Bahia, to José Vicente de Sá Freire and Felicidade Augusta Junqueira. After completing his primary studies and Latin, he was matriculated at the Liceu Provincial of Salvador in 1849. Two years later, he joined the Order of Saint Benedict by family reasons. Although unsatisfied living at the monastery, there he could write and read poetry, and served as a teacher.

He demanded his secularity in 1853, and, one year later, having obtained it, he refugiated at home, where he wrote his short Autobiography. Shortly before dying on June 24, 1855, due to heart problems he had since his childhood, Freire published the poetry anthology he wrote during his years at the Benedictines' monastery, called Inspirações do Claustro (in English: Cloister Inspirations). The poems of it speak mostly of the solitude Freire suffered at the monastery, and also other subjects, such as celibacy horror; repressed desires that disturbed him and increased in him the wish to sin; the Brazilian nationalism; revolts against rules, the world and himself; obsession by death, and the mal du siècle.

Some of Freire's poems have slight Abolitionist traits; because of that, some critics consider him a forerunner of the Condorism.

He was among the first poets in Brazil to write homoerotic verses.

== Works ==
- Autobiografia (Autobiography — 1854)
- Inspirações do Claustro (Cloister Inspirations — 1855)

Preceded by New creation	Brazilian Academy of Letters - Patron of the 25th chair	Succeeded by Franklin Dória (founder)
