= Luís Caetano Pereira Guimarães Júnior =

Brazilian writer

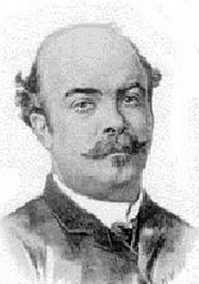
- Born: February 17, 1845; Rio de Janeiro, Brazil
- Died: May 20, 1898 (aged 53); Lisbon, Portugal

Luís Caetano Pereira Guimarães Júnior (17 February 1845, in Rio de Janeiro – 20 May 1898, in Lisbon) was a Brazilian diplomat, poet, novelist and dramaturgist.

He undertook his education in the Faculdade de Direito do Recife in 1869, in the same class of the writer Araripe Júnior. His works switched from Romanticism to Parnasianism. During his career, he also used the pseudonym Oscar d'Alva.

As a diplomat, he lived in Santiago de Chile, Roma and Lisbon, where he finally stayed and he met intellectuals such as Eça de Queiroz, Ramalho Ortigão, Guerra Junqueiro or Fialho de Almeida. He was a member and one of the founders of Academia Brasileira de Letras.

== Works ==
- Lírio branco, novel (1862);
- Uma cena contemporânea, theatre (1862);
- Corimbos, poesia (1866);
- A família agulha, novel (1870);
- Noturnos, poetry (1872);
- Filigranas, fiction (1872);
- Sonetos e rimas, poetry (1880);
- As quedas fatais, theatre;
- André Vidal, theatre;
- As jóias indiscretas, theatre;
- Um pequeno demônio, theatre;
- O caminho mais curto, theatre;
- Os amores que passam, theatre;
- Valentina, theatre;
- A alma do outro mundo, theatre (1913).

| Preceded by Pedro Luís Pereira de Sousa (patron) | Brazilian Academy of Letters - Occupant of the 31st chair 1897 — 1898 | Succeeded by João Batista Ribeiro de Andrade Fernandes |
