= Noite na Taverna =

1855 book by Álvares de Azevedo

Noite na Taverna (in English: A Night at the Tavern) is a short story collection written by Brazilian Ultra-Romantic author Álvares de Azevedo under the pen name Job Stern. It was published posthumously, in 1855, three years after Azevedo's death. The book is structured as a series of embedded narratives containing five tales, as well as a prologue and an epilogue, thus totaling seven chapters, told by a group of five men sheltering inside a tavern. It is one of the most popular and influential works of Gothic fiction in Brazilian literature.

== Plot ==
=== Chapter 1: "Uma Noite do Século" ===
The first chapter of the book, "Uma Noite do Século" ("A Night of the Century"), introduces its setting – a tavern in an undisclosed location filled with prostitutes, drunkards and libertines. At a nearby table, under the influence of alcohol, a group of five friends – Solfieri, Bertram, Gennaro, Claudius Hermann and Johann – decide to share certain events of their lives. The five tales have in common aspects such as unsuccessful love stories, cannibalism, murder, sexual violence, heavy drinking, among others.

=== Chapter 2: "Solfieri" ===
The first to share is Solfieri. When in Rome, on a rainy night, Solfieri sees a shadow crying over a window. He realizes it is a beautiful woman. She leaves the house and Solfieri decides to follow her, and they ultimately arrive at a nearby cemetery. There, the woman cries, kneeling before a headstone, as Solfieri falls asleep watching her from afar.

One year later, Solfieri, wandering the streets of Rome after taking part in an orgy, ends into a church inadvertently. He sees a coffin and, after listening to breathing noises inside, opens it, and sees the cemetery lady he met the year before inside it. After realizing that she is still alive (but in a cataleptic state), he carries her through the city. Arriving at his home, the woman dies two days later following a very high fever. Solfieri buries her under the floorboards of his bedroom and pays a sculptor for a statuette built in the woman's likeness.

=== Chapter 3: "Bertram" ===
Bertram tells the story of his ill-fated love for a Spanish woman from Cádiz, named Angela. Amidst their romance, Bertram's sick father, who lives in Denmark, calls for him. Bertram answers, returning two years later just to find Angela has married another man and has a son with him. Despite this, Bertram tries to keep his affair with her, but Angela's husband finds them out. Before her husband can kill her, Angela kills him and her child, and flees with Bertram.

One day, without any explanation, Angela leaves him. Bertram sinks into despair as he tries to forget her. Subdued by woe, he faints in the middle of a street and is run over by a chariot. The passengers of the chariot, an old man and his 18-year-old daughter, help him and take him to their mansion so he can recover. Bertram falls in love with the lady and they flee together, but he ultimately gets bored with her and sells the lady to a pirate in a card game. Later, he would learn that the girl poisoned the pirate and committed suicide by throwing herself in the sea.

Having moved to Italy, Bertram contemplates suicide there, but when he is about to drown himself, he is saved by a sailor whom he kills unintentionally. Bertram spends some time in the sailor's corvette, where he falls in love with the captain's wife, who reciprocates his feelings.

In the midst of their affair, the ship is attacked by pirates and both ships sink. The captain, his wife, Bertram and two other unnamed sailors are able to save themselves in a raft. Eventually, with no water or food and the two unnamed sailors being washed out by the sea, the three survivors hold a draw to discover who will be killed and serve as food for the others. The captain is chosen, but refuses to accept his fate, fighting Bertram for his life. The captain loses the fight and Bertram and the captain’s daughter are forced to eat him because of the lack of food, managing to survive for two more days.

Arriving at a beach, both already weakened by hunger, the woman asks Bertram for a last moment of love before her death. Afraid of dying, Bertram strangles her and lives at the beach in complete solitude until he is found by a British brig that rescues him.

=== Chapter 4: "Gennaro" ===
The painter Gennaro reminisces of when he was the young apprentice of the famous Godofredo Walsh. Walsh had a young, beautiful wife named Nauza, whom Gennaro loved, and a daughter named Laura, who in turn loved Gennaro. Laura, sneaking into Gennaro’s bedroom late at night, gets pregnant, but when she proposes marriage to him, he declines. Displeased, she gradually sinks into depression and dies, taking the baby with her.

The old painter, not knowing anything, visits his daughter's bedroom every night and Gennaro then starts sleeping with Godofredo’s wife. One evening, however, he is able to make Gennaro confess everything. Days later, Godofredo takes Gennaro to a cliff and tries to kill him. Surviving the fall, he decides to return to the painter's house – initially planning to apologize, but later changing his mind and deciding to take revenge. However, upon arriving at the painter's house, Gennaro finds both Nauza and Godofredo already dead.

=== Chapter 5: "Claudius Hermann" ===
Claudius Hermann, an assiduous gambler, spots the beautiful Duchess Eleonora at a horse race and falls in love with her at first sight. He meets her once more in a theatre later on, and during an entire week he stalks her.

In a certain night, he bribes one of the duchess' lackeys for permission to enter her house for an hour, and also obtains a copy of her bedroom's keys. He puts sedative in the duchess' wine and has sex with her, returning for many nights.

One day, however, her husband, Duke Maffio, inadvertently drinks some of the sedative as well. Desperate and afraid of being caught, Claudius plans to kill him, but changes his mind and kidnaps Eleonora instead while she is still sleeping. Arriving in an inn, she wakes up, and Claudius tells her everything, forcing her to stay with him. Optionless, she accepts.

Some days later, Claudius has to leave in order to take care of some affairs; when he returns home, he finds the duchess and her husband dead.

=== Chapter 6: "Johann" ===
Johann's story begins in a different tavern, located in Paris. He was playing a game of carambole with a blond-haired man named Arthur. Johann was losing the game, while Arthur only needed to score one point to win. When it is Johann's turn to play, Arthur bumps into the table (accidentally or not), detouring Johann's ball, thus making him lose the game. Infuriated, he challenges Arthur to a duel, which he accepts. They stop at a hotel to get the guns, and the blond man writes two letters. They head to a deserted and dark street. In there, they choose their guns – but only one is loaded.

They shoot. It is revealed that Johann's gun was the loaded one, and Arthur, before supposedly dying, hands Johann the letters he wrote. The first letter is addressed to Arthur's mother, and the other one is addressed to his girlfriend; he also hands Johann her address and an engagement ring. Pretending to be Arthur, Johann then decides to steal his girlfriend.

In the morning after they sleep together, Johann is attacked by a mysterious man. After a short struggle, he kills the man. However, after a close inspection, he discovers that the man he killed was his own brother, and Arthur's girlfriend was his sister.

=== Chapter 7: "Último Beijo de Amor" ===
In the last chapter, "Último Beijo de Amor" ("Last Love Kiss"), the orgy ends; everyone is sleeping. A mysterious hooded figure walks into the tavern and kills Johann, and then heads toward a man named Arnold.

The figure is revealed to be Giorgia, Johann's sister, and Arnold is actually Arthur (who was saved by a passerby after the duel) under a false name. Giorgia reveals to Arthur that she wanted to get her revenge on Johann, and having done so, the honor Johann stole from her when they slept together is finally restored.

After exchanging some love words with Arthur, both decide to commit suicide.

== Adaptations ==
A graphic novel adaptation, illustrated by Walmir Amaral and published through Editora Ática, came out in 2011.

An independent short film based on the book received a limited release around some Brazilian film festivals and arthouse cinemas on March 6, 2014. Directed and written by Yghor Boy, it stars Renato Basilla as Solfieri, Renan Bleastè as Bertram, Hélcio Henriques as Gennaro, Raul Figueiredo as Claudius Hermann, Sérgio Siveiro as Johann, Ricardo Merini as Arnold/Arthur and Mayara Constantino as Giorgia. Intertwined between each tale are glimpses of the academic life of Álvares de Azevedo himself, who is portrayed by Victor Mendes.

The film won the Prêmio ABC de Cinematografia for Best Direction of Photography in a Student Film in May 2015.
