= As Primaveras =

1859 poetry book by Casimiro de Abreu

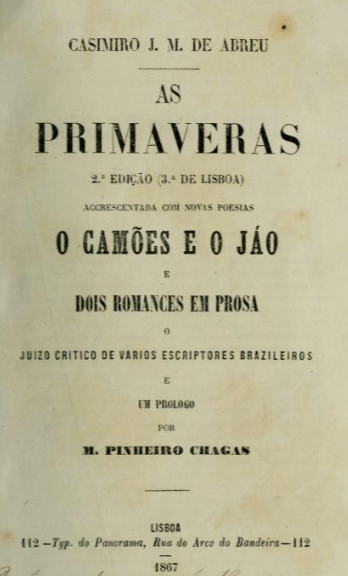
- Title page for As Primaveras (1867 edition)
- Author: Casimiro de Abreu
- Language: Portuguese language
- Genre: Poetry
- Publisher: Imprensa Nacional
- Publication date: 1859
- Publication place: Brazil
- Media type: Hardcover

As Primaveras (in English: Springtimes) is an 1859 poetry book by Brazilian Romantic poet Casimiro de Abreu. It was the last book written by Abreu, before his death from tuberculosis in 1860. It is considered his masterpiece.

The book's publication was financed by Casimiro's father, José Joaquim Marques de Abreu, although he disapproved of Casimiro's vocation as a writer.

== Structure ==
As Primaveras is divided in five parts: the Introduction, "Livro Primeiro" ("Book the First"), "Livro Segundo" ("Book the Second"), "Livro Terceiro" ("Book the Third") and "Livro Negro" ("Black Book"). The poems speak mostly of romantic love, longing for childhood and death, nationalism, nostalgia and homesickness.

The most famous poem of the book is "Meus oito anos" ("When I was eight").
