= Lira dos Vinte Anos =

Lira dos Vinte Anos (in English: Twenty-year-old Lyre) is a poetry anthology written by Brazilian Romantic author Álvares de Azevedo. Originally part of an aborted project that would be written in partnership with Aureliano Lessa and Bernardo Guimarães called As Três Liras (English: The Three Lyres), it was published in 1853. It is one of the few works whose publication was prepared by Álvares himself, due to his premature death on April 25, 1852.

The book is divided in three parts: the "Ariel Face" (first and third parts) and the "Caliban Face" (second part), as Álvares calls them, based on characters from Shakespeare's The Tempest. While the poems of the Ariel Face feature extreme sentimentalism, platonic love, melancholy, among others, the poems of the Caliban Face are heavily morbid, sarcastic and ironic.

From its initial publication in 1853, it would suffer many re-edits, getting to its current form in 1942.

Some studies about this book: "O belo e o disforme", Cilaine Alves; "Risos entre pares", Vagner Camilo; "Uma lira de duas cordas", Rafael Fava Belúzio.
