= Pedro Luís Pereira de Sousa =

Brazilian poet, politician, orator and lawyer

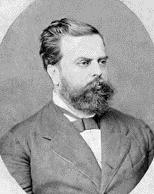
- Born: 13 December 1839; Araruama, Rio de Janeiro, Brazil
- Died: 16 July 1884 (aged 44); Bananal, São Paulo, Brazil
- Education: University of São Paulo
- Occupations: Lawyer, journalist, politician, orator, poet
- Relatives: Washington Luís Pereira de Sousa
- Writing career
- Subject: Social engagement
- Notable work: Terribilis Dea
- Movement: Romanticism

Pedro Luís Pereira de Sousa (December 13, 1839 – July 16, 1884) was a Brazilian poet, politician, orator and lawyer, adept of the "Condorist" movement. He is the patron of the 31st chair of the Brazilian Academy of Letters.

== Life ==
Pereira de Sousa was born in Araruama in 1839. He made his primary studies in the Instituto Freeze, in Nova Friburgo, where he met Casimiro de Abreu. Graduated in Law in the Faculdade de Direito da Universidade de São Paulo in 1860, he established himself as a lawyer in Rio de Janeiro. A deputy between 1864–1866 and 1878–1881, he would also become minister of Foreign Affairs in 1880 and the governor of Bahia in 1882. Among many others, he was decorated with the Order of the Rose.

He died in 1884.

== Works ==
- Terribilis Dea (1860)
- Os Voluntários da Morte (1864)
- A Sombra de Tiradentes e Nunes Machado (1866)
- Prisca Fides (1876)

== Trivia ==
- He was the uncle of former Brazilian president Washington Luís.
- His major work, Terribilis Dea, heavily influenced Castro Alves, who wrote a poem based on it, named "Deusa incruenta".

| Preceded by New creation | Brazilian Academy of Letters - Patron of the 31st chair | Succeeded by Luís Caetano Pereira Guimarães Júnior (founder) |
