= The Black Vulture =

1910 sonnet by George Sterling

- by George Sterling
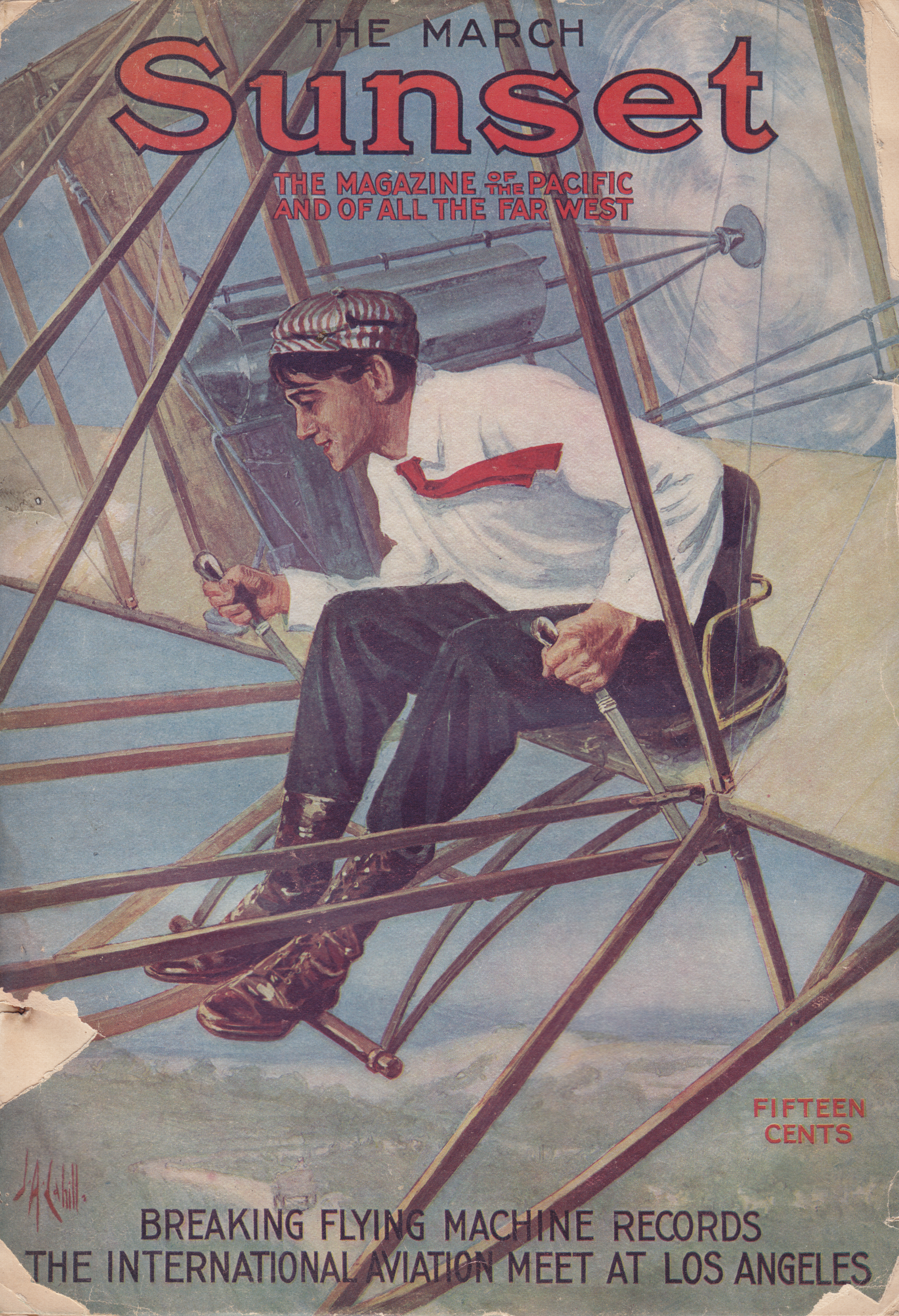
- 1910 March Sunset cover of poet George Sterling by James Arthur Cahill
- Written: 1909–1910
- First published in: March 1910 Sunset magazine
- Cover artist: James Arthur Cahill
- Country: United States
- Language: English
- Genre: nature
- Form: Petrarchan sonnet
- Meter: decasyllabic lines in iambic pentameter
- Rhyme scheme: ABBACDDC EFGEFG

"The Black Vulture" is a sonnet by American poet George Sterling first printed in March 1910. Sterling's sonnets are highly regarded. Literary historian S. T. Joshi wrote: “If there were any justice in the world, Sterling would be hailed as perhaps the most proficient sonneteer in American literature.” "The Black Vulture" was cited by Thomas E. Benediktsson in his book George Sterling as "a sonnet which became Sterling’s most consistently praised and most anthologized poem." Poet and critic William Rose Benét wrote: “As for ‘The Black Vulture,’ I think it is one of the finest sonnets in the language.” The New York Times said: “No finer sonnet has been written for many a day.” In American Literature, professor Robert G. Berkelman called it “one of Sterling’s most enduring achievements and certainly among the memorable sonnets in our literature.” After the poem's first book publication in 1911, reprints of “The Black Vulture” in newspapers, magazines, and books have kept it almost continually in print for more than a hundred years.

== Creation of the poem ==
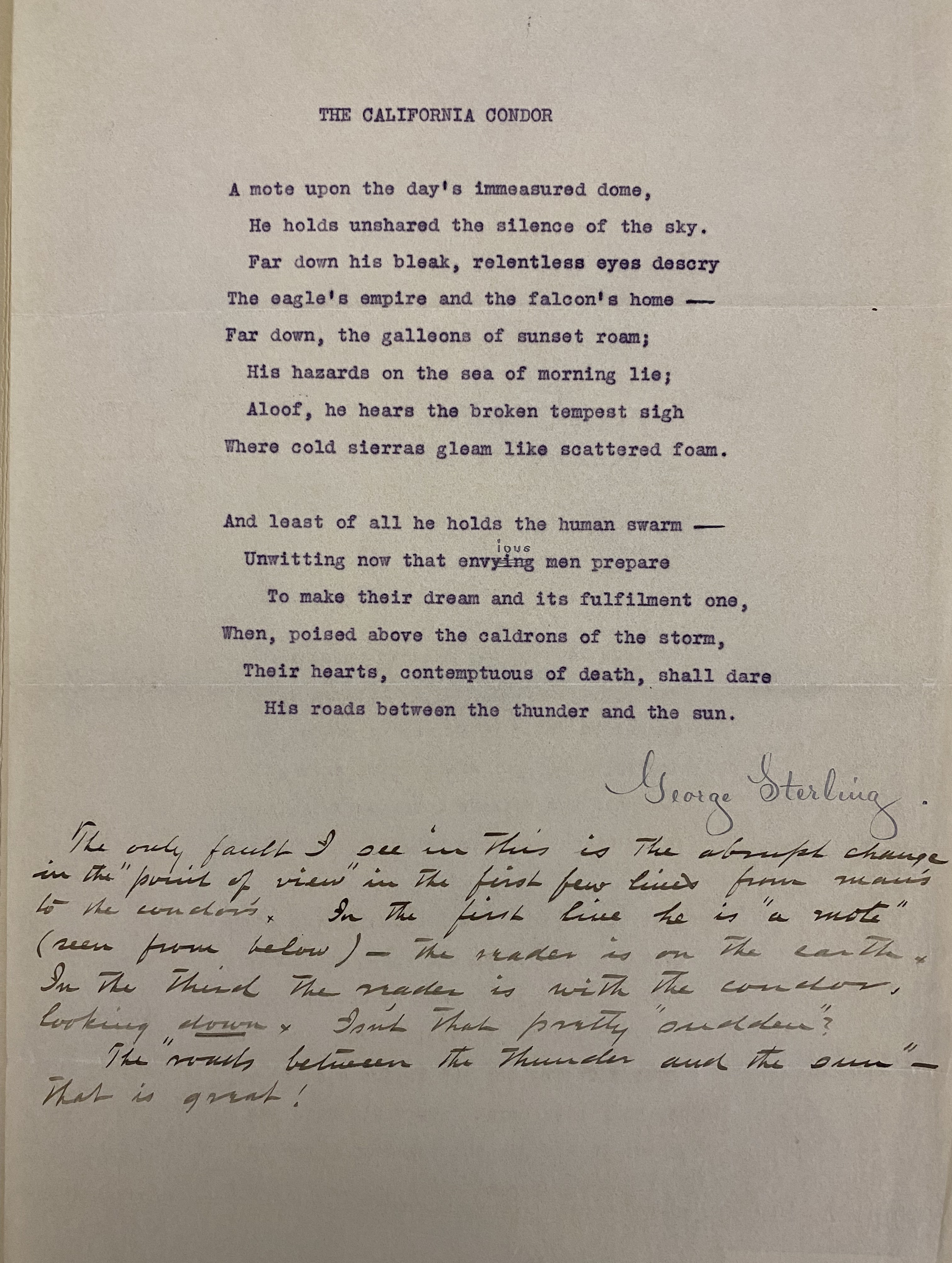
1909 The California Condor typescript by George Sterling with comments by Ambrose Bierce

“The Black Vulture” is a Petrarchan sonnet of fourteen iambic pentameter lines. George Sterling first titled his poem "The Californian Condor" or "The California Condor." Sterling wrote the sonnet in 1909 and sent "The California Condor" to his mentor Ambrose Bierce for review. Bierce responded:

The only fault I see in this is the abrupt change in the "point of view" in the first few lines from the man's to the condor's. In the first line he is "a mote" (seen from below)--the reader is on the earth. In the third line the reader is with the condor, looking down. Isn't that pretty "sudden"?
The "roads between the thunder and the sun"--that is great!

Sterling sold his sonnet to Sunset magazine, which printed it as "The Condor" in its March 1910 issue, six years and three months after the Wright Brothers’ first flight. The magazine put a color painting on its front cover of Sterling piloting a biplane (which in real life the poet never did) while wearing a red necktie (which the poet did do, and which in those days proclaimed the wearer to be a socialist). "The Condor" was reprinted by the Sapulpa [Oklahoma] Sunday Light.

Next, as Bierce suggested, Sterling changed his poem's first line from "A mote upon the day’s immeasured dome" to "Aloof within the day’s immeasured dome," made three other small changes, and retitled his revised sonnet "The Black Vulture." He included it in his 1911 poetry collection The House of Orchids and Other Poems. Sterling later changed his first line's "immeasured" to "enormous," resulting in three slightly different versions of "The Black Vulture." His final revision is the version provided here.

== Text of the poem ==
The Black Vulture

Aloof within the day’s enormous dome,
He holds unshared the silence of the sky.
Far down his bleak, relentless eyes descry
The eagle’s empire and the falcon’s home—
Far down, the galleons of sunset roam;
His hazards on the sea of morning lie;
Serene, he hears the broken tempest sigh
Where cold sierras gleam like scattered foam.

And least of all he holds the human swarm—
Unwitting now that envious men prepare
To make their dream and its fulfilment one,
When, poised above the caldrons of the storm,
Their hearts, contemptuous of death, shall dare
His roads between the thunder and the sun.

== Interpretations ==
What is “The Black Vulture” about? The cover-assigning Sunset editor and the New York Times Book Review editor seemed to agree that the poem celebrates aviation. The Times editor wrote that people had written many poems about aviation, “but we have not happened to see any other poem, having this new art or science as its theme, in which the subject is treated with so much imagination and such literary skill as have gone to the making of “The Black Vulture.”

Many readers drew other conclusions. Like all of Sterling's 500-plus sonnets, “The Black Vulture” has a first section about one topic and a second section about a related second topic. Some readers of this poem felt the first section shows nature from the soaring predator's lofty point of view, while the second section regrets people trespassing in nature.

Other readers arrived at other interpretations. High school seniors given “The Black Vulture” described a variety of points of view. One concluded: “While he is sitting on top of the world, he is not concerned with the affairs of the people beneath him.” A second senior wrote: “Worldly heights and worldly storms are nothing, and human endeavors are controlled by a black vulture—Fate.” Another elaborated: “The solitary vulture looks down from his high home on the life below him, and he thinks of man least of all though it is man who plans to execute his own dream by sharing the high dominion with the vulture.” Another said he or she thought: “From his position in the sky, the Black Vulture looks down upon the other mighty birds, the sunset, and the mountains. He looks with contempt on man and man’s dreams. This vulture, or Death, little realizes that men in their adventures have no fear of him.”

That the black vulture was Death and the poem expresses mankind's quest to avoid it has been the view of several readers, including leading historian-critic of fantasy and horror literature S. T. Joshi, who called "The Black Vulture": "a grim portrayal of the all-destroying power of Death." One college student's vehement insistence on the “Death interpretation” drove his English professor to ask Sterling what this poem means. Sterling replied:

“The Black Vulture” is a nature-poem pure and simple. There are few poems into which some kind of symbolism cannot be read, with a little imagination—and a good many where symbolism was intended. But I am not guilty in this case.
The folk of the Santa Lucia mountains call our California condor “the black vulture,” and once, when on the Big Sur river, I saw one of the great birds poised a mile or more overhead. They are larger even than the Andean condor, their wings spreading over ten feet in some specimens. It’s a fine of $1000. for shooting one, as the bird is very scarce and becoming rarer yearly. I doubt if there are 20 in all California. They range from the Big Sur (a mere stream) southward into Mexico.

== Critical response ==
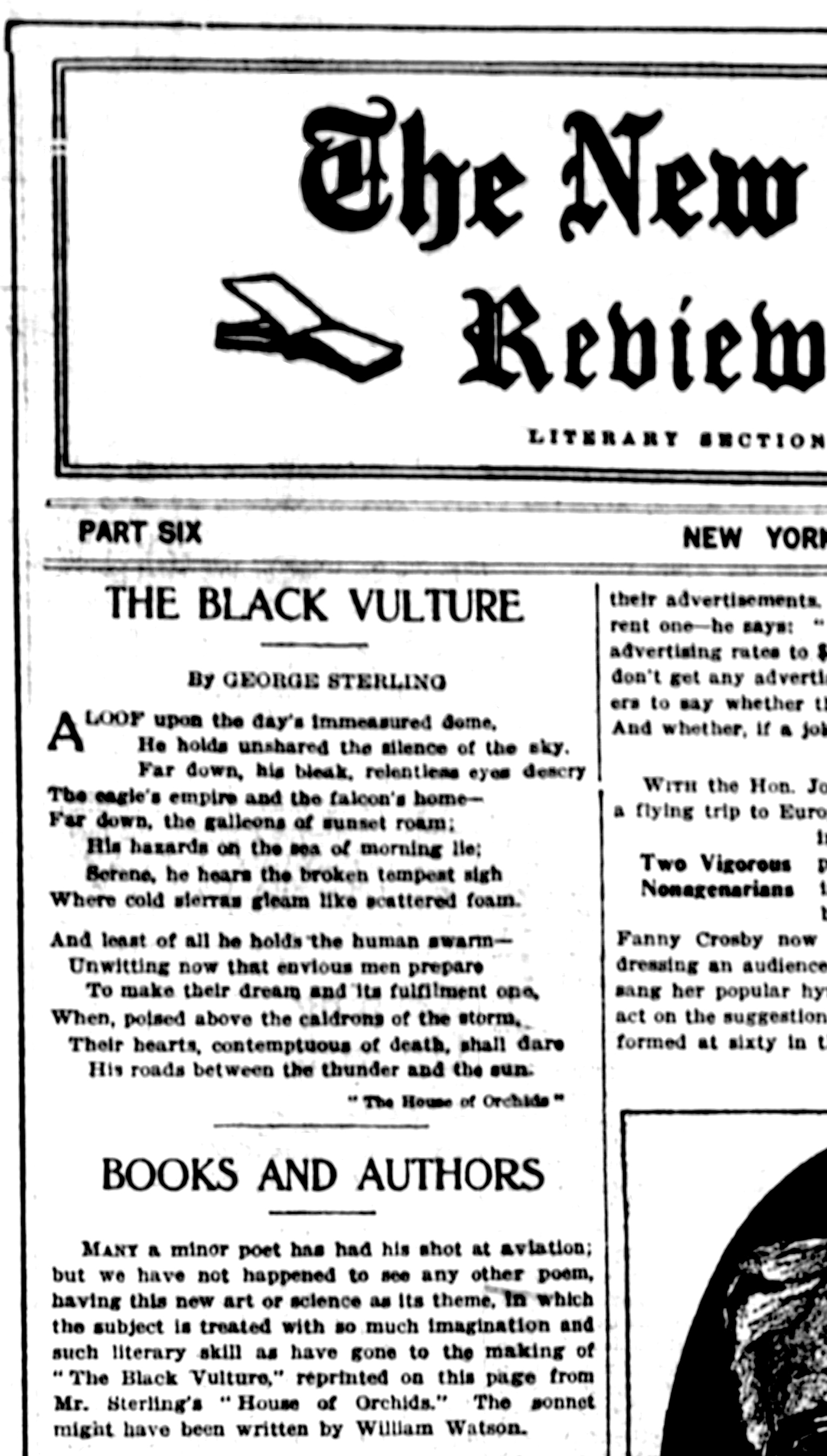
George Sterling's "The Black Vulture" on May 7, 1911 New York Times Review of Books cover

The poem's reputation mushroomed in 1911, when a New York Times editor saw "The Black Vulture" in Sterling's book The House of Orchids and Other Poems and was impressed. He placed the poem as the New York Times Review of Books front cover's lead item and praised the sonnet as showing "much imagination and literary skill." Weeks later, the New York Times Review of Books printed "The Black Vulture" again, this time with its review of The House of Orchids and Other Poems, stating, "No finer sonnet has been written for many a day."

After the New York Times highlighted “The Black Vulture,” dozens of newspapers around the country reprinted it—even one in England. Almost half the papers also reprinted the Times’ praise of the poem.

In other publications’ reviews of The House of Orchids and Other Poems, some reviewers singled out “The Black Vulture.” Poet Joyce Kilmer, in Literary Digest, decided: “By writing ‘[A] Wine of Wizardry’ and ‘The Black Vulture,’ George Sterling earned the gratitude of all lovers of poetry."

In 1917, the Book Club of California asked Sterling to select out of all his sonnets his favorite thirty-five to include in an artistically designed, limited edition book, Thirty-Five Sonnets. Sterling chose "The Black Vulture" as one of his favorites. Six years later, Sterling again chose "The Black Vulture" when New York publishing firm Henry Holt and Company asked Sterling to choose from all the poems he'd written in his first 25 years as a poet to form a collection of his Selected Poems. Reviewing that book in the New York Post, poet and critic William Rose Benét wrote: “As for ‘The Black Vulture,’ I think it is one of the finest sonnets in the language.” Elsewhere in the New York Post, critic Christopher Morley called it "a noble sonnet" and reprinted it. In 1926, shortly before his death, Sterling listed his favorite sonnets and sent his list to a publisher as a proposed pamphlet. Out of more than 500 sonnets Sterling wrote, he included "The Black Vulture" as one of his seventeen favorites. Poet Robinson Jeffers encountered the poem in a poetry anthology and wrote to Sterling: “Your ‘Black Vulture’ stood out in it like a mountain peak.”

American poet Leslie Nelson Jennings, called by critic Stephen Philips "perhaps the most versatile and splendid maker of sonnets America has produced," wrote the sonnet "Condor" as a companion poem to Sterling's, even echoing the description "mote" Sterling used in his "The Condor" first version. Originally titled "But You Sat Silent," "Condor" was first published in 1925 and was reprinted several times.

Later critics offered more varied opinions. In 1933, University of Oregon Professor Ernest G. Moll said that among recent sonnets “stand two great sonnets, “The Black Vulture” and “Aldebaran at Dusk” by George Sterling”, citing “The Black Vulture,” “because in it the poet has achieved a complete mastery of form, because of the splendor of its images, and because of the modern ring of its thought.” In 1936 bookdealer and literary historian William McDevitt wrote that poet Robinson "Jeffers has nowhere any 14 successive lines with so much sustained art and poetry a Sterling's sonnet 'The Black Vulture'." In 1973, historian Kevin Starr said Sterling's verse "occasionally possessed a sub-philosophical relationship to local materials and a passion for transcendence which forecast the achievement of Robinson Jeffers. Sterling’s sonnet ‘The Black Vulture’ suggested a mode which one wishes had been more characteristic." Thomas E. Benediktsson, in his 1980 book George Sterling, suggested this "sonnet was popular in part because it was not, like most of Sterling’s poems, disparaging of human progress; American poetry in 1911 was still very much in the service of Uplift. Furthermore, ‘The Black Vulture’ is much more available than Sterling's more allusive and ‘classical’ poems."

After Sterling's suicide in 1926, "The Black Vulture" received a small final flurry of magazine and newspaper reprintings, including the poem's third appearance in the New York Times.

That same year Voices: A Journal of Verse printed a memorial to Sterling written by poet Leslie Nelson Jennings. He had known Sterling. Jennings usually wrote sonnets using the rhyme scheme of a Shakespearean sonnet, but he wrote his tribute as a Petrarchan sonnet like “The Black Vulture.” Jennings titled his memorial tribute “Vale,” the Latin word for farewell; Sterling had loved Latin from his studies to become a Roman Catholic priest. Jennings opened his poem with "the black vulture". Many readers of Sterling's "The Black Vulture" thought Sterling's vulture was Death, and Jennings used that characterization, with the large bird's shadow silencing a small singing bird, and two people "Under the beak and talon" of Death. Jennings' unnamed two people who "slipped, self-exiled, through the enigmatic door" were Sterling's wife "Carrie" Rand Sterling (who had committed suicide eight years before him) and the Sterlings' friend Nora May French (who had committed suicide eleven years before Carrie, in the Sterlings' Carmel-by-the-Sea home).

(In the second-to-the-last line, Jennings’ word “air” means a song.)

Vale

So the black vulture slowly shut his wings,
Hovered and fell. We saw a shadow touch
Those lower levels where the small bird sings,
And in the silence we remembered much.
How two had sat and banqueted before
Under the beak and talon, how they slipped,
Self-exiled, through the enigmatic door,
The bread unbroken and the wine unsipped.

Aldebaran still hangs aloft his red
Beacon among the stars. Perhaps you share
More intimately in the old dispute,
Whether there be another table spread,
Or only fable and a broken air,
Vexing the mind, of Orpheus and his lute.

In the year 2000, when the prestigious Library of America published its anthology American Poetry: The Twentieth Century, the poem chosen by its editors to represent George Sterling was “The Black Vulture.”

== Reprints ==
Sunset magazine first printed "The Black Vulture" (titled "The Condor") in its March 1910 issue. After that first appearance, Sterling's sonnet was reprinted many times in printings and editions of newspapers, periodicals, and books, keeping "The Black Vulture" in print almost continually for more than a hundred years.

=== Reprints in newspapers ===
- Fresno Herald as "The Condor," (March 10, 1910), p. 4.
- Sapulpa [Oklahoma] Sunday Light as "The Condor," (May 1, 1910), p. 11.
- New York Times Review of Books (May 7, 1911), part 6, p. 1.
- Long Branch [New Jersey] Daily Record (May 12, 1911), p. 6.
- Allentown [Pennsylvania] Leader (May 13, 1911), p. 3.
- Parsons [Kansas] Daily Sun (May 13, 1911), p. 4.
- Biloxi Daily Herald (May 16, 1911), p. 7.
- Norfolk [Nebraska] Weekly News-Journal (May 19, 1911), p. 6.
- Beloit [Kansas] Daily Call (May 20, 1911), p. 2.
- Marysville [Ohio] Evening Tribune, (May 22, 1911), p. 4.
- Atchison [Kansas] Daily Globe (May 23, 1911), p. 3.
- Asbury Park Evening Press (May 26, 1911), p. 10.
- Bristol [England] Western Daily Press (May 27, 1911), p. 9.
- Grand Island [Nebraska] Daily Independent (June 3, 1911), p. 6.
- Colton [California] Sentinel (June 20, 1911), p. 2.
- New York Times Review of Books (June 25, 1911), p. 400.
- Northumberland [Pennsylvania] Public Press (August 11, 1911), p. 2.
- Clinton Illinois Register (September 8, 1911), p. 7
- Cleveland Star [Shelby, NC] (September 8, 1911), p. 3
- Mansfield [Ohio] News (September 11, 1911), p. 6.
- Joliet Daily News (September 30, 1911), p. 16.
- Fredericksburg [Virginia] Daily Star (November 3, 1911), p. 4.
- Mahoning Dispatch [Canfield, Ohio] (November 3, 1911), p. 5.
- Coos Bay Times [Marshfield, Oregon] (February 10, 1912), p. 4.
- Hendersonville Western North Carolina Times (May 17, 1912), p. 4.
- Minneapolis Journal (September 29, 1912), Women's Section, p. 12.
- New York Evening Post (October [unknown date], 1922.
- San Francisco Bulletin (October 31, 1922), p. 14.
- Topeka Daily Capital (December 6, 1922), p. 4.
- Alexandria [Indiana] Times-Tribune (March 31, 1923), p. 2.
- New York Times (November. 8, 1926), section 10, p. 16.
- New York Herald Tribune Books Section (April 3, 1927), section 7, part 3, p. 29.
- Kitchener Ontario Daily Record (April 26, 1927), p. 7.
- Appleton [Wisconsin] Post-Crescent (May 23, 1927), p. 6.
- (retitled "The Airman"), Philadelphia Catholic Standard and Times (June 18, 1927), p. 6.
- Tulsa Tribune (May 10, 1928), p. 6.

=== Reprints in periodicals ===
- Sunset v. 39 n. 6 (December 1917), p. 44.
- Argonaut n. 2591 (November 27, 1926), p. 11.
- Overland Monthly v. 85 n. 11 (November 1927), p. 330.
- Famous Lives v. 1 n. 2 (April 1929), p. 59.
- Rare Books and Mss.: An exceptional collection of George Sterling Firsts and A. L. S., Catalogue No. 26 (Spring, 1932) San Francisco: Paul Elder and Company, back cover page.
- Romantist n. 1 (1977), p. 35.
- Bohemian Club Library Notes n. 101 (Summer 1998), p. 11.
- Aberrant Dreams n. 9 (Autumn 2006).
- Rattlesnake Review n. 20 (Winter 2008–2009), p. 27.

=== Reprints in books ===
==== 1910s books ====
- George Sterling, The House of Orchids and Other Poems (San Francisco: A. M. Robertson, 1911), p. 30.
- The Little Book of Modern Verse, Jessie Belle Rittenhouse, ed. (Boston: Houghton Mifflin, 1913, 1917), pp. 8–9; large print edition, pp. 12–13.
- A Collection of Verse by California Poets from 1849 to 1915, Augustin S. Macdonald, ed. (San Francisco: A. M. Robertson, 1914), p. 46.
- Golden Songs of the Golden State, Marguerite Wilkinson, ed. (Chicago: A. C. McClurg, 1917), p. 57.
- George Sterling, Thirty-five Sonnets (San Francisco: Book Club of California, 1917), p. 8.
- The Home Book of American Verse: American and English, Burton Egbert Stevenson, ed. (New York: Henry Holt, third ed., 1918; fourth ed., 1918; fifth ed., 1922, 1923; sixth ed., 1926, 1930, 1937; seventh ed., 1940, 1942, 1945; eighth ed., 1949; ninth ed., 1953, 1962, 1967), pp. 1,581–1,582.
- New Voices: An Introduction to Contemporary Poetry, Marguerite Wilkinson, ed. (New York: Macmillan, 1919; second ed., 1921, 1923, 1924, 1926, 1927; third ed., 1928, 1929, 1930, 1931, 1933, 1936, 1938), p. 343.
- Modern American Poetry: An Introduction, Louis Untermeyer, ed. (New York: Harcourt, Brace & Howe, 1919), p. 54.

==== 1920s books ====
- Modern American Poetry (later titled Modern American Poetry: A Critical Anthology), Louis Untermeyer, ed. (New York: Harcourt, Brace, 1921, 1925, 1930, 1936, 1942), p. 155; as Modern American Poetry: An Anthology (later titled Modern American Poetry: A Critical Anthology), (London: Jonathan Cape, 1921, 1926, 1932), p. 155.
- George Sterling, Selected Poems (New York: Henry Holt, 1923; and San Francisco: A. M. Robertson, 1923; reprinted St. Clair Shores, MI: Scholarly Press, 1970), p. 159.
- The Le Gallienne Book of American Verse, Richard Le Gallienne, ed. (New York: Boni & Liveright, 1925), p. 276.
- Poems for Youth: An American Anthology, William Rose Benét, ed. (New York: E. P. Dutton, 1925, 1927, 1932, 1936, 1941, 1946, 1949, 1952, 1954, 1956, 1958, 1959, 1961), p. 294.
- Century Readings for a Course in American Literature, Fred Lewis Pattee, ed. (New York: Century, 1926), p. 1,059.
- George Sterling, Five Poems, [James S. Johnson], ed. (San Francisco: Windsor Press, 1927).
- The Book of Poetry, Edwin Markham, ed. (New York: William H. Wise, 1927), v. 2 p. 385.
- Poetry’s Plea for Animals: An Anthology of Justice and Mercy for Our Kindred in Fur and Feathers, Frances Elizabeth Clarke, ed. (Boston: Lothrop, Lee & Shepard, 1927), p. 85.
- Selections from American Literature, Part Two: Later American Writers, Leonidas Warren Payne Jr., ed. (Chicago: Rand McNally, 1927), p. 834.
- Oxford Book of American Verse, Bliss Carman, ed. (New York: Oxford University Press, 1927), p. 573.
- Poetry of To-day: An Anthology, Grace Shoup and Rosa Mary Redding Mikels, eds. (New York: Scribner's Sons, 1927), p. 30.
- Great Poems of the English Language: An Anthology of Verse, Wallace Alvan Briggs, ed. (New York: Robert M. McBride, 1927) p. 1, 213.
- Charles Henry Woolbert and Severina Elaine Nelson, The Art of Interpretive Speech: Principles and Practices of Effective Reading (New York: F. S. Crofts, 1927), p. 119.
- Types of Poetry, Exclusive of the Drama, Howard Judson Hall, ed. (Boston: Ginn, 1927), p. 312.
- Twentieth-Century Poetry, John Drinkwater (playwright), Henry Seidel Canby, and William Rose Benét, eds. (Boston: Houghton Mifflin, 1929), pp. 296–297.
- Modern American and British Poetry, Combined Edition, Louis Untermeyer, ed. (New York: Harcourt, Brace, 1928, 1930, 1932, 1946), p. 134; reprinted as Modern American and British Poetry: Education Manual EM 131 (Washington, DC: War Dept., 1944), p. 134.
- Three Centuries of American Poetry and Prose, Alphonso G. Newcomer, Alice E. Andrews, and Howard Judson Hall, eds. (Chicago: Scott, Foresman, 1929), p. 802.
- Songs and Stories, Edwin Markham, ed. (Los Angeles: Powell Publishing, 1929), pp. 349–350.
- Arthur Willis Leonard and Claude Fuess, Practical Précis Writing (New York: Harcourt, Brace, 1929), p. 51.

==== 1930s books ====
- Lewis G. Sterner, The Sonnet in American Literature [Ph.D. thesis] (Philadelphia, University of Pennsylvania, 1930), pp. 77–78.
- The Bird-Lovers’ Anthology, Clinton Scollard and Jessie B. Rittenhouse, eds. (Boston: Houghton Mifflin, 1930; reprinted: Plainview, NY: Books for Libraries Press, 1975), p. 253.
- Lyric America, Alfred Kreymborg, ed. (New York: Coward-McCann, 1930, 1941), p. 245.
- Songs and Stories, Edwin Markham, ed. (Los Angeles: Powell Publishing, 1931), pp. 349–350.
- American Poets 1630–1930, Mark Van Doren, ed. (Boston: Little, Brown, 1932), p. 352.
- Off to Arcady: Adventures in Poetry, Max John Herzberg, ed. (New York: American Book Company, 1933), p. 311.
- The Appreciation of Poetry, Ernest George Moll, ed. (New York: F. S. Crofts, 1933), p. 238.
- American Literature: The Social Revolt: American Literature from 1888 to 1914, Oscar Cargill, ed. (New York: Macmillan, 1933), pp. 461–462.
- Contemporary Trends: American Literature Since 1900, John Herbert Nelson and Oscar Cargill, eds. (New York: Macmillan, 1933).
- The Le Gallienne Book of English & American Verse, Richard Le Gallienne, ed. (Garden City, NY: Garden City Publishing, 1935), p. 276.
- Masterpieces of American Poets, Mark Van Doren, ed. (Garden City, NY: Garden City Publishing, 1936), p. 352.
- Poetry and Its Forms, Mason Long, ed. (Ann Arbor: Edwards Brothers, 1935; New York: G. P. Putnam's Sons, 1938), p. 312.
- The Oxford Anthology of American Literature, William Rose Benét and Norman Holmes Pearson, eds. (New York: Oxford University Press, 1938, 1939, 1941, 1943, 1944, 1945, 1946), p. 985; (1947) v. 2, p. 985.

==== 1940s books ====
- Prose and Poetry of Today: Regional America, Harriet Marcelia Lucas, ed. (Syracuse: L. W. Singer, 1941), p. 348.
- Poems for a Machine Age, Horace J. McNeil and Clarence Stratton, eds. (New York: McGraw-Hill, 1941), p. 412.

==== 1950s book ====
- The Reading Interests of Young People, George Whitefield Norvell, ed. (Boston: Heath, 1950).

==== 1960s book ====
- American Lyric Poems: From Colonial Days to the Present, Elder Olson, ed. (New York: Appleton-Century-Crofts, 1964), pp. 78–79.

==== 1970s books ====
- Kevin Starr, California and the American Dream, 1850–1915 (New York: Oxford University Press, 1973, 1986).
- The Poetry of Birds, Samuel Carr, ed. (New York: Taplinger, 1976; London: B. T. Batsford, 1976, 2023), p. 71.

==== 1980s books ====
- Best Loved Poems of the American West, John G. Gregg and Barbara T. Gregg, eds. (New York: Doubleday, 1980), pp. 475–476.
- Thomas E. Benediktsson, George Sterling (Boston: Twayne, 1980), p. 101.
- Natural History Verse: An Anthology, Gerry Cotter, ed. (Bromley, England: Christopher Helm, 1988), p. 25.

==== 2000s books ====
- American Poetry: The Twentieth Century, Volume One: Henry Adams to Dorothy Parker, Robert Hass, John Hollander, Carolyn Kizer, Nathaniel Mackey, and Marjorie Perloff, eds. (New York: Library of America, 2000), p. 72.
- The Literature of California: Volume 1, Native American Beginnings to 1945, Jack Hicks, James D. Houston, Maxine Hong Kingston, and Al Young, eds. (Berkeley: University of California Press, 2000), p. 310.
- George Sterling, The Thirst of Satan: Poems of Fantasy and Terror, S. T. Joshi, ed. (New York: Hippocampus Press, 2003), p. 111.
- California Poetry: From the Gold Rush to the Present, Dana Gioia, Chryss Yost, and Jack Hicks, eds. (Santa Clara: Santa Clara University, and Berkeley: Heyday Books, 2004), pp. 42–43.
- The Addison Street Anthology: Berkeley’s Poetry Walk, Robert Hass and Jessica Fisher, eds. (Berkeley: Heyday Books, Berkeley, 2004), pp. 28–29.
- Califauna: A Literary Field Guide, Terry Beers and Emily Elrod, eds. (Santa Clara: Santa Clara University, and Berkeley: Heyday Books, 2007), p. 247.

==== 2010s books ====
- Donald Sidney-Fryer, The Golden State Phantastics: The California Romantics and Related Subjects (Los Angeles: Phosphor Lantern, 2011), p. 113; second edition (New York: Hippocampus Press, 2012), p. 107.
- George Sterling, Complete Poetry, S. T. Joshi and David E. Schultz, eds. (New York: Hippocampus Press, 2013), v. 1 p. 121.

== Adaptations ==
- Austrian-American composer Richard Stöhr set "The Black Vulture" to music as a song (1944–1945).
- Brian Reed, “Reflection on George Sterling’s ‘The Black Vulture;’” “The Black Vulture” read by Lisa Simon: Episode Nine of Reflections West, Montana National Public Radio (November 16, 2010). Lisa Simon, producer and host. David Moore, co-host.
- In 2012, composer Leonard Christopher Gordon Rogers composed "The Black Vulture" as a song for a tenor with oboe and piano accompaniment.
- YouTube video of reading by Talking Books (February 13, 2015).
- YouTube video of reading by Poems Café (May 1, 2016).
- YouTube video of reading by The Greatest Full Audio Books by a Chapter or Two (July 13, 2019).
- YouTube video of reading by Create a Happy Life (March 12, 2021).

== Monument ==
In October, 2003, a plaque with the text of "The Black Vulture" was installed at 2080 Addison Street, Berkeley, California.

== See also ==
Condorism, a 1860s-1880s Brazilian Romanticism literary movement based on taking a condor's point of view: solitary, flying high, and seeing things clearly from a great distance.
