= Laurindo Rabelo =

Brazilian poet (1826–1864)

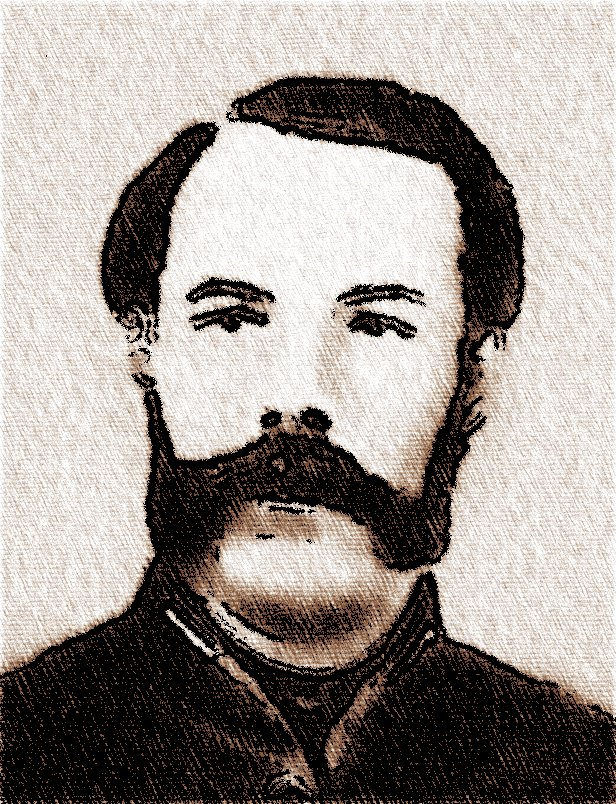
- Born: Laurindo José da Silva Rabelo; July 8, 1826; Rio de Janeiro City, Rio de Janeiro, Brazil
- Died: September 28, 1864 (aged 38); Rio de Janeiro City, Rio de Janeiro, Brazil
- Occupations: Poet, teacher, doctor
- Spouse: Adelaide Luísa Cordeiro
- Writing career
- Pen name: Poeta-Lagartixa
- Notable work: Trovas
- Movement: Romanticism

Laurindo José da Silva Rabelo (July 8, 1826 – September 28, 1864) was a Brazilian Ultra-Romantic poet, teacher and medician. Famous for his lundu lyrics and satires, he won the epithet of "the Brazilian Bocage", and, because of his physical appearance, the nickname "Poeta-Lagartixa" ("Gecko-Poet").

He is the patron of the 26th chair of Brazilian Academy of Letters.

== Life ==
Rabelo was born in Rio de Janeiro in 1826, to Ricardo José da Silva Rabelo and Luísa Maria da Conceição. His parents were very poor. Initially, he planned to follow the ecclesiastic career, and entered in a seminary, but he quit, because of intrigues among his colleagues. He tried a course at the Academia Militar das Agulhas Negras, but he couldn't make it either. Finally, he entered in a Medicine course, finishing it in Bahia, but exercising his profession in Rio.

In 1857, he became a doctor for the Army, at Rio Grande do Sul, returning definitely to Rio in 1863, becoming a History, Geography and Portuguese teacher. In 1860, he married Adelaide Luísa Cordeiro, and could finally get rid of his poverty.

He died in 1864, due to heart problems.

== Works ==
The only work written by Rabelo is the poetry book Trovas (Ballads), published in 1853. Trovas received many posthumous re-edits.

Preceded by New creation	Brazilian Academy of Letters - Patron of the 26th chair	Succeeded by Guimarães Passos (founder)
