= Santa Luzia do Itanhy =

Municipality in Sergipe, Brazil

Coordinates: 11°21′03″S 37°26′52″W

- Municipality
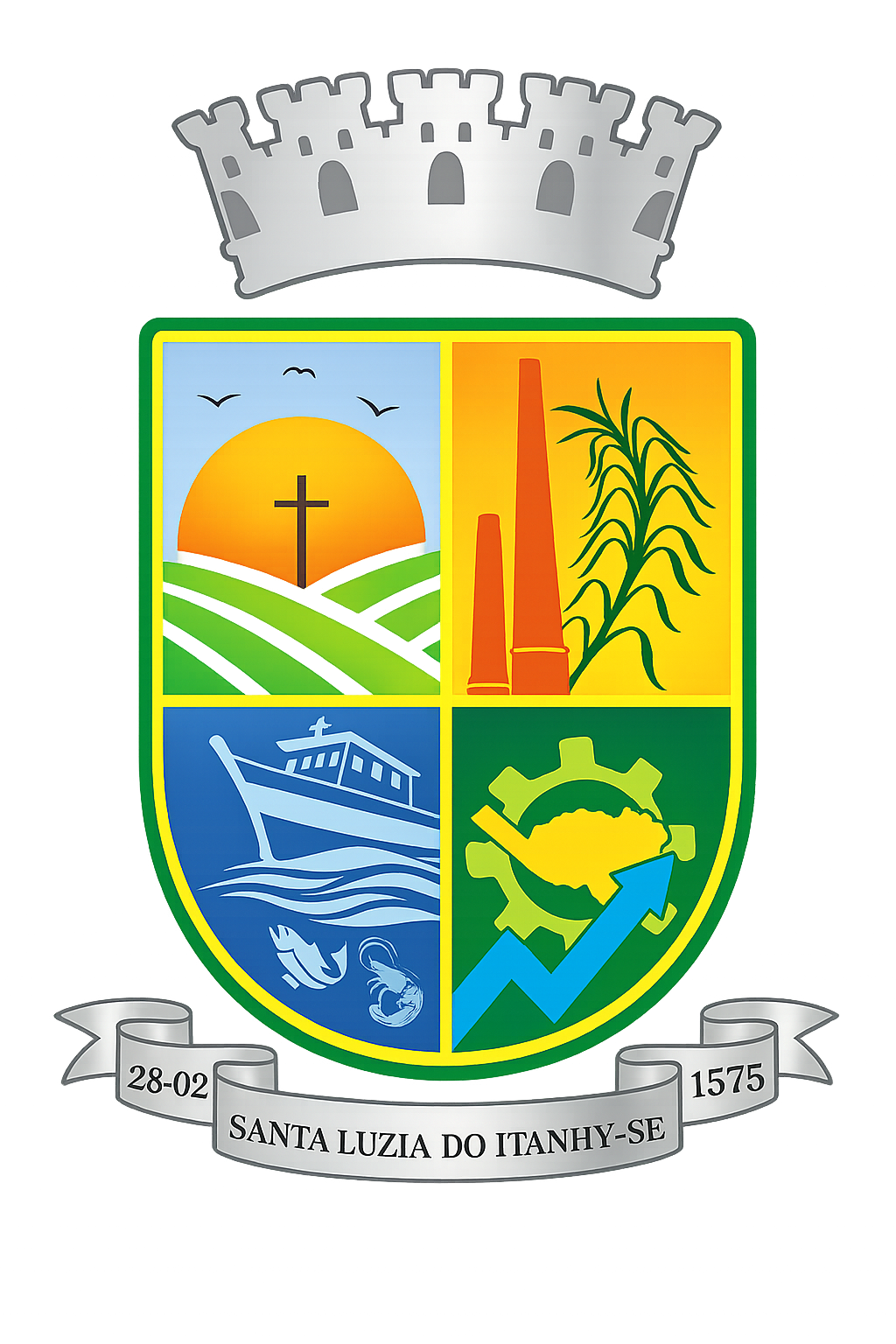
- Flag Coat of arms
- Interactive map of Santa Luzia do Itanhy
- Country: Brazil
- Time zone: UTC−3 (BRT)

Santa Luzia do Itanhy (Local pronunciation: [ˈsɐ̃tɐ lʊˈziɐ ˈdʊ itɐˈĩ]) is a municipality located in the Brazilian state of Sergipe. Its population was 14,121 (2020) and its area is 330 km^{2}.

== See also ==
- List of municipalities in Sergipe
