= Casimiro de Abreu =

Brazilian poet, novelist and playwright

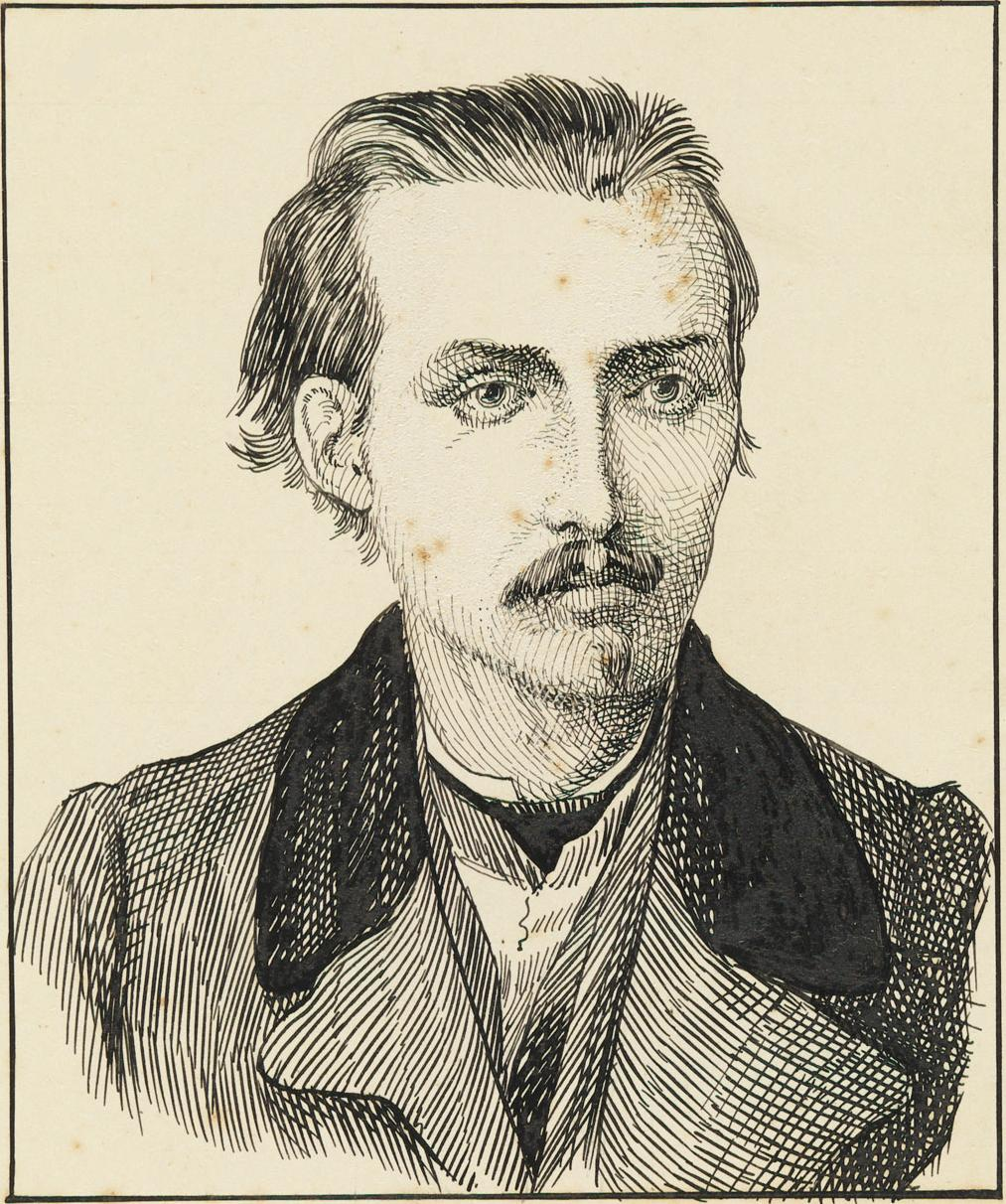
- Born: Casimiro José Marques de Abreu; 4 January 1839; Casimiro de Abreu, Rio de Janeiro, Empire of Brazil
- Died: 18 October 1860 (aged 21); Nova Friburgo, Rio de Janeiro, Empire of Brazil
- Occupations: Poet, playwright, novelist
- Known for: poetry
- Notable work: As Primaveras

Casimiro José Marques de Abreu (January 4, 1839 – October 18, 1860) was a Brazilian poet, novelist and playwright, adept of the "Ultra-Romanticism" movement. He is famous for the poem "Meus oito anos".

He is patron of the 6th chair of the Brazilian Academy of Letters. In 1999 Casimiro de Abreu's headstone was broken by an unnamed person.

== Life ==
Casimiro de Abreu was born on January 4, 1839, in the city of Barra de São João (renamed "Casimiro de Abreu" in his honor in 1925), to rich Portuguese farmers José Joaquim Marques de Abreu and Luísa Joaquina das Neves. He received only a basic education at Instituto Freeze, in Nova Friburgo, where he met and befriended Pedro Luís Pereira de Sousa. Following orders of his father, he moved to Rio de Janeiro in 1852 to dedicate himself to commerce, an activity which he hated.

With his father, he travelled to Portugal in 1853. There he began his literary career, writing for many newspapers (such as O Progresso and Ilustração Luso-Brasileira) and collaborating with Alexandre Herculano and Luís Augusto Rebelo da Silva, among others. During his stay in Portugal, he wrote his first works: the theater play Camões e o Jau (influenced by Almeida Garrett's poem Camões), the novel Carolina, published under feuilleton form, and the first chapters of a novel which he would never finish: Camila.

In 1857, he returned to Rio, where he became a collaborator for the newspapers A Marmota, O Espelho, Revista Popular and Correio Mercantil. While working for the latter, he met Manuel Antônio de Almeida and Machado de Assis.

In 1859, he published his most famous work, the poetry book As Primaveras (Springtimes). Its publication was financed by his father, although he disapproved Casimiro's literary vocation.

Suffering from tuberculosis, Casimiro moved to Nova Friburgo in order to recover, but he died at age 21 on October 18, 1860.

== Works ==
- Camões e o Jau (1856)
- Carolina (1856)
- Camila (unfinished novel — 1856)
- A Virgem Loura: Páginas do Coração (1857)
- As Primaveras (1859)

| Preceded by New creation | Brazilian Academy of Letters - Patron of the 6th chair | Succeeded by Teixeira de Melo (founder) |
