= Graça Aranha =

Brazilian writer and diplomat (1868–1931)

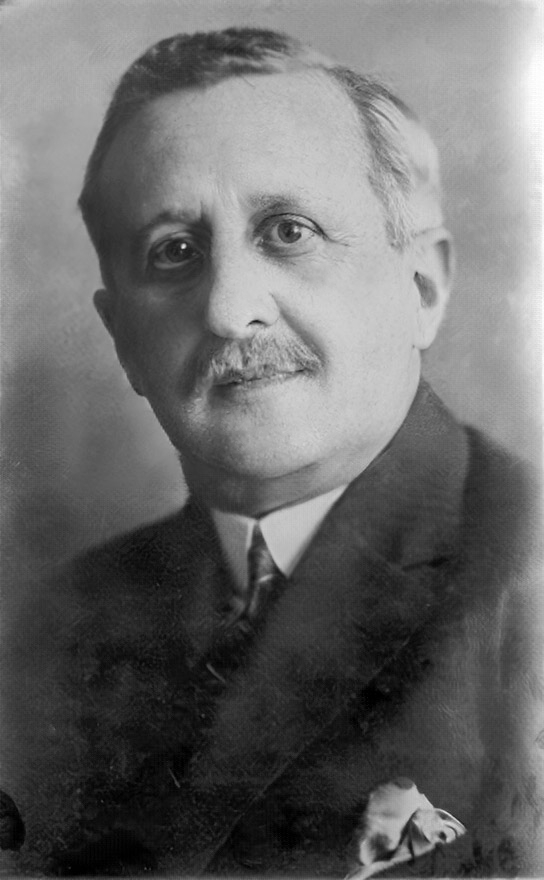
- Born: José Pereira da Graça Aranha; 21 June 1868; São Luís, Maranhão, Empire of Brazil
- Died: 26 January 1931 (aged 62); Rio de Janeiro, Federal District, Brazil
- Education: Recife Law School
- Occupations: novelist, diplomat
- Writing career
- Notable work: Canaã
- Literary movement: Modernism

José Pereira da Graça Aranha (June 21, 1868 – January 26, 1931) was a Brazilian writer and diplomat, considered to be a forerunner of the Modernism in Brazil. He was also one of the organizers of the Brazilian Modern Art Week of 1922.

He founded and occupied the 38th chair of the Brazilian Academy of Letters from 1897 until his death in 1931. However, he would break all his relations with the Academy in 1924, accusing it of being "old-fashioned".

== Life ==
Graça Aranha was born in São Luís, to a rich and cultured family, son of journalist Temístocles da Silva Maciel Aranha and Maria da Glória da Graça. He was a prodigy, having completed his secondary studies when 13 years old, and went to study Law in Recife. He graduated with honours in 1886 and travelled to the South to work. He became a judge in Porto do Cachoeiro, a village in the backlands of the state of Espírito Santo. This experience was used by him in one of his best known novels, Canaã, a great editorial success in 1902. The novel explored the conflicts of the Brazilian immigrants. According to author Raymond Leslie Williams:

Along with Os Sertões (by Euclides da Cunha), Canaã was one of the most widely read and discussed books in Brazil in the early part of the century. Canaã is a work of ideas rather than actions, and one of the central ideas that Graça Aranha promotes is that culture in the broadest sense (cultura) is the ultimate answer to society's ills.

Without having published any books, Graça Aranha was invited to be one of the 40 founding members of the Brazilian Academy of Letters in 1897, by Machado de Assis, Joaquim Nabuco and Lúcio de Mendonça.

In 1900, he was admitted to the Foreign Service as a career diplomat. He worked as such for the next 20 years. While he was stationed in Paris, France, he wrote another success in 1911, the theater drama Malazarte. He retired as a diplomat in 1919 and returned to Brazil in 1921.

Graça Aranha sponsored modernism in the letters and arts and had several personality clashes with the traditionalists at the Academy, headed by writer Coelho Neto. He allied himself to other budding modernists of São Paulo and organized the revolutionary Week of Modern Art in February 1922. He opened the week under booing of an hostile audience, with a conference titled "The aesthetic emotion in modern art".

Shortly before the "Week", Graça Aranha published in 1921 an influential theoretical essay, "Estética da Vida" (An Aesthetics of Life), where he analysed the relationship of Brazilian soul with nature, a recurrent theme at the time. He argued that the three main races had formed the "soul" or essence of the Brazilian people by adding three basic emotions to culture: the Portuguese's melancholy, African childishness and "cosmic terror", and the Indians' "metaphysics of terror", or the use of ghosts. He proposed that Brazilian culture should strive to achieve a new relationship to nature, based on the incorporation of such feelings into art and by overcoming the ethnic differences by means of an integration between the I and the cosmos.

Due to his participation, Graça Aranha was ostracised in the Academy, but he persisted, to the point even that on June 19, 1924 he stated in a conference, titled "The modern spirit" at the Academy, that its creation had been an error. A few months later, on October 18, he resigned from the Academy. In the same year, he founded with Renato Almeida a modernist literature review and magazine, Movimento Brasileiro, which lasted until just after his death.

His last novel, published in 1929 was A Viagem Maravilhosa (The Marvelous Journey), which was not so well received by the critics. He also wrote an incomplete autobiography, which was published posthumously in 1931.

Aranha died in Rio. After his death, a group of intellectuals and friends established the Graça Aranha Foundation, a project which was devised by him. One of the Foundation's aims was to award prized in the arts and literature to distinguished Brazilians who excelled in these fields. Among the most famous awardees were writers Jorge Amado, Rachel de Queiroz, José Lins do Rego, Érico Verissimo, Clarice Lispector, Lêdo Ivo and Alphonsus de Guimaraens Filho. The Foundation, which was maintained by Nazareth Prado, closed down only a year later, when funds for awarding prizes were exhausted.

== Bibliography ==
- Canaã, 1902 (English Title: Canaan, 1920 ISBN 0-85051-526-2) - French title: CHANAAN, 1910
- Malazarte, 1911
- Estética da Vida, 1921 (An Aesthetics of Life)
- Correspondência de Machado de Assis e Joaquim Nabuco, 1923
- O Espírito Moderno, 1924 (The Modern Spirit)
- Manifesto de Marinetti e seus companheiros, 1926
- A viagem maravilhosa, 1929 (The Marvelous Journey)
- O meu próprio romance, 1931 (My Own Novel)
- Obra Completa, org. Afrânio Coutinho, 1969 (Complete Works)

Preceded by Tobias Barreto (patron)	Brazilian Academy of Letters - Occupant of the 38th chair 1897 — 1931	Succeeded by Alberto Santos-Dumont
