= Joaquim de Sousa Andrade =

Brazilian poet (1833–1902)

Sousândrade
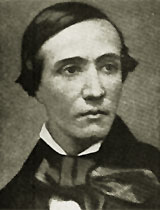
- A photograph depicting Andrade
- Born: Joaquim de Sousa Andrade; 9 July 1833; Guimarães, Maranhão, Brazil
- Died: 20 April 1902 (aged 68); São Luís, Maranhão, Brazil
- Education: Sorbonne
- Occupation: Poet
- Writing career
- Pen name: Sousândrade
- Notable works: Harpas Selvagens, Guesa
- Movement: Romanticism

Joaquim de Sousa Andrade, better known by his pseudonym Sousândrade (9 July 1833 – 20 April 1902), was a Brazilian poet, adept of the "Condorist" movement. His poetry, exceedingly innovative for the time it was published, is now considered an early example of Symbolism and Modernism in Brazil.

He also designed the flag of the Brazilian State of Maranhão.

== Biography ==
Sousândrade was born in the city of Guimarães, in the Brazilian State of Maranhão, in 1833. He published his first poetry book, Harpas Selvagens (Wild Harps), in 1857. He travelled to many countries, such as France (where he graduated in Linguistics and mining engineering at Sorbonne) and the United States, where he settled in 1871. It was while in the U.S.A. that he wrote Guesa, an epic poem based on a [Muisca] legend about a teenager Indian who is going to be sacrificed to the Sun God. Guesa is characterized by the employment of neologisms and vertiginous metaphors; thus, it is considered by some critics a precursor work of Modernism, however this was only acknowledged decades after his death. From 1871 to 1879 he was secretary and collaborator for the periodical O Novo Mundo, directed by José Carlos Rodrigues in New York City.

Returning to Maranhão, in order to commemorate the proclamation of the republic in Brazil, he became president of the mayor's office of São Luís in 1890. He founded many schools, realized reforms in education and idealized the flag of Maranhão. He also planned to be a senator in 1890, but quit before the elections were held.

The flag of Maranhão, designed by Andrade

Sousândrade died poor, forgotten and allegedly mentally ill in São Luís, in 1902. His works, forgotten for decades, were only rediscovered in the 1960s and the 1970s, thanks to the efforts of Augusto and Haroldo de Campos. Ironically, he has said once of his poem Guesa, in 1877:

People said to me more than once that my Guesa Errante will be read only 50 years later [after its publication]. I got sad — a deception of who wrote it 50 years before.

== Works ==
- Harpas Selvagens (1857)
- Guesa (1871)
- Harpa de Ouro (1888/1889)
- Novo Éden (1893)

== See also ==
- List of mayors of São Luís, Maranhão
