= Álvares de Azevedo =

Brazilian poet, short story writer and playwright (1831–1852)

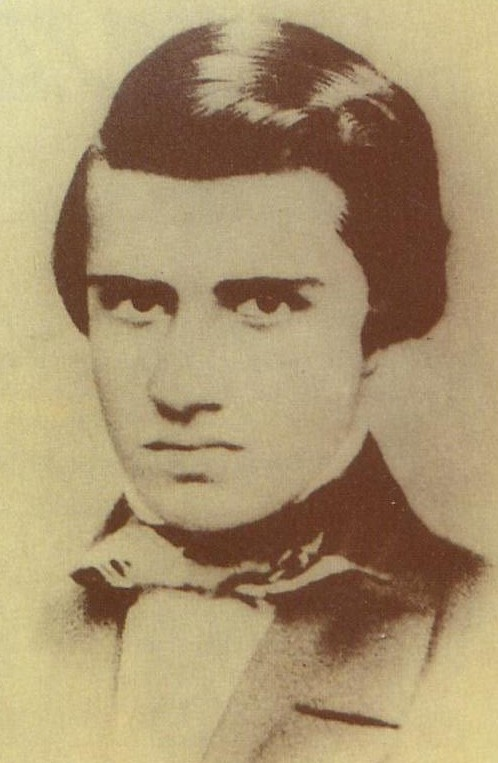
- A picture of Azevedo taken during the late 1840s
- Born: Manuel Antônio Álvares de Azevedo; September 12, 1831; São Paulo, São Paulo, Empire of Brazil
- Died: April 25, 1852 (aged 20); Rio de Janeiro, Rio de Janeiro, Brazil
- Resting place: Saint John the Baptist Cemetery, Rio de Janeiro, Brazil
- Education: University of São Paulo
- Occupations: Poet, playwright, short story writer, essayist, Law student
- Relatives: Inácio Manuel Álvares de Azevedo (father); Maria Luísa Mota Azevedo (mother)
- Writing career
- Pen name: Job Stern
- Language: Portuguese
- Period: 19th century
- Genres: Theatre, poetry, essay
- Notable works: Noite na Taverna; Macário; Lira dos Vinte Anos
- Movements: Romanticism, Ultra-Romanticism

Manuel Antônio Álvares de Azevedo (September 12, 1831 – April 25, 1852), affectionately called "Maneco" by his close friends, relatives and admirers, was a Brazilian Romantic poet, short story writer, playwright and essayist, considered to be one of the major exponents of Ultra-Romanticism and Gothic literature in Brazil. His works tend to play heavily with opposite notions, such as love and death, platonism and sarcasm, sentimentalism and pessimism, among others, and have a strong influence of Musset, Chateaubriand, Lamartine, Goethe, Heine and – above all – Byron.

All of his works were published posthumously due to his premature death at only 20 years old after a horse-riding accident. They acquired strong cult following as years went by, particularly among youths of the goth subculture.

He is the patron of the second chair of the Brazilian Academy of Letters, and of the ninth chair of the Paulista Academy of Letters.

== Biography ==
Azevedo was born into a wealthy family in São Paulo, on September 12, 1831. Son of Law student Inácio Manuel Álvares de Azevedo and Maria Luísa Azevedo (née Mota), a popular myth says that he was given birth in the library of the University of São Paulo Law School, but it actually happened on the house of his maternal grandfather, Severo Mota. He also had a sister and a younger brother, Inácio Manuel Júnior, but he died prematurely in 1835. The death proved to be an early source of shock for the young Álvares.

In 1833, Álvares moved with his family to Rio de Janeiro, and in 1840 he enrolled at the Colégio Stoll, in the bairro of Botafogo. In 1844 he temporarily returned to São Paulo with his uncle, going back to Rio in the following year, where he enrolled at the Colégio Pedro II. There he learned English, French and German, and, being a very avid reader, got acquainted with the works of Lord Byron, François-René de Chateaubriand, Victor Hugo, George Sand, William Shakespeare, John Keats, Percy Bysshe Shelley, Manuel du Bocage, Dante Alighieri, Alfred de Musset, Johann Wolfgang von Goethe, Alphonse de Lamartine and Thomas Chatterton, which would heavily influence his writing style.

While at school, Azevedo drifted towards the moderate liberalism of Lamartine and François Guizot. In his poem "Rex Lugebit" and in his "Speech delivered at the inaugural session of the Academy Society – Philosophical Essay, May 9, 1850", Azevedo condemns the despotic practices of the Brazilian government.

Having graduated in 1846 from the Colégio Pedro II, he was admitted to the University of São Paulo Law School in the following year, where he befriended poets José Bonifácio the Younger (the grandnephew of famous Brazilian statesman José Bonifácio de Andrada e Silva), Aureliano Lessa and Bernardo Guimarães. Alongside these poets and others, he founded the infamous "Sociedade Epicureia" ("Epicurean Society"), a mythical club heavily based upon Epicurean and bohemian thought, and also planned a work in conjunction with Lessa and Guimarães, the poetry book As Três Liras (The Three Lyres). However, the As Três Liras project never came to be; the only surviving part of it today is the book Lira dos Vinte Anos, published one year after Azevedo's death, in 1853. He also founded in 1849 the official magazine of the Sociedade Ensaio Filosófico Paulistano, whose publication ceased in 1856.

Because of his fragile health and the murky weather of São Paulo, Azevedo contracted tuberculosis. He then abandoned college and moved to his grandfather's farm in Rio, where the weather was warmer, in order to mitigate his disease's symptoms; there he fell from a horse and fractured his iliac fossa. After an unsuccessful surgery, he died, on April 25, 1852, being only 20 years old. It is a common misconception that he died directly from the tuberculosis. He was buried one day later at the Saint John the Baptist Cemetery; his last words before his death were reported to be "Que fatalidade, meu pai!" ("What a fatality, my father!"). Coincidentally, one of the last poems Azevedo wrote prior to his death was entitled "Se Eu Morresse Amanhã" ("If I Died Tomorrow") – the poem was read at his funeral by Manuel Antônio de Almeida, who also happened to be one of Azevedo's cousins.

Another one of Azevedo's cousins, Maria Catarina de Abreu Sodré, eventually married famous novelist Joaquim Manuel de Macedo, who allegedly based the character Carolina of his novel A Moreninha on her.

== Works ==
- Lira dos Vinte Anos (1853; poetry anthology)
- Macário (1855; theater play)
- Noite na Taverna (1855; short story book, under pen name Job Stern)
- O Conde Lopo (1886; an epic poem that remains only in fragments today)
- O Poema do Frade (1890; narrative poem)

Azevedo also wrote many letters and essays, and translated into Portuguese numerous poems by Victor Hugo, Lord Byron's Parisina, William Shakespeare's Othello's fifth act and Heinrich Heine's poem "Sag' mir wer einst die Uhren erfund" (present in his Lira dos Vinte Anos under the title "Relógios e Beijos"). He also wrote a novel, O Livro de Fra. Gondicário; however, the only extant parts of it today are two fragments of its third chapter.

== Representations in popular culture ==
- Azevedo is the main character of Mário Teixeira's 2009 young adult novel Alma de Fogo (ISBN 9788508126774). The novel's premise is that a serial killer is on the loose in the streets of São Paulo, and Azevedo decides to investigate alongside his friends Aureliano Lessa (who is unjustly accused of being the killer) and Bernardo Guimarães.
- Noite na Taverna was adapted into a film in 2014, in which Azevedo appears as a character portrayed by Victor Mendes.
- A semi-fictionalized biography of Azevedo, Delírio, Poesia e Morte (ISBN 9788564590861), was written by Luciana Fátima and released on June 27, 2015, through Editora Estronho. Fátima previously wrote a lengthy essay regarding Azevedo's life and œuvre in 2009, entitled Álvares de Azevedo: O Poeta que Não Conheceu o Amor Foi Noivo da Morte (ISBN 9788574199047).
  - Alongside her husband Arlindo Gonçalves, Fátima wrote in 2019 the novel Ad Infinitum (ISBN 9786580559022), published by Editora Clepsidra; its plot focuses on a meeting between the spirits of Azevedo and Joy Division's vocalist Ian Curtis in the afterlife.
  - Another semi-fictional biography, A Vida Secreta de um Poeta (ISBN 9786585018036) by Maicon Tenfen, was published in 2022 through Editora Ronin.
- A 2014 children's book by Márcia Abreu, Morrer Amanhã (ISBN 9788532290908), elaborates a story based on the friendship between Azevedo and a fictional character, the Afro-Brazilian slave Tonico.

Preceded by New creation	Brazilian Academy of Letters - Patron of the 2nd chair	Succeeded by Coelho Neto (founder)
