= Aureliano Lessa =

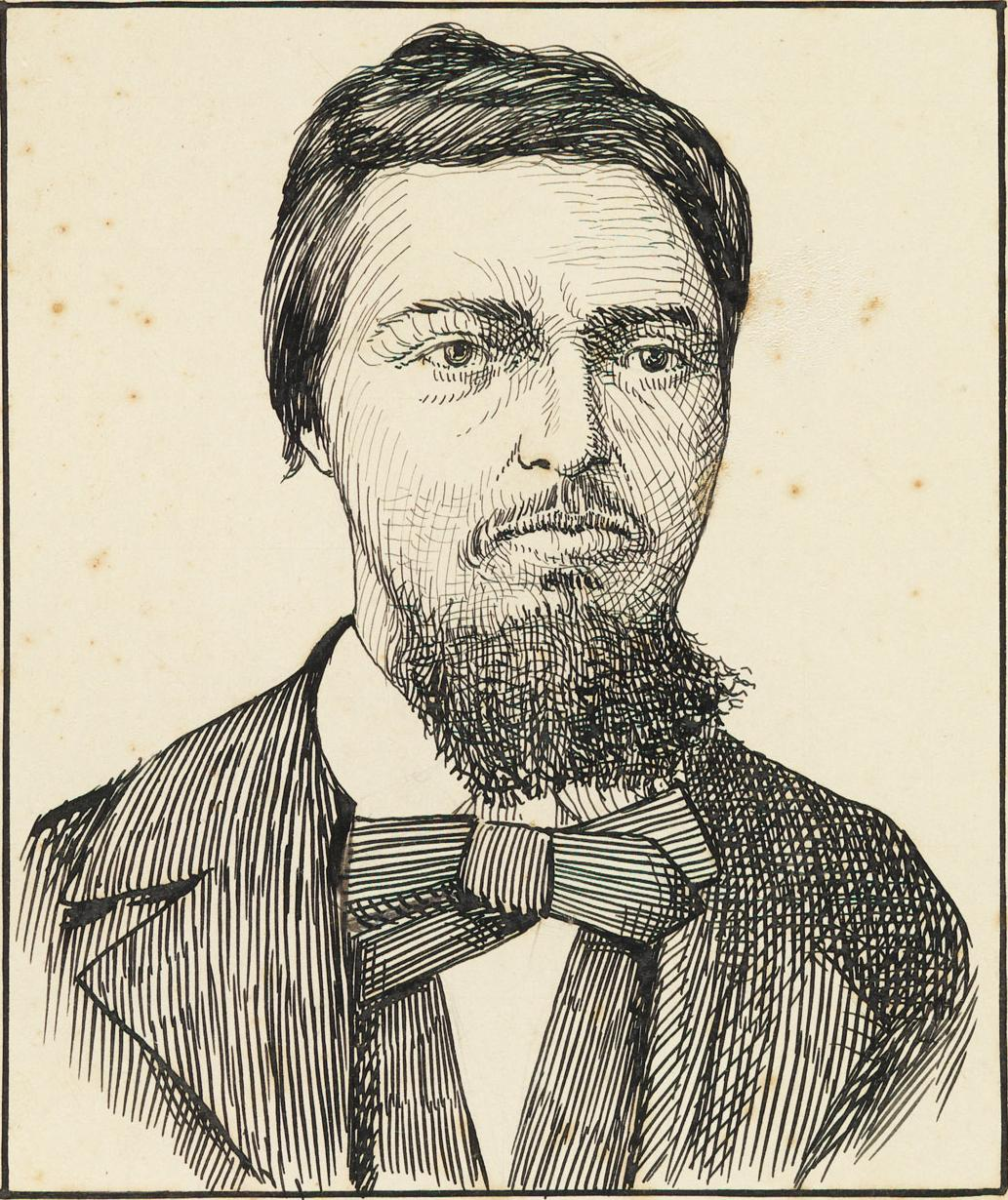
- Born: Aureliano José Lessa; 1828; Diamantina, Brazil
- Died: 21 February 1861 (aged 32–33); Serro, Brazil
- Education: Faculdade de Direito de Olinda
- Occupations: Poet, journalist
- Writing career
- Subject: Mal du siècle
- Notable work: Poesias Póstumas
- Literary movement: Romanticism

Aureliano José Lessa (1828–1861) was a Brazilian poet, adept of the "Ultra-Romanticism" movement. Born in Minas Gerais in 1828, he moved to São Paulo in 1847 to study Law, but received his bachelor degree at the Faculdade de Direito de Olinda, in Pernambuco, in 1851. He worked as attorney general in the city of Ouro Preto, and also as a lawyer in the cities of Diamantina and Serro.

During his stay at São Paulo he met the authors Álvares de Azevedo and Bernardo Guimarães. With them, he planned a volume of poetry called As Três Liras (in English: The Three Lyres), that ended unsuccessful. Along with those and others, he was a member of a club named "Sociedade Epicureia" ("Epicurean Society").

Aureliano only wrote some texts to newspapers of São Paulo and Minas Gerais during his lifetime. His poems were compiled and published posthumously in 1873 by his brother, Francisco José Pedro Lessa, under the name of Poesias Póstumas (in English: Posthumous Poetry).

A heavy drinker, Lessa died on February 21, 1861, because of a lesion in his heart, caused by his alcoholism.

Aureliano was the uncle of Pedro Augusto Carneiro Lessa.
