= Tobias Barreto =

Brazilian poet, philosopher, jurist and critic

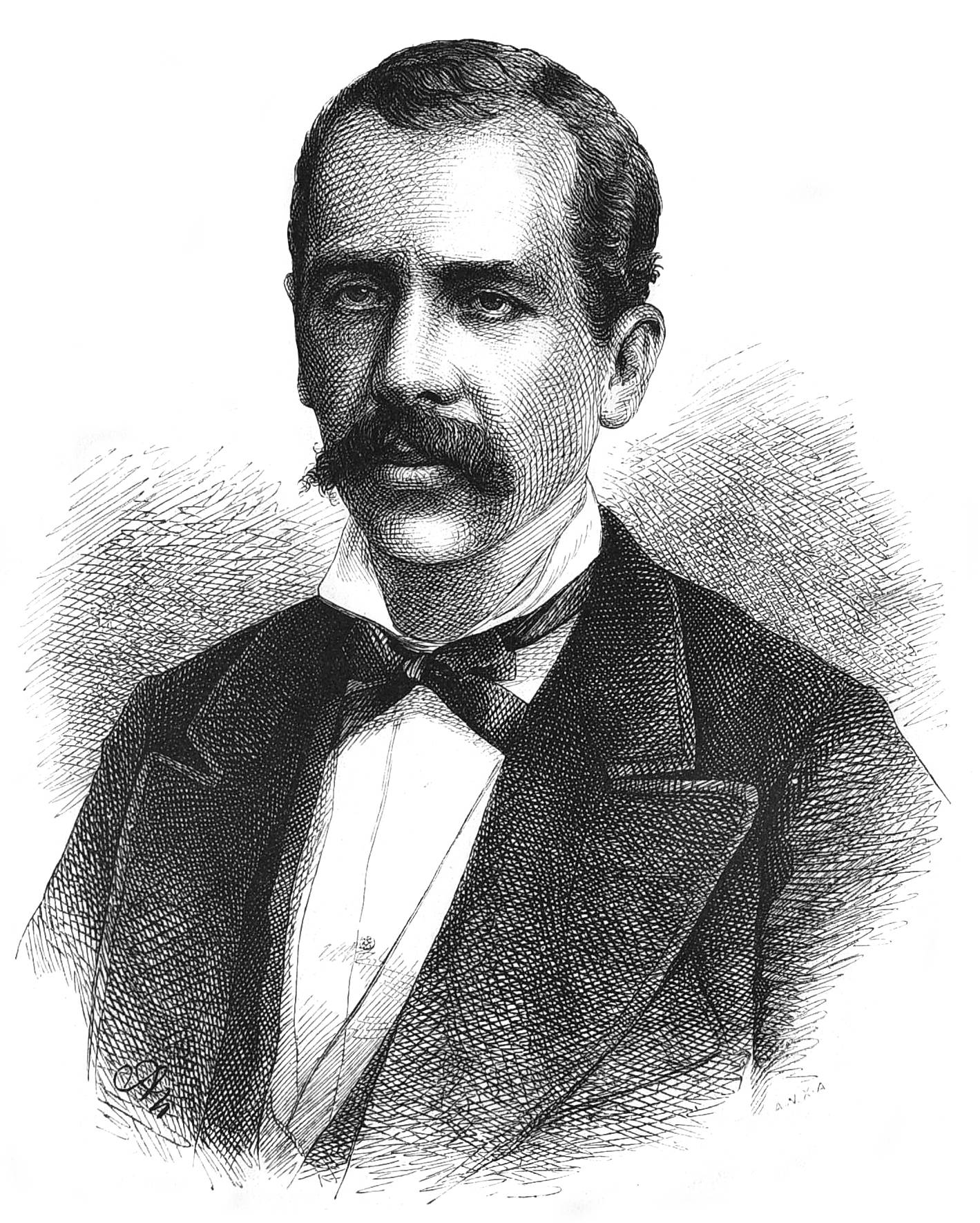
- Born: 7 June 1839; Vila de Campos do Rio Real, Sergipe, Empire of Brazil
- Died: 26 June 1889 (aged 50); Recife, Pernambuco, Empire of Brazil
- Education: Faculdade de Direito do Recife
- Occupations: Poet, philosopher, critic, jurist
- Writing career
- Subject: Social engagement
- Movement: Romanticism

Tobias Barreto de Meneses (7 June 1839 – 26 June 1889) was a Brazilian poet, philosopher, jurist and literary critic. He is famous for creating the "Condorism" and revolutionizing Brazilian Romanticism and poetry. He is the patron of the 38th chair of the Brazilian Academy of Letters.

== Life ==
Barreto was born in Vila de Campos do Rio Real (renamed "Tobias Barreto" in his honor in 1909), a town in the southern part of Sergipe. He learnt his first letters with Manuel Joaquim de Oliveira Campos, and he also studied Latin with priest Domingos Quirino. Barreto was so dedicated to the course that, in the future, he would become a Latin professor in Itabaiana.

In 1861, he left for Bahia in order to attend a seminary; however, having soon realized that it was not his vocation, he quit. Between 1864 and 1865, he became a private tutor in many subjects. He also tried to become a Latin (and later Philosophy) teacher at the Ginásio Pernambucano, but was not successful at the institution.

Barreto was an enthusiast of German culture, such an interest being induced by the reading of Ernst Haeckel and Ludwig Büchner. Following Haeckel, he was a noted early Darwinian in Brazil. For this reason, he established a German language-newspaper, Der Deutsche Kämpfer (German for The German Fighter). It was short-lived and had little influence.

Moving away to Escada, he married a colonel's daughter. He spent ten years there before returning to Recife. He died there in 1889 at a friend's house.

== Works ==
- Brasilien, wie es ist (German for Brazil as it is — 1876)
- Ensaio de Pré-História da Literatura Alemã (1879)
- Filosofia e Crítica (1879)
- Estudos Alemães (1879)
- Dias e Noites (1881)
- Menores e Loucos (1884)
- Discursos (1887)
- Polêmicas (1901; posthumous)

Preceded by New creation	Brazilian Academy of Letters - Patron of the 38th chair	Succeeded by Graça Aranha (founder)
