= Condorism =

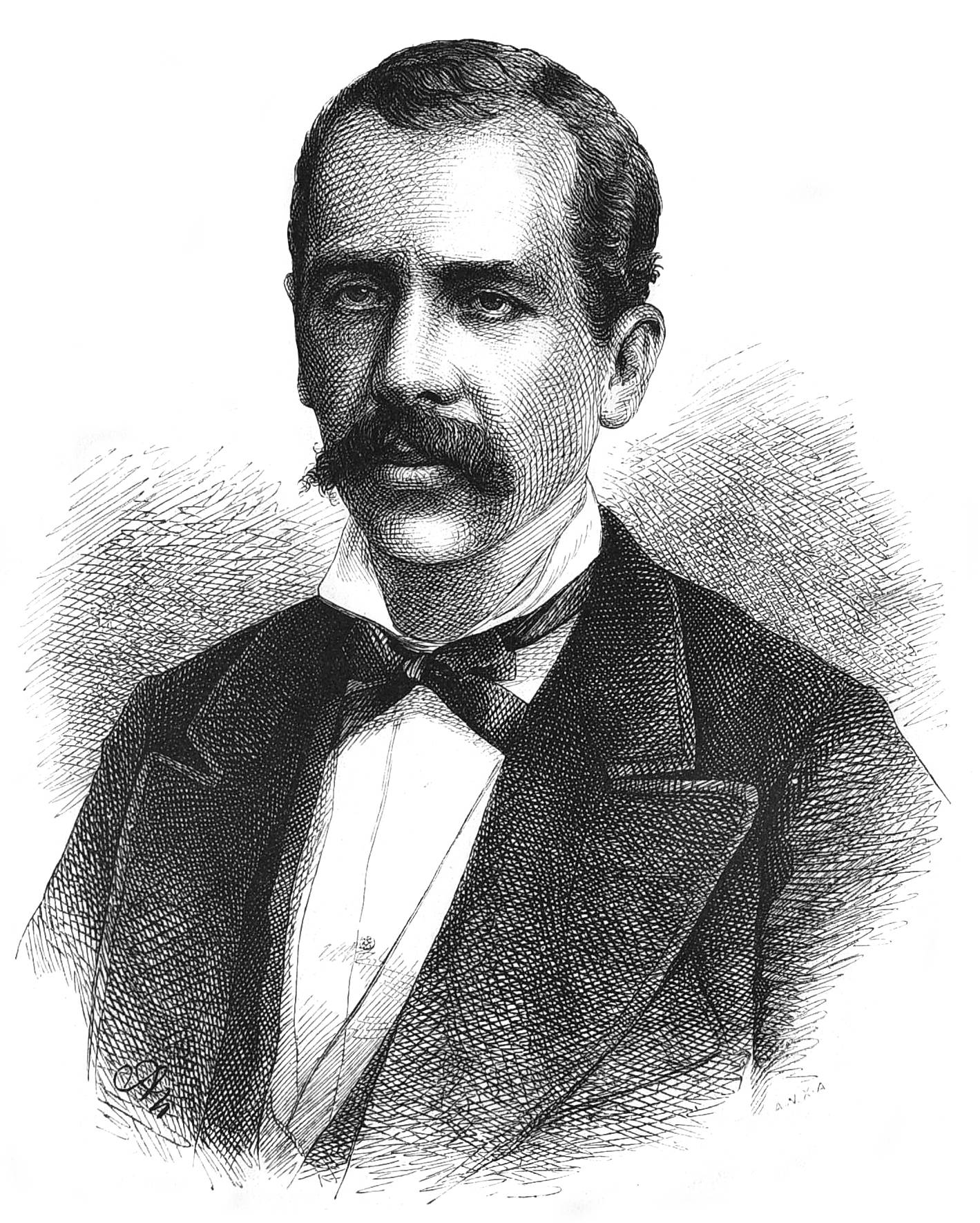
Tobias Barreto, creator of the Condorism

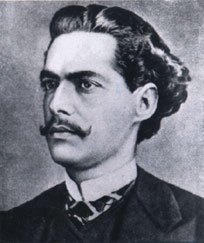
Castro Alves, "o Poeta dos Escravos" ("The Poet of the Slaves")

Condorism (in Portuguese: Condorismo or Condoreirismo) was a Brazilian literary movement that lasted from the mid-1860s until the early 1880s. It is a subdivision of Brazilian Romanticism, being thus called "the third phase of Brazilian Romanticism", preceded by the Indianism and the Ultra-Romanticism. Condorism was created by the poet Tobias Barreto, who was one of its most significant figures alongside Castro Alves and Pedro Luís Pereira de Sousa.

The name "Condorism" comes from the condor, a bird of solitary and high flight, said to be capable of seeing things from a great distance. Condorist poets believed they had this same ability, and should use it to educate people in the ways of justice and freedom.

Sometimes (albeit very rarely) Condorism is also called Hugoanism (in Portuguese: Hugoanismo), after Victor Hugo, who served as the major Condorist influence.

== Characteristics ==
Condorism changed Brazilian poetry in a variety of ways, being considered the Romantic phase that preceded the Realism in Brazil. Condorist poetry is characterized by a heavy use of hyperboles and grandiose language. Its main themes are Abolitionism and Republicanism, although the lyrical genre is also cultivated. However, unlike in the "Ultra-Romanticism", where love is heavily idealized and platonic, in Condorist poetry it is corporified, concrete, viable.

== Main adepts ==
- Tobias Barreto (1839–1889; creator of the Condorism)
- Castro Alves (1847–1871; the most famous Condorist poet, winning because of that the nickname O Poeta dos Escravos)
- Pedro Luís Pereira de Sousa (1839–1884)
- Joaquim de Sousa Andrade (1833–1902)
- José Bonifácio the Younger (1827–1886; in some poems)

== See also ==
- Espumas Flutuantes
- O Navio Negreiro
- Vozes d'África
- Victor Hugo
- Romanticism
- Abolitionism
- "The Black Vulture," an acclaimed 1910 sonnet (originally titled "The California Condor") by American poet George Sterling.
