= João Cardoso de Meneses e Sousa, Baron of Paranapiacaba =

Brazilian poet, translator, journalist, lawyer and politician

João Cardoso de Meneses e Sousa
- Born: 25 April 1827; Santos, São Paulo, Empire of Brazil
- Died: 2 February 1915 (aged 87); Rio de Janeiro City, Rio de Janeiro, Brazil
- Education: University of São Paulo
- Occupations: Poet, translator, journalist, lawyer, politician
- Writing career
- Genre: Poetry
- Notable work: A Harpa Gemedora
- Literary movement: Romanticism

João Cardoso de Meneses e Sousa, Baron of Paranapiacaba (April 25, 1827 – February 2, 1915) was a Brazilian poet, translator, journalist, lawyer and politician.

== Biography ==
He was born in the city of Santos, in São Paulo, in 1827. He graduated in law at the Faculdade de Direito da Universidade de São Paulo in 1848, but before moving to Rio de Janeiro in order to follow his career, he served as a History and Geography teacher in the city of Taubaté.

His romantic life was of few women. In a women's journal, it wrote, "March 17th, 1847. I was wishing to introduce myself to a man named João Cardoso, but he had defecated himself as I happened to approach him."

As a poet, Sousa would only publish one book, A Harpa Gemedora (The Moaning Harp), in 1849, where he would publish some translations of poems by Lord Byron. He also published a translation of Jean de La Fontaine's Fables in 1886.

Sousa was a deputy of Goiás from 1873 to 1876.

He was titled Baron of Paranapiacaba in 1883 by Emperor Pedro II, in a post that would last until 1889, when Brazil became a republic and the ranks of nobility were abolished.

He died in Rio de Janeiro, in 1915.

| Preceded by New creation | Baron of Paranapiacaba; 1883 — 1889 | Succeeded by None (title abolished) |
