= Castro Alves =

Brazilian poet and playwright (1847–1871)

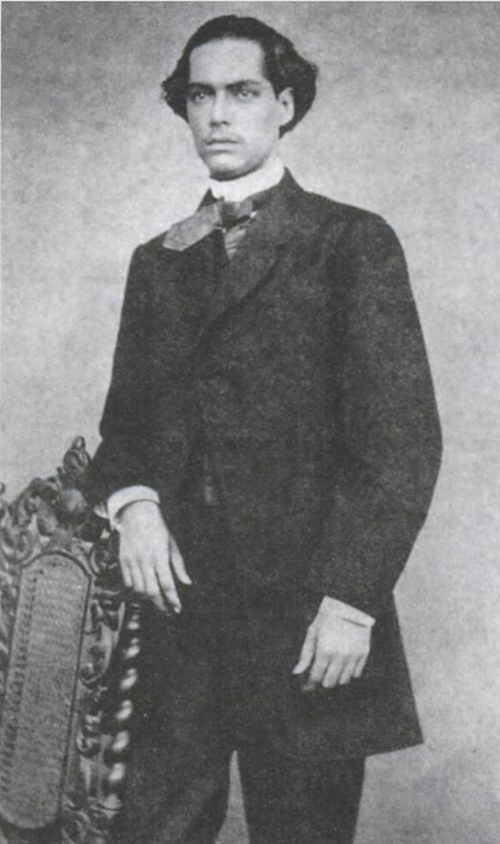
- Castro Alves, c. 1865
- Born: 14 March 1847; Curralinho, Bahia, Empire of Brazil
- Died: 6 July 1871 (aged 24); Salvador, Bahia, Empire of Brazil
- Education: Faculty of Law of São Paulo
- Occupations: Poet, playwright
- Partner: Eugênia Câmara
- Relatives: José Antônio da Silva Castro; Mário Cravo Júnior
- Writing career
- Genres: Poetry, theatre
- Subjects: Abolitionism, Republicanism, love
- Notable works: Espumas Flutuantes, Vozes d'África, O Navio Negreiro
- Movement: Romanticism

Signature
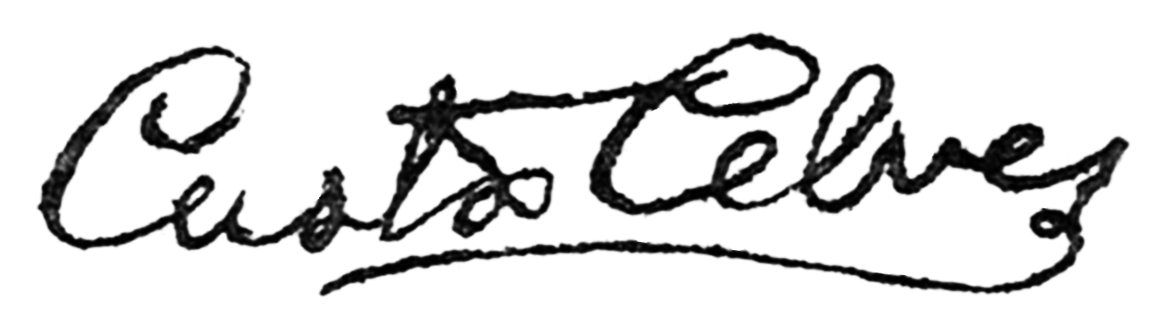

Antônio Frederico de Castro Alves (14 March 1847 – 6 July 1871) was a Brazilian poet and playwright famous for his abolitionist and republican poems. One of the most famous poets of the Condorist movement, he wrote classics such as Espumas Flutuantes and Hinos do Equador, which elevated him to the position of greatest among his contemporaries, as well as verses from poems such as "Os Escravos" and "A Cachoeira de Paulo Afonso", in addition to the play Gonzaga, which earned him epithets such as "O Poeta dos Escravos" (The Poet of the Slaves) and "republican poet" by Machado de Assis, or descriptions of being "a national poet, if not more, nationalist, social, human and humanitarian poet", in the words of Joaquim Nabuco, of being "the greatest Brazilian poet, lyric and epic", in the words of Afrânio Peixoto, or even of being the "walking apostle of Condorism" and "a volcanic talent, the most enraptured of all Brazilian poets", in the words of José Marques da Cruz. He was part of the romantic movement, being part of what scholars call the "third romantic generation" in Brazil.

Alves began his major production at the age of sixteen, beginning his verses for "Os Escravos" at seventeen (1865), with wide dissemination in the country, where they were published in newspapers and recited, helping to form the generation that would come to achieve the abolition of slavery in the country. Alongside Luís Gama, Nabuco, Ruy Barbosa and José do Patrocínio, he stood out in the abolitionist campaign, "in particular, the figure of the great poet from Bahia Castro Alves". José de Alencar said of him, when he was still alive, that "the powerful feeling of nationality throbs in his work, that soul that makes great poets, like great citizens". His greatest influences were the romantic writers Victor Hugo, Lord Byron, Lamartine, Alfred de Musset and Heinrich Heine.

Historian Armando Souto Maior said that the poet, "as Soares Amora points out 'on the one hand marks the arrival point of romantic poetry, on the other hand he already announces, in some poetic processes, in certain images, in political and social ideas, Realism'. Nevertheless, Alves must be considered the greatest Brazilian romantic poet; his social poetry against slavery galvanized the sensibilities of the time". Manuel Bandeira said that "the only and authentic condor in these bombastic Andes of Brazilian poetry was Castro Alves, a truly sublime child, whose glory is invigorated today by the social intention he put into his work".

In the words of Archimimo Ornelas, "we have Castro Alves, the revolutionary; Castro Alves, the abolitionist; Castro Alves, the republican; Castro Alves, the artist; Castro Alves, the landscaper of American nature; Castro Alves, the poet of youth; Castro Alves, universal poet; Castro Alves, the seer; Castro Alves, the national poet par excellence; finally, in all human manifestations we can find that revolutionary force that was Castro Alves" and, above all, "Castro Alves as the man who loved and was loved".

== Early life ==
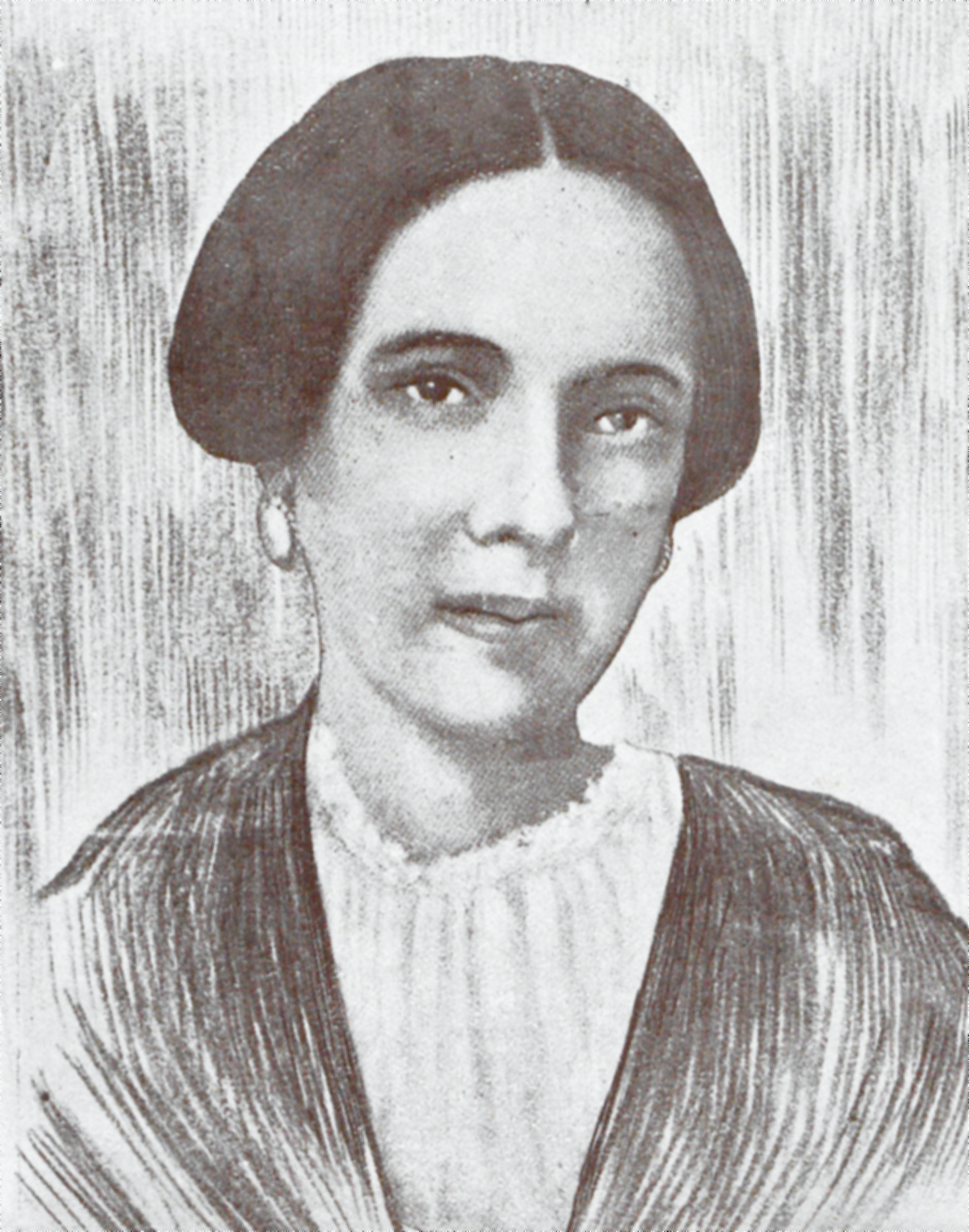
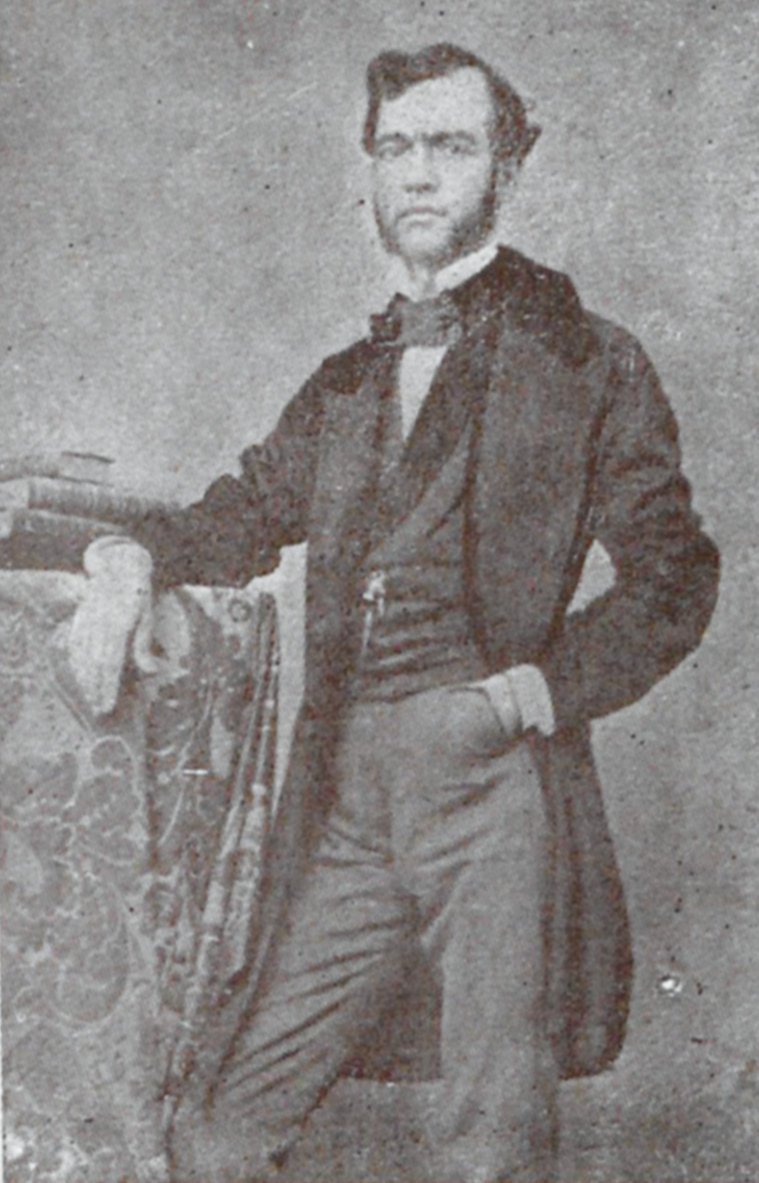
Castro Alves's parents: Clélia Brasília da Silva Castro and physician Antônio José Alves

The son of physician Antônio José Alves and Clélia Brasília da Silva Castro, Antônio Frederico de Castro Alves was born in the Cabaceiras farm, (Note: The Cabaceiras farm, today the city of Cabaceiras do Paraguaçu, was located seven leagues from the village of Curralinho (later renamed Castro Alves, and emancipated in 1895), and four leagues and a half from the parish of Muritiba (to whom it belonged for a brief period, from its emancipation until the emancipation of Curralinho), and was located in the then territory of Vila de Nossa Senhora do Rosário do Porto da Cachoeira (currently the municipality of Cachoeira), emphasizing in this case that "village" was already a municipality, according to the administrative division of the Brazilian Empire. Thus, several cities can claim to be the "land of Castro Alves". The city of Cabaceiras do Paraguaçu was established on the banks of the river, about half a league from the original farm; this port (originally called "Papa-Gente", in the place called "Tabuleiro de Pindoba"), then belonging to the city of São Félix, was given the name of the poet by Clementino Fraga, then a councilor of that city.) at ten o'clock in the morning, on Sunday, 14 March 1847. The poet had the family nickname of "Cecéu". (Note: In the original spelling of the time, "Cecéo". The Portuguese author Fernando Correia da Silva updated the spelling to "Secéu", and Archimimo Ornelas, in a book in line with the 1943 Orthographic Reform, spelled "Ceceu" (without the accent). This article keeps the original consonant, contrary to what Ricardo Stumpf did in his novel, where he spelled "Secéu". Afrânio Peixoto says that the version that such nickname would have originated from the fact that his older brother would have said, when he was little, that "he looks like a little angel from heaven" (anjinho do céu) is unfounded.) He spent his early childhood in Bahia's hinterlands, which made him "keep an indelible impression" for the rest of his life, in the words of Afrânio Peixoto.

He was cared for by the maid Leopoldina, who told him the stories and legends of the sertão, and her son Gregório would become Alves's page. He attended primary school in São Félix. Together with his older brother, he had his initial classes with a teacher and healer named José Peixoto da Silva, and Aristides Mílton remembers that he was a colleague of both in the city of Cachoeira in the class of the schoolmaster Antônio Frederico Loup.

He kept his first childhood love, Leonídia Fraga, from the period, in the words of Archimimo Ornelas: "he had met her as a child, in Curralinho, when they both played in the meadows". Ornelas attributes the poet's verses to this memory: "When childhood flowed happily, aimlessly (...) In my childhood yours was reflected / I kissed your soft, tiny hands. / You had a flutter of divine wings... / You were—the Angel of Faith! ..."; he would meet her again twice.

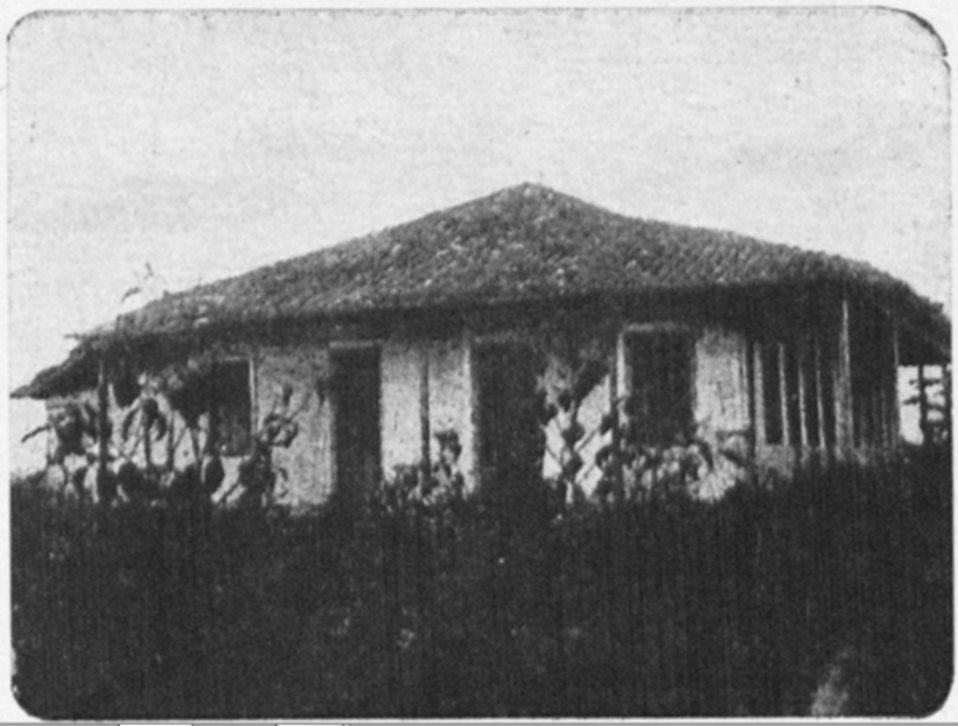
House where Castro Alves was born, on Cabaceiras Farm, owned by his grandfather

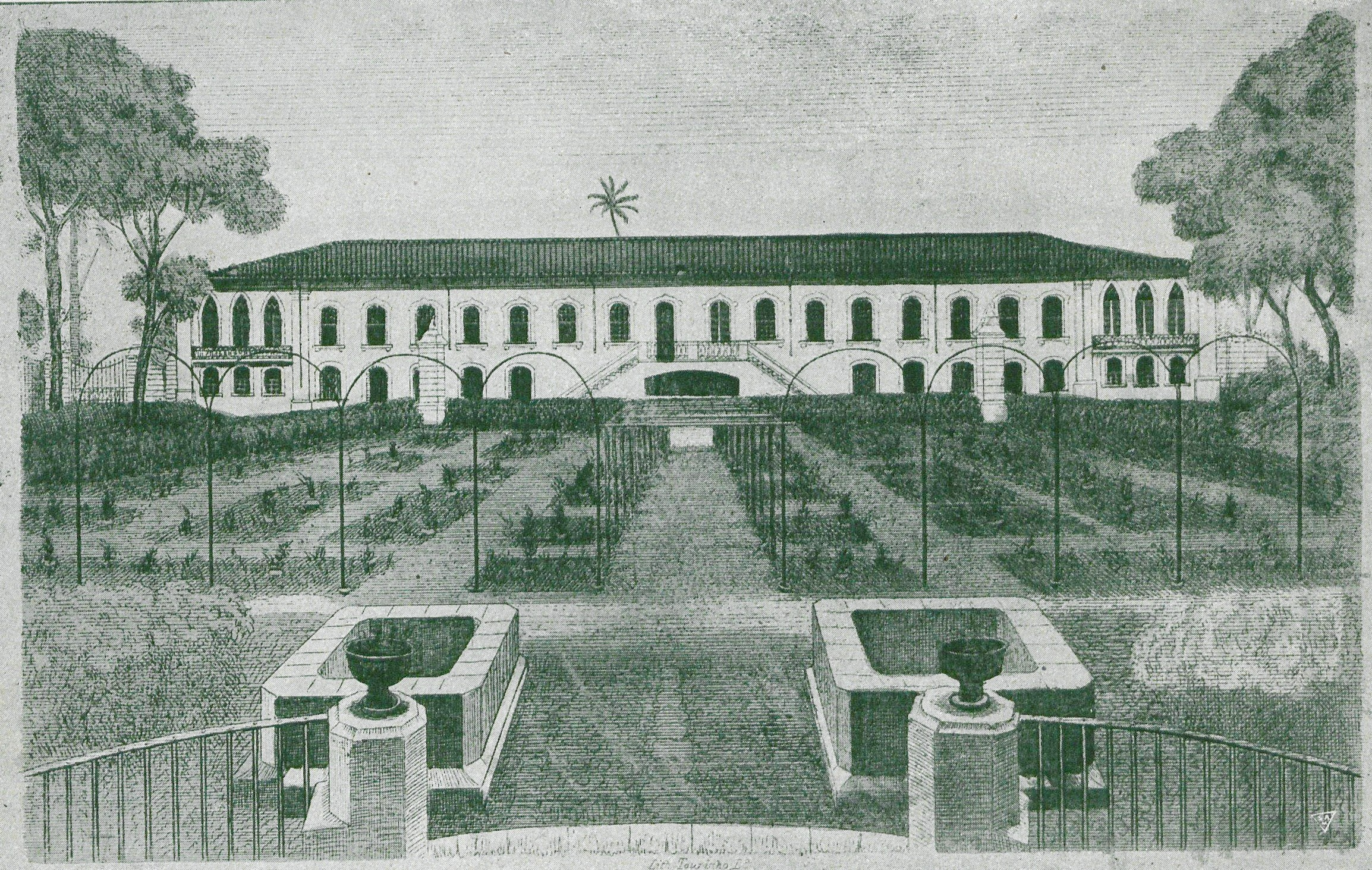
The Ginásio Baiano of the Baron of Macaúbas, where Castro Alves studied

In 1854, when the family moved to the province's capital, they initially went to live in a sobrado where Júlia Fetal, a victim of a crime of passion, had lived. Fetal was murdered by her fiancé in 1848 at the age of twenty. The boy Antônio Frederico had heard there stories of the ghosts that lived in the residence. Adelaide, who would become the poet's favorite sister, was born there. The residence was at Rua do Rosário, No. 1, but in the following year they moved again to Rua do Paço, No. 47. Castro Alves studied at Colégio Sebrão at this time. He remained at this school for two years.

In 1858, along with his brothers, Alves went to the Ginásio Baiano, owned by the famous educator Abílio César Borges, the Baron of Macaúbas. There, he found a fertile cultural environment, in Peixoto's record: "...a literary atmosphere, produced by the 'oiteiros', or soirées, then in fashion, art parties, music, poetry, recitation of verses and speeches, which would seduce him" and that this made him reveal his talent very early: "our poet revealed himself, perhaps before the age of thirteen, at that age for sure, from which the first preserved compositions date". In fact, the years 1859 to 1861 are the dates of his first verses. (Note: The "Ginásio Baiano" was founded in Salvador in 1858 by the future Baron of Macaúbas, Abílio César Borges; in 1871 Borges transferred it to Canon João Nepomuceno Rocha, who changed the name to "Colégio São José"; in 1876 a new change of ownership, acquired by João Florêncio Gomes, who gave it the final name of "Ginásio São José". It was, at its time, the oldest private school in the capital of Bahia. It was located in the Barris neighborhood.)

Desembargador Souza Pitanga, in a lecture given in Rio de Janeiro in 1918, remembering his colleague Plínio de Lima, recorded the atmosphere at Ginásio Baiano: "...this gentle and hospitable manor of beautiful letters, where a cheerful and vivacious legion of aspirants to future was going to receive the eucharistic bread of knowledge from the lips of a plethora of teaching priests". There, according to him, was "a shady grove of leafy mango trees, where cicadas sang in chorus" and "the late Director Dr. Abílio César Borges, dominating with his erect bearing and noble manners, a legion of minors who were made up of young men of 18 years old to even 7 years old children". Pitanga recalled that, among the professors, Ernesto Carneiro Ribeiro, Eduardo Frederico Alexander and Antônio Damásio stood out; among the contemporary students were Aristides Milton, Antônio Alves de Carvalhal, Odorico Mendes, Ruy Barbosa and the three Castro Alves brothers. (Note: The author is the desembargador Antônio Ferreira de Souza Pitanga.)

The death of Castro Alves's mother in 1859 was the beginning of the family's losses. Clélia Brasília was "victimized by lung weakness" and did not resist. Taken by violent commotion and revealing the beginning of emotional problems, his brother José Antônio then threatened to commit suicide, trying to throw himself out of a window.

In 1861, while still a student at Colégio Baiano, he published verses in several newspapers in honor of the "master of the heart", Antônio de Macedo Costa, who had died. The "poetic tribute" was composed of eight sextiles with seven syllables.

== Life in Recife ==
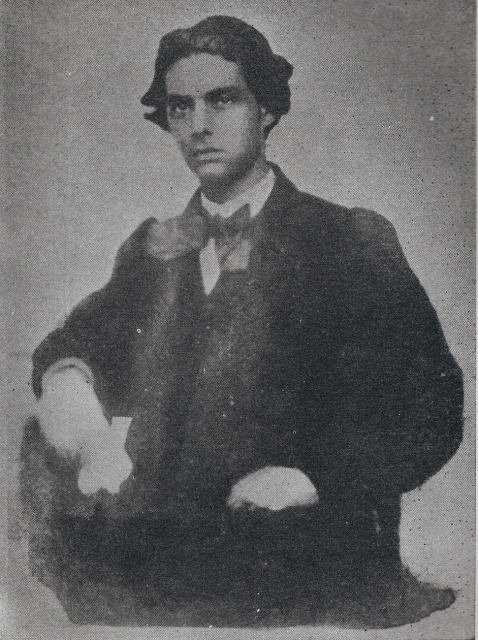
The young Castro Alves

On 25 January 1862, shortly after his father's marriage to Maria Ramos Guimarães, and at only fourteen years old, Castro Alves moved to the city of Recife with his older brother, in order to enroll in a preparatory course attached to the Faculty of Law of that capital, with the intention of joining it. He soon joined the social activities of the academic youth, as Afrânio Peixoto said: "Then the hectic and loose life of the academy, where talented young men struggled to appear, the generous nature of Castro Alves, who from an early age aspired to the glory that the great social causes give, made him a tribune and a poet who did not shy away from public sessions at the Faculty, in student societies, in theatre audiences, incited from the outset by the applause and ovations he had begun to receive, and went on in a crescendo of apotheosis".

As soon as he arrived in Recife, he lived with his brother in the Convent of São Francisco and from there they moved to a dormitory on Rua do Hospício, where his future brother-in-law and his great friend Augusto Álvares Guimarães, would later also live. Xavier Marques remembers the two brothers, then: José Antônio reading Álvares de Azevedo to the madmen in the asylum and he, Castro Alves, "playing billiards, drawing and writing verses". Luís Cornélio dos Santos, another great friend who would accompany him until his death, reported that they then went to live in a remote neighborhood of Recife, on the banks of the Capibaribe, where he often followed him on walks in which he read poems from a notebook that, later, got lost. Santos recorded about that period: "This boy's soul was of an unsurpassable purity; his intelligence had flashes that dazzled like lightning—Hugo as a child must have been like that" and about the lost notebook: "That little book was lost; not one of those stanzas figure today in the rich treasure of poems he bequeathed us".

About this period, Antônio Loureiro de Souza recorded: "He lives, and well lived, his time, agitated between love and poetry – the reason for his existence". In Recife, he became very close to his fellow countryman Plínio de Lima: "They wrote the same newspapers together and had the same literary orientation against the current led by Tobias Barreto". Afrânio Peixoto described his appearance: "At the time he was a handsome young man, with a slender build, pale complexion, large lively eyes, black and thick hair, a powerful and harmonious voice, irreproachably dressed in black, gifts and manners that impressed the crowd, imposing himself to the admiration of men and to women, inspiring the most tender feelings".

In May 1863, he gave an example of his precocity by publishing in Recife A Canção do Africano (in the first issue of the newspaper Primavera). Afrânio Peixoto said that in Recife, or perhaps before, he found his "vocation as an abolitionist" and concluded: "If 'there were no precursors', no one would be more precocious either": he was only sixteen years old. But in March he had taken the college entrance exam, failing in geometry: "he had always been interested in mathematics", in the words of Afrânio Peixoto, who, however, justified this failure with the fact that the Chambers closed at the time, thus making it impossible for him to receive the notice to carry out a conditional enrollment, as a listener. Not everything was lost from this period: the poems Pesadelo, Meu segredo and Cansaço were preserved, in addition to A Canção do Africano.

The Portuguese actress Eugênia Infante da Câmara had come to Brazil in 1858, starting a tour of the country with the Companhia Dramática Furtado Coelho, traveling from south to north. She was not considered a pretty woman, but she was endowed with "an extraordinary grace, intelligent, educated, nimbly nervous and vibrant, full of seductions and singular whims". The poet was just over fifteen years old when he saw her for the first time, presenting the play "Dalila" at the São João Theatre in Salvador, and then he fell in love with her. He would see her again in Recife years later as the main actress of the company. Afrânio Peixoto suggested that the beginning of the passion that would have so much influence in his life possibly dates from this time. (Note: Múcio Teixeira says that the poet's love for the actress began in 1862, when the latter was fifteen; the information is contradicted by Xavier Marques, who informs that neither Alves nor Câmara were in Bahia that year; Afrânio Peixoto then fixes the year 1866 when they effectively relate. Archimimo Ornelas, however, reports as seen in the text of this article that since 1864 the family was already concerned with Alves's passion for the actress.)

On 9 February 1864, his brother José Antônio, who had gone mad months before, committed suicide. (Note: Ornelas, however, points to another year: "Since the tragic disappearance of José Antônio,—he was our poet's older brother and had died insane at the age of 19, on 9 February 1865...") Faced with so many adversities, and due to lung problems, Castro Alves returned to Bahia. Thus he had several absences from college, whose enrollment he had finally managed to get, and failed his first year; suffering from tuberculosis would give him the verses entitled Mocidade e Morte (whose original title would be O Tísico), where he wrote:

"I feel in me the bubbling of the genius / I see beyond a radiant future" but "I have now for future—the earth / For glory—nothing, for love—the grave..."

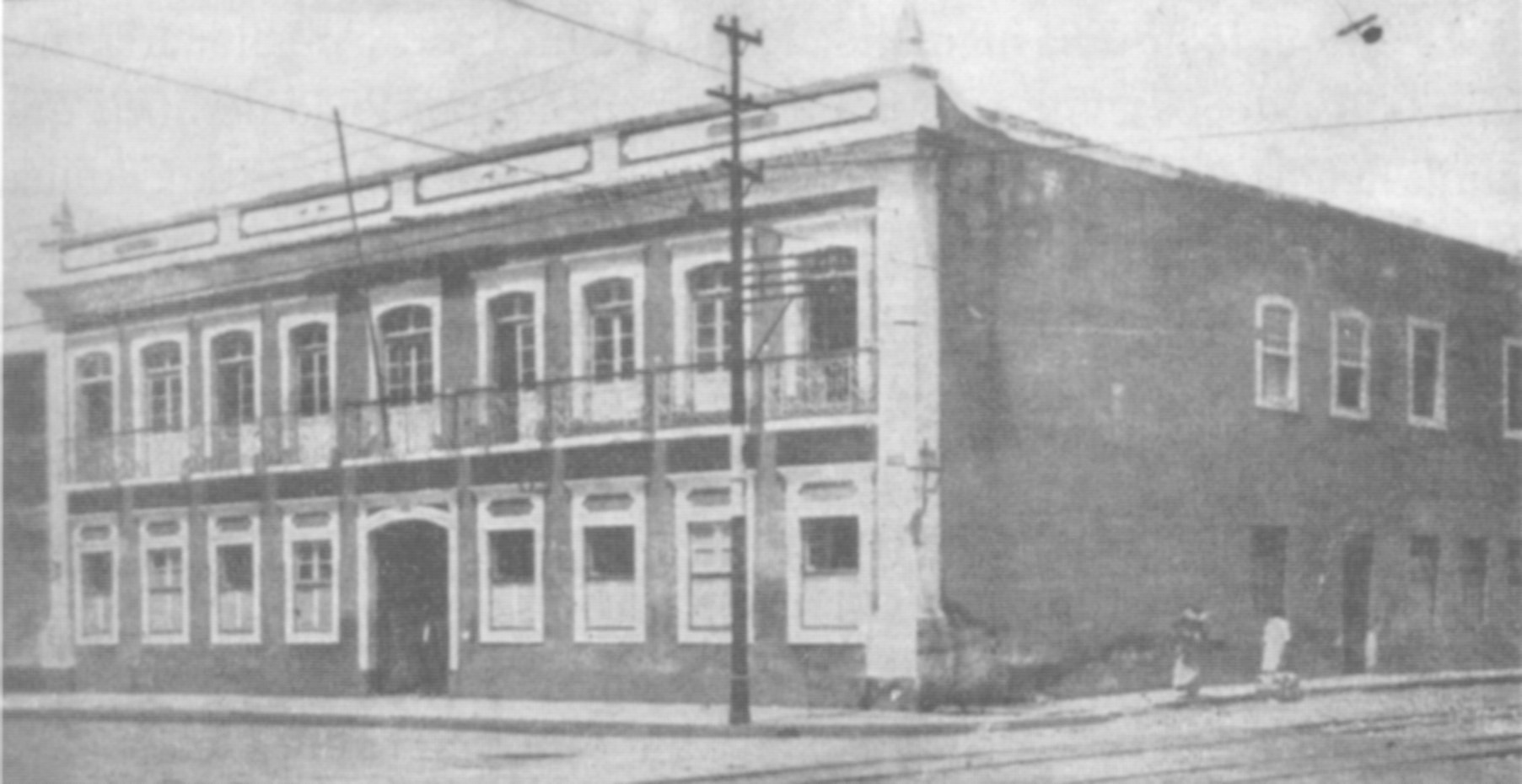
The old Faculty of Law of Recife

He only returned to Recife on 18 March 1865, accompanied by Fagundes Varella; on 10 August, he recited O Sábio at the Faculty of Law and enlisted on the 19th of that month in the Academic Battalion of Volunteers for the Paraguayan War, but failed the health exam. In the same year, he began composing Os Escravos, and met a girl a year older, Idalina. She was "the first woman who gave herself completely to the seductive power of Castro Alves", in the words of Ornelas, who reported that the young man met his lover in the Santo Amaro neighborhood, and with her went to live "in a little white house at Rua do Lima, under the curious eyes of the neighborhood", information partly contradicted by Regueira Costa, who reported a visit to his friend at the time: "I went to find him (...in the house in which he lived, obeying the natural influence of his temperament) living with his charming Idalina, preparing the poem for Os Escravos", who told her, then: "I'm very pleased with my neighbors, he told me, over there—the crazy ones [referring to Dr. Ramos's hospice] ...—on the right, the dead [alluding to the Public Cemetery] ...". Idalina was not completely ignorant like "the vast majority of these unfortunate women: uneducated and without sensitivity"; she could play the piano and sing, which denoted a wealthy background, and entertains him with her "alabastrine pale throat".

Castro Alves allowed himself such amorous "distractions", as well as dedication to poetry, due to the fact that he was repeating the classes of the previous year, which he had already studied; however, he was approved with reservations, perhaps because of the persecution of a Portuguese teacher who did not like him. Again in the company of Fagundes Varella, he returned to Bahia, on 16 December; with that there was a complete break with his lover, and perhaps he never saw Idalina again. Years later he wrote about this romance, the poem Aves de Arribação. That same year, he saw Leonídia Fraga again, his childhood love and who had been "promised" to him; if in the poetry that recalls his childhood he called her "Angel of Faith", in new verses he recalled the second meeting of the woman who, in the hinterlands, was always waiting for him:

"Then I saw you again… on the white front, / Radiated among the most frank pearls / The haughty crown that beauty braids! ... (…) For you I dreamed—triumphant—the palm. / Oh—Angel of Charity! ..."

His father, morally and physically shaken by the death of his eldest son José Antônio, who according to relatives and acquaintances would have more talent than his famous brother and in whom his father had great hopes, had even more fragile health, he could not resist the epidemic of beriberi that was raging in Salvador and died on 24 January 1866, leaving the poet and his surviving brothers as orphans; Castro Alves at a "dangerous age, in which directions are delineated, existences are guided". In Recife, two days after his loss, his landlord published an ad in the Diário de Pernambuco asking him for overdue rent: "As long as Mr. academic Antônio de Castro Alves does not pay 63 thousand réis of rent for the house where he lived on Rua dos Coelhos, he will see his name in this newspaper". Still in 1866, he fell in love with Ester and Simmy, two Jewish sisters, daughters of the merchant Isaac Amzalack, who lived close to the family home, in Sodré; Alves wrote the poem A Hebreia, which he sent to the two sisters with the dedication "to the most beautiful one", provoking a dispute between them. (Note: The Portuguese poet Tomás Ribeiro also fell in love with Ester Amzalack, cousin of the sisters, to whom he would dedicate the poem A Judia; Afrânio Peixoto says that the beauty of the mother of the "hebrew" sisters, the Italian Jew Grazzia Amzalack, made people stop when they saw her pass through the streets of the capital of Bahia.)

=== Master of improvisation and declamation ===
There was a perception among the romantic condorists, and not just in Castro Alves, that poetry could change the world and, for this, it needed to occupy public spaces in the dissemination of the ideals they defended (abolition, republic, democracy, etc.); none of them, however, reached its popularity and ability to give visibility to poetic art.

In Recife, Castro Alves stood out for his improvisations and for his demonstrations in the historical moments in which he convulsed public opinion; so in early 1866, on the same street where he lived, he joined Augusto Guimarães, Ruy Barbosa, Plínio de Lima, Regueira Costa and others in founding an abolitionist society. Despite having expressed an interest in enlisting, he was not sympathetic to the Paraguayan War—a sentiment that did not prevent him from paying patriotic homage to his friend Maciel Pinheiro, who had left for the theatre of war. In a popular demonstration in defense of the republic, which the police repressed, he uttered an improvisation where he said: "The square, the square belongs to the people / Like the sky belongs to the condor ..."; or even the improvised "À Mocidade Academica" during the Ambrósio Portugal case, (Note: In an incident against a deputy, he managed to arrest student leader Ambrósio Portugal, born in Ceará; The entire Faculty of Law of Recife rose up against the arbitrariness and rescued Portugal from the police, starting a violent wave of protests and repression, when Castro Alves performed his improvisation that, memorized by those present at the time, today integrates his work in the "Hinos do Equador" with the title "Improviso (À Mocidade Acadêmica)".) where he called to the young people, from a window on Rua do Imperador: "You, the stars of the country, rise up! / In the face of infamy, no one is bloodless (…) The law upholds the popular right, / We uphold the right standing!"; or, still, in Eugênia's defense during the clashes with Tobias Barreto that will be seen below: "To gravitate to you is to get up / To fall to the ground is to stand". Vicente Azevedo, a contemporary, recorded: "And he knew how to prepare the scene, as an emeritus that he was. For these occasions, he put rice flour on his face, in order to accentuate his paleness even more; a little carmine on his lips (oh! Adorable illusions of youth) and much oil in the hair which he casts from his fair head".

Years later, in São Paulo, Martim Francisco Terceira recorded the first time he saw Castro Alves declaim at the São José Tehatre in a show for the benefit of actor Joaquim Augusto Ribeiro de Souza, giving the real dimension not only of the poet's charisma, but also of the effect it provoked on the people: "A lot of people, no empty place. The curtain goes up. The artists line up on stage, with the beneficiary in the lead. All eyes turn to the last box of the 2nd order, to the left of the stage, where the handsome, well-proportioned, popular figure of the young man from Bahia appears. Black, wavy hair; wide, sonorous voice; confident enunciation, as if pausedly; gesture and word in unfailing harmony, dominating attention and heart, impatience and conscience of the ecstatic auditorium; astonishing success! Impossible to imagine a more perfect recitation. Applause, much applause. A complete triumph of the genius over the crowd, of poetry over prose, of the individual over collective feeling", and concluded: "It is seen, it is felt that the soul of academic youth is proud of its maximum factor, of its favorite idol".

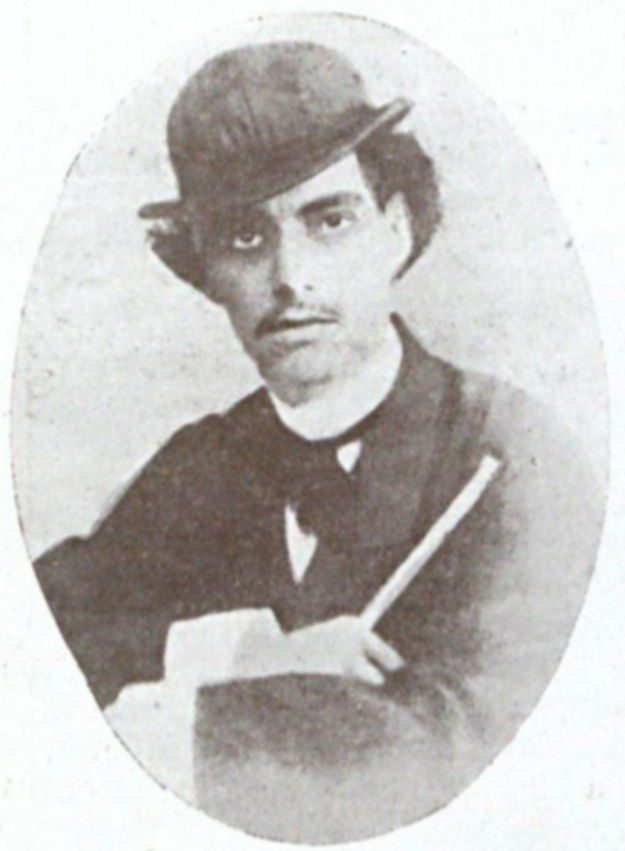
Castro Alves in Recife, photographed in 1866

=== Eugênia Câmara and Tobias Barreto ===
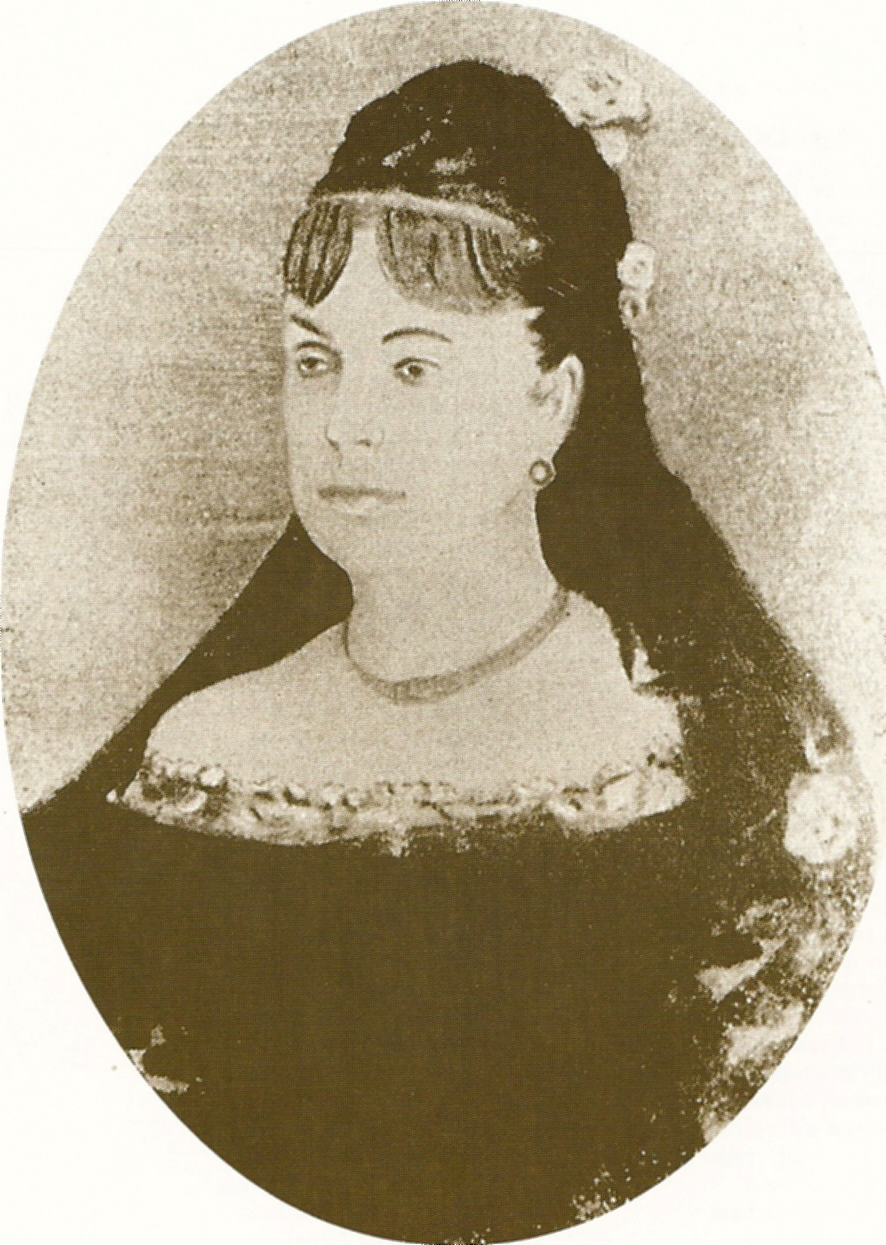
Eugênia Câmara

Since 1864, Castro Alves's family had found a photograph of Eugênia Câmara in his luggage, and began to worry about her; Afrânio Peixoto and Xavier Marques disagree, however, on the precise date of when the love began, although agreeing at the age of nineteen and when Castro Alves was already "the most beautiful man imaginable. Tall, strong, slender, with a slightly dark complexion, wide forehead, black eyes, slanted and lashed, straight nose, sensual lips and, on his powerful head, the black top, dark, lustrous, of a thick and long hair, whose seduction he knew" and already had a solid intellectual background that had given him great popularity after "shaking" the Faculty of Law when he recited "O Século". He starred in one of the most vibrant duels in Brazilian literary history against his colleague Tobias Barreto.

Castro Alves and Tobias Barreto were friends until then and considered the two greatest expressions of Recife's academy; but Barreto, ten years older, was seen as nervous, with an unsociable temperament—contrary to Castro Alves, who was seen with "a gentle nature that attracted those who knew him". The dispute between the two took place when Barreto fell in love with the actress Adelaide Amaral, from the same company as Eugênia Câmara, and started to defend her to the detriment of the latter. Thus, two parties were formed in the city in which each group defended its muses, about what Jorge Amado later remarked: "As if from then on the plays, dramas and tragedies do not end when the curtain falls. The performance continues in the audience, through the two parties and the two leaders. Insults, applause and boos, verses and rants, are the complement of the theatrical spectacles of that time". (Note: Despite the enmity, professor Marques da Cruz says that Castro Alves was "a disciple and friend of Tobias Barreto" in his História da Literatura.)

After a night in which Tobias and his allies booed Eugênia, Castro Alves improvised in an overwhelming way in the reply and, days later, in a new confrontation, a new victory over his rival with "verses that were memorable", where Alves alluded to the fact that Adelaide was married and therefore unfaithful: "I'm a Hebrew, I don't kiss the plants / of Potiphar's wife…", leading the dispute to the pages of the press and to a resounding defeat for Barreto. Castro Alves thus conquered his mistress and the public and, having already lost his father, he also lost "the modesty of his amorous whims".

Such was his passion and insistence that Eugênia Câmara had nothing to do but give in to his harassment. She then lived with the wealthy bookkeeper Verissimo Chaves, who paid for her luxuries. With one lover abandoned for another, she did not follow the Company when it left on its tour to Bahia, and together with then young Castro Alves went to live in a small house on Rua do Barro, on the way to Jaboatão. Castro Alves thus missed his vacation and composed the play Gonzaga there, translated works and even started writing a novel (which was lost). They stayed in the city until May 1867, when they both left for Salvador.

=== Passage through Bahia ===
In Salvador, the couple stayed at the Hotel Figueiredo, in the city's center, in response to Castro Alves's desire that they be noticed, an affront to Bahia's society; but soon the actress, with love fading, expressed her desire to return to the stage and the two transferred to Quinta da Boa Vista, where the hospital of Dr. Alves was located and where the family lived for a few years (at that time the house was abandoned, after the death of Castro Alves's father). Eugênia began to perform in a company that operated at the São João Theatre: there she debuted on 20 June 1867, and both she and the poet were applauded for the verses they recited, repeating the success of Recife there.

On 7 September, the play Gonzaga premiered, with Eugênia in the lead role, and the success achieved was so great that the actress received a silver crown for her merits. Afrânio Peixoto described that moment in 1917: "Finally, on 7 September, Gonzaga takes the stage, with Eugênia in the role of Maria, a memorable literary festival that definitively consecrated Castro Alves, crowned in an open scene, in the delirium of the crowd that carried him in its arms to a feast and then to his house, always amid ovations". Their popularity increased, but the ardor that had united them in Pernambuco, especially on the part of the actress, diminished: in Castro Alves, jealousy grew, which was the reason for fights and violent scenes; Eugênia wanted to travel to Rio de Janeiro and Castro Alves decided to transfer to São Paulo, where some friends were already active at the Law College and where Eugênia would be unfaithful to him.

== In Rio de Janeiro and São Paulo ==
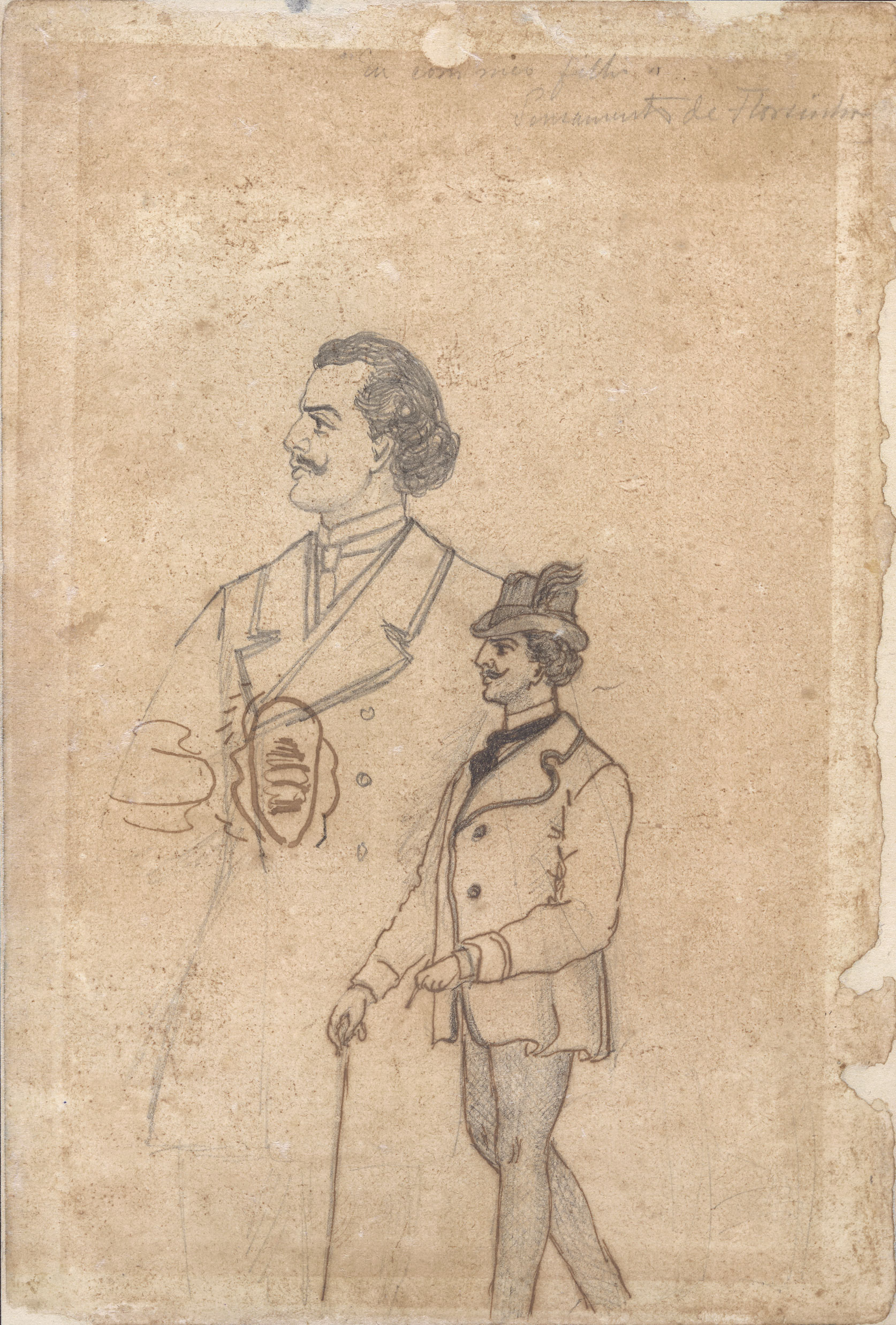
Castro Alves's self-portrait

On 10 February 1868, Castro Alves embarked with Eugênia for Rio de Janeiro, aboard the steamer Picardie, (Note: The vessel was part of the French company Société Générale du Transport Maritime which, being founded in 1865, already in 1867 received a concession from the Brazilian government to operate the transport of cargo and passengers in the country; thus, to carry out this service, it acquired, in addition to Picardie, the ships Bourgogne, Poitou and Savoie, all built in Britain and second hand.) for a brief stop before heading to São Paulo. In Rio, carrying a recommendation letter from Fernandes da Cunha, Alves introduced himself to the renowned writer José de Alencar, to whom he read the sketches of "A Cascata de Paulo Afonso" (provisional title of the poem). This meeting resulted in the article "Um Poeta" by Alencar, published on 22 February in the newspaper Correio Mercantil. Alencar also presented Castro Alves to Machado de Assis with a letter of recommendation in which he indicated the "Poet of Slaves" with the following words: "Be the Virgil of young Dante, lead him along the pathless paths where one goes to disappointment, indifference and finally glory, which are the three maximum circles of the divine comedy of talent". (Note: José de Alencar alluded to Dante Alighieri's Divine Comedy.)

During Castro Alves's stay in Rio de Janeiro, the Empire of Brazil achieved a victory in the Paraguayan War with the successful Passage of Humaitá. (Note: There was great hope that this victory would lead to the end of the war; However, this did not happen: the conflict lasted two more years.) A large crowd rushed to the streets, celebrating the achievement, and Castro Alves went out onto the balcony of the Diário do Rio de Janeiro newspaper (at Rua do Ouvidor, No. 97), where he recited "one of his rare warrior poems, verses of circumstance, applauded by the crowd, praised by the press" in Peixoto's words, but that Alves himself would later write in the manuscript in which he recorded the poem: "do not publish it" (a recommendation not followed by the editors of his work). (Note: This poem, under the title "Pesadelo de Humaitá", is part of "Hinos do Equador", and was published with praise for the verses "that aroused so much enthusiasm in the people" by Diário do Rio de Janeiro in its edition No. 63 of 5 March 1868; it was republished in 1913 in Salvador in the work "Poesias". The 1913 version has discrepancies with the manuscript left by Castro Alves and maintained by his family, and which was the form adopted by Afrânio Peixoto in his "Obras Completas".) It was also in one of the halls of this newspaper that he had scenes from Gonzaga, his play, presented to a small audience of intellectuals, which the newspaper would later announce had been "laureated by Mr. Castro Alves". Such successes filled him with pride, despite pretending to be humble; in March he went with Eugênia to the capital of São Paulo, where he gained admiration from the youth, and the jealousy of figures such as Joaquim Nabuco.

In São Paulo, Castro Alves participated in the América Lodge of Freemasonry, of which Ruy Barbosa was an active member, who, in it, issued a decree forcing its members to immediately release the slaves that belonged to them. The São Paulo lodge was already a prominent institution on the political scene, and the participation of young students from the Faculty of Law of São Paulo followed their participation in the "Ateneu", its student body, in which Alves had been a member of the "literature commission", of which Joaquim Nabuco was also a member. In academic times Ruy Barbosa and Castro Alves were also part of the Bucha Paulista, a secret legal society originally created based on the German Burschenschaft, intended to support students in precarious situations but which, in São Paulo, gained a social nature that transcended the academic environment and came to rise to power in the country through mutual support, to the point that three of the five participants in the commission that prepared the draft of Brazil's 1891 Constitution were members of the Bucha.

In São Paulo, Alves also attended the third year of college where, although without great dedication to study, he managed to pass. The situation with Eugênia continued in the midst of crises marked by fights, separations and reconciliations; she continued to perform with her play Gonzaga. The success that the city had offered him, according to Archimimo Ornelas, made him "neglect Eugênia" and she, "to take revenge, would look for other lovers", which Alves pretended to ignore because Eugênia still was constant to him. In October she still acted in the play and there was a "truce" which, however, gave way to new and strong fights due to the rumors about her unfaithful conduct, culminating in the definitive separation: "the final episode was one of unexpected violence. The actress pointed to the door…"

=== Hunting accident and foot amputation ===
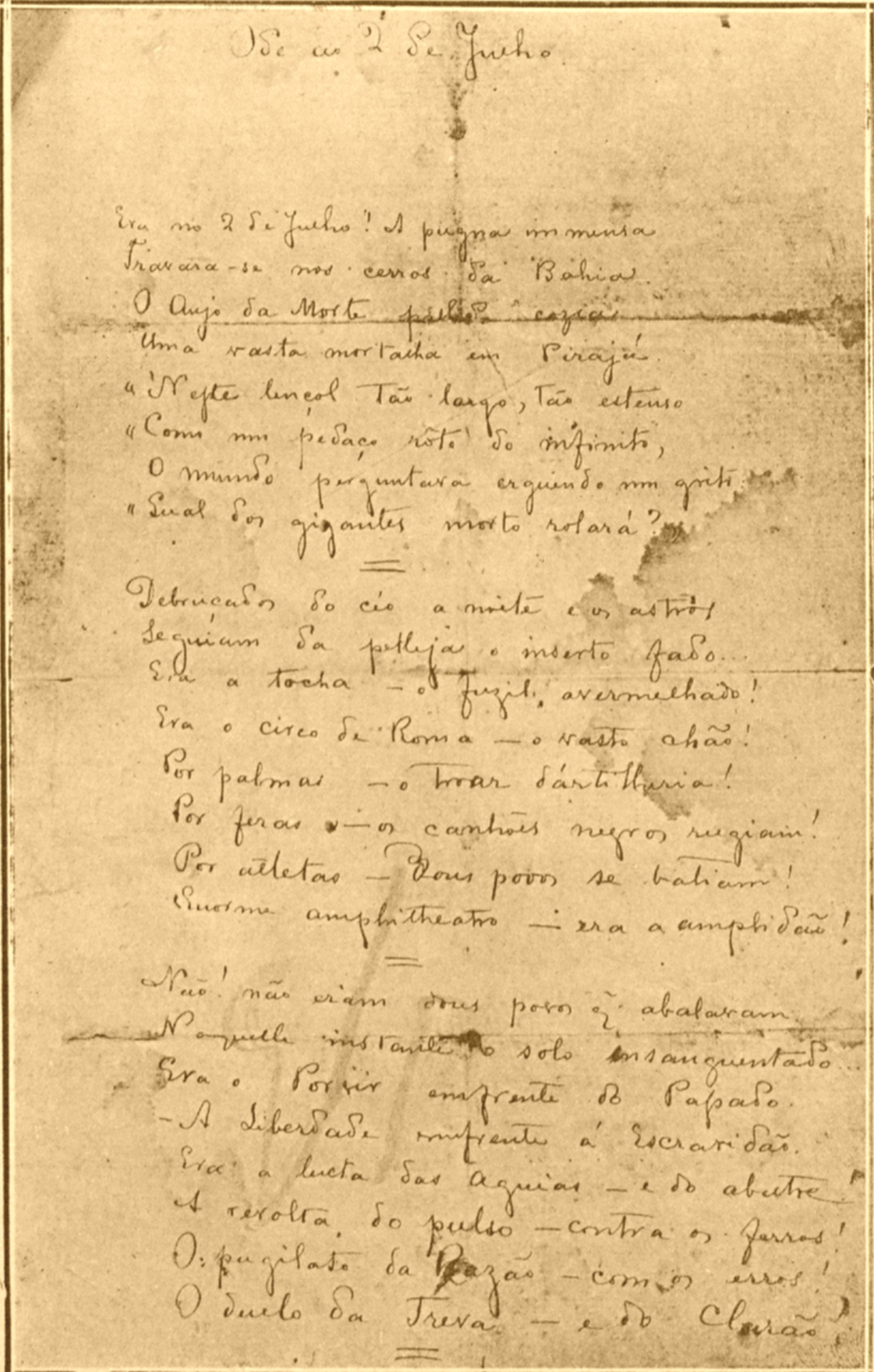
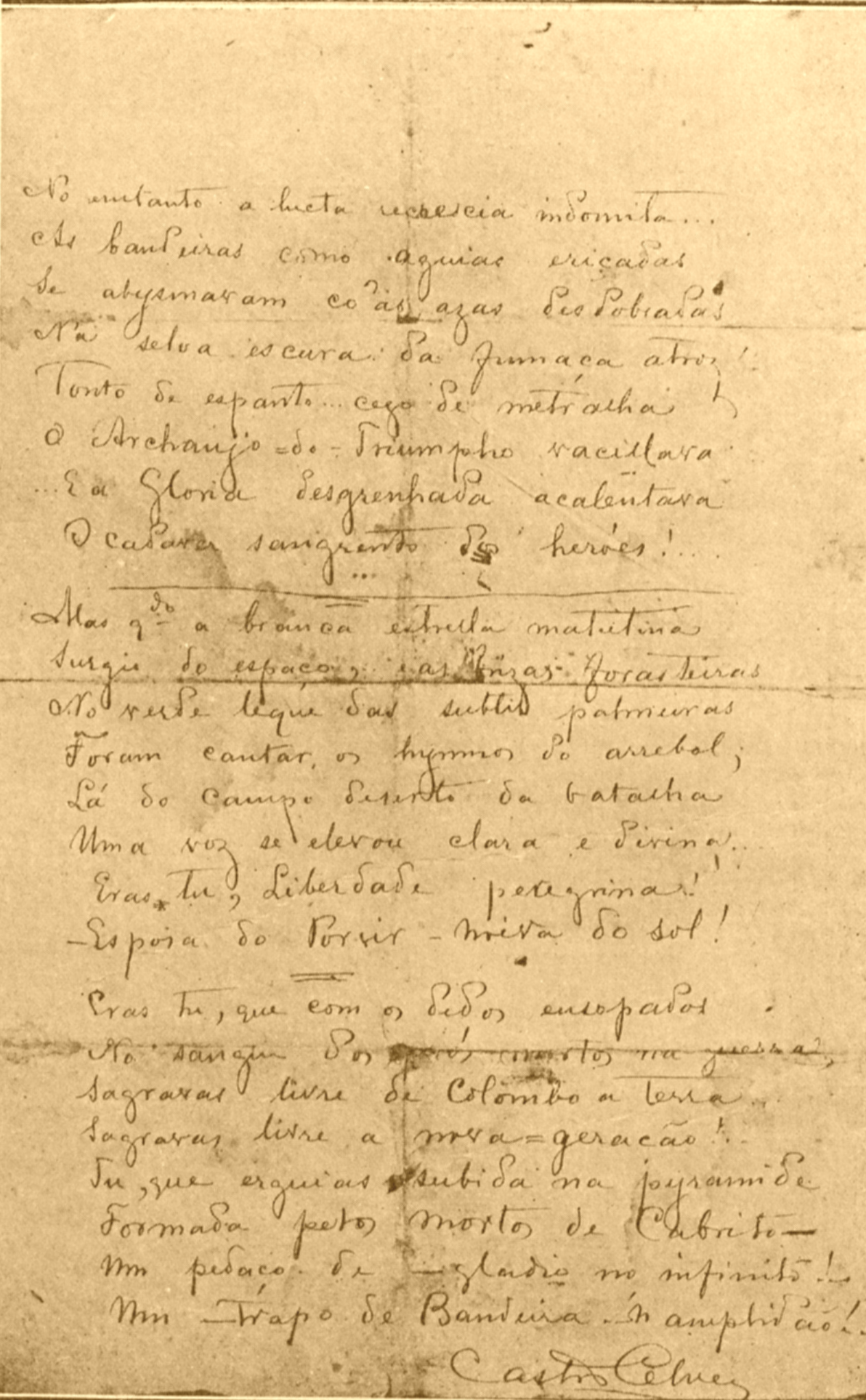
The poet's signature in Ode ao 2 de Julho, recited in São Paulo

Faced with the emotional exhaustion caused by the constant call to public presentations and the passionate drama with Eugênia, the poet became the victim of "profound depression" and sought moments of solitude. "I didn't read, I didn't write; I walked around, smoked, went hunting, without even firing a shot", said Afrânio Peixoto.

On 1 November 1868, (Note: This date is indicated by Afrânio Peixoto, based on the account of the poet's friend, Brasílio Machado; Múcio Teixeira says that the accident happened in 1869; others, however, say it was on 11 November, and not on the 1st.) according to Peixoto, recalling the worsening of Castro Alves's tuberculosis: "he had gone to spend a day on the outskirts of Brás, and in the afternoon of that day he had taken his shotgun and gone out into the countryside. When crossing a ditch, (Note: Múcio Teixeira says it was a creek.) with the jump, the gun turned downwards fired and the lead load hit Alves's left foot. He was able to drag himself to the house of his friend and correspondent, the doctor from Bahia, Lopes dos Anjos, [who] then took him to the town house, on Rua do Imperador, next to the current No. 33. In addition to this doctor and friend, the surgeon Cândido Borges Monteiro, the Baron of Itaúna and president of the province, also helped him. But the wound worsened, with no hope of cure, and the old pulmonary ailments woke up, impressive".

During that period, his friend Luís Cornélio, who lived in the Court, called him there, where the medical resources were better. On 19 March 1869, he finally embarked in Santos, accompanied by a friend. To those who he had not been able to say goodbye in person, he did so through a note published in the newspaper Ypiranga that had previously announced his departure and, on the 30th, he published a moving letter of thanks to his friends in the city of São Paulo in the Correio Paulistano.

Castro Alves arrived in Rio de Janeiro on 21 March; there he underwent an amputation, in which surgeons and professors from the Faculty of Medicine of Rio de Janeiro, Andrade Pertence and Mateus de Andrade, acted: they cut off his lower left limb without any anesthesia. The pulmonary situation, aggravated by several haemoptysis, made the use of chloroform (then the only anesthetic means) impossible: he had only a handkerchief to bite on in order to mitigate the pain. Peixoto narrated that he said, disguising the pain with humor: "Cut it, cut it, doctor... I will be left with less matter than the rest of humanity".

The surgery, performed in the first days of June, was reported by the São Paulo newspaper Ypiranga on 21 July; the long convalescence began in which the poet, now wearing a wooden prosthesis, imagined reaching a "new spring". During the period when he stayed with Luís Cornélio and his wife, his house became the "Petit Salon", frequented by young artists and intellectuals, and he had brief passions like those of Cândida and Laura, who he recalled in the poem "Os Anjos da Meia-Noite" (The Midnight Angels). (Note: About this August 1870 poem, divided into sonnets (the poetic form he preferred for love verses), Afrânio Peixoto said that such "angels" who visited him like "shadows" were: "Marieta", Leonídia Fraga; "Bárbora", a "hetaira" - the same as a prostitute - that he had known; "Esther" retains the name, Ester Amzalack; "Fabiola" is Eugênia Câmara; "Cândida and Laura" were Cândida Campos and Maria Cândida Garcez, whom he had met when he was recovering from the amputation at his friend Luís Cornélio's house the previous year; "Dulce" was Eulália Filgueiras, his host's sister; the "last ghost", said the poet himself: "You are glory perhaps! Perhaps death!...")

But he was still moved by the love he ended with Eugênia Câmara and, on 17 November, he wrote the verses of "Adeus" to the actress: "Goodbye! Forever goodbye! The voice of the winds / Calls me beating against the rocks, / I'm leaving ... soon the ocean / Will throw millions of waves between us ..."; She wrote a reply to this poem, published in 1910 by Xavier Marques: "Goodbye, brother of this soul, I say goodbye to you! / But let me avoid that never!—/ May heaven be compassionate to my prayers / And one day yours and my woes will cease!" and "Yes, God illuminated your forehead / With a divine ray of genius! And glory!. .../ Live, dream, sing, this horizon! ... / Brazil wants your name in its history" and concludes "Goodbye! If one day fate / Makes us meet / As a sister or as a lover / Always! Always! You will find me". After staying with his family, together with friends, Castro Alves embarked for Bahia on 25 November 1869; when sailing the Guanabara Bay, he had the idea for the title of the book he planned to publish there: Espumas Flutuantes (Floating Foams).

== Return to Bahia ==
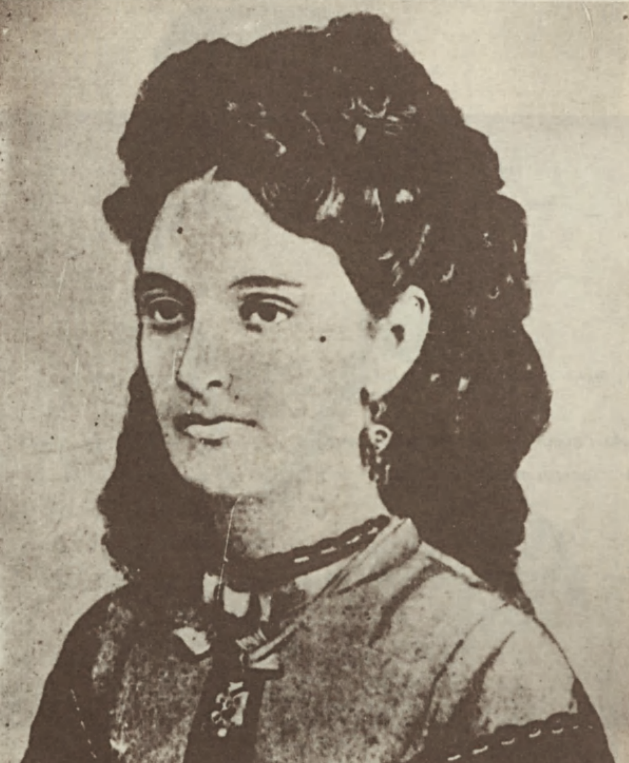
Ester Amzalack, one of the "Hebrew" sisters courted by the poet

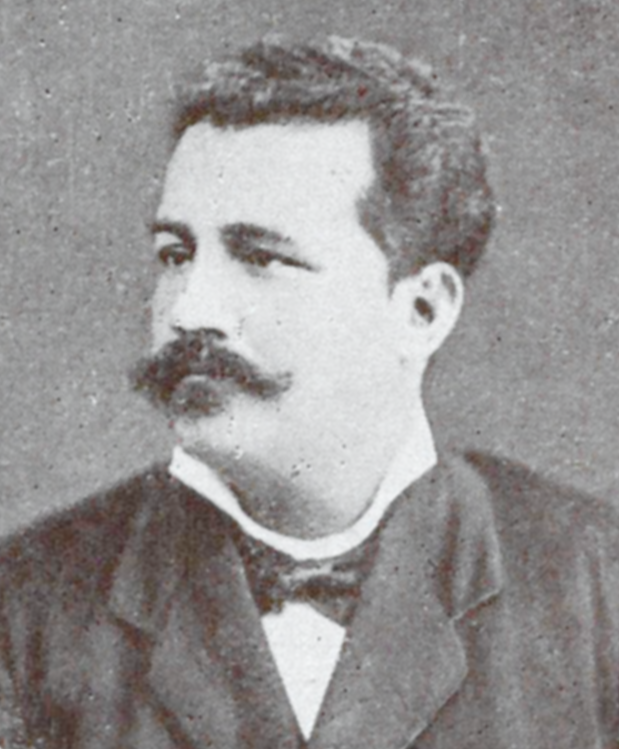
Augusto Guimarães, brother-in-law and great friend of Castro Alves

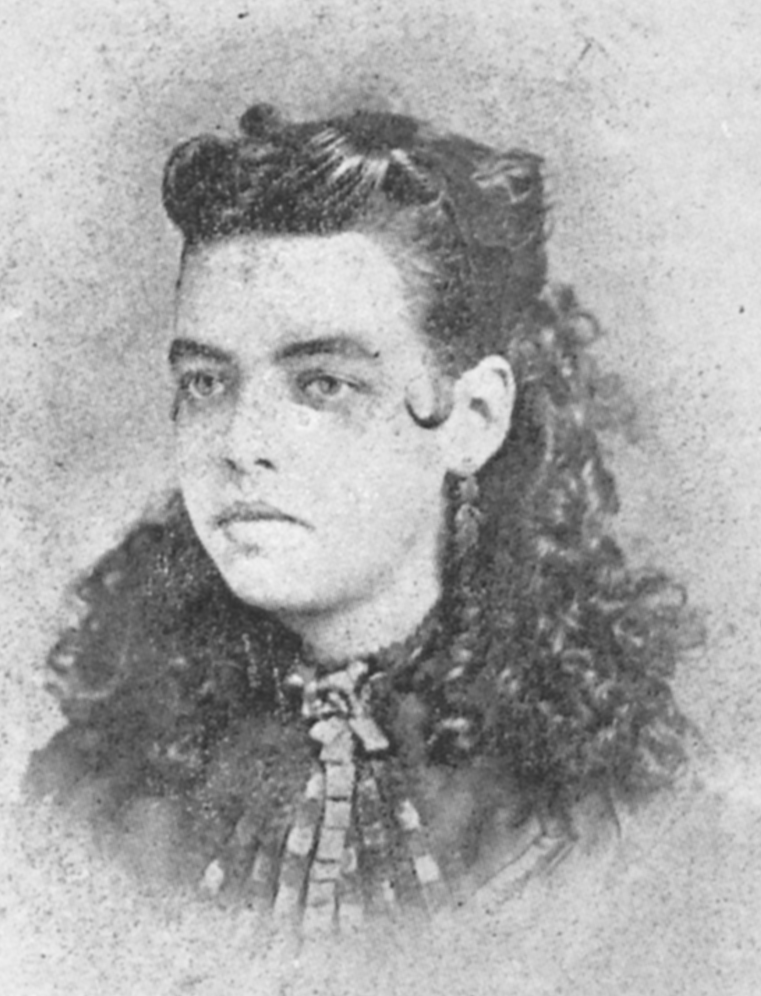
Adelaide, his favorite sister, whom he called "Sinhá"

Castro Alves's arrival in Salvador, in an account transcribed by Archimimo Ornelas, translated his physical and moral decay: "It was a moving scene when he entered his father's house, being received by his stepmother and the young sisters who adored him. He left strong, erect, full of confidence and audacity, he returned bloodless, crippled, sick in the chest, with a soul saturated with bitterness". Surrounded by family love and friends, he found the Jewish women who had inspired him one day, and Esther was now engaged. He pretended to be devastated by this and, through the window of the house, when he saw them pass, he pretended to stab himself in the chest with a paper dagger, to which they, finding it funny, made a sign to him not to lose hope.

On 29 January, he left for Bahia's hinterlands one last time, on a boat trip that "split the waves of the Paraguaçu in search of the deep solitude of the deserts, to feed, like Saul, the despair of my spirit, and revive this blood exhausted and impoverished by sadness and suffering", as he recorded in a letter to Luiz Cornélio; He then left, together with his brother-in-law Augusto, for Curralinho, where, according to Archimimo Ornelas, he found himself influenced by the death of Allan Kardec, which occurred at the end of the previous year and which had had great repercussions in those days, and produced verses in which he questioned life after death. (Note: About this possible influence of Kardec, his colleague and friend from high school and also an abolitionist, Aristides Spínola, would become one of the main names in the history of the Brazilian Spiritist Federation, which he presided.)

Fernando Correia da Silva recorded that, "on the Santa Isabel do Orobó farm, (Note: The information is contradicted by Archimimo Ornelas, according to whom the poet had moved to the Santa Isabel farm in August 1870, after seeing Leonídia again.) Castro Alves reunited with Leonídia Fraga, his boyhood fiancée and today the graceful maiden who had always waited for him. Rekindle the first passion? Why, if death is around?" Castro Alves recorded in verses: "Today is the third milestone in this history. / Calcinated by the lightning of glory, / I described love, mocked eternity... (...) softness of the lilies… / Angel of charity…" About those days he wrote: "Perhaps you have servants and lovers beyond, / A palace instead of a hut. / And here you only have a guitar and a kiss, / And the burning fire of ideal desire / In the virgin breasts of the unfortunate mountain woman!"—and Correia da Silva concluded: "Leonídia, the 'unhappy mountain woman', will be waiting for you forever. She will end up going crazy". Ornelas said that "Leonídia was not reciprocated as she deserved" and she "undoubtedly loved the poet" and, despite having married later, when she went crazy in her crises, her memory returned, as Afrânio Peixoto recorded: "Divine love, who survived two deaths, of the beloved heart and of the loving reason".

From the hinterlands, he sent his future brother-in-law Álvaro Guimarães the manuscripts of the poems that were to be included in the publication of Os Escravos; the latter asked Guimarães to limit the number of poems, and said that he would remove the extensive translation he had made of Victor Hugo from there, as well as having sent copies for analysis by his friends Amâncio and Plínio de Lima, in Recife. On 14 October 1870, weakened by tuberculosis, Castro Alves asked his friend José Joaquim da Palma to "lend him his voice" to recite the verses of Deusa Incruenta - A Imprensa as Antithesis to 'Terribilis Dea' verses by Pedro Luís, a libel against the war; he recited it the next day at the São João Theatre, receiving a standing ovation from the audience. In November 1870, Espumas Flutuantes was finally launched. In its opening was the dedication to his dead family members: "To the memory of my father, my mother and my brother".

In Salvador, his sister Adelaide introduced him to Agnese Trinci Murri, an Italian woman who had settled in the capital and came to be a lyrical singer living with her mother, giving piano and singing lessons; (Note: The authors differ on her condition: for Xavier Marques, repeated by Múcio Teixeira, she was "widow and young"; Pedro Calmon says she was abandoned in Salvador by her husband, the artist Murri.) her beauty enchanted Castro Alves, and she did not give in to his verses; she wrote him a twelve-page letter; at Sodré's house he tried to steal a kiss from her, which she avoided saying: "a woman kissed, a woman dishonored"—these outbursts would be the "result of the advancing illness". On 9 February 1871, he dedicated the verses of No Meeting du Comité du Pain to the campaign that was being carried out in the capital of Bahia to raise funds for the mutilated French, orphans and widows during the Franco-Prussian War. He made, at a soiree on 21 March 1871, a public declaration of his love for Agnese, to which she responded by singing a passage from Il Guarany by Carlos Gomes saying "Tutti dobbiamo amar": the feeling, even platonic, was reciprocal.

This unrequited love marked the poet's final production; in an example of how she inspired him, they went on an equestrian ride together to Barra Lighthouse under the moonlight, in May 1871, which he portrayed in the verses of Noite de Maio where, because Agnese compared the moon to a mirror, in the sixth part he described the scene thus: "The ethereal mirror / From the clouds rises / Reflects in joy / Your face". During the festivities of the 2nd of July (the maximum date in Bahia) she was invited to sing, but she did so only after consulting the poet, who was already seriously ill; with his death Agnese was confused by the opinion of the society she served, and stopped watching over her beloved. (Note: Forty-three years later, living in Verona, Agnese wrote to Olívia Carneiro Ribeiro, a former student, a missive in which she protested the way Xavier Marques had treated the "romance" with the poet—to which the author responded, in the second edition of his biographical work—and declared: "This divine poet who loved me so much, I confess, I also loved him very much and with an undefined love. No woman could have resisted so much talent, this supernatural genius, apart from his beauty. But, punishing my poor heart I said to him: "Shut up, hide your feeling, annihilate yourself, tear yourself to pieces, can't you see that this love for you is a crime? And so it was: I commanded, he obeyed... But only God knows how much I suffered...")

== Death ==
When I die... don't throw my dead body
In the pit of a gloomy cemetery...
I hate the mausoleum that awaits the dead
Like the traveler from that dismal hotel

— Castro Alves, "Quando eu Morrer", São Paulo, 1869

Writer Múcio Teixeira, in his 1896 biography of Castro Alves, recounted his last hint of vanity: "On the eve of the fatal day, after repeated pleas, they gave him a mirror. He contemplated himself for a few moments, visibly troubled, and stammered: "I am no longer the same... How death disfigures its victims!" He handed it over, painfully disappointed, and said: "No one else can enter here. I want you to remember what I was, not what I am!... As soon as I die, cover me with flowers and close my coffin immediately". A report published in 1921 by the magazine Bahia Illustrada brought the family record of the poet's death:

"He had retired the day before (29 July), writes the poet's sister, earlier than usual; a cloud of sadness and discouragement overshadowed his large expressive eyes and in vain his brothers and friends tried to call hope to that desolate soul: futile! In his mind, the figure of death began to project itself...

He then wanted his bed to be taken to the hall where he used to spend his days, and he was carried by his brother and friends, placed near a window, because, he said, «he wanted to die looking at the infinite blue, that infinite that will soon collect his last aspirations».

Days of atrocious suffering followed, interspersed only by brief moments of relief, and so cruel were they that on the eve of his death, at night, he asked the time and was answered—12. [he replied] «Is it possible, my God, yet another day of pain? ...» And there was so much distress in this exclamation, so much so that, having his cold hand between the hands of his sisters, he felt that a tear had fallen on it and then, squeezing them, he said:—«The warm beads I felt ...»—a reminiscence that came to him at the time, of one of his last poems—"A Virgem dos Últimos Amores".

On the following day, 6 July 1871, at 10 am, the enlightened and virtuous father Turíbio Tertuliano Fiúza administered the last sacraments. The last moments were approaching and still in all the lucidity of spirit, on one of the occasions when one of the sisters (Adelaide), in anguish, passes a handkerchief over her damp forehead, he, with an almost extinct voice, murmured to her:—«Keep this handkerchief ... with it you wiped the sweat of my agony ...». This was without great cravings or death rattles. Now motionless, his gaze fixed on that patch of sky that could be seen from the open window in front of the bed in which he was lying—little by little the light of that gaze was dimming, until it was completely diffused in the shadows of Eternity ... It was half past three in the afternoon ...".

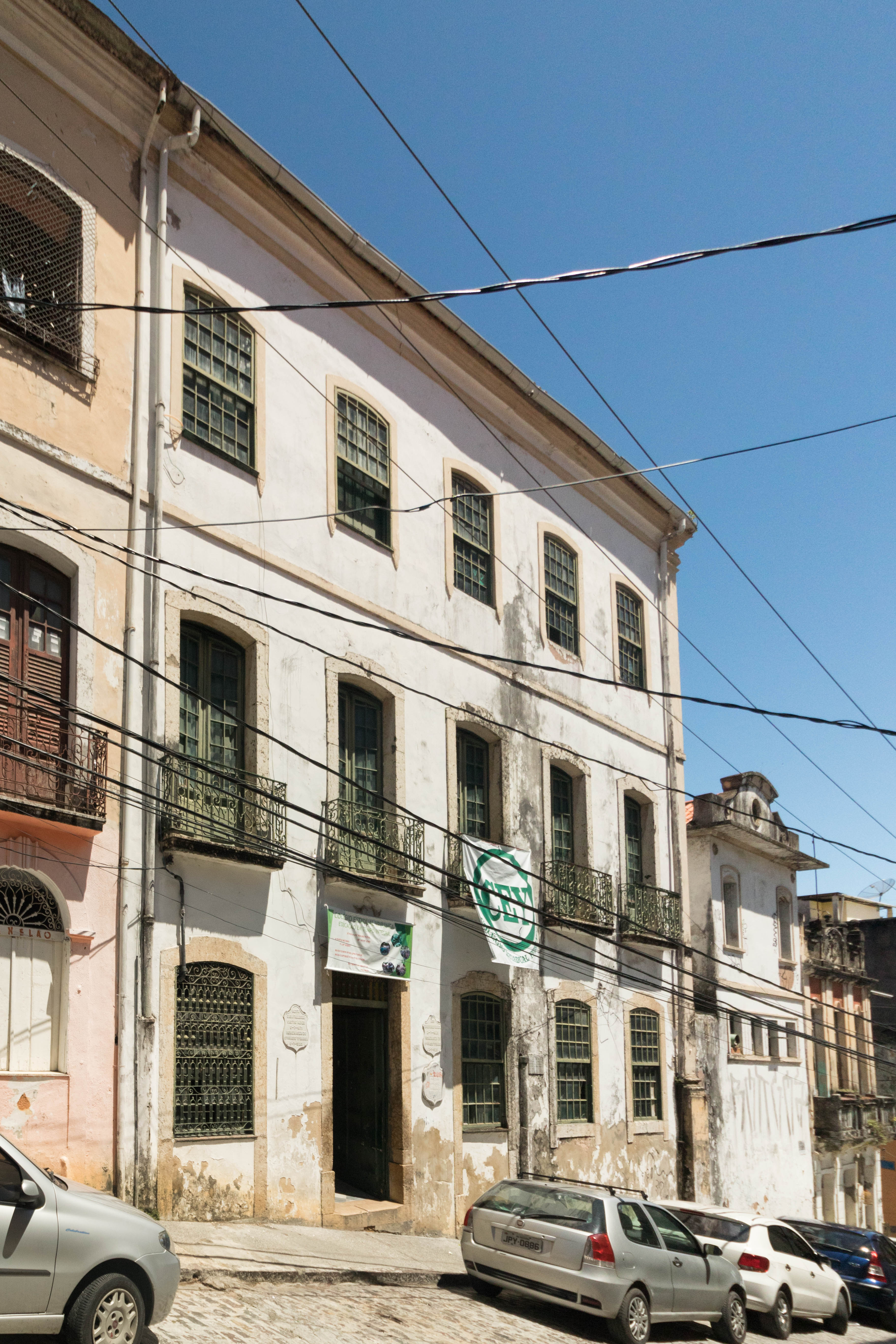
Alves family home (Solar do Sodré), where the poet died

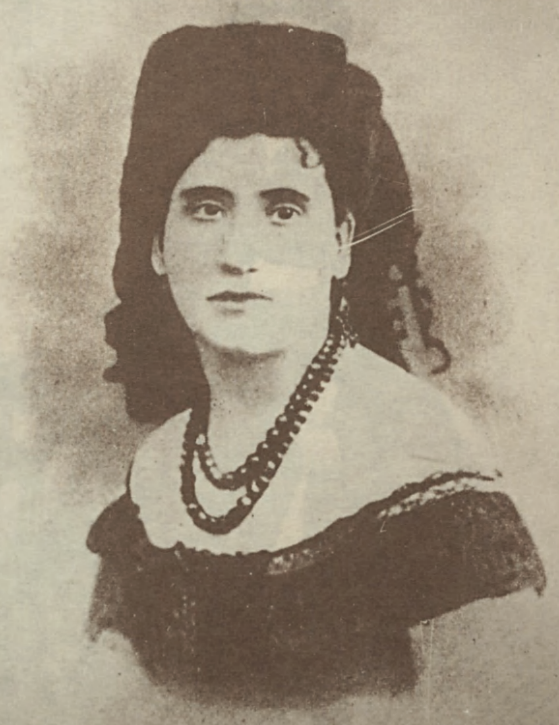
Castro Alves's last love: the Italian singer Agnese Trinci Murri, 1870

Múcio Teixeira, remembering the reverence that one has in Florence in front of the house where Dante lived, or in Caracas next to the pantheon where the remains of Simón Bolívar lie, preached that "Bahia's population, without distinction of sex or class, should go on the 6th of July of each year, in a spontaneous procession of imposing majesty, stop for a few moments in front of the sobrado number 24 on Rua Sodré, where on the 6th of July 1871, at 3 ½ o'clock in the afternoon, Castro Alves expired, at only 24 years".

Castro Alves was buried in the Campo Santo Cemetery, in a tomb in which a "pirate skull" was inserted which, in the words of a specialist, "is an allusion to death and the transience of life". His remains were, in the 20th century, transferred to the monument in his honor in the square that bears his name. The burial took place the day after the death (7 July) and he was buried in tomb 527. In 1874, the remains were transferred to the mausoleum at block 1, belonging to his stepmother, Maria Ramos Guimarães, who had purchased it for her husband's tomb. His sister Adelaide, who died in Rio de Janeiro on 22 September 1940, was the "faithful caretaker of the poet's memory, preserving his originals, informing about his life", recorded Afrânio Peixoto, concluding that "the fame of Castro Alves owes her a lot".

In 1971, the centenary of the writer's death took place. Despite the opposition of a grandnephew of the poet who advocated the construction of a pantheon for him, the then mayor of Salvador Antônio Carlos Magalhães decided to simply transfer his remains to the monument at Praça Castro Alves. This actually took place, without any special ceremony, on 6 July of that year. After the consecration received in the then imperial capital at the age of only twenty-one, and those that followed in "less than eight years, silly years, that between adolescence and youth, 'Castro Alves left a work without equal in our literatures'", according to Afrânio Peixoto, who compared him to his contemporaries who would later stand out, such as Ruy Barbosa, Joaquim Nabuco, Rodrigues Alves or Afonso Pena: had they died, like him, at the age of twenty-four, "not even the memory of the names would have remained with them and during that time the other gained lasting fame".

== Work ==
=== Background ===
==== Political context ====
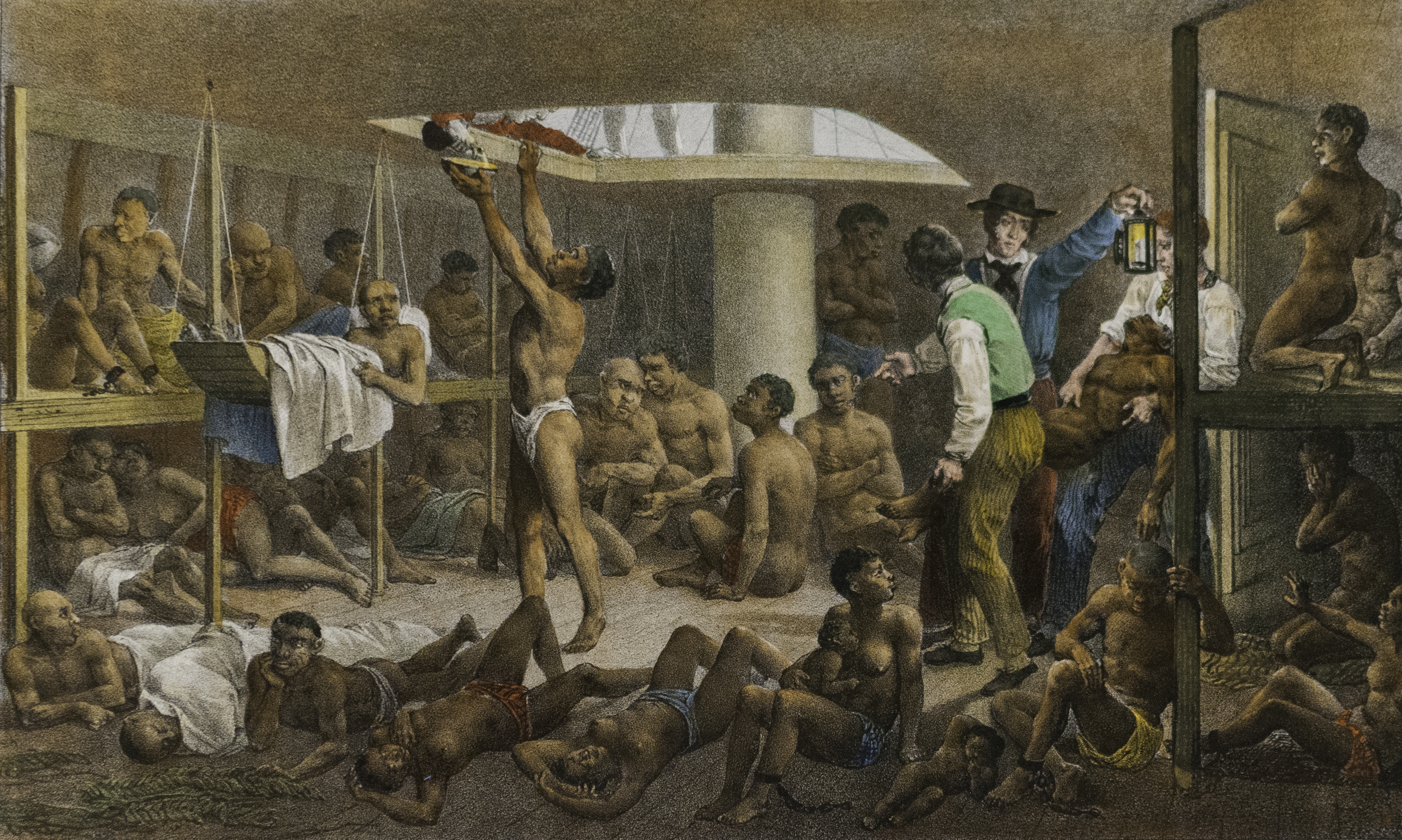
Slave ship, illustration by Johann Moritz Rugendas: the slave trade was denounced by Castro Alves in the verses of O Navio Negreiro

For the American researcher of the work of Castro Alves, Jon M. Tolman, his "biography serves not to define poetry, nor as a key to its understanding, but only as a kind of historical fitting, where we can glimpse with more authenticity the tactic poet's creativity". In this sense, a historical and cultural panorama serves "to make certain themes, attitudes and even the technique of his poetry more understandable".

The system of slavery prevailed in Brazil during the reign of emperor Pedro II, concentrating in the Northeast, in 1867, 47% of the captive population in the country (774 thousand people), while the cultivation of coffee in São Paulo led the number of slaves to double in the decade from 1864 to 1874 and made the abolitionist issue gain the same relevance there as in cities where the presence of blacks was large, such as Salvador and the capital of the Empire, Rio de Janeiro. Since 1850, the slave trade from Africa had been prohibited by the Eusébio de Queirós Law, with the episode of the "Pontinha Landing" on Itaparica Island taking place in Bahia on 29 October 1851—the last documented attempt to circumvent the prohibition of slave trafficking, in a demonstration of resistance in the province by traders and slave owners.

There were then only two law schools in the country, both founded in 1828: one in Recife and the other in São Paulo; in both, the liberal and civic vision was instilled in the thinking elite of the country, in addition to the conception of national unity—which did not, in fact, occur in the provinces. In these academies, teachers and students were influenced by European authors such as Ernest Renan, who preached the end of Catholic influence in public life, Hippolyte Taine and Auguste Comte, with positivism, who brought, in the words of Sílvio Romero, a "bunch of new ideas " to which were added evolutionism, the change of law and politics, realism and naturalism, expanding in them the will to reform the country.

In Europe several revolutions occurred. In France, the Revolutions of 1830 took place, which in 1847 (Castro Alves's birth year) led to the deposition of the king and the holding of the first elections on the continent with direct, secret and universal suffrage for men. Italy and Germany lived through the struggles for their unification, reflecting nationalist ideas; in that first country, the guerrilla leader Giuseppe Garibaldi had played an important role, who, in addition to having already fought in Brazil, was married to the Brazilian Anita.

Among the main Brazilian facts of Castro Alves's time there is the so-called Religious Issue, which involved Freemasonry; contemporaries and friends of Castro Alves were Freemasons, such as Luís Gama and Ruy Barbosa, among others. Castro Alves was also a Freemason, and together with the former two he collaborated in the newspaper Radical Paulistano and in abolitionist campaigns. After the emancipation of the Spanish colonies in the Americas, several nations experienced internal and external conflicts until they established themselves. The Paraguayan War was the biggedt conflict in South America, uniting Brazil, Argentina and Uruguay in the Triple Alliance against the Paraguayan dictator Solano López, who invaded the territory of the current Brazilian state of Mato Grosso do Sul in 1864, providing in the following years battles that became epics such as the naval battle of Riachuelo and the passage of Humaitá (the latter worthy of an improvisation by the poet, in Rio de Janeiro); other conflicts marked the period in South America, such as the Platine War, in 1852, involving Brazil, and also the Spanish–South American War between Spain and Peru, whose independence Spain did not recognize until 1864, which also involved Chile, Bolivia and Ecuador and only concluded with the intervention of the United States. Despite the various conflicts, ideals of Pan-Americanism had been latent since the beginning of the 19th century, of which José Bonifácio had been a defender in Brazil, in the sense of uniting the new nations to sustain their independence.

The Paraguayan War, which would last until 1870, had an ambiguous result according to Joaquim Nabuco: the victory on the one hand marked the peak of the monarchy in Brazil, but also began its decline. In the words of authors Carlos Emílio Faraco and Francisco Marto de Moura in their analysis of O Navio Negreiro, the poetry of Castro Alves "reflects the historical moment of the time: the decline of the monarchy, the abolitionist struggle and the republican campaign".

==== Romanticism in literature ====
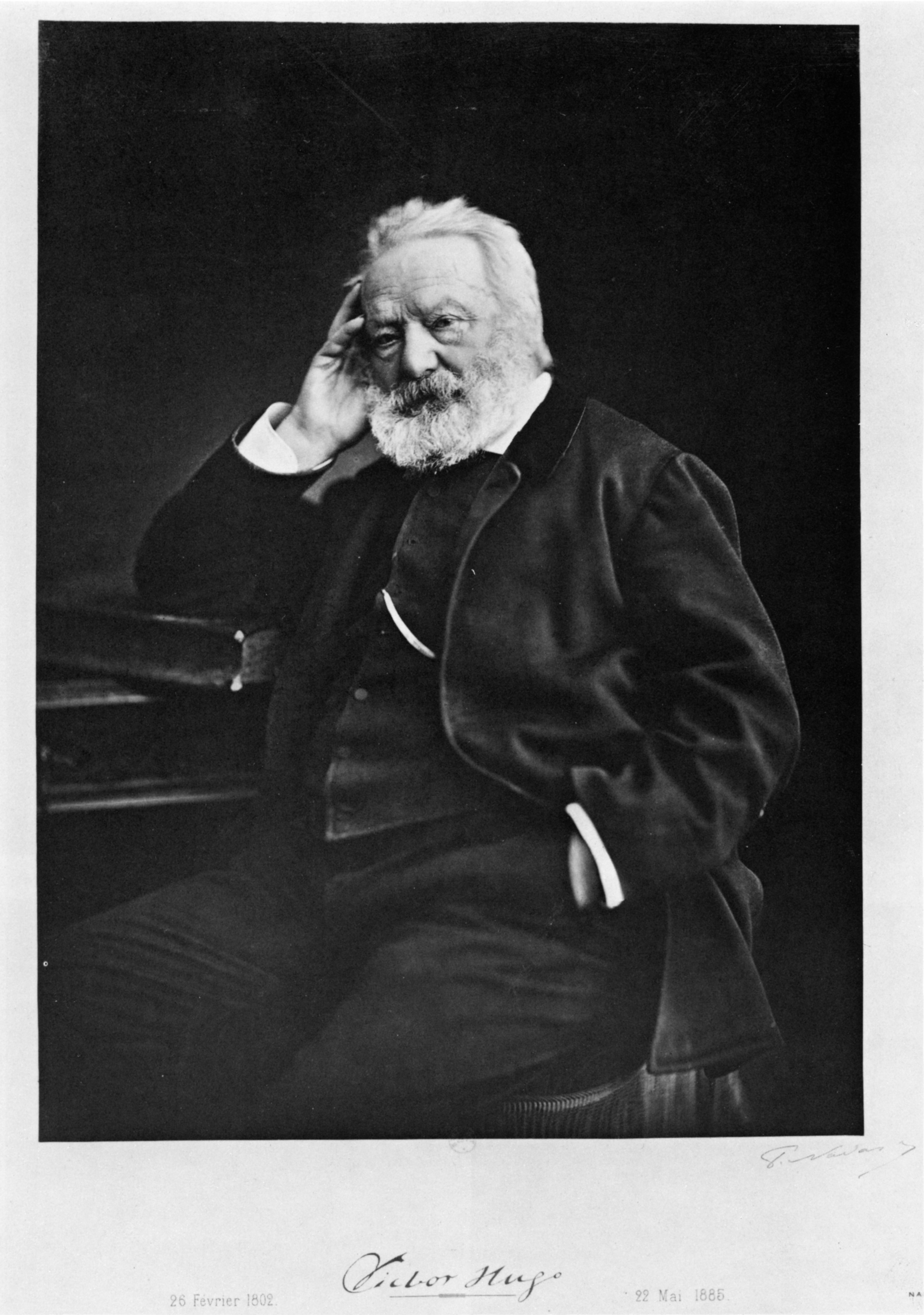
Victor Hugo: among the many influences of Castro Alves, the French author was the greatest (Note: On the importance of Hugo in the work of Castro Alves, several authors are unanimous in addition to Lêdo Ivo quoted in the text of this article, among which: Jorge Amado, making the caveat that "it is necessary not to attribute exclusively to Victor Hugo the libertarian and heroic sense of the poetry of Castro Alves" and that "he was an influence in this sense, but not the only one, nor perhaps even the most powerful", emphasizing that "nothing was more important for the poet Castro Alves than that encounter in his childhood with the genius of Hugo" and that without him perhaps his work would have taken a different direction and would not have reached the strength it had; Amado concluded: "No poet moved him so much, he admired none so much." Muniz Sodré said that many were influenced by Hugo, but that "The most emblematic of these thuribles is Castro Alves, an ardent singer of freedom, who was accused of being more "hugolater" than Brazilian, sometimes bordering on plagiarism". For the emeritus professor at USP, Célia Berrettini, he was "the poet with the greatest marks of influence of Victor Hugo in his work".)

Romanticism was an aesthetic movement that opposed the Classicism that preceded it. While the latter favored the nobility, the former portrayed the bourgeoisie: its authors were young people from the middle or popular class, as well as the characters they portrayed. The romantic authors, therefore, had subjectivism and freedom of creation as characteristics (marked by the primacy of feelings, historicism, pessimism and even a distancing from reality and worship of nature). This aesthetic movement derived from the rise of the post-French Revolution bourgeoisie in Europe: in England there was an exaltation of medieval times and Shakespeare's writings. In Germany, social conflicts were reflected in the works of Goethe and Schiller, where pessimism, emotion, melancholy and appreciation of death emerged as a counterpoint to social transformations.

Several European authors influenced Castro Alves: Lord Byron, Lamartine, Musset, Heinrich Heine and even Shakespeare who, translated into French, "became a true romantic obsession" in the words of Lêdo Ivo. But his greatest influence was Victor Hugo himself: according to Castro Alves, Victor Hugo was "his great master", "to whom he united an undisguised elective affinity, whether of a lyrical nature, whether of a political and tribunic nature", assimilating many things from him, "fishing in the immense Hugoan ocean a considerable number of visions, themes and images", in such a way that "he imitated and paraphrased him with the most blatant ease".

In Portugal, exponents of this movement, in literature, were the authors Almeida Garrett, Alexandre Herculano, Júlio Dinis and, in the end, Camilo Castelo Branco. Initiated in 1825, romanticism lasted four decades there, which scholars divide into three moments: the first generation (from 1825 to 1840); the second (from 1840 to 1860) and, finally, the third from 1860, which is formed by authors already in a transition to realism. In Brazil, the movement coincided with the need to affirm nationality, with the country's independence in 1822. As in Portugal, literati divided Romanticism into three generations: the first, marked by nationalism and patriotism (which included Gonçalves Dias and Gonçalves de Magalhães); the second, marked by the influence of Lord Byron and with themes centered on love, death, doubt, irony and sarcasm and, in some, Satanism (whose exponents were Casimiro de Abreu, Álvares de Azevedo, Junqueira Freire and Fagundes Varela); and finally the third, which consisted of the so-called condorists and abolitionists, of which the greatest exponent was Castro Alves.

=== Analysis ===
==== Didactic analysis ====
Castro Alves's poetic work is divided, in didactic works, into two groups: social poetry and lyrical-loving poetry. For Faraco and Moura, contrary to the other romantic poets who explained their lack of adaptation to the outside world as the result of their internal conflicts, Castro Alves justified this problem with the maladjustment of man to his environment and in the "eternal struggle between oppressors and oppressed"; the poet's production has, in addition to the lyrical and amorous production, the "poetry of a social character"; even in the case of the lyrical verses, Castro Alves is distinguished by having "a more realistic and sensual vision of love and women", as these, although still ideally beautiful and perfect, are concrete, materialized people.

Samira Campedelli analyzed his work along the same lines: "besides a certain 'Byronian morbidity' and contrasting with it, Castro Alves's poetry presents two other aspects: sensual amorous lyricism and epic condorism"; in the first case, the inflamed lyricism derives from the real female figure, close and conquered, while in the second he innovates by bringing a "loud, open, frank" tone when he defends the slaves and portrays their misery in a "hyperbolic and eloquent way", with "violent strokes" and thus breaking with the "I"-centered vision of his predecessors.

==== Criticism ====
Professor of Brazilian Literature at the University of New Mexico Jon M. Tolman, in an analysis of the poet's work, pondered: "Among many other Brazilian authors conveniently boxed in by critics, we can highlight Castro Alves". Marques da Cruz, in his História da Literatura, records: "Many of his verses suffer (says Carlos de Laet) from the emphasis peculiar to the so-called Condor school, which, starting from Hugo's imitation, decayed into pure Gongorism".

Fausto Cunha pointed out what would be, for him, major defects in Castro Alves's production: a limited poet without a clear evolution, either in technique or in his theme; his entire production was made according to the current standards of romanticism, a "poet who has only one string on the lyre" and even that string was borrowed. In his analysis, "it was from 1868 onwards that his poetic personality asserted itself with autonomy and began, in turn, to influence his contemporaries. when the reason touched him more closely. The breakup with Eugênia Câmara and the last love of Agnese Trinci Murri plunged him back into the ocean of ultra-romantic commonplaces, almost all of which have now been surpassed by their own collection". Cunha continued, to conclude in a negative way: "In many respects, Castro Alves' poetic trajectory is disconcerting and seems to support the thesis—certainly an extremist one—that the poet was an 'accomplished'. Within a narrow limit, it is possible to allude to a certain progressive exhaustion of his lyric after 1869 (...) If the work of Castro Alves' adolescence is dotted with pastichos, his coming of age will suffer from completely unnecessary interferences (...) The impression he leaves us, in the final phase, is not quite that of a 'satisfied', of a 'fulfilled' man: it is of an annihilated one—with the peculiar bursts of optimism and energy".

Contradicting Fausto Cunha's position, Jon M. Tolman said that the analysis of the poet's work suffers from the insertion of old productions among recent ones, as occurs in anthologies, noting that his final production has few admirers in Brazil; Tolman considered that "poetry written after returning to Bahia presents marked integral characteristics" and that the analysis made of his mature verses mix with others from earlier periods; about negative criticism such as that of Cunha, the American author concluded: "One of the disadvantages of literary acclaim is the weight of the critic's judgment, which often interferes with fair appreciation".

When talking about Victor Hugo's influence on Castro's work, Lêdo Ivo compared him to Rimbaud, who also imitated the French writer and who had written about the sea without ever having seen it, so too "Castro Alves celebrated the Paulo Afonso Falls without having to go there; and his vision is more convincing and realistic than that of the visitors". (Note: Contrary to Lêdo Ivo's opinion, Castro Alves himself testified that he had actually visited the largest cataract on the São Francisco River, which disappeared with the formation of Lake Sobradinho; on 13 September 1867 he wrote to a friend: "Today I'm going to Boa Vista to finish the prologue to Escravos, which only lacks the description of the Paulo Afonso Falls. It's true, I tell you that I'm going these eight days to see the gigantic fall of San Francisco up close. Make me Chateaubriand in this other Niagara".) The same author, speaking of the influence of the romantic authors who inspired the poet (already mentioned Hugo, Byron, Lamartine, Musset, Heine and even Espronceda), "many of them he translated, parodied, imitated and plundered, transfused into these parodies, imitations and plunders the vigor of a new language and scorched with fervor" in such a way that "one of the most original poets of our language, and one of the most jealous of the outbursts of his inflamed self, will also be one of the most fond of imitation and paraphrase", but he does it "with so much skill and happiness " that nothing disqualifies him and makes his verses remain "readable" despite the outbursts, thanks to the rigor with which he worked the Portuguese language. A master's student at the Federal University of Uberlândia, making a comparison between the vision of black people by Castro Alves and Luís Gama, noted that Alves speaks of black people in the third person, while Gama speaks in the first person, concluding that "Luís Gama helped to create the Afro-Brazilian identity in order to promote changes in the discursive structures of the time, Castro Alves represented the black subject as a passive and resigned human being". (Note: The author seems, on the other hand, to be unaware that both were friends and colleagues at the Faculty of Law of São Paulo (which Gama refused to attend due to racism - and not because "he was prevented to do so", as she claims) and that they were both members of the same Masonic lodge (Loja América) in addition to sharing republican and abolitionist views. Another point ignored by the author is that Gama was the son of a white father and a black mother.)

== Homages ==
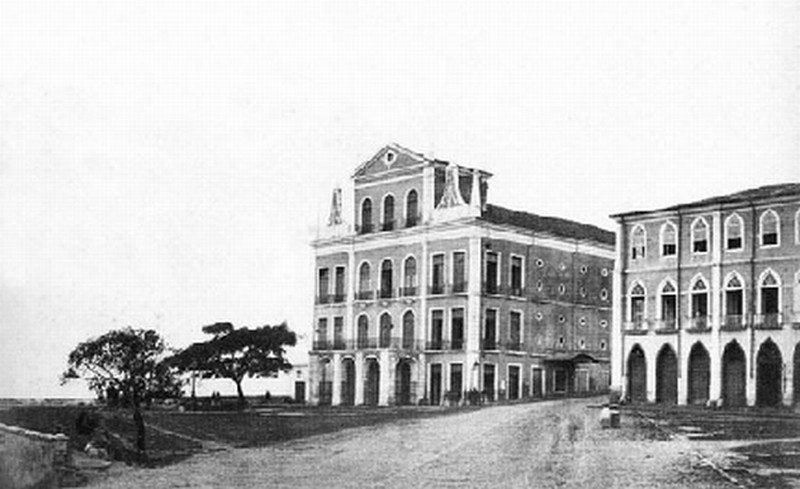
The former Largo de São Bento with the São João Theatre; since 1881 it is the Castro Alves Square

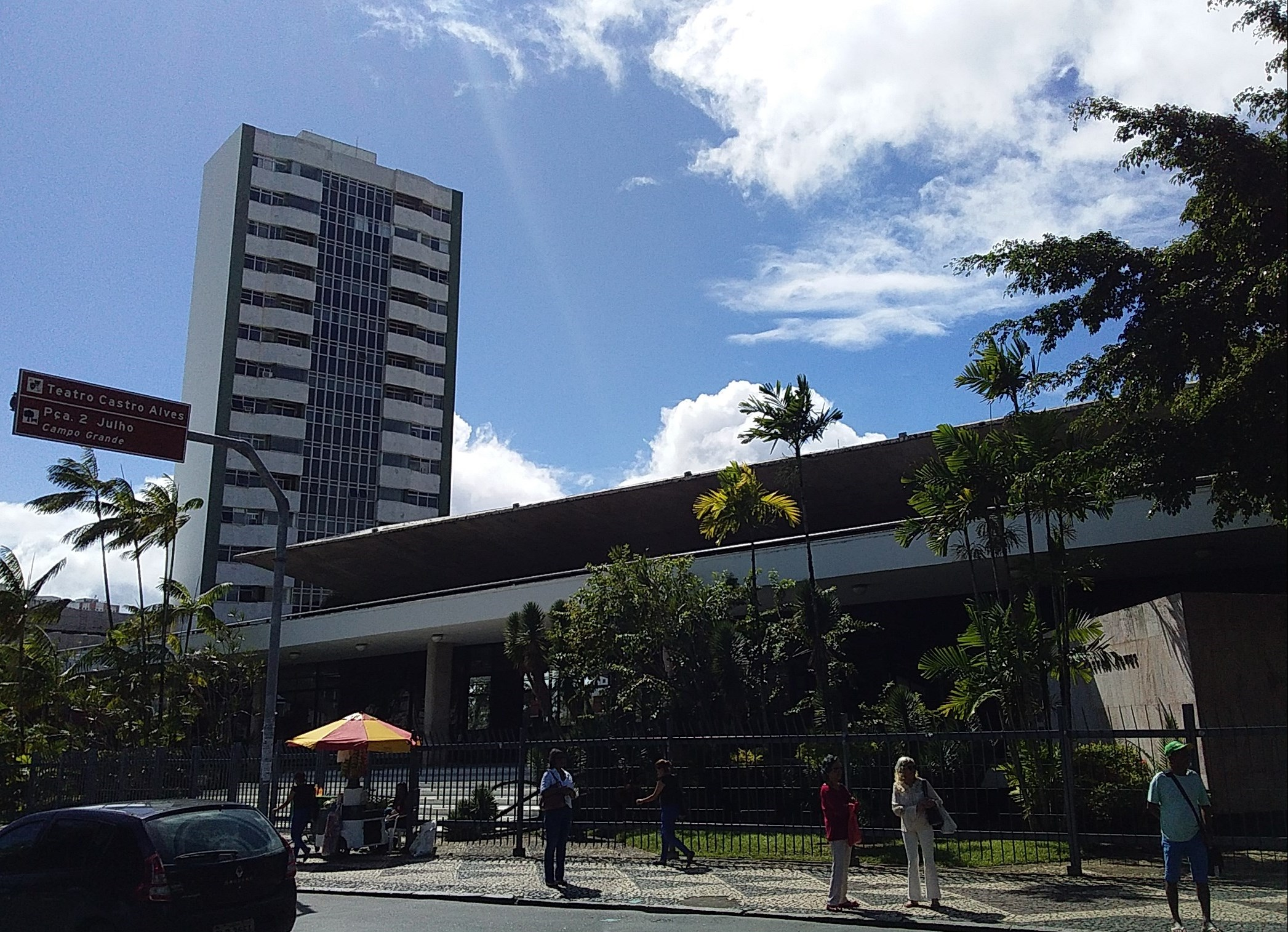
Teatro Castro Alves, the main concert hall in Bahia and a national heritage of Brazil

On 6 July 1881, ten years after the poet's death, the so-called Largo do Teatro, one of the main squares in Salvador, was renamed in his honor; in 1919 a statue was commissioned from the Italian sculptor Pasquale de Chirico; the monument was installed in the place where the "Fountain of Columbus" used to be and inaugurated on 6 July 1923; the statue, measuring 2.9 meters, is positioned on a pedestal (which gives it a total height of 11 meters) on the front of which is a sculpture of a couple of slaves, symbolizing their abolitionist struggle: Castro Alves Square is one of Salvador's symbols. In reference to the square, Caetano Veloso paraphrased the verse by Castro Alves "The square is for the people, like the sky is for the condor" from O Povo ao Poder, paying him the tribute "Castro Alves Square belongs to the people / Like the sky belongs to the airplane".

In 1895, the municipality of Curralinho was emancipated from Cachoeira; years later, the name of the city was changed to Castro Alves, in honor of the poet (sources differ as to whether it was by State Law No. 360 of 25 July 1900, or Law No. 790 of 25 June 1910). In 1947, the Instituto Nacional do Livro, of the Ministry of Education and Culture, celebrated the centenary of the poet's birth with a large exhibition, which resulted in a commemorative book, bringing important documents that were part of the event.

In 1948, at the suggestion of artists and intellectuals in Bahia, the then-deputy Antônio Balbino presented a bill for the construction of a theater in Praça 2 de Julho (better known as Campo Grande), following Adroaldo Ribeiro Costa's suggestion of naming the building after the poet, and expected to be completed in 1951. The original project would be in charge of the architects Alcides da Rocha Miranda and José de Souza Reis but, with Otávio Mangabeira assuming the state government, he passed the task to engineer Diógenes Rebouças, who started the work with a bold architecture. At the end of Mangabeira's term, Balbino was elected governor and, with an award-winning project, entrusted the work to José Bina Fonyat Filho and Humberto Lemos; the inauguration was scheduled to take place on 4 July 1958 but, five days before, a mysterious fire almost completely destroyed it. The attached but unaffected "Concha Acústica" was inaugurated in 1959, and Teatro Castro Alves underwent nine years of renovations until it was finally inaugurated on 4 March 1967, under Lomanto Júnior's governorship. The "TCA", as it is known, has been part of Brazil's national heritage since 2013, listed by IPHAN.

On 8 March 1971, the then governor of the state of Bahia Luís Viana Filho, as part of the homage to the poet on the centenary of his death, inaugurated the Castro Alves Historical Park in the city of Cabaceiras do Paraguaçu, in the former headquarters of the Cabaceiras Farm. The park museum with a total area of 52 thousand square meters located in the center of the city. According to the writer Edivaldo Boaventura, the space aimed to recall the poet's "birthplace and childhood scenarios". Since 1977, the day of the poet's birth was considered, unofficially, as National Poetry Day and it was celebrated that way until, in 2015, senator Alvaro Dias proposed another date, this time honoring Carlos Drummond de Andrade; after this law was passed, his birthday ceased to be officially the date of poetry in Brazil. In 2019, the third edition of the Pelourinho International Literary Festival (Flipelô) honored the poet.

=== Monuments and sculptures ===
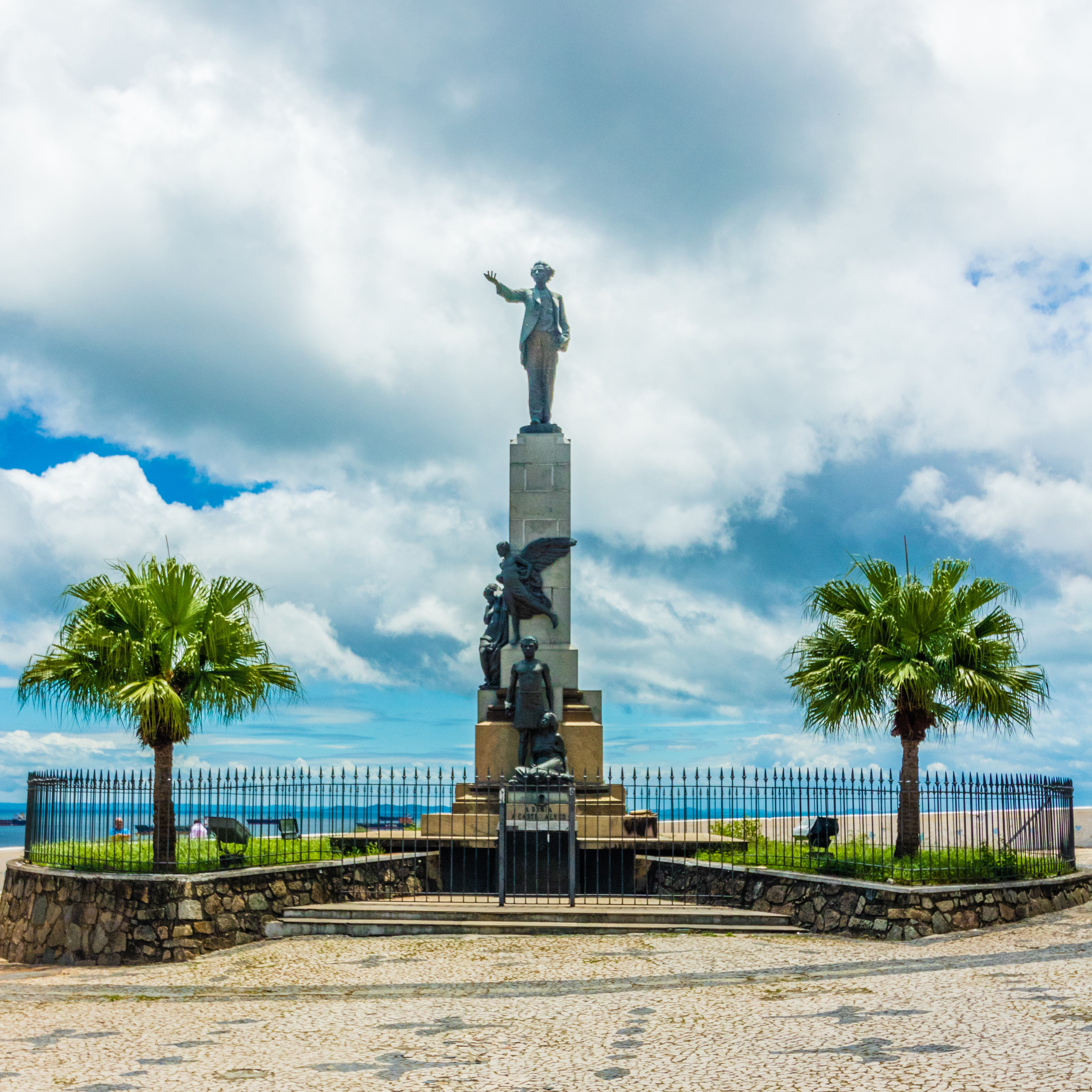
Statue of Castro Alves in Salvador

In addition to the statue of De Chirico in Salvador, other monuments honor the poet in Brazil. On Passeio Público in Rio de Janeiro there is a bronze bust of the poet, the work of sculptor Eduardo de Sá, inaugurated in 1917 and the main differentiator being the pedestal in marble of different colors. In its first issue, without identifying the author, an article in the Rio de Janeiro magazine Bahia Illustrada criticized this work: "the bust of Castro Alves, found in Passeio Público, looks just as much like him as any of his ignored companions of the bohemia and student life of his time", and that the statue bears "no identity with his face", concluding that it is only known to be about the poet because it bears his name written in bronze.

In 1947, in Recife, a bust was inaugurated in honor of the poet's centenary, a work carried out by the sculptor Celso Antônio de Menezes, located in Adolfo Cirne square, in front of the same Faculty of Law where Castro Alves once studied. In 1948, the Brazilian sculptor Humberto Cozzo went to Italy where, in Florence, he created the statue of the "Poet of Liberty", financed by the Ação Cultural Castro Alves. The sculptor, already established in the country, had won a competition to choose the statue, with the prize being a trip to Europe lasting a year, leaving in August of that year. The contest ended in 1947, the year of the poet's centenary, and the meeting to choose the winner (in which Mateus Fernandes, Celita Vacani, Francisco Andrade, Almir Pinto, Honório Peçanha and Modestino Kanto also competed) was documented on film. Cozzo would become one of the masters of the sculptor Mário Cravo, who, on his mother's side, was the poet's cousin. Other sculptures honor the poet in various parts of the country. In the city of Jacobina, Praça da Matriz has a monument to the poet, restored in 2016.

Monuments and sculptures to Castro Alves

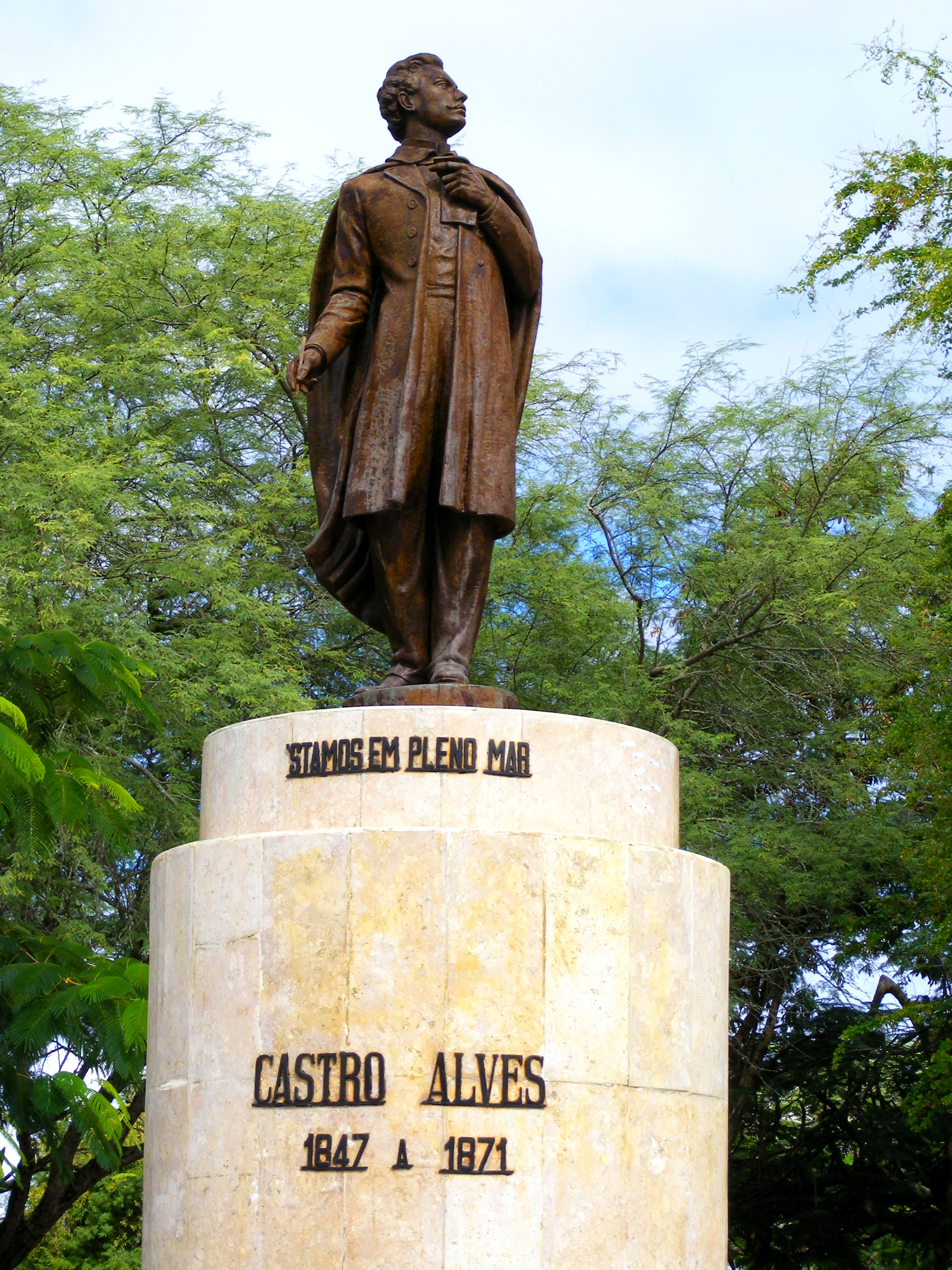
Statue in the municipality of Castro Alves, Bahia, with the first verse of O Navio Negreiro: "'Stamos em pleno mar" (We are in the middle of the sea)

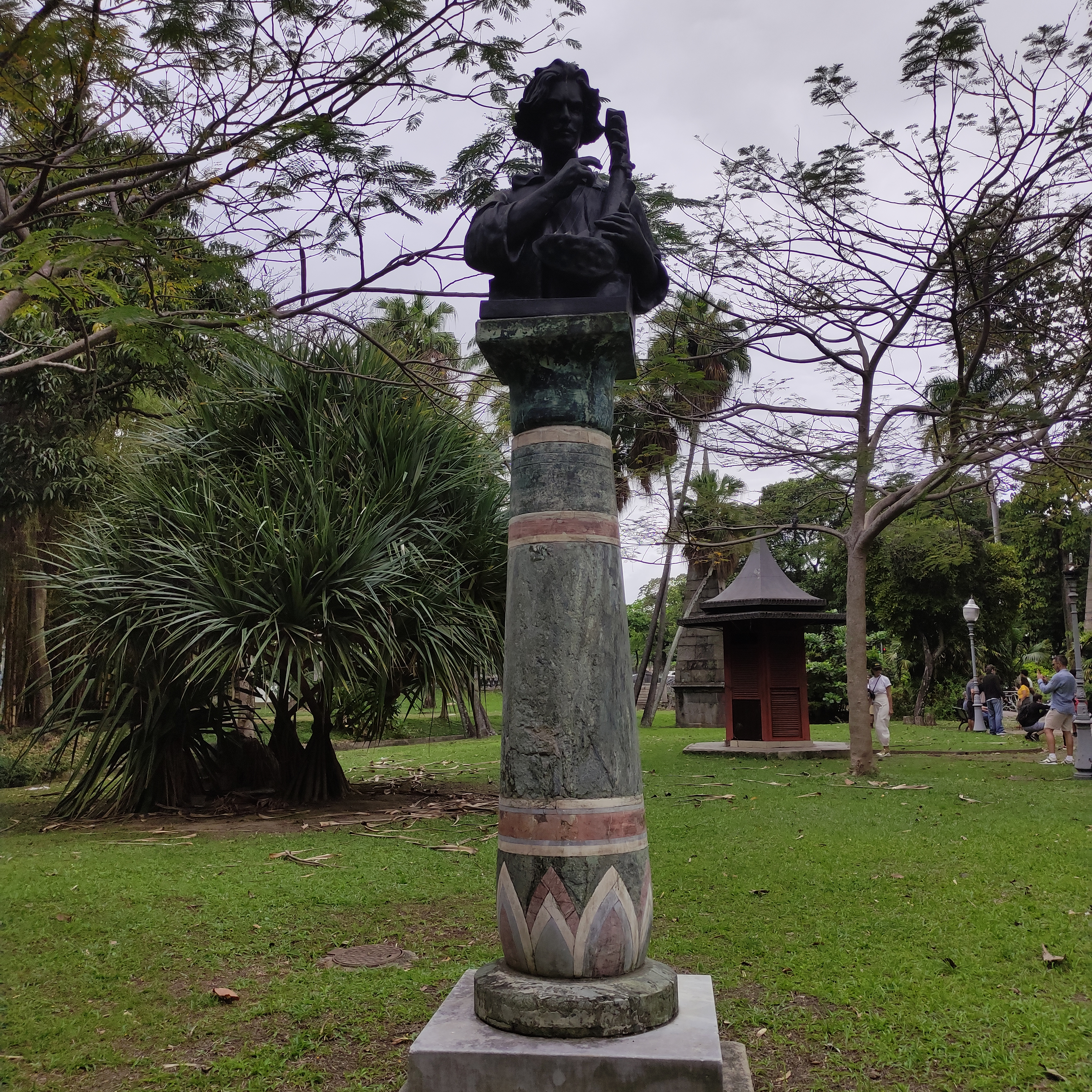
Bust in Passeio Público, Rio de Janeiro

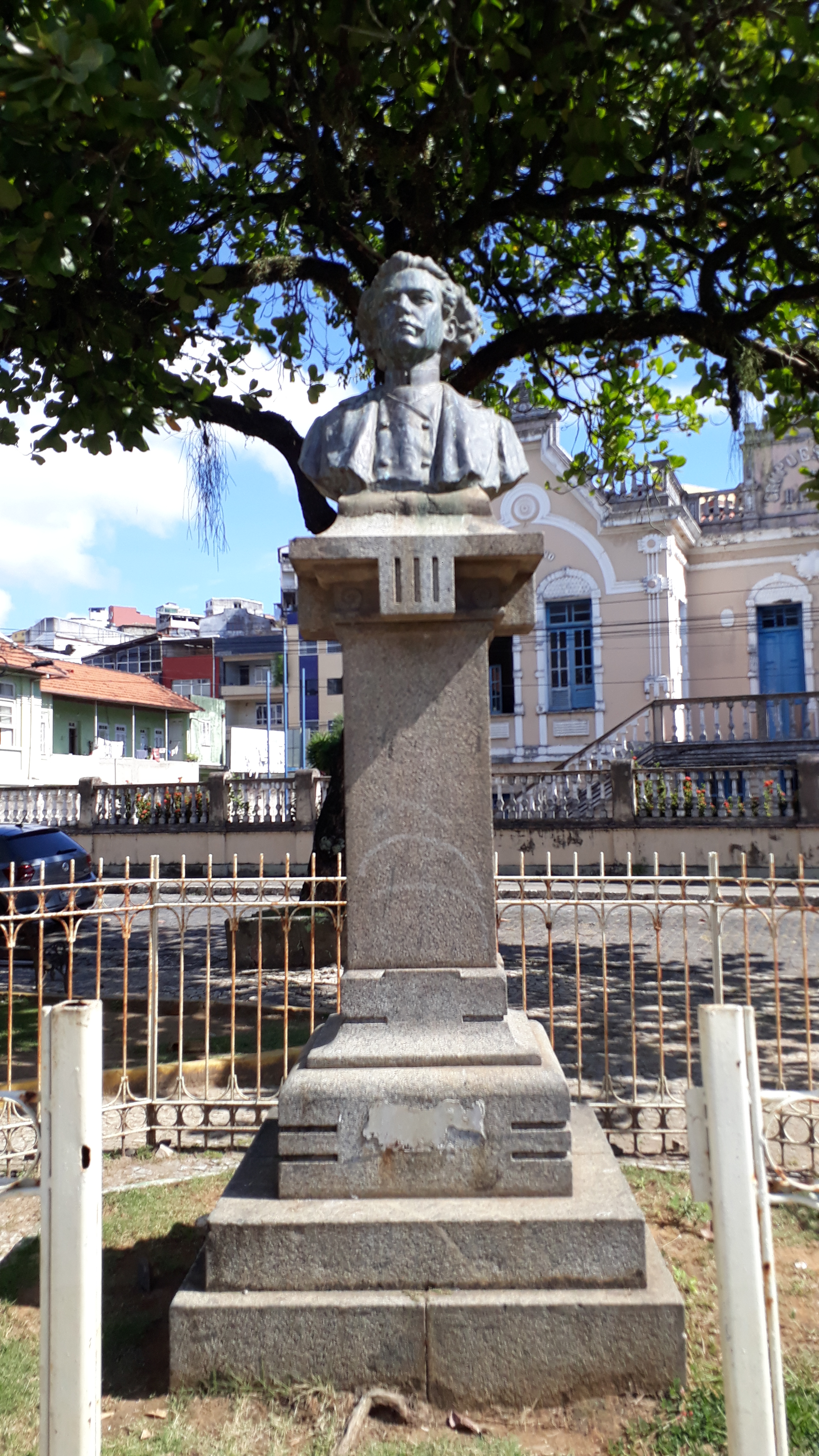
Bust in Ilhéus, Bahia

=== Brazilian Academy of Letters ===
The Brazilian Academy of Letters (ABL) named in his honor, at the suggestion of founding member Valentim Magalhães, its chair number seven, which has Castro Alves as its patron. His chair was the target of the first major internal dispute within the academy, in 1905; that year Euclides da Cunha was elected to occupy the vacancy left by the founder of Chair 7, Valentim Magalhães, and it was up to literary critic Sílvio Romero to deliver the speech welcoming the new member of the Brazilian sylogee. Romero, from Sergipe like Tobias Barreto, was critical of Castro Alves's work because of the student disputes in Recife (due to parochialism and partiality, in the words of Afrânio Peixoto). In his speech, which the protocol called for to be complimentary, he turned to the controversial nature of his writings, offending even the President of the Republic, Afonso Pena, present there—in addition to harsh criticism of Castro Alves (patron), Valentim (founder) and Cunha (to take office). Once the academy's own headquarters were built, the "Salão dos Românticos" was installed there, where there are busts of the main authors of Brazilian romanticism, among them Castro Alves; it is in this place that deceased scholars are buried.

=== Birth centenary in 1947 ===
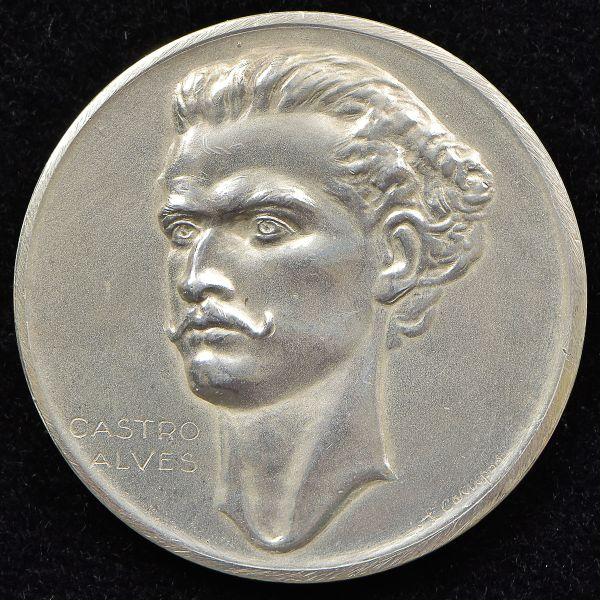
Commemorative medal in silver

1947 was the centenary year of the poet's birth, and several events in his memory took place, especially in Bahia and Rio de Janeiro, then the Federal District. In the previous year, the federal government held a contest for the postal stamp design commemorating the centenary, which the designer Alberto Lima won.

The Ministry of Education and Health awarded medals bearing the poet's effigy on the front, and on the back the verses of his authorship: "Green and gold banner of my land, / That the Brazilian breeze kisses and sways, / Banner that in the sunlight represents / The divine promises of hope…", a work by engraver L. Campos. The Ministry also held, in Rio de Janeiro, an Exhibition Commemorative of the Centenary of Castro Alves, directed by Augusto Meyer and started on 14 March. In the same year, the city of Rio de Janeiro instituted an essay contest in several categories, such as the best biography of the poet or a novel set at some point in his life.

In Salvador, there was a large program of events, which took place from 5 to 15 March 1947, which included lectures, a literary contest by the Academy of Letters of Bahia and a meeting of Academies of Letters, a biobibliographic exhibition by the Instituto Geográfica e Histórico da Bahia and finally closed with a gala ball at the Clube Bahiano de Tênis. The ABL representative at the event was Pedro Calmon from Bahia. The Brazilian Academy, in turn, held conferences on the writer, held by some of its members such as Clementino Fraga and Pedro Calmon, a campaign for the construction of a monument to the poet, and a biobibliographic exhibition in the halls of the Petit Trianon, its headquarters.

== Legacy ==
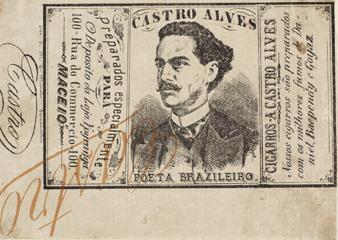
"Castro Alves" cigarette: the poet's name was widely used

Castro Alves's influence was felt during his lifetime, as the literary historian José Marques da Cruz pointed out: "His poetry O Navio Negreiro was memorized by many, having contributed to the abolition of slavery, intensely, as it was recited in all theaters and halls (...) He was an abolitionist (before there was the abolitionist party) and republican". In 1882, a parody of O Navio Negreiro was published in Rio de Janeiro, with the title A Canoa do Martinho, part of Political Satires and anonymously authored (it kept the signature of "Musset", one of the writers of predilection of Castro Alves).

In his epic work of 1950, Canto Geral, the Chilean writer Pablo Neruda inserted Castro Alves among the liberators of America, in the poem "Castro Alves do Brasil" (IV Canto, poem 29), where he stated that Castro Alves was the "poet of our America" for having given the slaves a voice where "...in doors hitherto closed (...) fighting, freedom would enter" and, finally, ended with the verses: "leave me, poet of our America, / to crown your head with the laurels of the people. / Your voice joined the eternal and loud voice of men. / You sang well. You sang as one should sing".

Jorge Amado reflected the poet not only in his work The ABC of Castro Alves, but also in his only play O Amor do Soldado. In this 1947 work, the poet is the protagonist in his love for Eugênia Câmara, starting in 1866 the narrative that, in its nineteen scenes, presents several of the historical characters such as Joaquim Nabuco, Ruy Barbosa, Tobias Barreto, Antônio Borges da Fonseca and Fagundes Varela, in addition to Amado himself, who appears in interventions to explain the historical context; in this work Amado sought to show the relevance of Castro Alves's production in the social struggles of his time: abolition and republicanism.

His popular acceptance made him one of the best known poets in the country, lending his name to public places, educational and cultural establishments, associations and even companies; it also appeared in cigarette and match brands; artists such as Benedito Irivaldo de Souza, known as Vado, performed more than five thousand theatrical presentations of O Navio Negreiro in São Paulo, which he took to schools and theaters in that state.

Not only elite readers and artists appreciated Castro Alves, as he is a constant in the work of popular authors such as Rogaciano Leite, Bule-Bule or Rodolfo Coelho Cavalcante, who said he is "the greatest poet in the world of all times", in addition to a vast range of cordel literature dealing with the poet; historian and cordelist Franklin Maxado demonstrated that Alves had used Repente in his disputes with Tobias Barreto – and that the poet's influence on popular art was also reciprocal.

=== In cinema ===
Castro Alves was portrayed as a character in movies, played by Paulo Maurício in the 1949 Luso-Brazilian fiction film Vendaval Maravilhoso (aka "Castro Alves—Um Vendaval Maravilhoso"), with singer Amália Rodrigues playing actress Eugênia Câmara; the work was restored in 2003 by Cinemateca Portuguesa; as informed in the film itself, the work was inspired "in the life of Castro Alves—O Poeta dos Escravos. This film is not a biography, only the authors studied the great biographers of the poet: Afrânio Peixoto, Pedro Calmon, Jorge Amado and Lopes Rodrigues". Director Leitão de Barros also wrote a book that tells the story of the film, entitled "How I saw Castro Alves and Eugênia Câmara in the wonderful whirlwind of their lives" about that "eloquent young man from Muritiba" and his Portuguese lover. In 1999 the poet was portrayed by actor Bruno Garcia in the film Castro Alves - Retrato Falado do Poeta, where he is portrayed in his fights for the Republic and for abolition, "in addition to showing his passionate and even womanizing side".

== Notes ==
Preceded by New creation	Brazilian Academy of Letters – Patron of the 7th chair	Succeeded by Valentim Magalhães (founder)
