= Paraguaçu (disambiguation) =

Paraguaçu is a municipality in the state of Minas Gerais, Brazil.

Paraguaçu or Paraguassu may also refer to:

== Geography ==
- Paraguaçu Paulista, municipality in the state of São Paulo, Brazil
- Paraguaçu River, in Bahia state, Brazil
- Cabaceiras do Paraguaçu, municipality in the state of Bahia, Brazil
- Cachoeira, also Cachoeira do Paraguaçu, municipality in the state of Bahia, Brazil

== People ==
- Catarina Paraguaçu (died 1586), Brazilian Tupinambá Indian, Christian visionary, wife of Caramuru
- Ezequiel Paraguassu (born 1963), Brazilian judoka, competitor at the 1988 and 1992 Summer Olympics
