= Espumas Flutuantes =

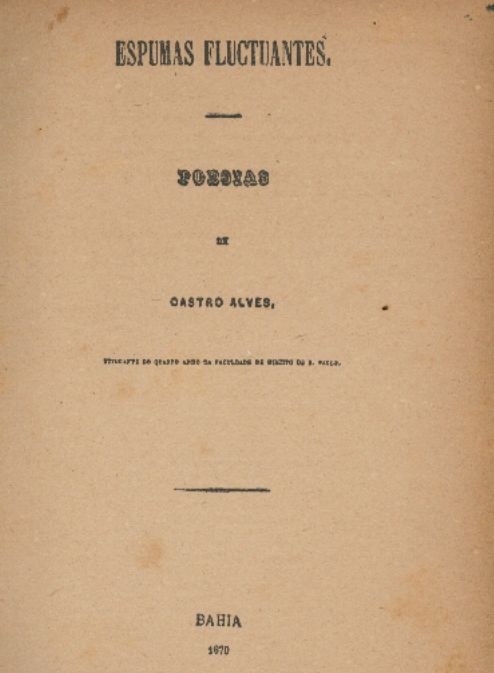
- Cover of the first edition
- Author: Castro Alves
- Language: Portuguese language
- Genre: Poetry
- Publisher: Tipografia de Camilo de Lellis Masson & C.A.
- Publication date: 1870
- Media type: Hardcover

Espumas Flutuantes (Floating Foam) is an 1870 book of poems by Brazilian Romantic poet Castro Alves. It was the only work Alves published in his lifetime, because of his premature death from tuberculosis one year later. It is one of his most famous books, the other one being Os Escravos, published in 1883. Espumas Flutuantes was dedicated to Castro Alves' family, as seen in the book's "dedicatory". It has 53 poems, whose themes are mostly unrequited love, and odes such as "Ode ao dous de julho" and "O livro e a América".

== Bibliography ==
- Carlos Alberto Gonçalves Lopes (2003). "Glossário do livro Espumas Flutuantes" (PDF). Revista philologus (in Portuguese). 9 (26): 102–116. ISSN 1413-6457. Wikidata Q107399695.
- Nilce Sant'Anna Martins (1974). "Os nomes próprios na poesia de Castro Alves". Língua e Literatura (in Portuguese). 3: 43–57. ISSN 0101-4862. Wikidata Q107399827.
