= Eugênia Câmara =

Portuguese actress

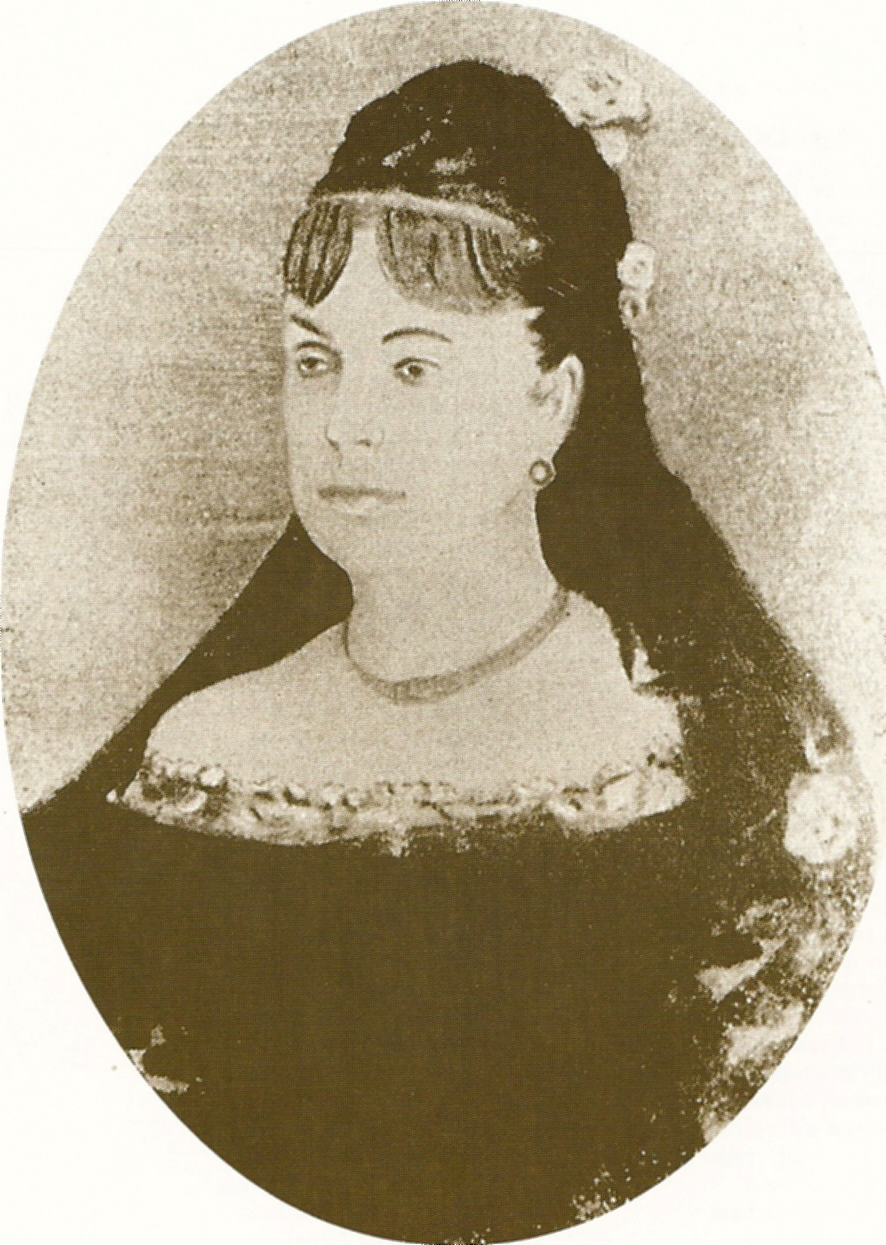
- Eugênia Infante da Câmara (c. 1860).
- Born: April 9, 1837; Lisbon, Portugal
- Died: May 28, 1874 (aged 37); Rio de Janeiro, Brazil
- Partner: Castro Alves (1866-1868)

Eugênia Infante da Câmara (1837–1874) was a Portuguese actress, poet, author and director of plays, active in both Portugal and Brazil. As well as for her own artistic achievements, she is remembered for her affair with, and influence upon, the Brazilian poet Castro Alves. She was born in Lisbon, on April 9, 1837, and died in Rio de Janeiro on May 28, 1874.

When she was 22 years old, Câmara traveled to Rio de Janeiro, Brazil. She met Castro Alves in 1866 and fell in love with him. For two years the couple lived and traveled together until they split up in January 1868.

A fictionalized version of Câmara was played by actress Amália Rodrigues in the 1949 Brazilian movie Vendaval Maravilhoso.
