= São João da Bahia Theater =

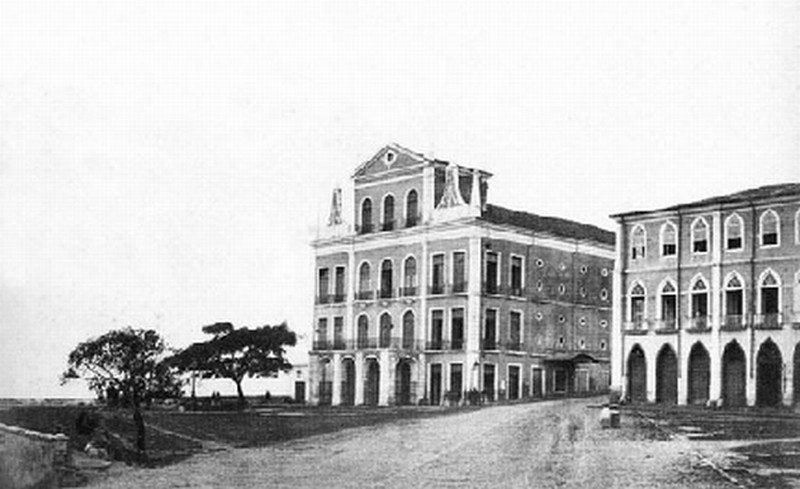
An image of São João da Bahia Theater

São João da Bahia Theater was a 19th-century Brazilian theater located at Castro Alves Square (formerly Sé district) in the Salvador, Bahia. It was started to be built in 1806 and inaugurated in 1812. It was a very large Theater in Brazil, with a seating capacity of around two thousand people.

There is a virtual museum, the São João da Bahia Virtual Museum, that introduces this theater.
