= Cabaceiras do Paraguaçu =

Municipality of Bahia, Brazil

- Municipality
- Location in Brazil
- Coordinates: 12°33′S 39°11′W
- Country: Brazil
- Region: Nordeste
- State: Bahia

Population (2020)
  - Total: 18,911
- Time zone: UTC−3 (BRT)

Cabaceiras do Paraguaçu is a municipality in the state of Bahia in the North-East region of Brazil.

== See also ==
- List of municipalities in Bahia
