= Romantic literature =

Literature of the Romantic Period

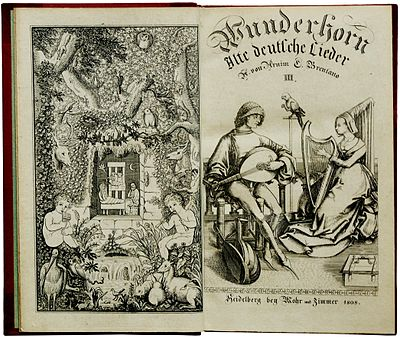
Title page of Volume III of Des Knaben Wunderhorn, 1808

In literature, Romanticism found recurrent themes in the evocation or criticism of the past, the cult of "sensibility" with its emphasis on women and children, the isolation of the artist or narrator, and respect for nature. Furthermore, several romantic authors, such as Edgar Allan Poe, Charles Maturin and Nathaniel Hawthorne, based their writings on the supernatural/occult and human psychology. Romanticism tended to regard satire as something unworthy of serious attention, a view still influential today. The Romantic movement in literature was preceded by the Restoration and the Enlightenment and succeeded by Realism.

Some authors cite 16th-century poet Isabella di Morra as an early precursor of Romantic literature. Her lyrics covering themes of isolation and loneliness, which reflected the tragic events of her life, are considered "an impressive prefigurement of Romanticism", differing from the Petrarchist fashion of the time based on the philosophy of love.

The precursors of Romanticism in English poetry go back to the middle of the 18th century, including figures such as Joseph Warton (headmaster at Winchester College) and his brother Thomas Warton, Professor of Poetry at Oxford University. Joseph maintained that invention and imagination were the chief qualities of a poet. The Scottish poet James Macpherson influenced the early development of Romanticism with the international success of his Ossian cycle of poems published in 1762, inspiring both Goethe and the young Walter Scott. Thomas Chatterton is generally considered the first Romantic poet in English. Both Chatterton and Macpherson's work involved elements of fraud, as what they claimed was earlier literature that they had discovered or compiled was, in fact, entirely their own work. The Gothic novel, beginning with Horace Walpole's The Castle of Otranto (1764), was an important precursor of one strain of Romanticism, with a delight in horror and threat, and exotic picturesque settings, matched in Walpole's case by his role in the early revival of Gothic architecture. Tristram Shandy, a novel by Laurence Sterne (1759–67), introduced a whimsical version of the anti-rational sentimental novel to the English literary public.

== Germany ==
An early German influence came from Johann Wolfgang von Goethe, whose 1774 novel The Sorrows of Young Werther had young men throughout Europe emulating its protagonist, a young artist with a very sensitive and passionate temperament. At that time Germany was a multitude of small separate states, and Goethe's works would have a seminal influence in developing a unifying sense of nationalism. Another philosophic influence came from the German idealism of Johann Gottlieb Fichte and Friedrich Schelling, making Jena (where Fichte lived, as well as Schelling, Hegel, Schiller and the brothers Schlegel) a centre for early German Romanticism (see Jena Romanticism). Important writers were Ludwig Tieck, Novalis, Heinrich von Kleist and Friedrich Hölderlin. Heidelberg later became a centre of German Romanticism, where writers and poets such as Clemens Brentano, Achim von Arnim, and Joseph Freiherr von Eichendorff (Aus dem Leben eines Taugenichts) met regularly in literary circles.

Important motifs in German Romanticism are travelling, nature, for example the German Forest, and Germanic myths. The later German Romanticism of, for example E. T. A. Hoffmann's Der Sandmann (The Sandman), 1817, and Joseph Freiherr von Eichendorff's Das Marmorbild (The Marble Statue), 1819, was darker in its motifs and has gothic elements. The significance to Romanticism of childhood innocence, the importance of imagination, and racial theories all combined to give an unprecedented importance to folk literature, non-classical mythology and children's literature, above all in Germany. Brentano and von Arnim were significant literary figures who together published Des Knaben Wunderhorn ("The Boy's Magic Horn" or cornucopia), a collection of versified folk tales, in 1806–08. The first collection of Grimms' Fairy Tales by the Brothers Grimm was published in 1812. Unlike the much later work of Hans Christian Andersen, who was publishing his invented tales in Danish from 1835, these German works were at least mainly based on collected folk tales, and the Grimms remained true to the style of the telling in their early editions, though later rewriting some parts. One of the brothers, Jacob, published in 1835 Deutsche Mythologie, a long academic work on Germanic mythology. Another strain is exemplified by Schiller's highly emotional language and the depiction of physical violence in his play The Robbers of 1781.

== Great Britain ==
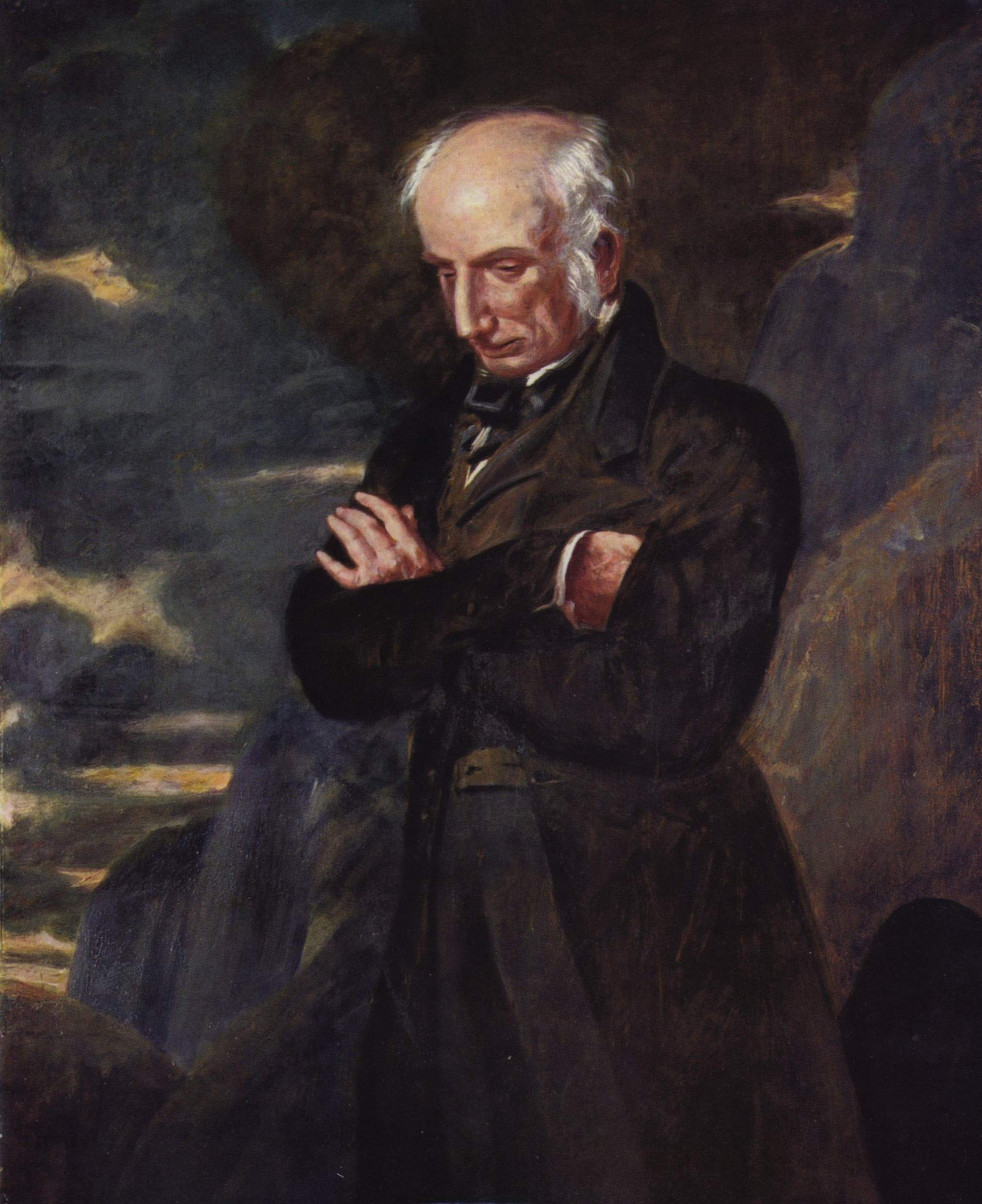
William Wordsworth (pictured) and Samuel Taylor Coleridge helped to launch the Romantic Age in English literature in 1798 with their joint publication Lyrical Ballads

In English literature, the key figures of the Romantic movement are considered to be the group of poets including William Wordsworth, Samuel Taylor Coleridge, John Keats, Lord Byron, Percy Bysshe Shelley and the much older William Blake, followed later by the isolated figure of John Clare; also such novelists as Walter Scott from Scotland and Mary Shelley, and the essayists William Hazlitt and Charles Lamb. The publication in 1798 of Lyrical Ballads, with many of the finest poems by Wordsworth and Coleridge, is often held to mark the start of the movement. The majority of the poems were by Wordsworth, and many dealt with the lives of the poor in his native Lake District, or his feelings about nature—which he more fully developed in his long poem The Prelude, never published in his lifetime. The longest poem in the volume was Coleridge's The Rime of the Ancient Mariner, which showed the Gothic side of English Romanticism, and the exotic settings that many works featured. In the period when they were writing, the Lake Poets were widely regarded as a marginal group of radicals, though they were supported by the critic and writer William Hazlitt and others.

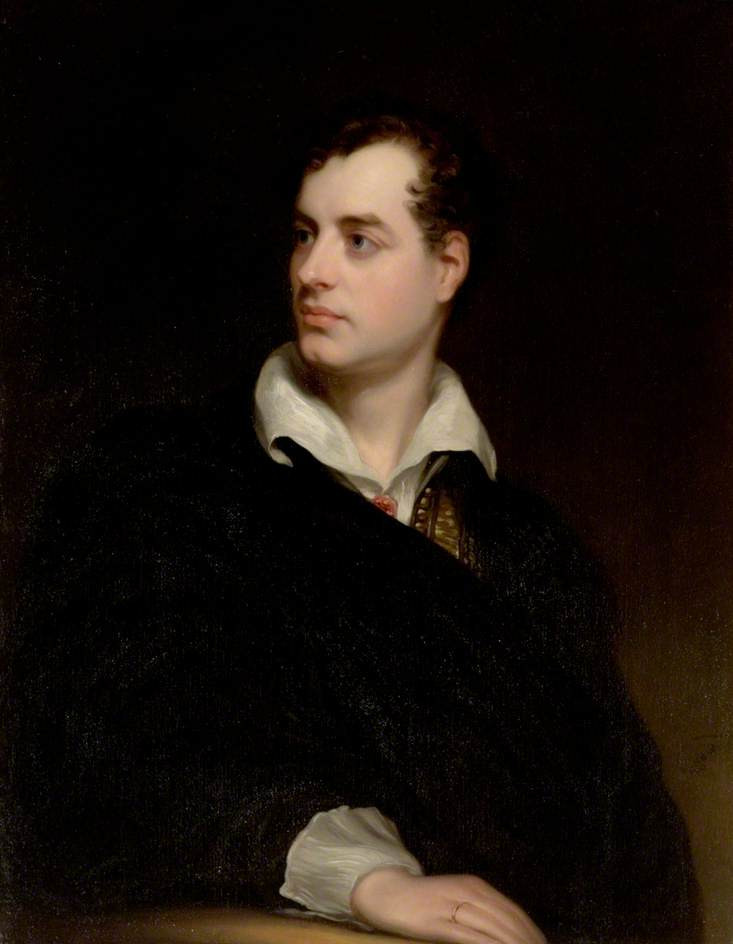
Portrait of Lord Byron by Thomas Phillips, c. 1814. The Byronic hero first reached the wider public in Byron's semi-autobiographical epic narrative poem Childe Harold's Pilgrimage (1812–1818).

In contrast, Lord Byron and Walter Scott achieved enormous fame and influence throughout Europe with works exploiting the violence and drama of their exotic and historical settings; Goethe called Byron "undoubtedly the greatest genius of our century". Scott achieved immediate success with his long narrative poem The Lay of the Last Minstrel in 1805, followed by the full epic poem Marmion in 1808. Both were set in the distant Scottish past, already evoked in Ossian; Romanticism and Scotland were to have a long and fruitful partnership. Byron had equal success with the first part of Childe Harold's Pilgrimage in 1812, followed by four "Turkish tales", all in the form of long poems, starting with The Giaour in 1813, drawing from his Grand Tour, which had reached Ottoman Europe, and orientalizing the themes of the Gothic novel in verse. These featured different variations of the "Byronic hero", and his own life contributed a further version. Scott meanwhile was effectively inventing the historical novel, beginning in 1814 with Waverley, set in the 1745 Jacobite rising, which was a highly profitable success, followed by over 20 further Waverley Novels over the next 17 years, with settings going back to the Crusades that he had researched to a degree that was new in literature.

In contrast to Germany, Romanticism in English literature had little connection with nationalism, and the Romantics were often regarded with suspicion for the sympathy many felt for the ideals of the French Revolution, whose collapse and replacement with the dictatorship of Napoleon was, as elsewhere in Europe, a shock to the movement. Though his novels celebrated Scottish identity and history, Scott was politically a firm Unionist, but admitted to Jacobite sympathies. Several Romantics spent much time abroad, and a famous stay on Lake Geneva with Byron and Shelley in 1816 produced the hugely influential novel Frankenstein by Shelley's wife-to-be Mary Shelley and the novella The Vampyre by Byron's doctor John William Polidori. The lyrics of Robert Burns in Scotland, and Thomas Moore from Ireland, reflected in different ways their countries and the Romantic interest in folk literature, but neither had a fully Romantic approach to life or their work.

Though they have modern critical champions such as György Lukács, Scott's novels are today more likely to be experienced in the form of the many operas that composers continued to base on them over the following decades, such as Donizetti's Lucia di Lammermoor and Vincenzo Bellini's I puritani (both 1835). Byron is now most highly regarded for his short lyrics and his generally unromantic prose writings, especially his letters, and his unfinished satire Don Juan. Unlike many Romantics, Byron's widely publicised personal life appeared to match his work, and his death at 36 in 1824 from disease when helping the Greek War of Independence appeared from a distance to be a suitably Romantic end, entrenching his legend. Keats in 1821 and Shelley in 1822 both died in Italy, Blake (at almost 70) in 1827, and Coleridge largely ceased to write in the 1820s. Wordsworth was by 1820 respectable and highly regarded, holding a government sinecure, but wrote relatively little. In the discussion of English literature, the Romantic period is often regarded as finishing around the 1820s, or sometimes even earlier, although many authors of the succeeding decades were no less committed to Romantic values.

The most significant novelist in English during the peak Romantic period, other than Walter Scott, was Jane Austen, whose essentially conservative world-view had little in common with her Romantic contemporaries, retaining a strong belief in decorum and social rules, though critics such as Claudia L. Johnson have detected tremors under the surface of many works, such as Northanger Abbey (1817), Mansfield Park (1814) and Persuasion (1817). But around the mid-century the undoubtedly Romantic novels of the Yorkshire-based Brontë family appeared, most notably Charlotte's Jane Eyre and Emily's Wuthering Heights, both published in 1847, which also introduced more Gothic themes. While these two novels were written and published after the Romantic period is said to have ended, their novels were heavily influenced by Romantic literature they had read as children.

Byron, Keats, and Shelley all wrote for the stage, but with little success in England, with Shelley's The Cenci perhaps the best work produced, though that was not played in a public theatre in England until a century after his death. Byron's plays, along with dramatizations of his poems and Scott's novels, were much more popular on the Continent, and especially in France, and through these versions several were turned into operas, many still performed today. If contemporary poets had little success on the stage, the period was a legendary one for performances of Shakespeare, and went some way to restoring his original texts and removing the Augustan "improvements" to them. The greatest actor of the period, Edmund Kean, restored the tragic ending to King Lear; Coleridge said that "Seeing him act was like reading Shakespeare by flashes of lightning."

=== Scotland ===
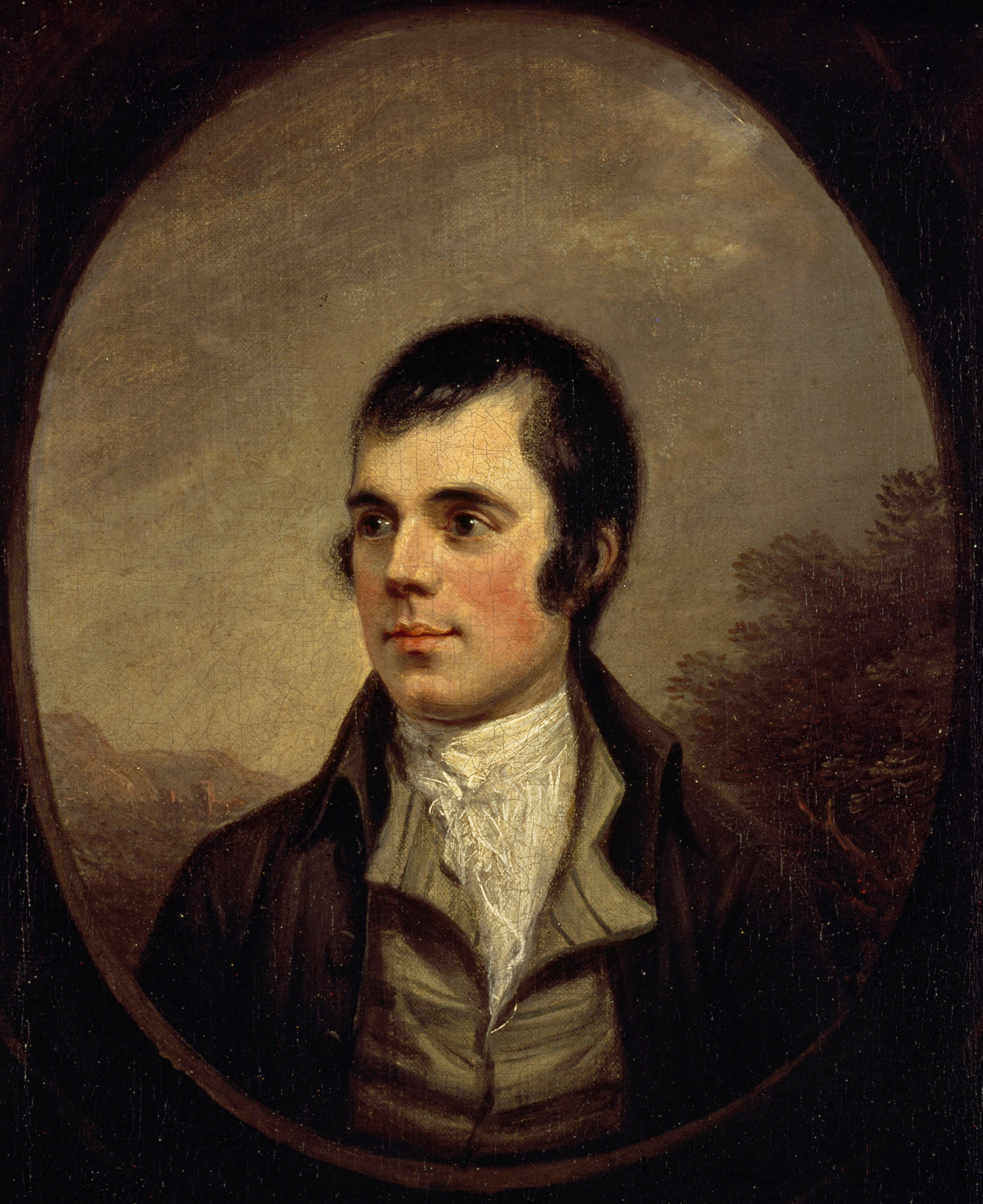
Robert Burns in Alexander Nasmyth's portrait of 1787

Although after union with England in 1707 Scotland increasingly adopted English language and wider cultural norms, its literature developed a distinct national identity and began to enjoy an international reputation. Allan Ramsay (1686–1758) laid the foundations of a reawakening of interest in older Scottish literature, as well as leading the trend for pastoral poetry, helping to develop the Habbie stanza as a poetic form. James Macpherson (1736–1796) was the first Scottish poet to gain an international reputation. Claiming to have found poetry written by the ancient bard Ossian, he published translations that acquired international popularity, being proclaimed as a Celtic equivalent of the Classical epics. Fingal, written in 1762, was speedily translated into many European languages, and its appreciation of natural beauty and treatment of the ancient legend has been credited more than any single work with bringing about the Romantic movement in European, and especially in German literature, through its influence on Johann Gottfried von Herder and Johann Wolfgang von Goethe. It was also popularised in France by figures that included Napoleon. Eventually it became clear that the poems were not direct translations from Scottish Gaelic, but flowery adaptations made to suit the aesthetic expectations of his audience.

Robert Burns (1759–96) and Walter Scott (1771–1832) were highly influenced by the Ossian cycle. Burns, an Ayrshire poet and lyricist, is widely regarded as the national poet of Scotland and a major influence on the Romantic movement. His poem (and song) "Auld Lang Syne" is often sung at Hogmanay (the last day of the year), and "Scots Wha Hae" served for a long time as an unofficial national anthem of the country. Scott began as a poet and also collected and published Scottish ballads. His first prose work, Waverley in 1814, is often called the first historical novel. It launched a highly successful career, with other historical novels such as Rob Roy (1817), The Heart of Midlothian (1818) and Ivanhoe (1820). Scott probably did more than any other figure to define and popularise Scottish cultural identity in the nineteenth century. Other major literary figures connected with Romanticism include the poets and novelists James Hogg (1770–1835), Allan Cunningham (1784–1842) and John Galt (1779–1839).

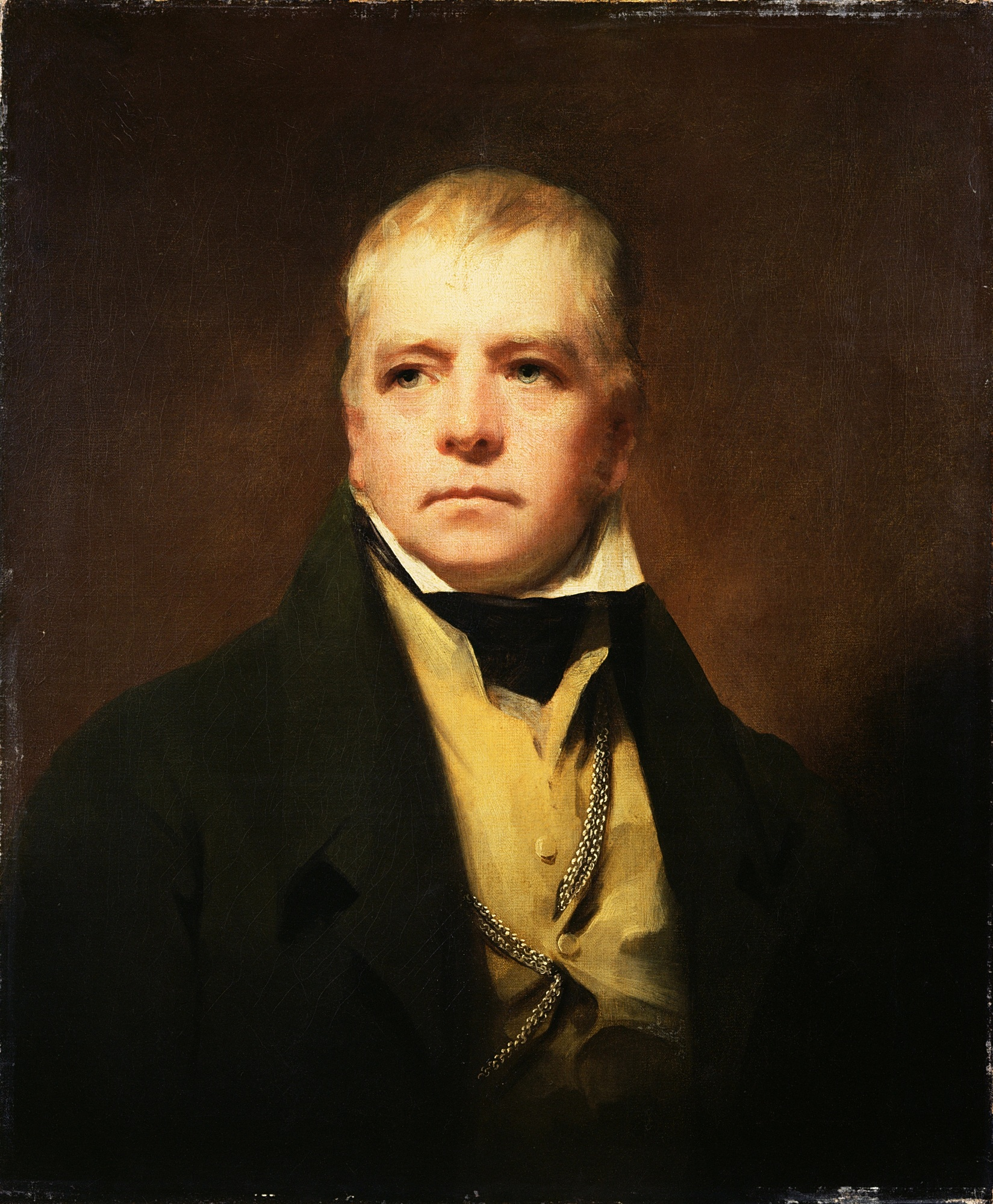
Raeburn's portrait of Walter Scott in 1822

Scotland was also the location of two of the most important literary magazines of the era, The Edinburgh Review (founded in 1802) and Blackwood's Magazine (founded in 1817), which had a major impact on the development of British literature and drama in the era of Romanticism. Ian Duncan and Alex Benchimol suggest that publications like the novels of Scott and these magazines were part of a highly dynamic Scottish Romanticism that by the early nineteenth century, caused Edinburgh to emerge as the cultural capital of Britain and become central to a wider formation of a "British Isles nationalism".

Scottish "national drama" emerged in the early 1800s, as plays with specifically Scottish themes began to dominate the Scottish stage. Theatres had been discouraged by the Church of Scotland and fears of Jacobite assemblies. In the later eighteenth century, many plays were written for and performed by small amateur companies and were not published and so most have been lost. Towards the end of the century there were "closet dramas", primarily designed to be read, rather than performed, including work by Scott, Hogg, Galt and Joanna Baillie (1762–1851), often influenced by the ballad tradition and Gothic Romanticism.

== France ==
Romanticism was relatively late in developing in French literature, more so than in the visual arts. The 18th-century precursor to Romanticism, the cult of sensibility, had become associated with the Ancien Régime, and the French Revolution had been more of an inspiration to foreign writers than those experiencing it at first-hand. The first major figure was François-René de Chateaubriand, an aristocrat who had remained a royalist throughout the Revolution, and returned to France from exile in England and America under Napoleon, with whose regime he had an uneasy relationship. His writings, all in prose, included some fiction, such as his influential novella of exile René (1802), which anticipated Byron in its alienated hero, but mostly contemporary history and politics, his travels, a defence of religion and the medieval spirit (Génie du christianisme, 1802), and finally in the 1830s and 1840s his enormous autobiography Mémoires d'Outre-Tombe ("Memoirs from beyond the grave").

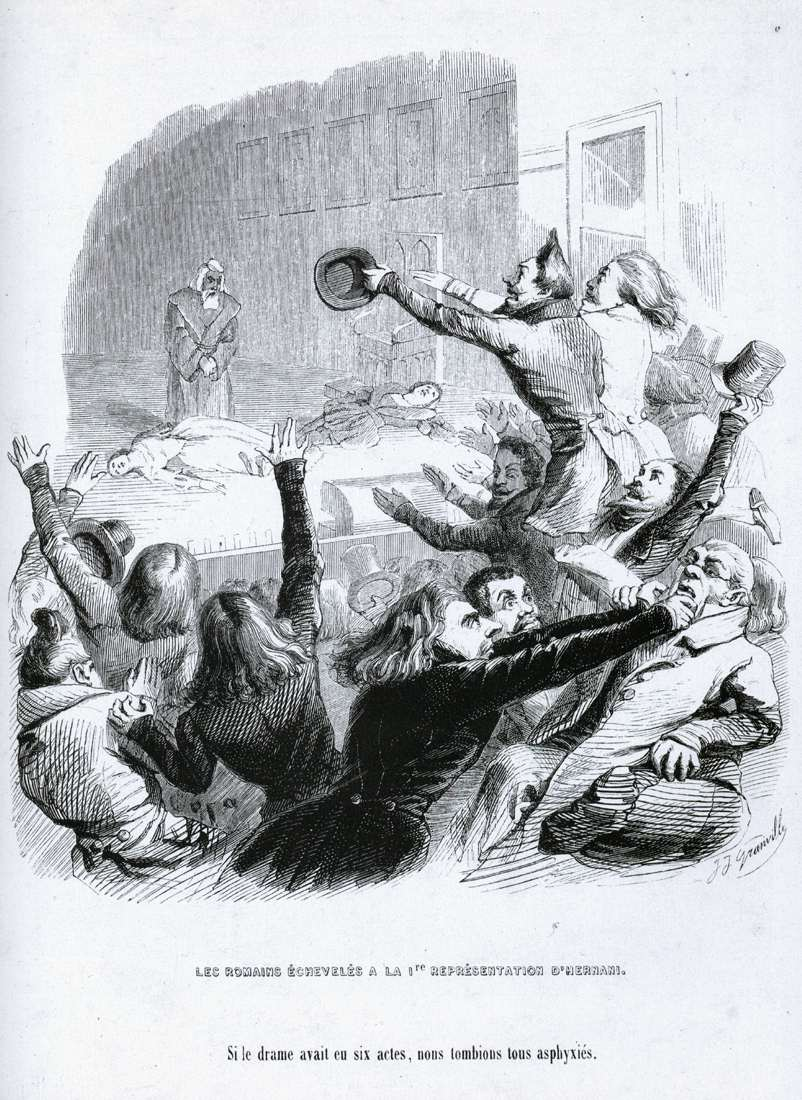
The "battle of Hernani" was fought nightly at the theatre in 1830: lithograph, by J. J. Grandville

After the Bourbon Restoration, French Romanticism developed in the lively world of Parisian theatre, with productions of Shakespeare, Schiller (in France a key Romantic author), and adaptations of Scott and Byron alongside French authors, several of whom began to write in the late 1820s. Cliques of pro- and anti-Romantics developed, and productions were often accompanied by raucous vocalizing by the two sides, including the shouted assertion by one theatregoer in 1822 that "Shakespeare, c'est l'aide-de-camp de Wellington" ("Shakespeare is Wellington's aide-de-camp"). Alexandre Dumas began as a dramatist, with a series of successes beginning with Henri III et sa cour (1829) before turning to novels that were mostly historical adventures somewhat in the manner of Scott, most famously The Three Musketeers and The Count of Monte Cristo, both of 1844. Victor Hugo published as a poet in the 1820s before achieving success on the stage with Hernani—a historical drama in a quasi-Shakespearean style that had famously riotous performances on its first run in 1830. Like Dumas, Hugo is best known for his novels, and was already writing The Hunchback of Notre-Dame (1831), one of the best known works, which became a paradigm of the French Romantic movement. The preface to his unperformed play Cromwell gives an important manifesto of French Romanticism, stating that "there are no rules, or models". The career of Prosper Mérimée followed a similar pattern; he is now best known as the originator of the story of Carmen, with his novella published 1845. Alfred de Vigny remains best known as a dramatist, with his play on the life of the English poet Chatterton (1835) perhaps his best work. George Sand was a central figure of the Parisian literary scene, famous both for her novels and criticism and her affairs with Chopin and several others; she too was inspired by the theatre, and wrote works to be staged at her private estate.

French Romantic poets of the 1830s to 1850s include Alfred de Musset, Gérard de Nerval, Alphonse de Lamartine and the flamboyant Théophile Gautier, whose prolific output in various forms continued until his death in 1872.

Stendhal is today probably the most highly regarded French novelist of the period, but he stands in a complex relation with Romanticism, and is notable for his penetrating psychological insight into his characters and his realism, qualities rarely prominent in Romantic fiction. As a survivor of the French retreat from Moscow in 1812, fantasies of heroism and adventure had little appeal for him, and like Goya he is often seen as a forerunner of Realism. His most important works are Le Rouge et le Noir (The Red and the Black, 1830) and La Chartreuse de Parme (The Charterhouse of Parma, 1839).

== Poland ==
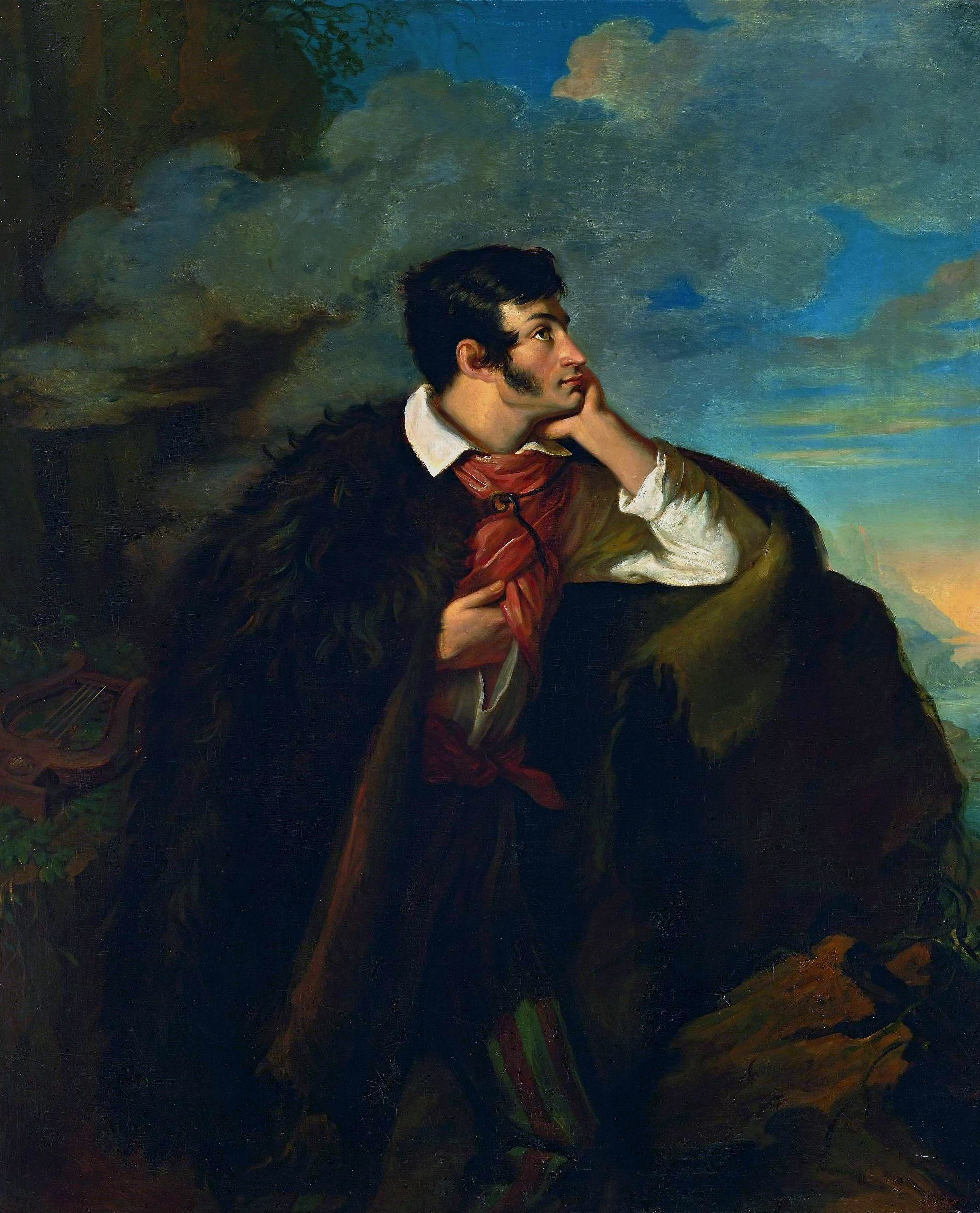
Adam Mickiewicz on the Ayu-Dag, by Walenty Wańkowicz, 1828

Romanticism in Poland is often taken to begin with the publication of Adam Mickiewicz's first poems in 1822, and end with the crushing of the January Uprising of 1863 against the Russians. It was strongly marked by interest in Polish history. Polish Romanticism revived the old "Sarmatism" traditions of the szlachta or Polish nobility. Old traditions and customs were revived and portrayed in a positive light in the Polish messianic movement and in works of great Polish poets such as Adam Mickiewicz (Pan Tadeusz), Juliusz Słowacki and Zygmunt Krasiński. This close connection between Polish Romanticism and Polish history became one of the defining qualities of the literature of Polish Romanticism period, differentiating it from that of other countries. They had not suffered the loss of national statehood as was the case with Poland. Influenced by the general spirit and main ideas of European Romanticism, the literature of Polish Romanticism is unique, as many scholars have pointed out, in having developed largely outside of Poland and in its emphatic focus upon the issue of Polish nationalism. The Polish intelligentsia, along with leading members of its government, left Poland in the early 1830s, during what is referred to as the "Great Emigration", resettling in France, Germany, Great Britain, Turkey, and the United States.

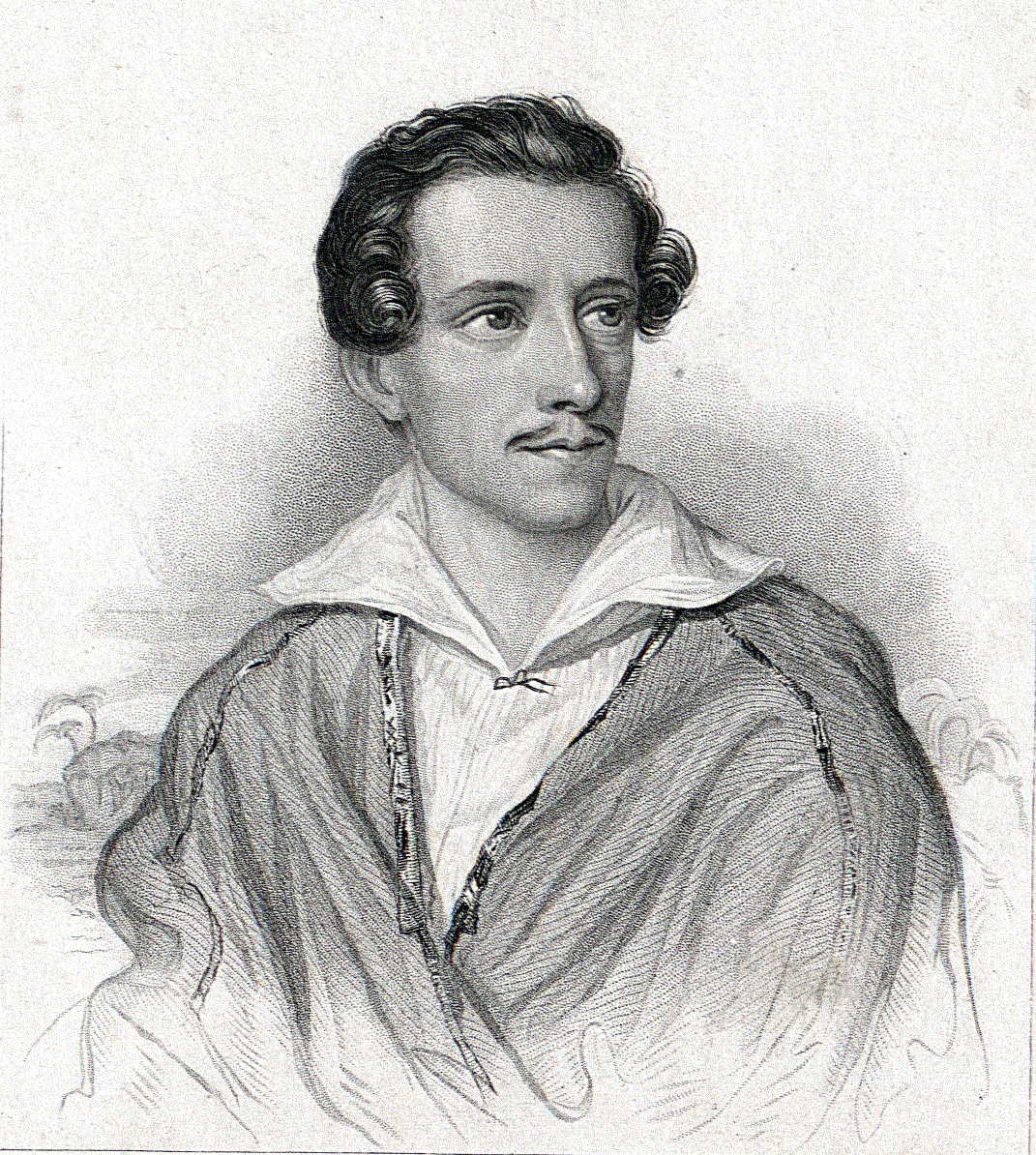
Juliusz Słowacki, a Polish poet considered one of the "Three National Bards" of Polish literature—a major figure in the Polish Romantic period, and the father of modern Polish drama.

Their art featured emotionalism and irrationality, fantasy and imagination, personality cults, folklore and country life, and the propagation of ideals of freedom. In the second period, many of the Polish Romantics worked abroad, often banished from Poland by the occupying powers due to their politically subversive ideas. Their work became increasingly dominated by the ideals of political struggle for freedom and their country's sovereignty. Elements of mysticism became more prominent. There developed the idea of the poeta wieszcz (the prophet). The wieszcz (bard) functioned as spiritual leader to the nation fighting for its independence. The most notable poet so recognized was Adam Mickiewicz.

Zygmunt Krasiński also wrote to inspire political and religious hope in his countrymen. Unlike his predecessors, who called for victory at whatever price in Poland's struggle against Russia, Krasinski emphasized Poland's spiritual role in its fight for independence, advocating an intellectual rather than a military superiority. His works best exemplify the Messianic movement in Poland: in two early dramas, Nie-boska komedia (1835; The Undivine Comedy) and Irydion (1836; Iridion), as well as in the later Psalmy przyszłości (1845), he asserted that Poland was the Christ of Europe: specifically chosen by God to carry the world's burdens, to suffer, and eventually be resurrected.

== Russia ==
Early Russian Romanticism is associated with the writers Konstantin Batyushkov (A Vision on the Shores of the Lethe, 1809), Vasily Zhukovsky (The Bard, 1811; Svetlana, 1813) and Nikolay Karamzin (Poor Liza, 1792; Julia, 1796; Martha the Mayoress, 1802; The Sensitive and the Cold, 1803). However the principal exponent of Romanticism in Russia is Alexander Pushkin (The Prisoner of the Caucasus, 1820–1821; The Robber Brothers, 1822; Ruslan and Ludmila, 1820; Eugene Onegin, 1825–1832). Pushkin's work influenced many writers in the 19th century and led to his eventual recognition as Russia's greatest poet. Other Russian Romantic poets include Mikhail Lermontov (A Hero of Our Time, 1839), Fyodor Tyutchev (Silentium!, 1830), Yevgeny Baratynsky (Eda, 1826), Anton Delvig, and Wilhelm Küchelbecker.

Influenced heavily by Lord Byron, Lermontov sought to explore the Romantic emphasis on metaphysical discontent with society and self, while Tyutchev's poems often described scenes of nature or passions of love. Tyutchev commonly operated with such categories as night and day, north and south, dream and reality, cosmos and chaos, and the still world of winter and spring teeming with life. Baratynsky's style was fairly classical in nature, dwelling on the models of the previous century.

== Spain ==
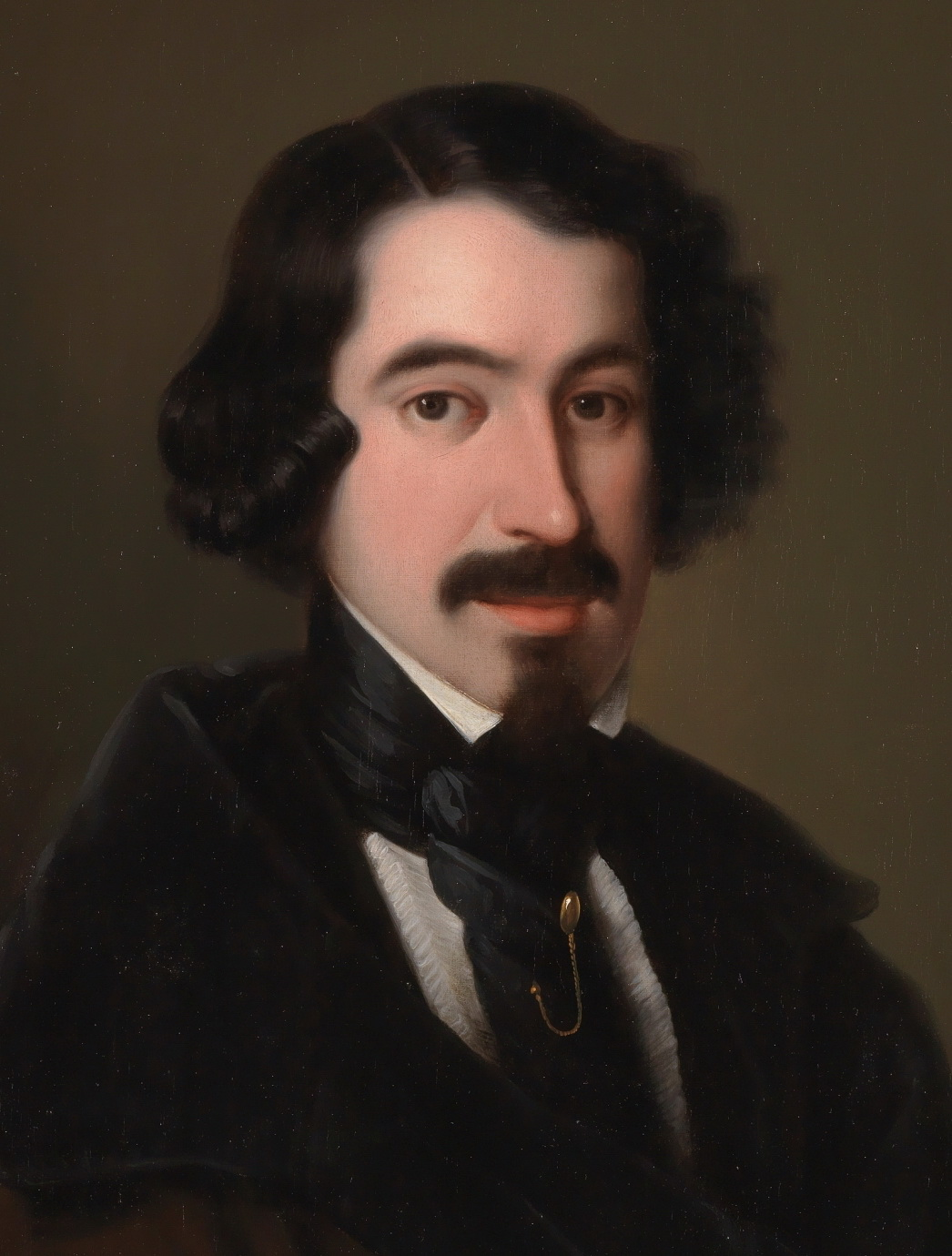
El escritor José de Espronceda, portrait by Antonio María Esquivel (c. 1845) (Museo del Prado, Madrid)

Romanticism in Spanish literature developed a well-known literature with a huge variety of poets and playwrights. The most important Spanish poet during this movement was José de Espronceda. After him there were other poets like Gustavo Adolfo Bécquer, Mariano José de Larra and the dramatists Ángel de Saavedra and José Zorrilla, author of Don Juan Tenorio. Before them may be mentioned the pre-romantics José Cadalso and Manuel José Quintana. The plays of Antonio García Gutiérrez were adapted to produce Giuseppe Verdi's operas Il trovatore and Simon Boccanegra. Spanish Romanticism also influenced regional literatures. For example, in Catalonia and in Galicia there was a national boom of writers in the local languages, like the Catalan Jacint Verdaguer and the Galician Rosalía de Castro, the main figures of the national revivalist movements Renaixença and Rexurdimento, respectively.

There are scholars who consider Spanish Romanticism to be Proto-Existentialism because it is more anguished than the movement in other European countries. Foster et al., for example, say that the work of Spain's writers such as Espronceda, Larra, and other writers in the 19th century demonstrated a "metaphysical crisis". These observers put more weight on the link between the 19th-century Spanish writers with the existentialist movement that emerged immediately after. According to Richard Caldwell, the writers that we now identify with Spain's romanticism were actually precursors to those who galvanized the literary movement that emerged in the 1920s. This notion is the subject of debate for there are authors who stress that Spain's romanticism is one of the earliest in Europe, while some assert that Spain really had no period of literary romanticism. This controversy underscores a certain uniqueness to Spanish Romanticism in comparison to its European counterparts.

== Portugal ==
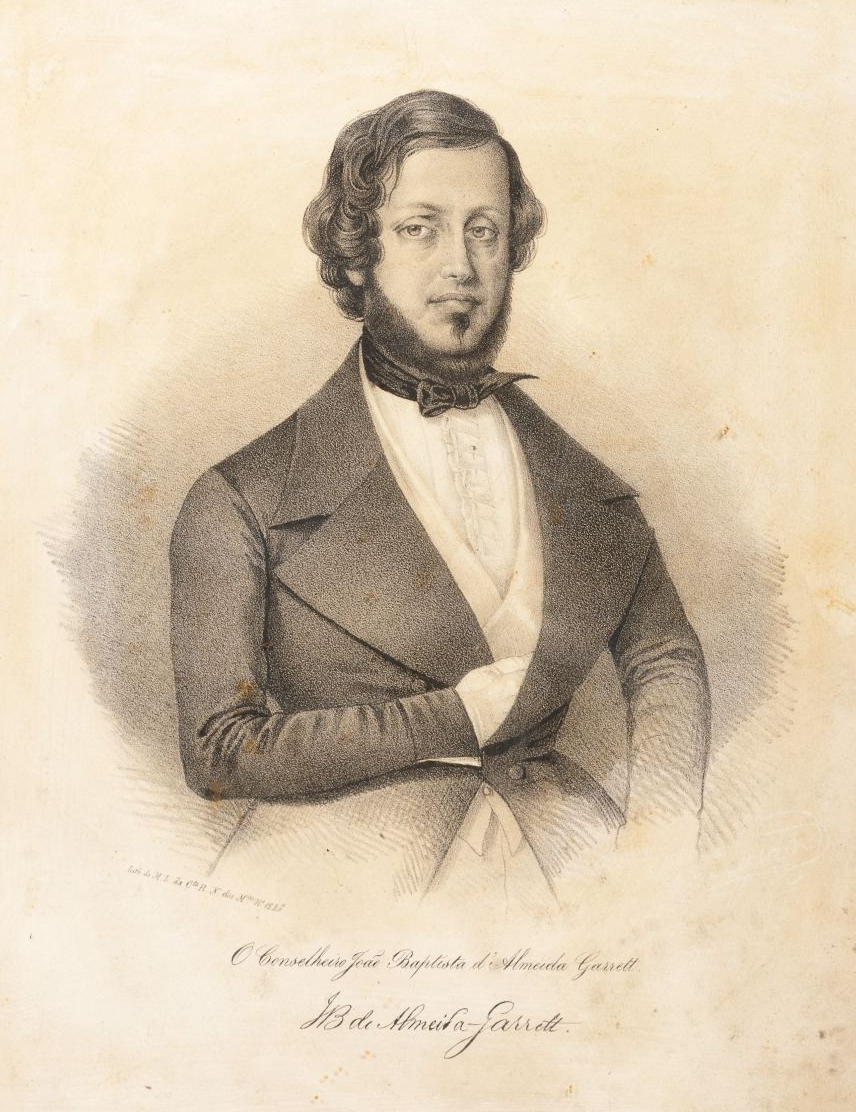
Portuguese poet, novelist, politician and playwright Almeida Garrett (1799–1854)

Romanticism began in Portugal with the publication of the poem Camões (1825), by Almeida Garrett, who was raised by his uncle D. Alexandre, bishop of Angra, in the precepts of Neoclassicism, which can be observed in his early work. The author himself confesses (in Camões' preface) that he voluntarily refused to follow the principles of epic poetry enunciated by Aristotle in his Poetics, as he did the same to Horace's Ars Poetica. Almeida Garrett had participated in the 1820 Liberal Revolution, which caused him to exile himself in England in 1823 and then in France, after the Vila-Francada. While living in Great Britain, he had contacts with the Romantic movement and read authors such as Shakespeare, Scott, Ossian, Byron, Hugo, Lamartine and de Staël, at the same time visiting feudal castles and ruins of Gothic churches and abbeys, which would be reflected in his writings. In 1838, he presented Um Auto de Gil Vicente ("A Play by Gil Vicente"), in an attempt to create a new national theatre, free of Greco-Roman and foreign influence. But his masterpiece would be Frei Luís de Sousa (1843), named by himself as a "Romantic drama" and it was acclaimed as an exceptional work, dealing with themes as national independence, faith, justice and love. He was also deeply interested in Portuguese folkloric verse, which resulted in the publication of Romanceiro ("Traditional Portuguese Ballads") (1843), that recollect a great number of ancient popular ballads, known as "romances" or "rimances", in redondilha maior verse form, that contained stories of chivalry, life of saints, crusades, courtly love, etc. He wrote the novels Viagens na Minha Terra, O Arco de Sant'Ana and Helena.

Alexandre Herculano is, alongside Almeida Garrett, one of the founders of Portuguese Romanticism. He too was forced to exile to Great Britain and France because of his liberal ideals. All of his poetry and prose are (unlike Almeida Garrett's) entirely Romantic, rejecting Greco-Roman myth and history. He sought inspiration in medieval Portuguese poems and chronicles as in the Bible. His output is vast and covers many different genres, such as historical essays, poetry, novels, opuscules and theatre, where he brings back a whole world of Portuguese legends, tradition and history, especially in Eurico, o Presbítero ("Eurico, the Priest") and Lendas e Narrativas ("Legends and Narratives"). His work was influenced by Chateaubriand, Schiller, Klopstock, Walter Scott and the Old Testament Psalms.

António Feliciano de Castilho made the case for Ultra-Romanticism, publishing the poems A Noite no Castelo ("Night in the Castle") and Os Ciúmes do Bardo ("The Jealousy of the Bard"), both in 1836, and the drama Camões. He became an unquestionable master for successive Ultra-Romantic generations, whose influence would not be challenged until the famous Coimbra Question. He also created polemics by translating Goethe's Faust without knowing German, but using French versions of the play. Other notable figures of Portuguese Romanticism are the famous novelists Camilo Castelo Branco and Júlio Dinis, and Soares de Passos, Bulhão Pato and Pinheiro Chagas.

Romantic style would be revived in the beginning of the 20th century, notably through the works of poets linked to the Portuguese Renaissance, such as Teixeira de Pascoais, Jaime Cortesão, Mário Beirão, among others, who can be considered Neo-Romantics. An early Portuguese expression of Romanticism is found already in poets such as Manuel Maria Barbosa du Bocage (especially in his sonnets dated at the end of the 18th century) and Leonor de Almeida Portugal, Marquise of Alorna.

== Italy ==
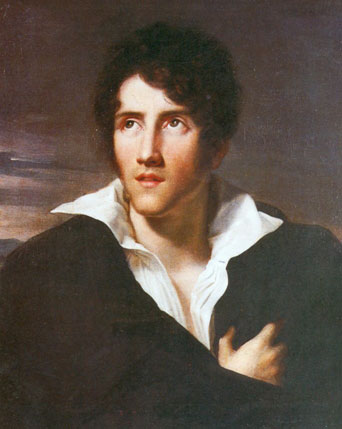
Alessandro Manzoni

Romanticism in Italian literature was a minor movement although some important works were produced, also linked to patriotic themes that aspired to national unity. It began officially in 1816 when Germaine de Staël wrote an article in the journal Biblioteca italiana called "On the manner and utility of translations", inviting Italian people to reject Neoclassicism and to study new authors from other countries. Before that date, Ugo Foscolo had already published poems anticipating Romantic themes, and so had classicistic Monti and Pindemonte. The most important Romantic writers were Ludovico di Breme, Pietro Borsieri and Giovanni Berchet. Better known authors such as Alessandro Manzoni and Giacomo Leopardi were influenced by Enlightenment as well as by Romanticism and Classicism.

An minor Italian romanticist writer who produced works in various genres, including short stories and novels (such as Ricciarda o i Nurra e i Cabras), was the Piedmontese Giuseppe Botero (1815–1885), devoting much of his career to Sardinian literature.

== South America ==
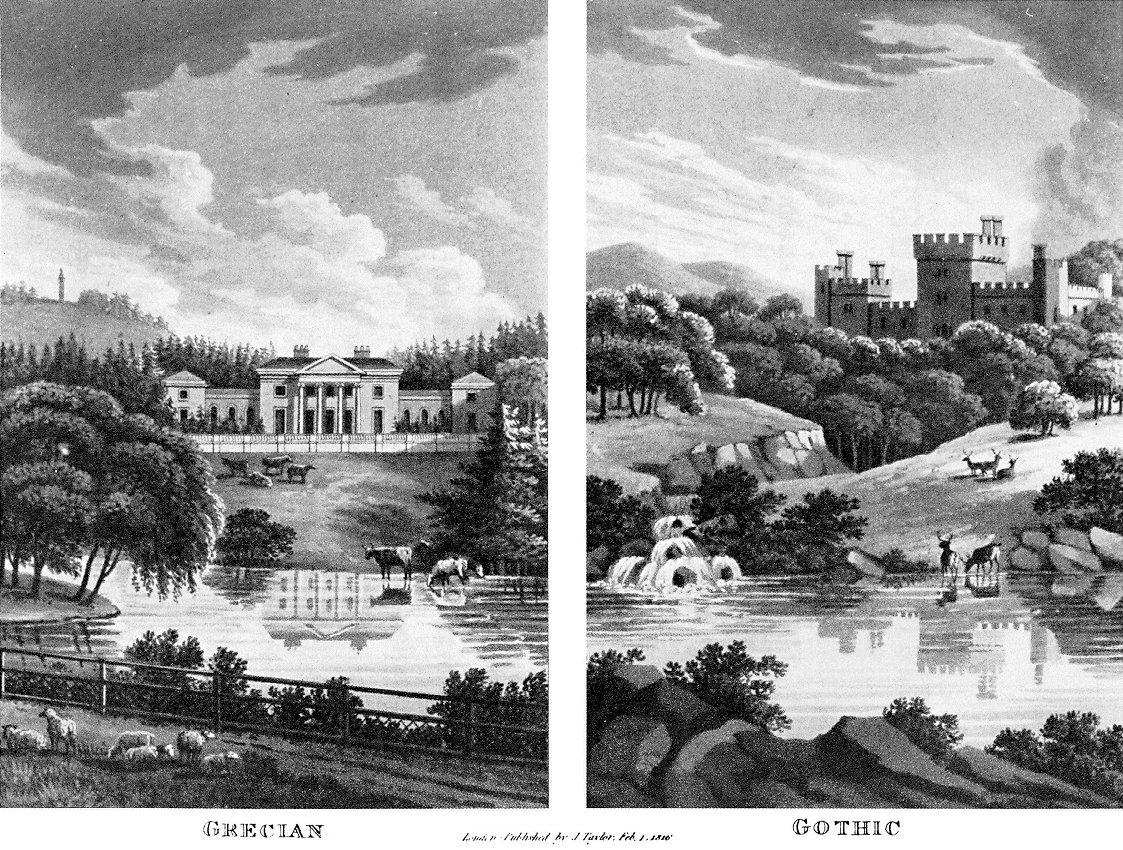
A print exemplifying the contrast between neoclassical vs. romantic styles of landscape and architecture (or the "Grecian" and the "Gothic" as they are termed here), 1816

Spanish-speaking South American Romanticism was influenced heavily by Esteban Echeverría, who wrote in the 1830s and 1840s. His writings were influenced by his hatred for the Argentine dictator Juan Manuel de Rosas, and filled with themes of blood and terror, using the metaphor of a slaughterhouse to portray the violence of Rosas' dictatorship.

Brazilian Romanticism is characterized and divided in three different periods. The first one is basically focused on the creation of a sense of national identity, using the ideal of the heroic Indian. Some examples include José de Alencar, who wrote Iracema and O Guarani, and Gonçalves Dias, renowned by the poem "Canção do exílio" (Song of the Exile). The second period, sometimes called Ultra-Romanticism, is marked by a profound influence of European themes and traditions, involving the melancholy, sadness and despair related to unobtainable love. Goethe and Lord Byron are commonly quoted in these works. Some of the most notable authors of this phase are Álvares de Azevedo, Casimiro de Abreu, Fagundes Varela and Junqueira Freire. The third cycle is marked by social poetry, especially the abolitionist movement, and it includes Castro Alves, Tobias Barreto and Pedro Luís Pereira de Sousa.

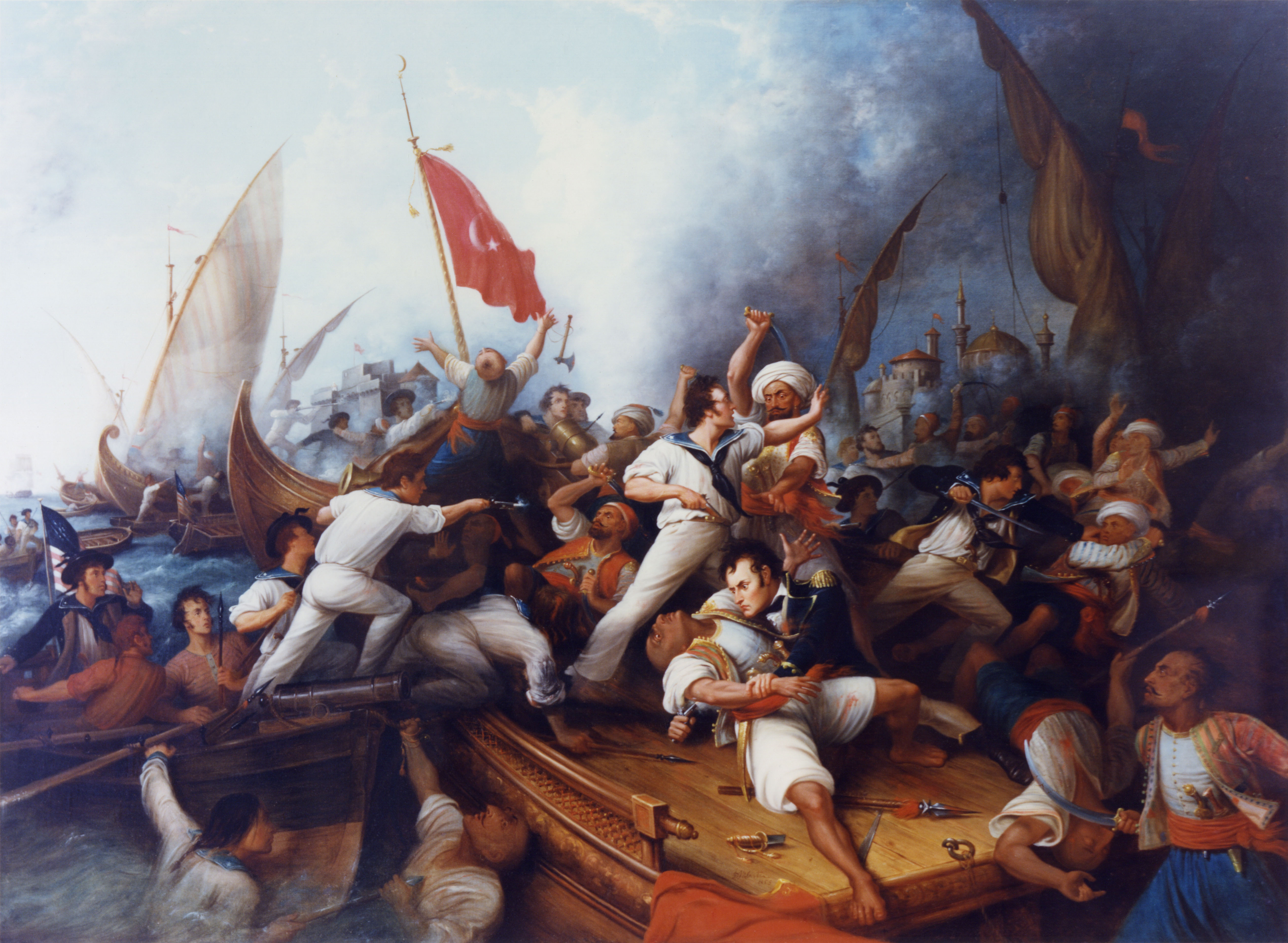
Dennis Malone Carter, Decatur Boarding the Tripolitan Gunboat, 1878. Romanticist vision of the Battle of Tripoli, during the First Barbary War. It represents the moment when the American war hero Stephen Decatur was fighting hand-to-hand against the Muslim pirate captain.

== United States ==
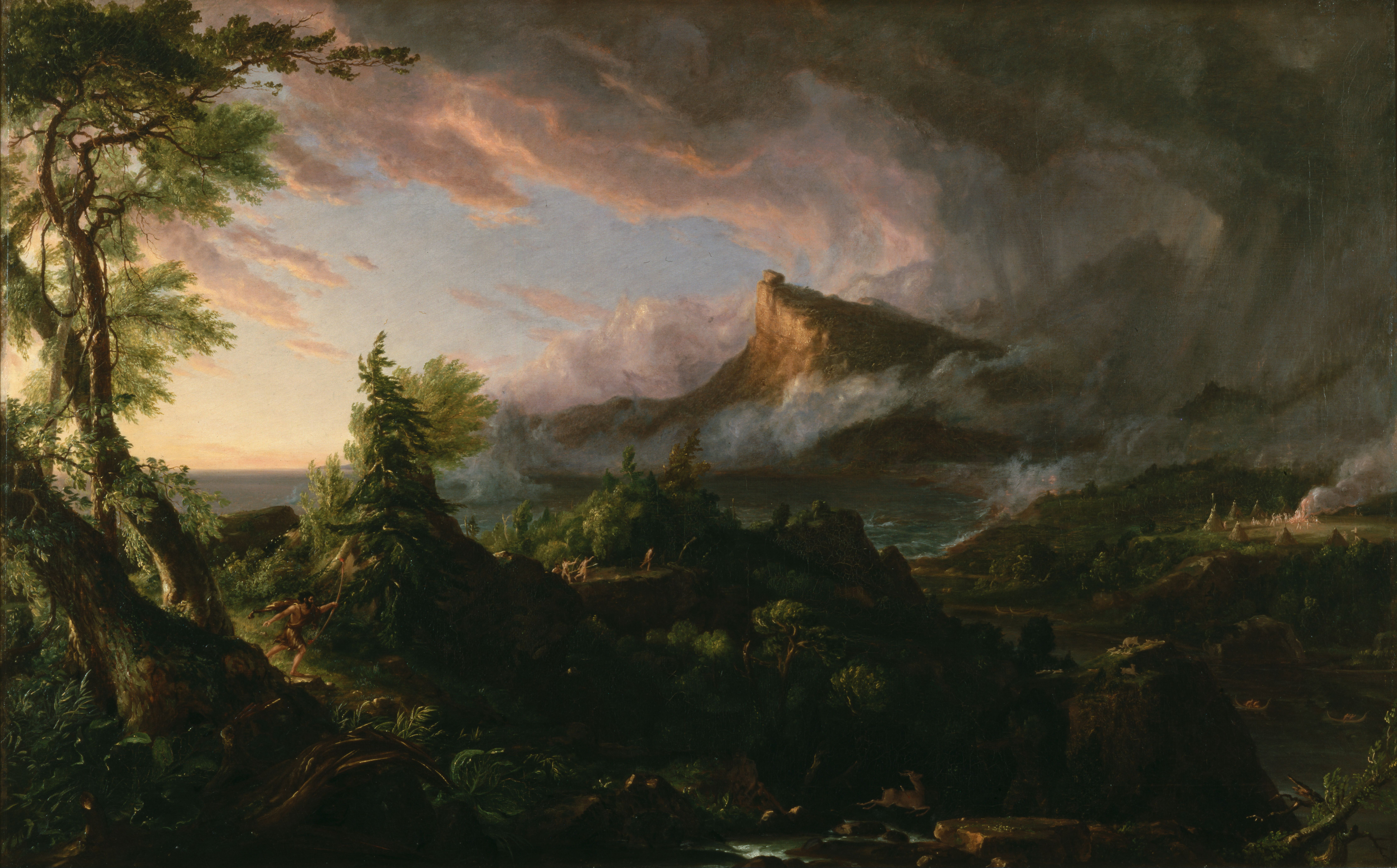
Thomas Cole, The Course of Empire: The Savage State (1 of 5), 1836

In the United States, at least by 1818 with William Cullen Bryant's "To a Waterfowl", Romantic poetry was being published. American Romantic Gothic literature made an early appearance with Washington Irving's "The Legend of Sleepy Hollow" (1820) and "Rip Van Winkle" (1819), followed from 1823 onwards by the Leatherstocking Tales of James Fenimore Cooper, with their emphasis on heroic simplicity and their fervent landscape descriptions of an already-exotic mythicized frontier peopled by "noble savages", similar to the philosophical theory of Rousseau, exemplified by Uncas, from The Last of the Mohicans. There are picturesque "local colour" elements in Washington Irving's essays and especially his travel books. Edgar Allan Poe's tales of the macabre and his balladic poetry were more influential in France than at home, but the romantic American novel developed fully with the atmosphere and drama of Nathaniel Hawthorne's The Scarlet Letter (1850). Later Transcendentalist writers such as Henry David Thoreau and Ralph Waldo Emerson still show elements of its influence and imagination, as does the romantic realism of Walt Whitman. The poetry of Emily Dickinson—nearly unread in her own time—and Herman Melville's novel Moby-Dick can be taken as epitomes of American Romantic literature. By the 1880s, however, psychological and social realism were competing with Romanticism in the novel.

=== European influence ===
The European Romantic movement reached America in the early 19th century. American Romanticism was just as multifaceted and individualistic as it was in Europe. Like the Europeans, the American Romantics demonstrated a high level of moral enthusiasm, commitment to individualism and the unfolding of the self, an emphasis on intuitive perception, and the assumption that the natural world was inherently good, while human society was filled with corruption.

Romanticism became popular in American politics, philosophy and art. The movement appealed to the revolutionary spirit of America as well as to those longing to break free of the strict religious traditions of early settlement. The Romantics rejected rationalism and religious intellect. It appealed to those in opposition of Calvinism, which includes the belief that the destiny of each individual is preordained. The Romantic movement gave rise to New England Transcendentalism, which portrayed a less restrictive relationship between God and Universe. The new philosophy presented the individual with a more personal relationship with God. Transcendentalism and Romanticism appealed to Americans in a similar fashion, for both privileged feeling over reason, individual freedom of expression over the restraints of tradition and custom. It often involved a rapturous response to nature. It encouraged the rejection of harsh, rigid Calvinism, and promised a new blossoming of American culture.

American Romanticism embraced the individual and rebelled against the confinement of neoclassicism and religious tradition. The Romantic movement in America created a new literary genre that continues to influence American writers. Novels, short stories, and poems replaced the sermons and manifestos of yore. Romantic literature was personal, intense, and portrayed more emotion than ever seen in neoclassical literature. America's preoccupation with freedom became a great source of motivation for Romantic writers as many were delighted in free expression and emotion without so much fear of ridicule and controversy. They also put more effort into the psychological development of their characters, and the main characters typically displayed extremes of sensitivity and excitement.

The works of the Romantic Era also differed from preceding works in that they spoke to a wider audience, partly reflecting the greater distribution of books as costs came down during the period.
