= Antonio Cortón =

Spanish journalist and literary critic (1854-1913)

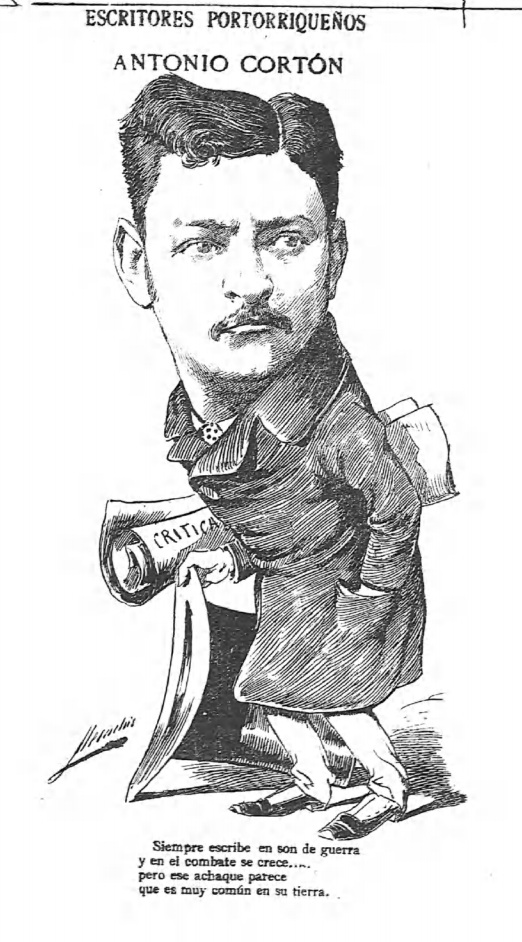
Caricature of Antonio Cortón, by Mecachis and published in Madrid Cómico in 1889

Antonio Cortón (May 29, 1854 in San Juan – September 6, 1913 in Madrid) was a Puerto Rican writer, journalist and literary critic. He traveled to and from Spain and was a newspaper editor for a Barcelona paper during the Spanish Restoration, after Spain lost Puerto Rico and other colonies in the Spanish–American War. He wrote Las Antillas, and the biography of José de Espronceda, a Spanish poet.

== Life and career ==
Born in San Juan, Puerto Rico on 29 May 1854, Cortón collaborated on newspaper publications such as: La Araña, Don Simplicio, El Progreso, La Razón, El Tribuno and El Buscapié and El Correo de Ultramar, and newspapers in Madrid such as El Globo, Revista Ilustrada and El Imparcial.

In 1879 he moved to Spain with his widowed mother.

In the March 1898 elections he obtained a deputy seat for Guayama and Mayagüez districts in Puerto Rico. By 1902, he was editor and interim director of the Barcelona edition of El Liberal and collaborated on La Vanguardia. He died in 1913 in Madrid.

== Works ==
- Las Antillas (1898), featuring the story of an adventurous young man who travels back to Las Antillas from Spain. Las Antillas were the islands of Cuba, Puerto Rico, Martinica, Santo Domingo, Haiti, Jamaica, Guadalupe, St. Thomas, and Trinidad.
- Pandemonium:crítica y sátira (1889)
- La separación de mandos en Puerto Rico
- La Literata (1883)
- Espronceda (1906), a biography of José de Espronceda.

== Bibliography ==
- Cortón, Antonio (1906). Espronceda (PDF). Madrid: La Última Moda.
- Llanas, Manuel (2012). "Verdaguer vist per Antonio Cortón". Anuari Verdaguer (20): 153–162. ISSN 1130-202X.
- Turc-Zinopoulos, Sylvie (2010). "La pluma arrancada a la mujer de letras en La literata. Agua fuerte (1883) de Antonio Corton. (Intento de lectura psicoanalítica)". Actas del XVI Congreso de la Asociación Internacional de Hispanistas: Nuevos caminos del hispanismo (PDF). Vol. 2. Iberoamericana. ISBN 978-84-8489-539-8.
