= Hélène Feillet =

French lithographer and painter (1812–1889)

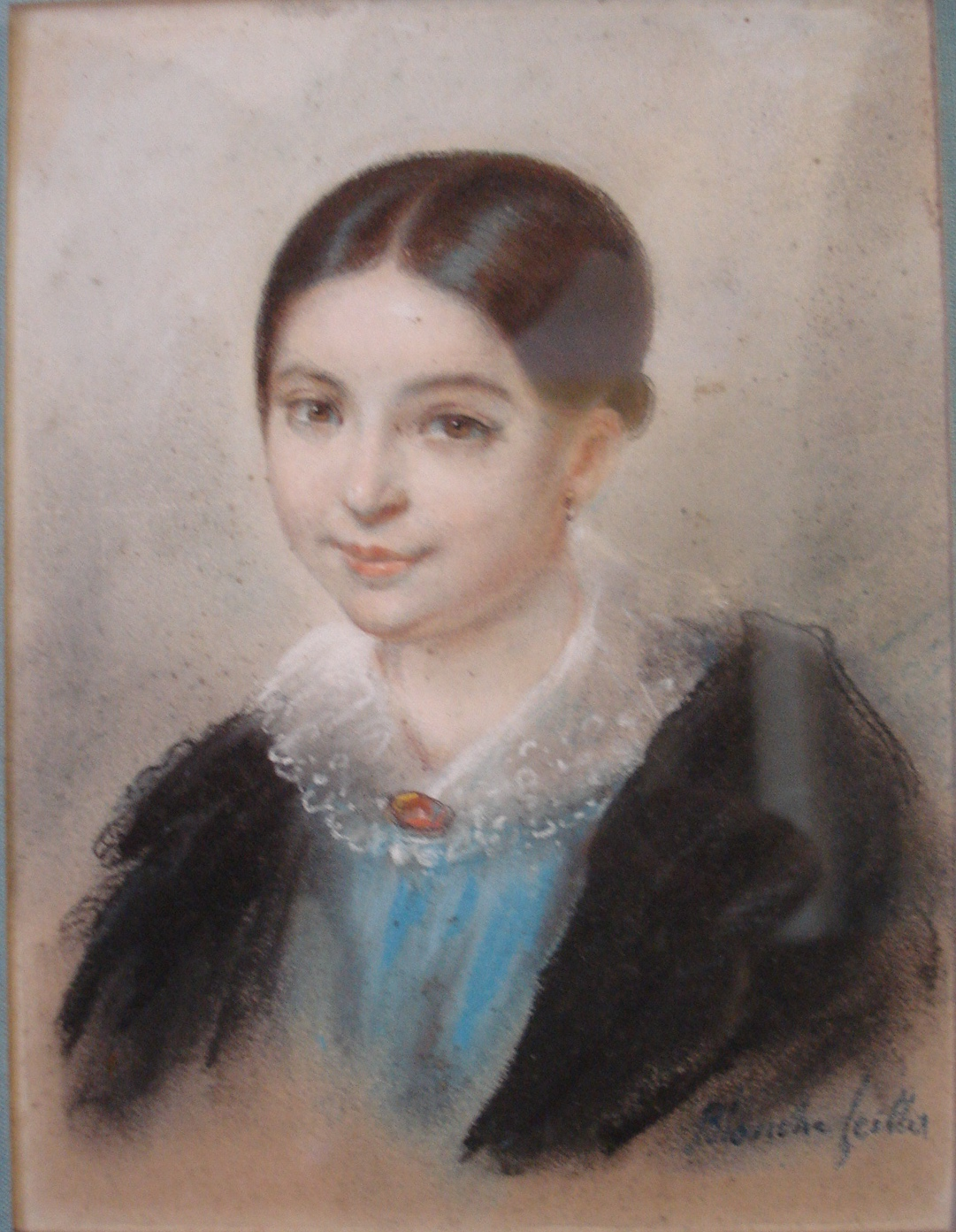
Hélène Feillet, painted by her sister Blanche

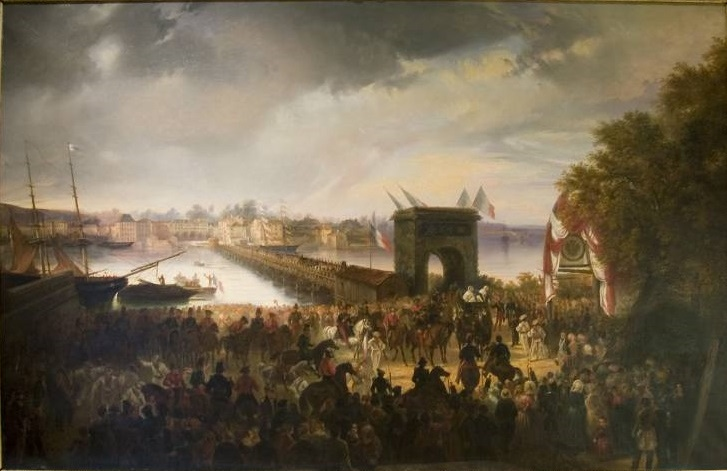
Arrival of the Duke and Duchess of Orleans in Bayonne (Hélèene Feillet, 1840)

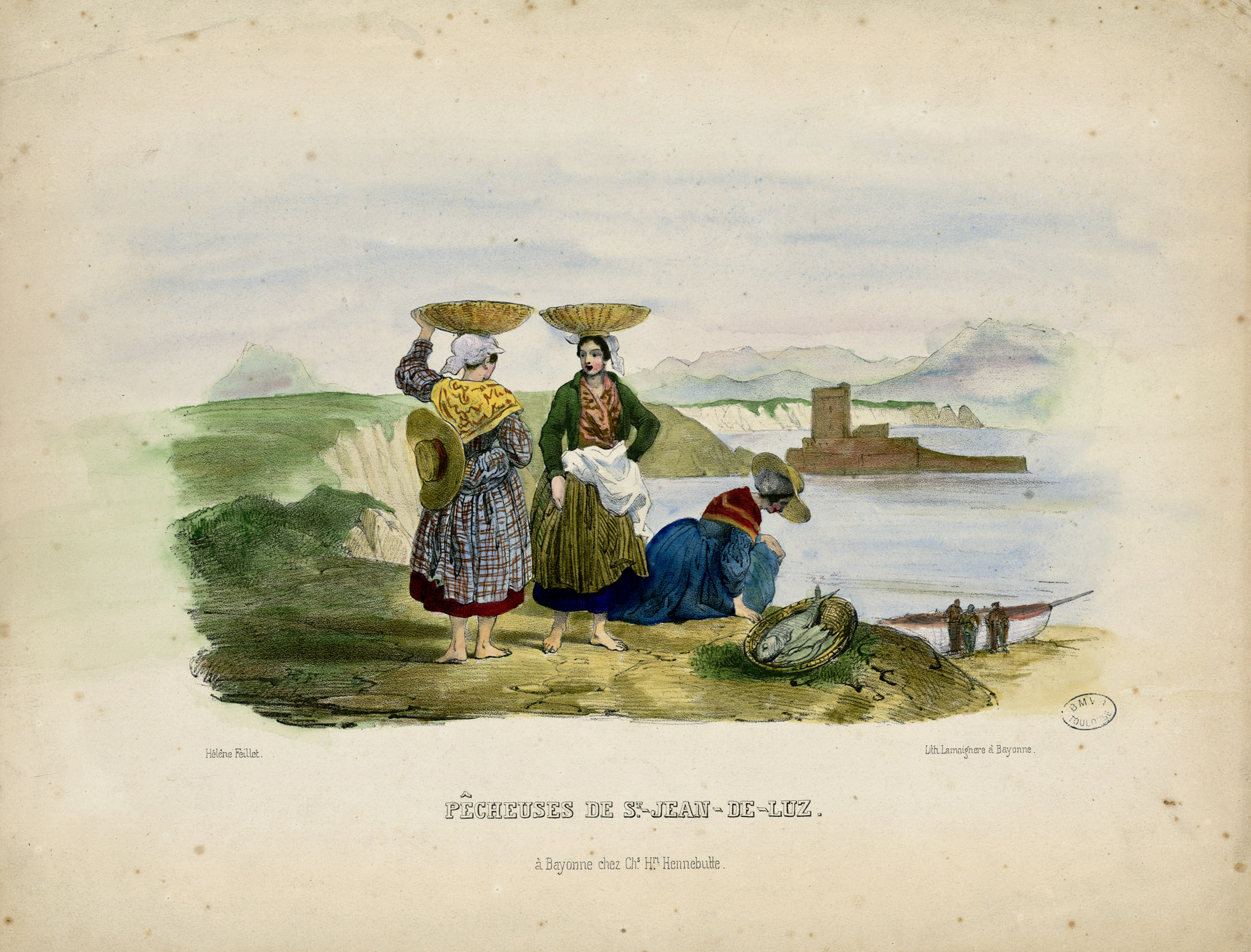
Pêcheuses de St Jean de Luz (Hélène Feillet, c.1940)

Joséphine Jeanne Hélène Feillet (2 November 1812 – 9 December 1889) was a French painter and lithographer. She is remembered in particular for the vignettes she engraved for albums illustrating Bayonne and the Basque Country. She was also a competent painter of both portraits and landscapes, exhibiting in the Paris salon from 1836.

== Biography ==
Born on 2 November 1812 in Paris, Joséphine Jeanne Hélène Feillet was the daughter of the painter and lithographer Pierre Jacques Feillet (1794–1855) and Hélène Pernotin. She was introduced to art by her father before studying portraiture under the Dutch artist Ary Scheffer (1795–1858). Her elder sister, Blanche Hennebutte-Feillet (1815–1886), was also a lithographer.

In 1929, during a visit to Madrid with her father and sister, she created lithographs as illustrations in Spanish journals. She continued the work, even after the family had settled in Bayonne in 1834. In particular, she made five engravings for El Artista, two illustrating poems by José de Espronceda and three for the poetry of Eugenio de Ochoa. They are considered to be among the finest romantic illustrations of the period.

From 1835 to 1940, Feillet created six lithographs to illustrate Félix Morel's Bayonne, vues historiques et descriptives. She then collaborated with her sister, creating an extensive series of illustration's for her brother-in-law, Charles-Henri Hennebutte. They appeared in his albums for tourists: Album des deux frontières and Guide du voyageur de Bayonne à Saint-Sébastien.

Feillet was nevertheless primarily a painter, exhibiting at the Paris salon from 1936. Notable examples of her work include a portrait of Juana Cano (1836), "Vue des environs de Bayonne, prise au Boucau" (1839), "Espagnole à l’église" and "Gitana en San Isidro, environs de Madrid". Her painting of "Arrivée à Bayonne du duc et de la duchesse d’Orléans", painted 1839–40, was exhibited at the Salon in 1942.

She was also commissioned to paint works to decorate the chapel of the Military Hospital in Bayonne and the church at Jasse en Béarn. Income from her art work enabled her to build a large residence overlooking the beach in Biarritz. She was also able to buy the Daguerre property in Brindos where she lived with her father. She died in Biarritz on 9 December 1889.
