= The Writer José de Espronceda =

1842 painting by Antonio María Esquivel

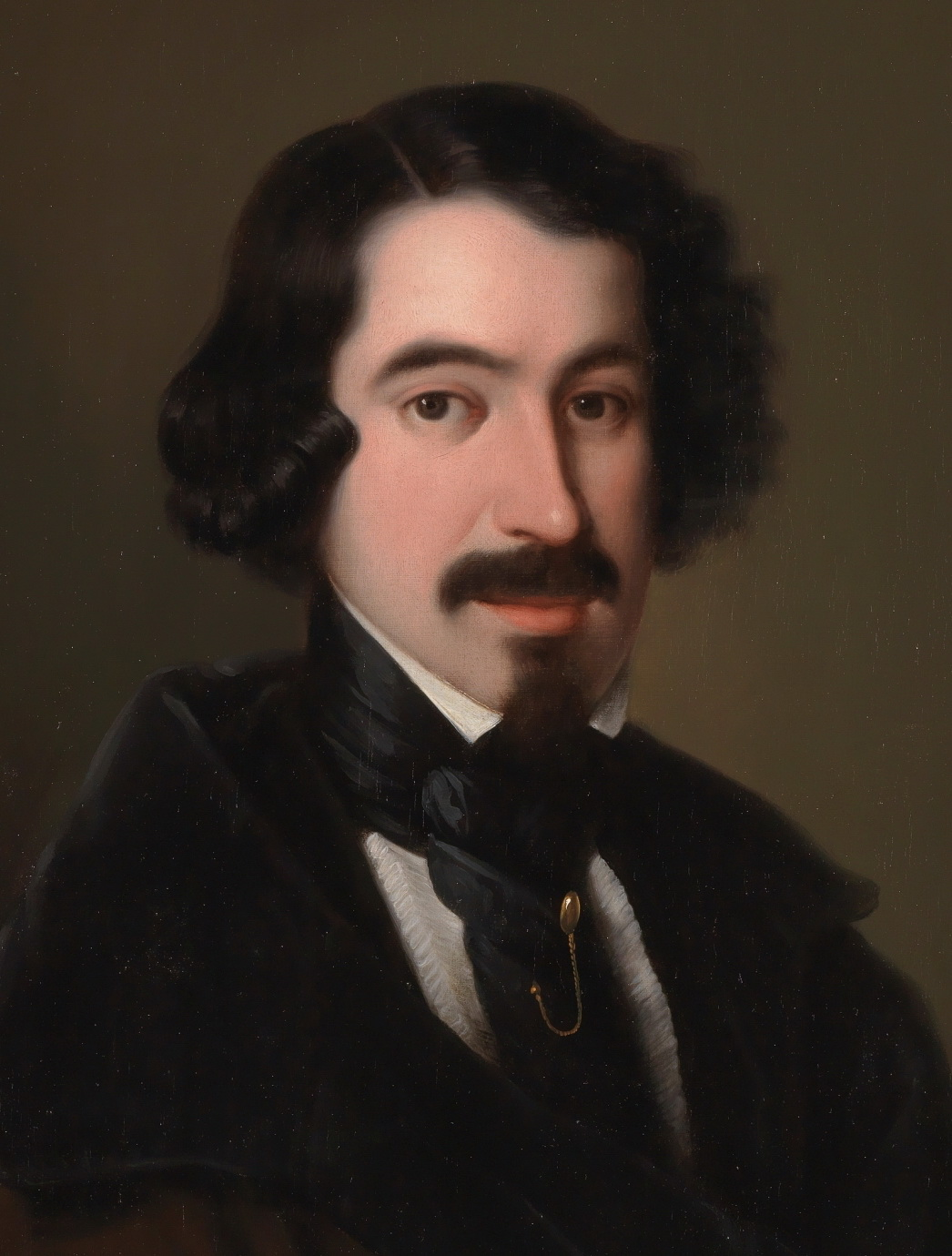
- Artist: Antonio María Esquivel
- Year: 1842
- Movement: Romanticism
- Dimensions: 72,7 × 56,2 cm
- Location: Museo del Prado, Madrid

The Writer José de Espronceda is an oil painting of 1842 by Antonio María Esquivel now in the Museo del Prado. It is a portrait of poet José de Espronceda.

There is a replica at the Biblioteca Nacional de Madrid and Ateneo de Madrid thanks to Manuel Arroyo.
