= El estudiante de Salamanca =

Narrative poem by José de Espronceda

El Estudiante de Salamanca
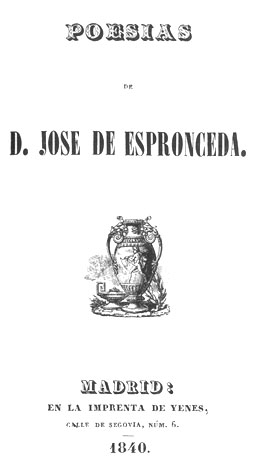
- Author: José de Espronceda
- Language: Spanish
- Genre: Romantic Poem
- Publisher: (copyright expired)
- Publication date: 1837
- Publication place: Spain
- Media type: Print

The Student of Salamanca (Spanish: El estudiante de Salamanca) is a work by Spanish Romantic poet José de Espronceda. It was published in fragments beginning in 1837; the complete poem was published in 1840 in the volume Poesías. Parts of it are poetry, other parts drama. It is a variation of the Don Juan legend, with its central character don Félix de Montemar playing the part of Don Juan.

== Plot ==
Don Félix seduces Elvira, who dies of love for him after he leaves her. Her brother Don Diego then comes to avenge her. Don Félix and Don Diego die in their duel. The work culminates in don Félix's descent into hell.
