= Blanche Hennebutte-Feillet =

French lithographer and painter

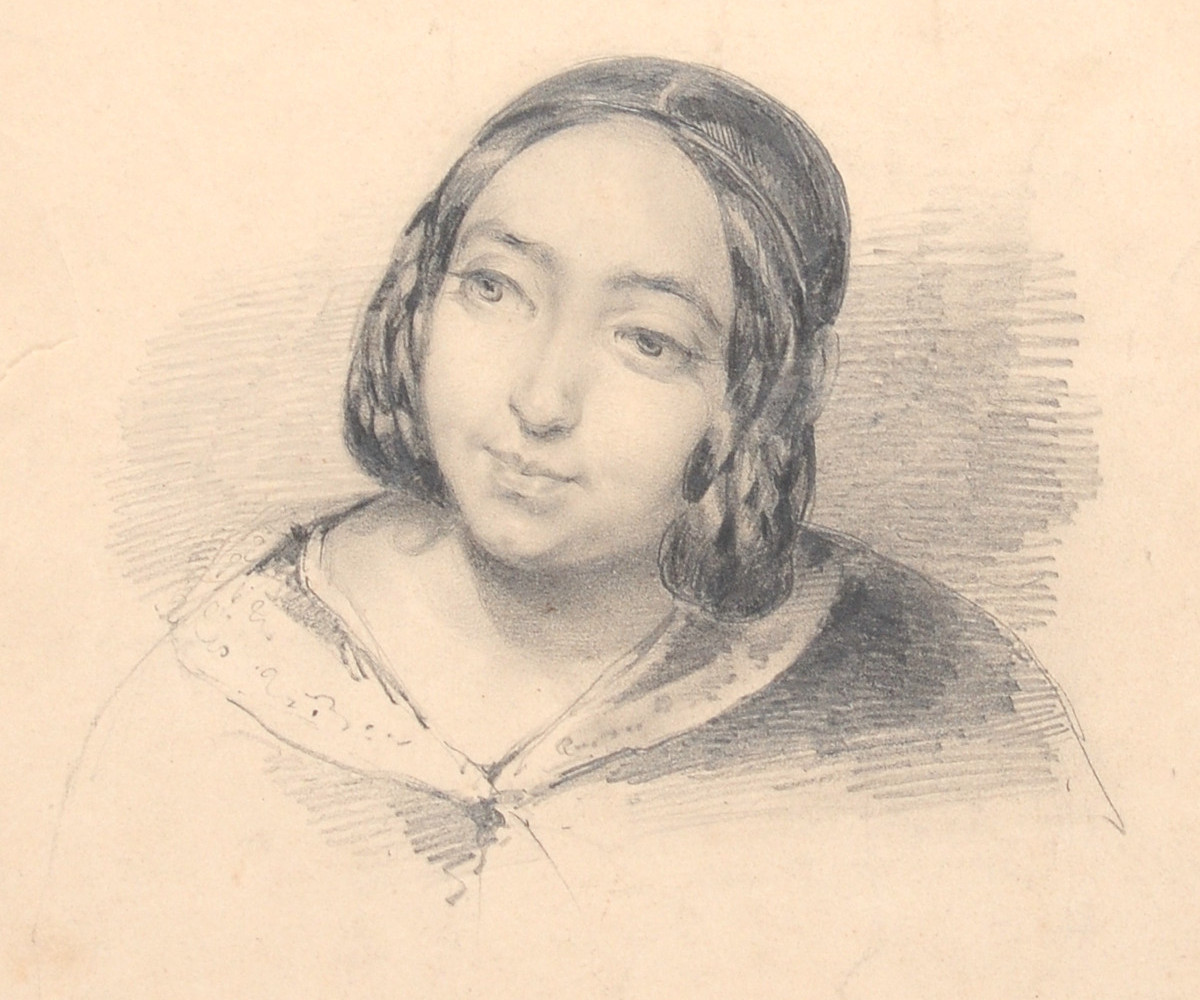
Blanche Hennebutte-Feillet

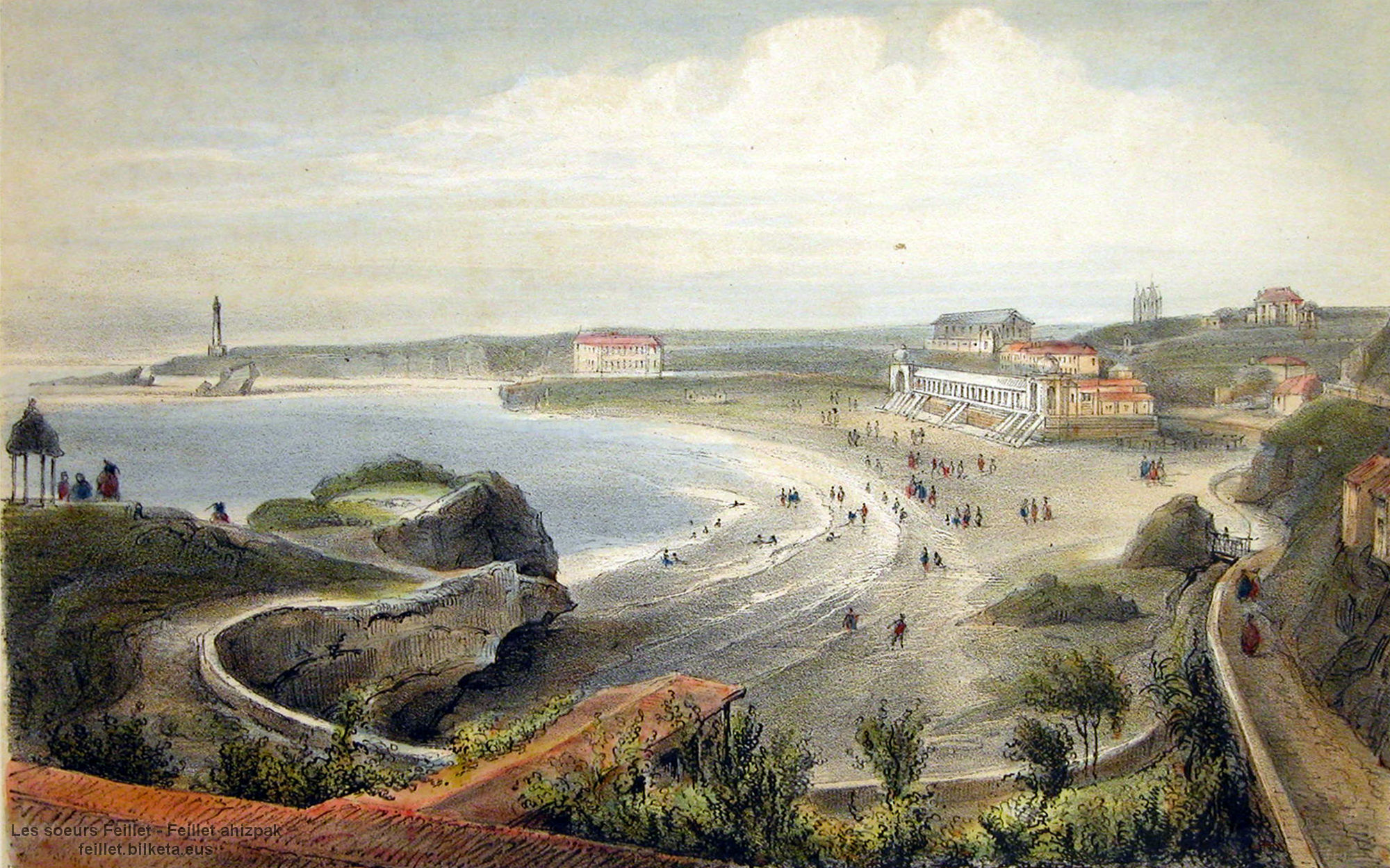
View of Biarritz (Blanche Hennebutte-Feillet, c.1840)

Blanche Hennebutte-Feillet (1815–1886) was a French lithographer and painter. She is remembered in particular for the lithographs she created for albums illustrating Bayonne and the Basque Country. As a painter, she exhibited in the Paris salon from 1841.

== Biography ==
Born in Paris on 5 November 1815, Blanche Feillet was the daughter of the painter and lithographer Pierre Jacques Feillet (1794–1855) and Hélène Pernotin. On 24 January 1844, she married Charles Henry Firmin Hennebutte, a publisher, with whom she had two children: Henri Joseph Ernest (1845) and Pierre Louis Gaston (1856).

She moved to Madrid with her family in 1829 before settling in Bayonne in 1834. Unlike her sister Hélène, she was more of a lithographer than a painter. She did nevertheless exhibit in the Paris Salon of 1841 with "Vue d’un moulin près de Saint-Jean-Pied-de-Port" and in 1848 with "Naufrage dans les rochers de Biarritz près de Bayonne" and "Vue de l’entrée de la Barre de Bayonne".

In the late 1840s, her husband published Description des environs de Bayonne which was illustrated with the lithographs she and her sister had created. It became popular with tourists who were beginning to travel to the area. It was followed in 1851 by Le Guide du Voyageur de Bayonne à Saint-Sébastien and in 1852 by "Album des deux frontières", again richly illustrated by the two sisters. The sold well in several editions, bringing prosperity to the family.

In 1857, in her father's footsteps, see was appointed head of the Bayonne Art School (Ecole de Dessin et de Peinture de Bayonne). She also taught ornamental drawing at Bayonne's Association Philomatique.

Blanche Hennebutte-Feillet died on 15 September 1886 in the family home in Biarritz.

In November 2015, the work of Hélène and Blache Feillet was exhibited at the Basque Museum in Bayonne.
