= Geoffrey Brereton =

Geoffrey Brereton (1906 – 1979) was a scholar and critic of French literature and Spanish literature.

== Education ==
Geoffrey Brereton studied French and Spanish at Oxford University and took a doctorate thesis in Paris on José de Espronceda.

He did some school teaching and taught and practised journalism, being a foreign correspondent for several newspapers, including the New Statesman. At the outbreak of the Second World War joined the BBC French Service in Algiers, as writer and eventually director.

== Works ==
His first scholarly publication, Jean Racine: A Critical Biography (1951), has been described as the best full study of Racine's life and works in English. He also wrote a Short History of French Literature (1954), an Introduction to the French Poets (1956), and edited the Penguin Book of French Verse, vol. 2 (1958).

Initially funded by a Leverhulme Fellowship, the last part of his research was spent studying the French classical theatre and saw the publication of Principles of Tragedy (1968), French Tragic Drama (1973) and French Comic Drama (1977).

All of his work as author, editor, translator and reviewer was done as a freelance, and rarely saw direct academic recognition. While being written a "wide, general readership", his works still contained "original, succinct, and often thought-provoking judgments".

A "fundamentally shy and engagingly modest man" with a "quiet and delightful sense of humour", he made a distinctive and distinguished contribution to French studies" in the United Kingdom and "placed many readers permanently in his debt".

== Bibliography ==
=== As an author ===
- Inside Spain, London: Quality Press, 1938
- Jean Racine: A Critical Biography, London: Cassell, 1951
- A Short History of French Literature, Harmondsworth, Middlesex: Penguin Books, 1954 (Pelican books, A297)
- Principles of Tragedy: A Rational Examination of the Tragic Concept in Life and Literature, London: Routledge & Kegan Paul, 1968
- An Introduction to French Poets: Villon to the Present Day, London: Methuen, 1956; 2nd edition, 1973
- French Tragic Drama in the Sixteenth and Seventeenth Centuries, London: Methuen, 1973 (University Paperbacks, 498)
- French Comic Drama from the Sixteenth to the Eighteenth Century, London: Methuen, 1977 (University Paperbacks, 607)

=== As an editor ===
- The Penguin Book of French Verse, 2: Sixteenth to Eighteenth Centuries, Harmondsworth, Middlesex: Penguin Books, 1954 (Penguin Poets, D43)
- La Putain Respecteuse & Le Diable et le Bon Dieu, Jean-Paul Sartre, Penguin, London, 1965
- Les Mains Sales, Jean-Paul Sartre, Methuen & Co., London, 1966

=== As a translator ===
- Jean Froissart, Chronicles, Baltimore: Penguin, 1968 (Penguin Classics, L200)
- Charles Perrault, Fairy Tales, Harmondsworth, Middlesex: Penguin Books, 1957 (Penguin Classics, L69)
