= Eduardo Sáenz Hermúa =

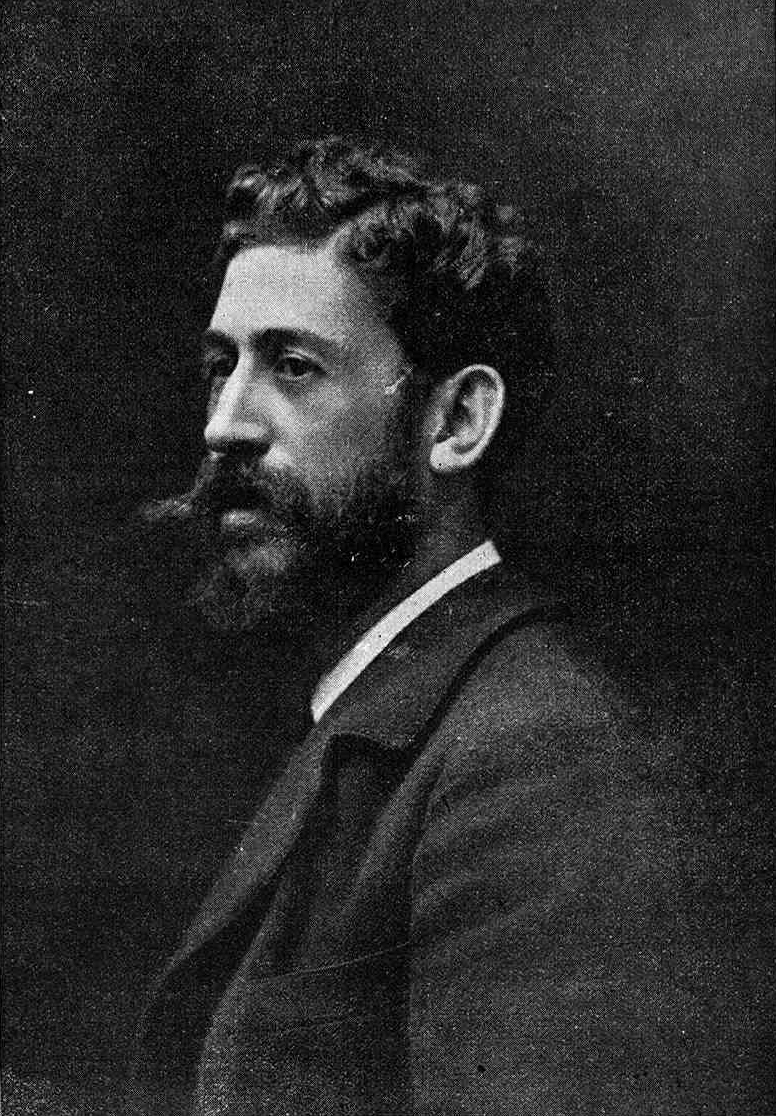
- Born: 1859; Madrid
- Died: 29 July 1898; Madrid
- Occupation: Illustrator

Eduardo Sáenz de Hermúa Fernández (1859–1898), artistically known as Mecachis, was a Spanish cartoonist, illustrator, and playwright. He also signed works as Augusto Marnaz.

== Biography ==
Born in 1859 in Madrid, he studied Medicine at the Colegio San Carlos, but he dropped out in 1879 and trained instead at the Escuela Superior de Pintura under Federico Madrazo and Luis Rivera. He worked in publications such as La Broma, Madrid Cómico, La Caricatura (which he founded in 1884 together with José Gil y Campos), La Correspondencia de España, and Blanco y Negro.

Regarding his playwright credits, he authored, among others, Sol, Tila, Figaro, Mademoiselle, Pajarón, El Barbero de mi barrio, and Los Chicos.

He died on 29 July 1898.

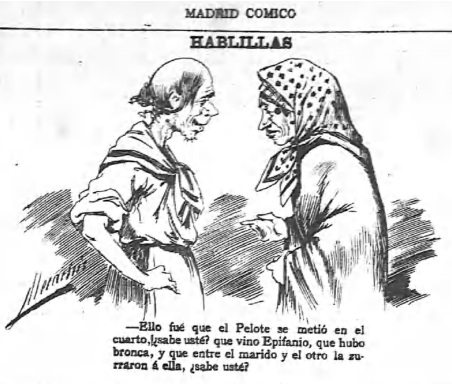
"Hablillas" (Madrid Cómico, 1889)

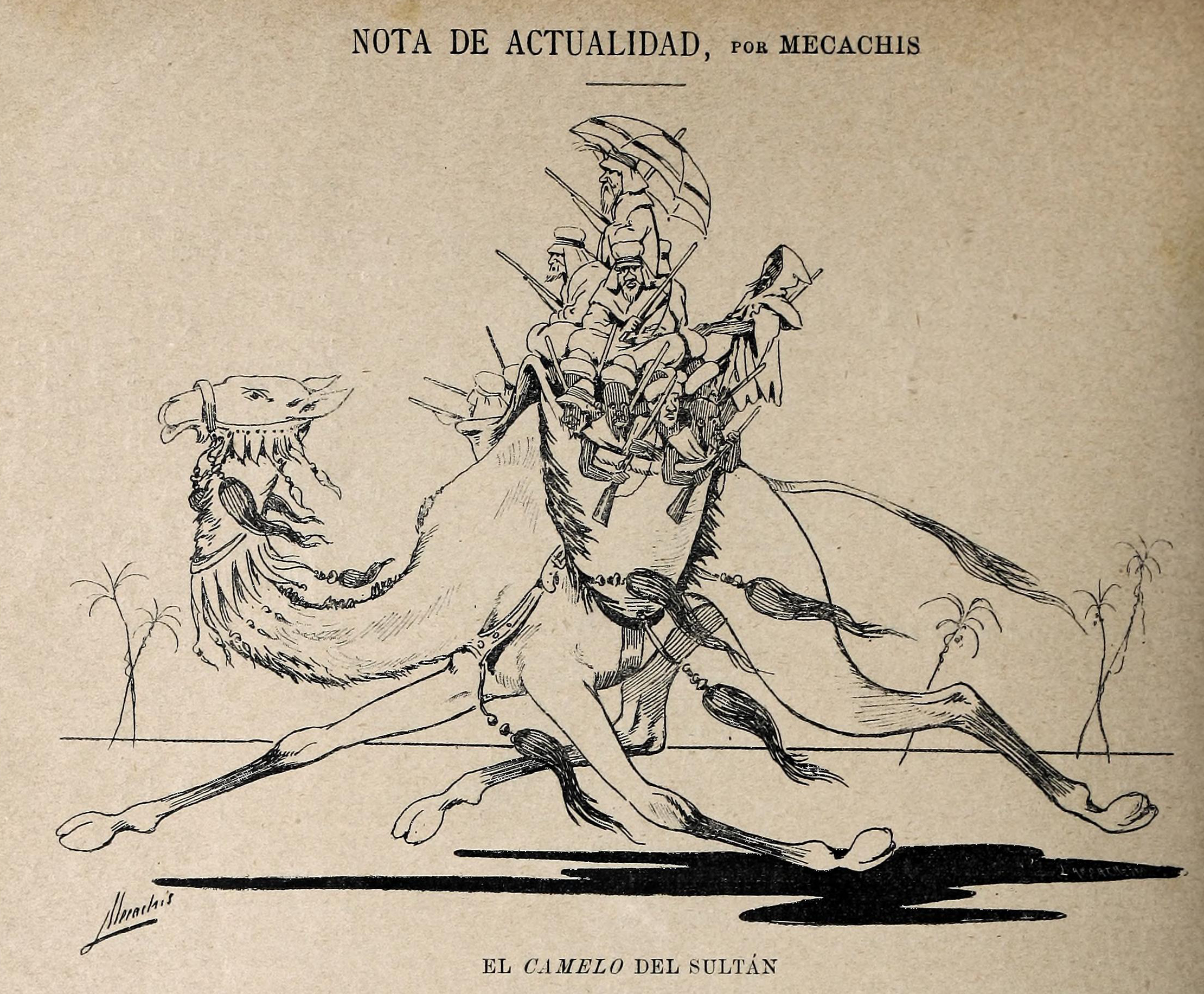
"El camelo del sultán" (B y N, 1893)

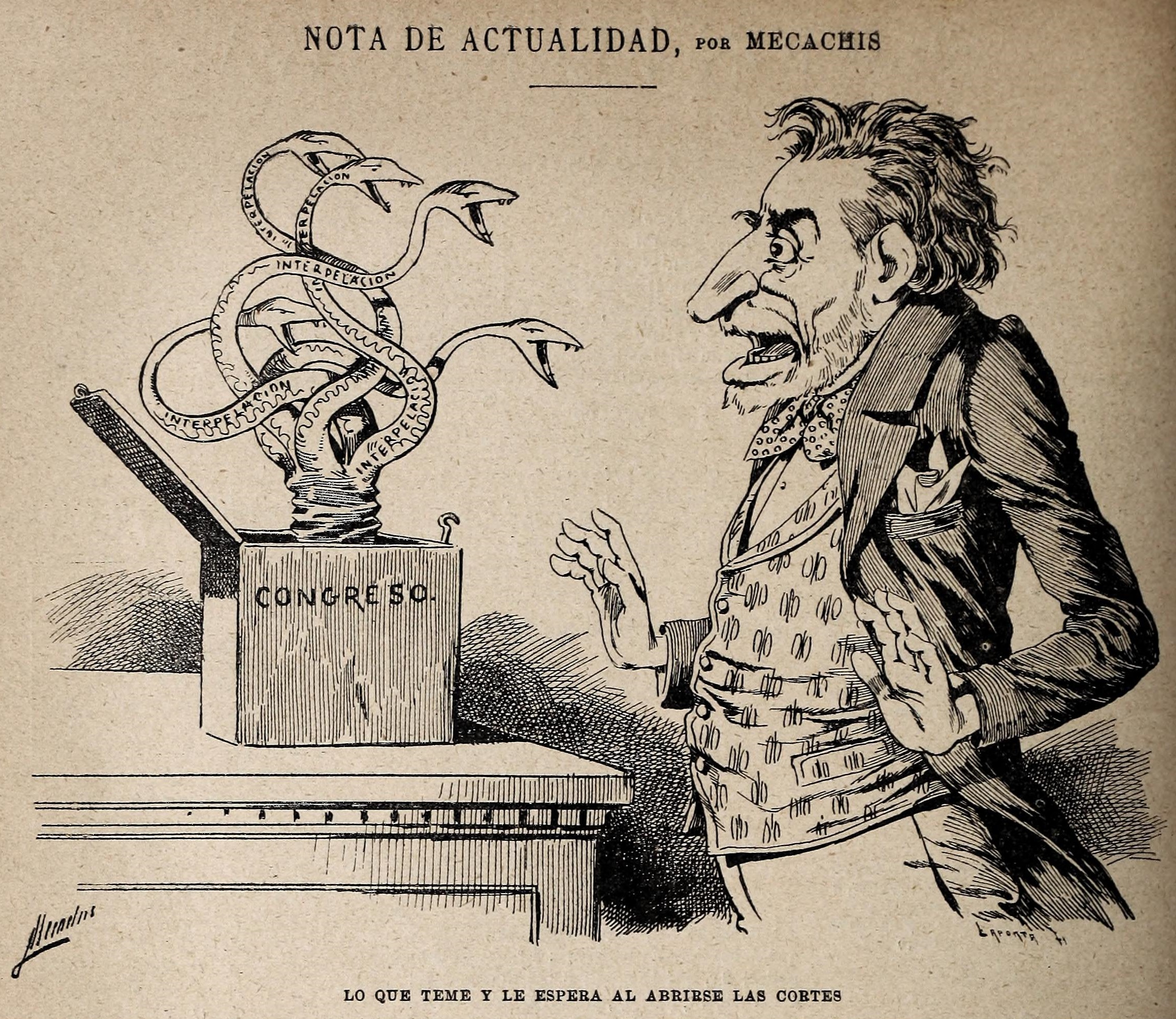
"Lo que teme y le espera al abrirse las Cortes" (B y N, 1894)
