= José de Espronceda =

19th-century Spanish poet (1808–1842)

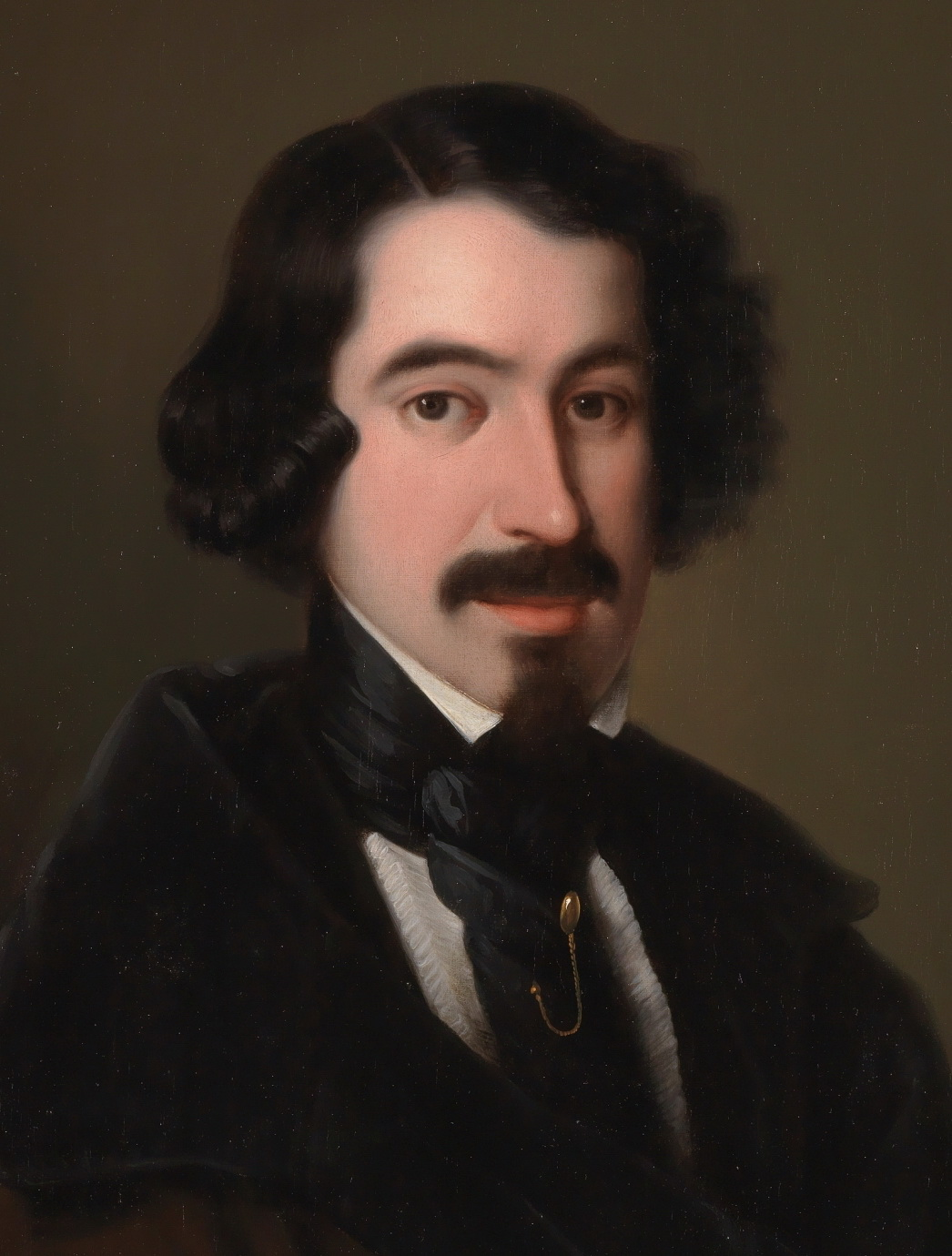
- El escritor José de Espronceda, portrait by Antonio María Esquivel (c.1845) (Museo del Prado, Madrid)
- Born: José Ignacio Javier Oriol Encarnación de Espronceda y Delgado; 25 March 1808; Almendralejo, Province of Badajoz, Extremadura, Spain
- Died: 23 May 1842 (aged 34); Madrid, Spain
- Resting place: Cementerio de San Justo
- Occupations: Poet, writer and journalist
- Movement: Romanticism
- Children: Blanca Espronceda de Escosura (1834–1900)
- Father: Camilo de Espronceda

José Ignacio Javier Oriol Encarnación de Espronceda y Delgado (25 March 1808 – 23 May 1842) was a Romantic Spanish poet, one of the most representative authors of the 19th century. He was influenced by Eugenio de Ochoa, Federico Madrazo, Alfred Tennyson, Richard Chenevix Trench and Diego de Alvear.

== Life ==
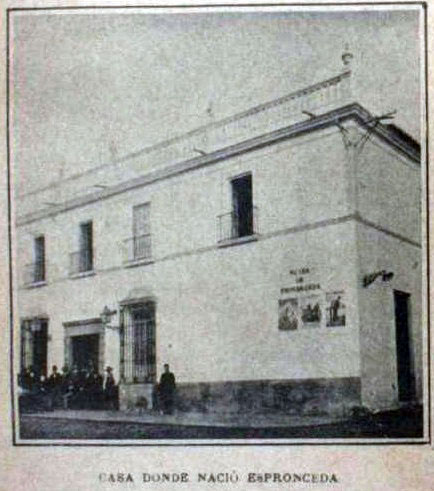
House where Espronceda was born

Espronceda was born in Almendralejo, at the Province of Badajoz. As a youth, he studied at the Colegio San Mateo at Madrid, having Alberto Lista as a teacher. When he was 15 years old, he formed a secret society named "Los Numantinos" alongside his friends Ventura de la Vega and Patricio de la Escosura, conspiring against Ferdinand VII and intending to avenge the death of Rafael del Riego. For this, he was imprisoned in a monastery and exiled. Afterward, he left Spain and lived in Lisbon, Belgium, France, England and Holland. On his return to Spain in 1833, he became active in the extreme left-wing of Spanish political culture. Espronceda is also known for his affair with Teresa Mancha, for whom he wrote "Canto a Teresa" (from El diablo mundo). He died of diphtheria in 1842.

In 1902, his body was moved to Panteón de Hombres Ilustres, Spain.

== Literary production ==
Having been inspired to a literary career by his teacher Alberto Lista, Espronceda began to write the historical poem El Pelayo during his stay in the monastery. The poem was never completed. Later he wrote the novel Sancho Saldaña. His other important works include El estudiante de Salamanca, whose main character is Don Félix de Montemar, El mendigo, ¡Guerra!, Al dos de mayo and El diablo mundo, long lyric poems, the latter remained unfinished. Also important were A Jarifa en una orgía, El verdugo, El canto del cosaco, La canción del pirata and Himno al sol. Many of his works display the tendencies of Romanticism, and along with José Zorrilla he is considered Spain's most important Romantic poet, as well as the most rebellious. In 2006 Diego Martinez Torron has published the first annotated edition of the complete works of José de Espronceda with unpublished text, and with also unpublished text in El otro Espronceda.

== Bibliography ==
- Marrast, Robert (1974). José de Espronceda et son temps. Littérature, societé, politique au temps du romantisme. Paris: Editions Klincksieck.
- "De Gibraltar a Lisboa, viaje histórico". El Pensamiento. LXXII (8). Biblioteca de Autores Españoles: 174–177. 31 August 1841.
- "Un recuerdo". El Pensamiento. LXXII (3). Biblioteca de Autores Españoles: 60–64. 15 June 1841.
- "Política general". El Pensamiento. LXXII (1). Biblioteca de Autores Españoles: 12–15. 15 May 1841.
- de la Escosura, Patricio (1879). Discurso...Madrid. p. 79.
- Casalduero, Joaquín (1967). Espronceda (2nd ed.). Madrid.
- Zorrilla, José (1882–1883). Recuerdos del tiempo viejo. Vol. I. Madrid. pp. 46–50.
- Geoffrey Brereton, Quelques précisions sur les sources d'Espronceda (Paris, 1933)
- Chisholm, Hugh, ed. (1911). "Esrronceda, Jose Ignacio Javier Oriol Encarnacion de" . Encyclopædia Britannica. Vol. 9 (11th ed.). Cambridge University Press. p. 775.
