= Pardal Mallet =

Brazilian writer

- A picture of Mallet
- Born: João Carlos de Medeiros Pardal Mallet; December 9, 1864; Bagé, Brazil
- Died: November 24, 1894 (aged 29); Caxambu, Brazil
- Education: University of São Paulo
- Occupations: Writer, journalist, short story writer
- Relatives: Émile Mallet, João Nepomuceno de Medeiros Mallet
- Writing career
- Notable works: Meu Álbum, Hóspede
- Literary movement: Naturalism, Parnassianism

João Carlos de Medeiros Pardal Mallet (December 9, 1864 – November 24, 1894) was a Brazilian journalist and novelist. He is the patron of the 30th chair of the Brazilian Academy of Letters.

== Life ==
Mallet was born in the city of Bagé, in Rio Grande do Sul, in 1864. His father was the General João Nepomuceno de Medeiros Mallet, and his grandfather was the French-born Marshal Émile Mallet. He was also of Portuguese and Irish descent.

From childhood, he had a strong affinity for literature. He also learned to speak English and French.

After completing his primary studies, he moved to Rio de Janeiro in order to study medicine at the Faculdade de Medicina da Universidade Federal do Rio de Janeiro, but he would not finish the course, because his teacher, the Viscount of Saboia, threatened to expel him because of his Republican ideals. He then abandoned medicine to devote himself to literature and journalism.

He then moved to São Paulo, to study law at the Faculdade de Direito da Universidade de São Paulo, but finished his course in Recife, Pernambuco. There, when he was receiving his diploma, he refused to take an oath because of his Republican ideals. The situation was circumvented thanks to Joaquim Nabuco. During his stay in Pernambuco, he published his first books: Hóspede and Meu Álbum, both in 1887.

Returning to Rio de Janeiro, he befriended many famous writers at the time, such as Olavo Bilac, Raul Pompeia, Coelho Neto, Luís Murat, José do Patrocínio, Artur and Aluísio Azevedo, Émile Rouède and Francisco de Paula Ney.

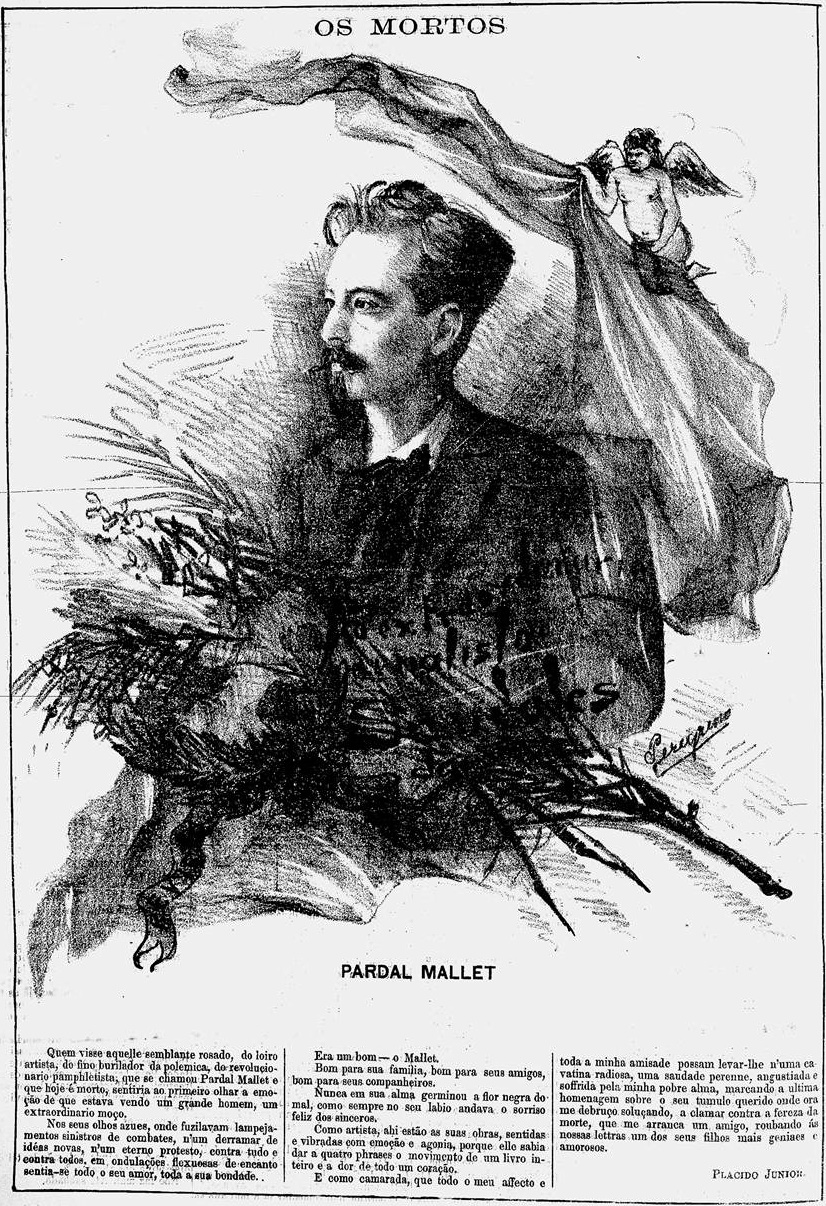
Pardal Mallet (Revista Theatral, 1894).

In 1888, he became the editor in chief of José do Patrocínio's journal A Cidade do Rio. However, Mallet would leave the journal in the following year due to political differences. Also in 1889, he had an argument with Olavo Bilac, that ended in a duel. One of Mallet's ribs was injured, but he and Bilac would reconcile.

After the proclamation of the First Brazilian Republic, Mallet joined the Revolta da Armada, in opposition to then-President of Brazil Floriano Peixoto. He was then arrested and exiled in the city of Tabatinga, in Amazonas. After amnesty was given, he returned to Rio.

He contracted tuberculosis and moved to the city of Caxambu, in Minas Gerais, in order to mitigate the disease, unsuccessfully. He died on November 24, 1894.

== Works ==
- Meu Álbum (short stories – 1887)
- Hóspede (novel – 1887)
- Lar (novel – 1888)
- A Pandilha (short stories – 1883)
- O Esqueleto (novel written in partnership with Olavo Bilac — 1890)
- Pelo Divórcio! (pamphlet – 1894)

Preceded by New creation	Brazilian Academy of Letters – Patron of the 30th chair	Succeeded by Pedro Rabelo (founder)
