= Isabel Gondim =

Brazilian educationist and writer (1839 – 1933)

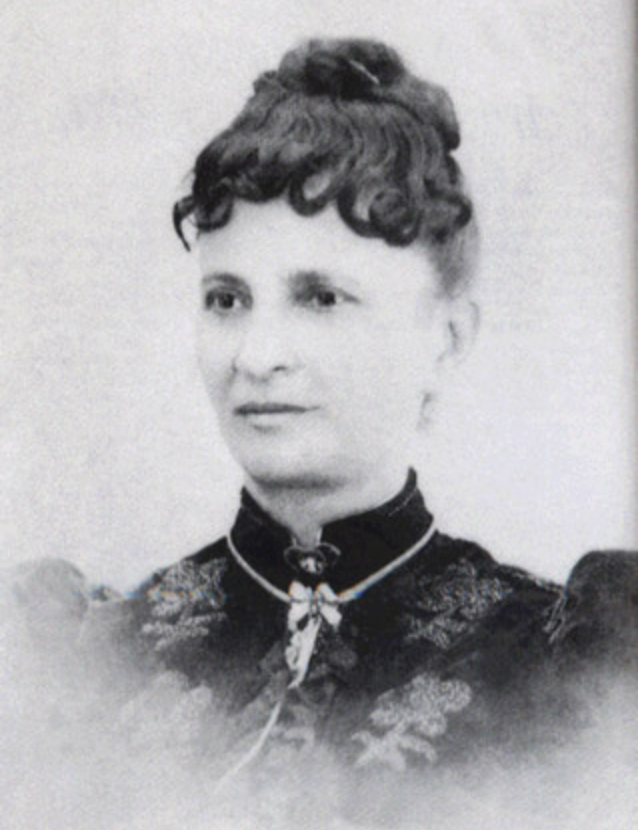
Isabel Gondim in the 1880s

Isabel Gondim (1839–1933) was a Brazilian educationist and writer. She was born in Parary, now Nísia Floresta. Her father Professor Urbano Egidio da Silva Costa Gondim de Albuquerque guided her early education. She moved to Natal to become a teacher. She championed female education throughout her career and wrote a popular book called Reflexões às minhas alunas that went through many reprints. She had conservative views, however, and held realist novels (such as O Cortiço by Aluísio Azevedo or O Ateneu by Raul de Pompeia) to be unsuitable for young minds.

She retired in 1891 at age 52. She then began to dedicate herself more seriously to literature and history, writing books such as O Brasil - poema histórico do país and Sedição de 1817 na Capitania ora Estado do Rio Grande do Norte. She continued to publish poetry and works on regional and national history, until her death in 1933. One of her last books was a volume of poems called A Lira Singela.
