= Cortiço =

Brazilian term for a dense, unsanitary urban area

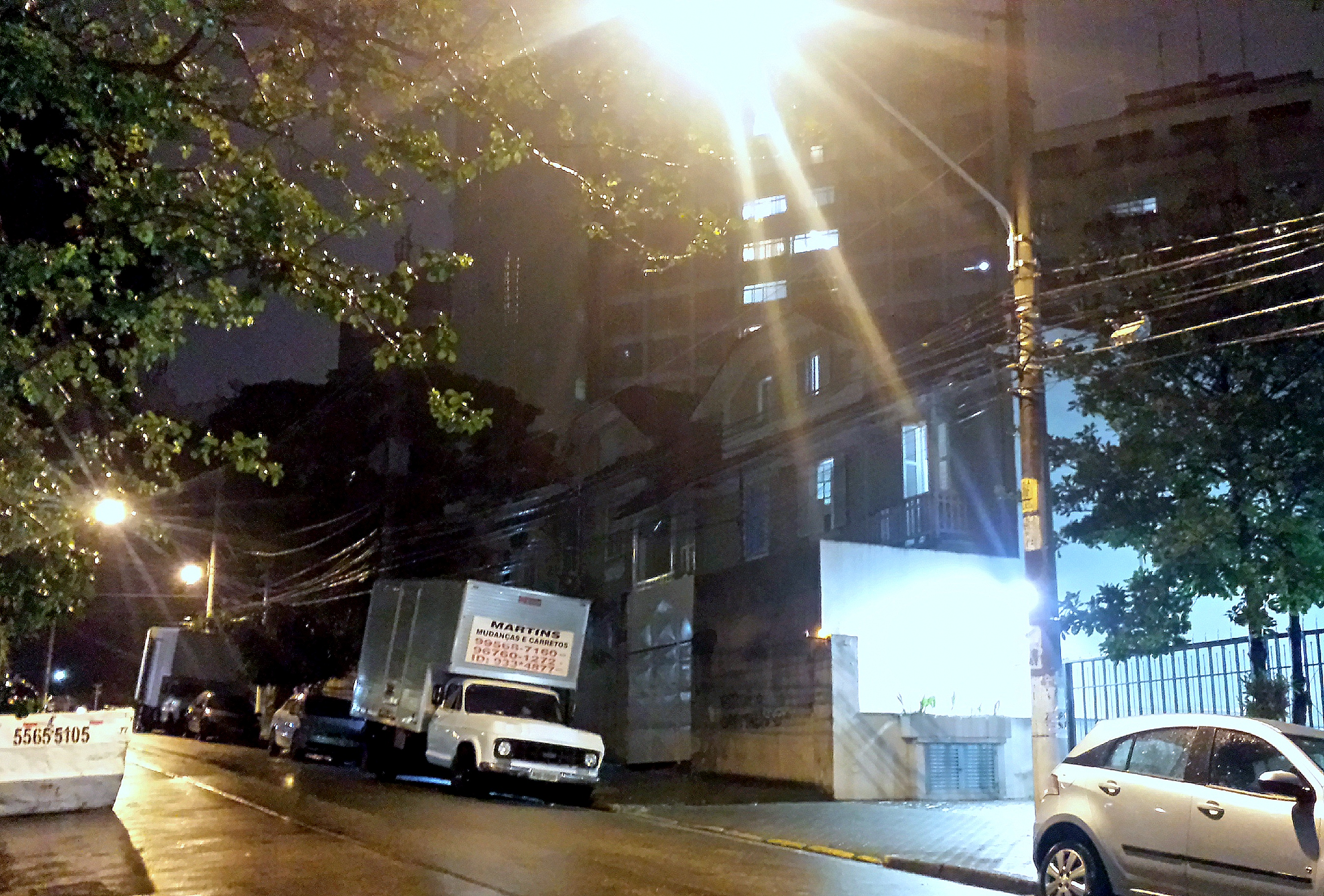
A building used as a cortiço in São Paulo, Brazil in 2014

Cortiço (pronounced [koʁˈtʃisu], [kuʁˈtʃisu]), or gueto (Portuguese language for "beehive" and "ghetto" respectively; tenements), is a common Portuguese term used in Brazil for an area of concentrated, high density urban housing where people live with poor sanitation and hygiene conditions. Cortiço houses are typically divided into small rooms that are rented. Cortiços exist in large cities, such as São Paulo, Salvador, Rio de Janeiro, and Recife. They originated in São Paulo, Brazil, during the late 1700s, and continue to exist in contemporary times in Rio de Janeiro and São Paulo. Less common today, most cortiços are old buildings in the central, older parts of the cities.

== Overview ==
Cortiços are typically large houses with interiors that have been divided into very small rooms for rent, typically with very little or no privacy. Cortiço residents are typically families who share a single room, with access to a shared bathroom and shared kitchen. Some units have a bathroom and/or kitchen in the room. Cortiços are not the same as favelas, which are entire communities of housing that are typically built independently and occupied by their owners.

== History ==
Cortiços originated in São Paulo, Brazil, during the late 18th century, developed by primarily Italian immigrants.

=== Etymology ===
The term was made popular by Brazilian writer Aluísio de Azevedo in 1890 with the book O Cortiço, a 19th-century Realist/Naturalist novel. The book portrayed aspects of poverty in urban society during the late 19th century in Rio de Janeiro.

== Brazil ==
=== Rio de Janeiro ===
In Rio de Janeiro during the 1890s, cortiços were poorly constructed tenements pieced together and stacked atop one-another, whereby they resembled beehives. During this time, cortiço tenants lived in cramped and crowded conditions, with poor quality water and sanitation facilities. Kitchen areas were shared, and cortiços typically lacked open spaces, an ability to obtain much privacy, ventilation and sunlight. Cortiços were present in downtown areas and near the docks in the central district of the city. It has been estimated that in 1888, cortiços housed around 31,272 of the city's 266,831 total residents, which is approximately 11.72% of the total population. During this time, it has been estimated that cortiços comprised 3.96% of the city's total buildings.

=== São Paulo ===
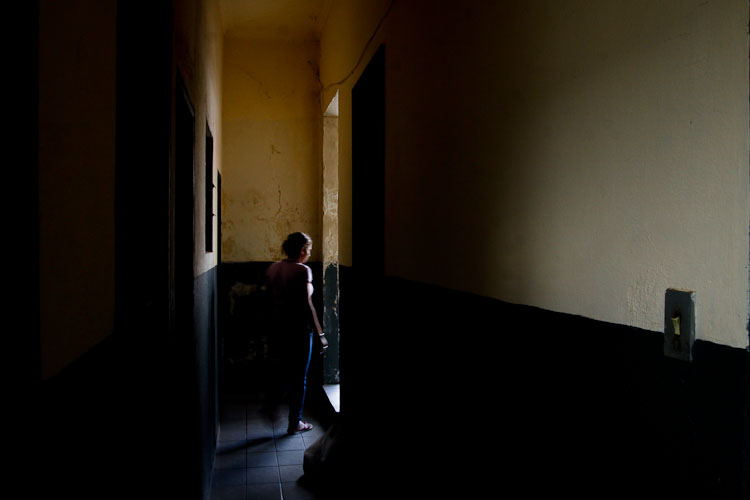
The interior of a cortiço in Bela Vista Centro, São Paulo, Brazil

In São Paulo, cortiços have been present in the center of the city since the 1880s. This began due to an influx of laborers working in the coffee market who needed affordable housing. During this time, many of the wealthy who inhabited the city center moved to suburban areas of São Paulo.

In the 1960s, many businesses located in downtown São Paulo were abandoned or vacated, after which many of the buildings were transformed into cortiços. During the 1980s, increasing numbers of buildings were abandoned, and during the 1990s, groups of organized people began moving into them.

In contemporary times, cortiços can be desirable for impoverished workers in São Paulo, because many of them are located near areas that offer amenities such as public transportation, state services, utilities and places that offer employment. A study that occurred circa 2000 found that when compared to rental prices of customary rental properties in São Paulo per square meter, cortiços were priced around 90% higher. It was estimated that cortiços in São Paulo in 1999 had an occupancy turn over rate of 47% per year.

Cortiços may sometimes be ignored or discounted by middle class residents in São Paulo who live in areas where cortiços exist, whereby city expansion developments and plans may not take the needs of cortiço residents into full consideration. Per assessments performed and conclusions devised by some analysts, city officials and documents may also ignore the aspect of cortiços in São Paulo.

Today in São Paulo, some cortiços are owned by landlords and their associates, who charge rental fees, and it can be a very profitable enterprise. In São Paulo, there is a term called "Mafia do cortiço", which refers to people who specialize in renting houses to be sublet as cortiços. Cortiço managed by the Mafia do cortiço have specific names that correspond with the neighborhoods they are located in. Some of these names include Janelinha and Carnot in Pari, Casa Rosada in Higienópolis, and Scoppeta in Brás.

== See also ==
- Tenement
- Chawl – a name for a type of building found in India. They are often 4 to 5 stories with about 10 to 20 tenements, referred to as kholis
