= National symbols of Brazil =

This list contains national symbols of the Federative Republic of Brazil.

== List of symbols ==
Symbol	Name	Image	References
Flag	Flag of Brazil		
Coat of arms	Coat of arms of Brazil		
Seal	National Seal of Brazil	(color) (without color)	
National motto	"Ordem e Progresso" (lit. 'Order and Progress')	—N/a	
National colors	Cores nacionais	Green; Yellow "May be used officially alongside": Blue; White	
National anthem	"Hino Nacional Brasileiro" (lit. 'Brazilian National Anthem')		
National animal	Onça-pintada (Panthera onca), (Note: Oficially the "national symbol of biodiversity conservation".) the jaguar		
National bird	Sabiá-laranjeira (Turdus rufiventris), the rufous-bellied thrush		
National tree	Pau-brasil (Paubrasilia echinata), the brazilwood		
National floral emblem	There is no official decree designating a National Flower of Brazil. Unofficially: Flowers of the ipê-amarelo (Handroanthus chrysotrichus), the gold trumpet tree. (Note: Popularly considered the National Flower of Brazil, but not officially so. Proposed by president Juscelino Kubitschek in 1956, president Jânio Quadros in 1961, Minister of Agriculture Hugo de Almeida Leme in 1965, then again by federal deputy Diogo Nomura in 1974 and 1975. For various reasons, none of the proposals were ever voted on by Congress. The 1975 proposal was rejected by the Education and Culture Commission in 1977, with the reasoning that the "subject of the project is irrelevant" and that they "[did] not see [...] why consider the yellow ipê as the national flower of Brazil, when there exists, for example, the purple ipê [...], flowers like the coffee, the peach, etc., that could also deserve the intended distinction, not being agreeable, therefore, this measure we consider discriminatory.")		
National founder	Pedro I of Brazil		
