= Artur Azevedo =

Brazilian writer

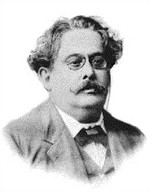
- Born: Artur Nabantino Gonçalves de Azevedo; 7 July 1855; São Luís, Brazil
- Died: 22 October 1908 (aged 53); Rio de Janeiro, Brazil
- Occupations: Playwright, journalist, poet, chronicler, short story writer
- Relatives: Aluísio Azevedo
- Writing career
- Notable work: A Capital Federal
- Movement: Parnassianism

Artur Nabantino Gonçalves de Azevedo (7 July 1855 – 22 October 1908) was a Brazilian playwright, short story writer, chronicler, journalist and Parnassian poet. He is famous for consolidating in Brazil the "comedy of manners" genre, initiated by Martins Pena.

He founded and occupied the 29th chair of the Brazilian Academy of Letters from 1897 until his death in 1908.

== Life ==
Azevedo was born in the city of São Luís, in Maranhão, to the Portuguese vice-consul in Brazil David Gonçalves de Azevedo and Emília Amália Pinto de Magalhães. He was the older brother of Naturalist novelist Aluísio Azevedo, famous for writing O Mulato, O Cortiço and Casa de Pensão.

Azevedo would show a love for theatre since he was a child. Initially working as a salesman, he later got a job at the provincial administration, but was fired for writing satires against the government. He later found a job as an amanuensis in the Brazilian Ministry of Agriculture.

Later beginning a promissory career as a journalist, he worked for the newspapers A Estação, where he met Machado de Assis, and Novidades, where he met Alcindo Guanabara, Moreira Sampaio, Olavo Bilac and Coelho Neto.

He died in 1908.

== Works ==
=== Poetry ===
- Carapuças (1871)
- Sonetos (1876)

=== Short story collections ===
- Contos Possíveis (1889)
- Contos Fora de Moda (1894)
- Contos Efêmeros (1897)
- Contos em Verso (1898)

=== Theatre plays ===
- Amor por Anexins (1872)
- A Filha de Maria Angu (1876)
- Uma Véspera de Reis (1876)
- A Pele do Lobo (1877)
- Joia (1879)
- O Anjo da Vingança (1882 – in partnership with Urbano Duarte de Oliveira)
- O Escravocrata (1884 – in partnership with Urbano Duarte de Oliveira)
- Almanjarra (1888)
- Fritzmack (1889 – in partnership with Aluísio Azevedo)
- A Capital Federal (1897)
- O Badejo (1898)
- Confidências (1898)
- O Jagunço (1898)
- Comeu! (1901)
- O Retrato a Óleo (1902)
- O Dote (1907)

Preceded by Martins Pena (patron)	Brazilian Academy of Letters – Occupant of the 29th chair 1897–1908	Succeeded by Vicente de Carvalho
