= Medeiros e Albuquerque =

Brazilian journalist, writer and politician

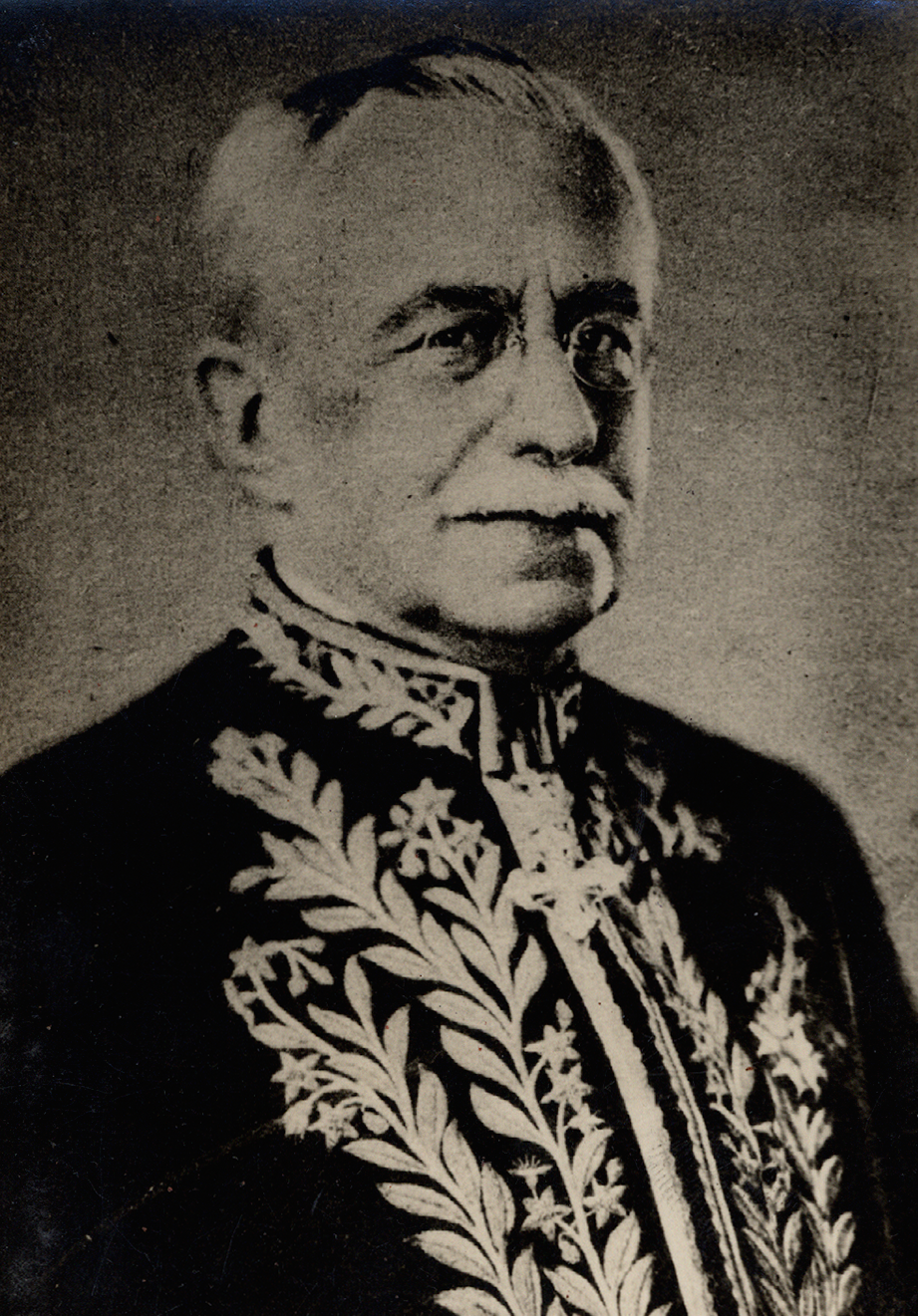
- Born: José Joaquim de Campos da Costa de Medeiros e Albuquerque; 4 September 1867; Recife, Pernambuco, Brazil
- Died: 9 June 1934 (aged 66); Rio de Janeiro, Rio de Janeiro, Brazil
- Occupations: Poet; politician; teacher; journalist; short story writer; civil servant; essayist; orator; novelist; dramatist; comedian
- Writing career
- Pen name: Armando Quevedo
- Notable work: Brazilian Republic Anthem

José Joaquim de Campos da Costa de Medeiros e Albuquerque (4 September 1867 – 9 June 1934) was a Brazilian poet, politician, teacher, journalist, short story writer, civil servant, essayist, orator, novelist and dramatist. He is famous for writing the lyrics of the Brazilian Republic Anthem in 1890.

He founded and occupied the 22nd chair of the Brazilian Academy of Letters from 1897 until his death in 1934.

He was also the President of the Academy in 1923.

== Life ==
Albuquerque was born in 1867 in Recife, Pernambuco, the son of Dr. José Joaquim de Campos de Medeiros e Albuquerque. Initially homeschooled by his mother, he studied at the Colégio Pedro II and later in Lisbon. Returning to Brazil, he studied natural history with Émil Goeldi and was tutored by Sílvio Romero. He initially worked as a primary teacher, getting in contact with famous writers such as Francisco de Paula Ney and Pardal Mallet. In 1889 he published his first poetry books: Pecados and Canções da Decadência, of strong Symbolist influence.

In 1888 he worked for the newspaper Novidades alongside Alcindo Guanabara, defending Abolitionist ideals. With the proclamation of the Republic in Brazil, he was nominated a secretary by Aristides Lobo and a minister by Benjamin Constant Botelho de Magalhães. From 1890 onwards he became a teacher for the Escola Nacional de Belas Artes and wrote the lyrics of the Brazilian Republic Anthem.

He was an atheist for most of his life, but he converted to Catholicism later in life.

During his last years of life, he would write for many newspapers, using pen names such as Armando Quevedo, Atasius Noll, J. dos Santos, Max and Rifiúfio Singapura.

He died in 1934.

== Works ==
=== Poetry ===
- Pecados (1889)
- Canções da Decadência (1889)
- Poesias 1893—1901 (1904)
- Fim (1922)
- Poemas Sem Versos (1924)
- Quando Eu Falava de Amor (1933)

=== Short stories ===
- Um Homem Prático (1898)
- Mãe Tapuia (1900)
- Contos Escolhidos (1907)
- O Assassinato do General (1926)
- O Umbigo de Adão (1932)
- Se Eu Fosse Sherlock Holmes (1932)
- Segredo Conjugal (co-authorship – 1934)
- Surpresas (1934)

=== Novels ===
- Marta (1920)
- Mistério (co-authorship – 1921)
- Laura (1933)

=== Theatre plays ===
- O Escândalo (1910)
- Teatro Meu... E dos Outros (1923)

=== Essays and conferences ===
- Em Voz Alta (1909)
- O Silêncio É de Ouro (1912)
- Pontos de Vista (1913)
- Literatura Alheia (1914)
- Páginas de Crítica (1920)
- O Hipnotismo (1921)
- Graves e Fúteis (1922)
- Homens e Coisas da Academia (1934)
- A Obra de Júlio Dantas (n.d.)

=== Memoirs and travel accounts ===
- Por Alheias Terras... (1931)
- Minha Vida: Da Infância à Mocidade (1867—1893) (1933)
- Minha Vida: Da Mocidade à Velhice (1893—1934) (1934)

Preceded by José Bonifácio the Younger (patron)	Brazilian Academy of Letters – Occupant of the 22nd chair 1897–1934	Succeeded by Miguel Osório de Almeida

Preceded by Afrânio Peixoto	President of the Brazilian Academy of Letters; 1923	Succeeded by Afrânio Peixoto
