= Pedro Rabelo =

Pedro Carlos da Silva Rabelo was a Brazilian journalist, short story writer and poet. He was born in Rio de Janeiro on October 19, 1868. He was the son of Joaquim de Oliveira Rabelo and Firmina Rodrigues Silva Rabelo. At a very young age, he began writing for the Rio press and established his name as a journalist. Before the age of twenty, he had joined up with the abolitionist campaign in Brazil. He was also a regular presence in the bohemian circles of the time; among his closest friends were Olavo Bilac and Guimarães Passos. Like everyone else in this group, he contributed to numerous newspapers.

He became a member of the Academia Brasileira when he was only 28 years old. But his name as a short story writer was already established by then. He succeeded his deceased friend Pardal Mallet, who had been the founding occupant of Seat 30 at the academy.

Rabelo died in Rio de Janeiro on December 27, 1905, aged 37. His published work is small, but includes well-received works of poetry and short stories.

== Selected works ==
- Ópera lírica, poesia (1894)
- Alma alheia, contos (1895)
- Filhotadas, versos humorísticos (1898)
- Casos alegres: histórias para gente sorumbática (1905)
