= Brazilian National Anthem =

Hino Nacional Brasileiro
English: Brazilian National Anthem; National Anthem of Brazil
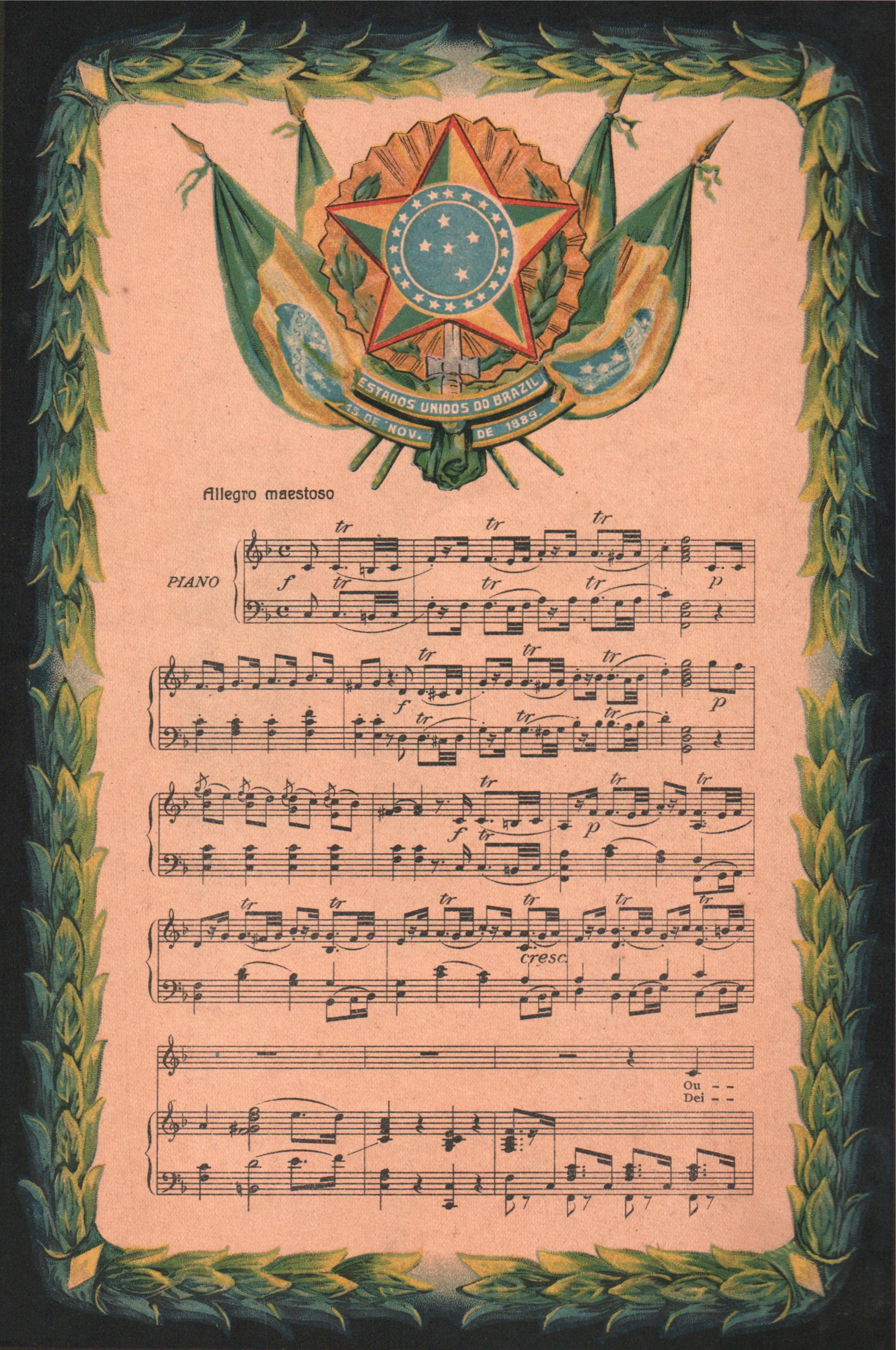
- Sheet music
- National anthem of Brazil
- Lyrics: Osório Duque-Estrada, 1909
- Music: Francisco Manuel da Silva, 1831
- Adopted: 13 April 1831 (by the Empire of Brazil); 20 January 1890 (by the United States of Brazil); 6 September 1922 (lyrics adopted)

Audio sample
- Official orchestral and vocal recording in F major by the Choir BDMG and Minas Gerais Military Police Symphony Orchestra: file; help

Official orchestral recording in F major

U.S. Navy Band instrumental rendition in B-flat major (one verse)

The "Brazilian National Anthem" (Hino Nacional Brasileiro), also known as the National Anthem of Brazil, was composed by Francisco Manuel da Silva in 1831 and had been given at least two sets of unofficial lyrics before a 1922 decree by president Epitácio Pessoa gave the anthem its definitive, official lyrics, by Joaquim Osório Duque-Estrada, after several changes were made to his proposal, written in 1909.

The lyrics have been described as Parnassian in style and Romantic in content, while the melody has been characterized as a patriotic march reminiscent of the works of Gioachino Rossini.

== History ==
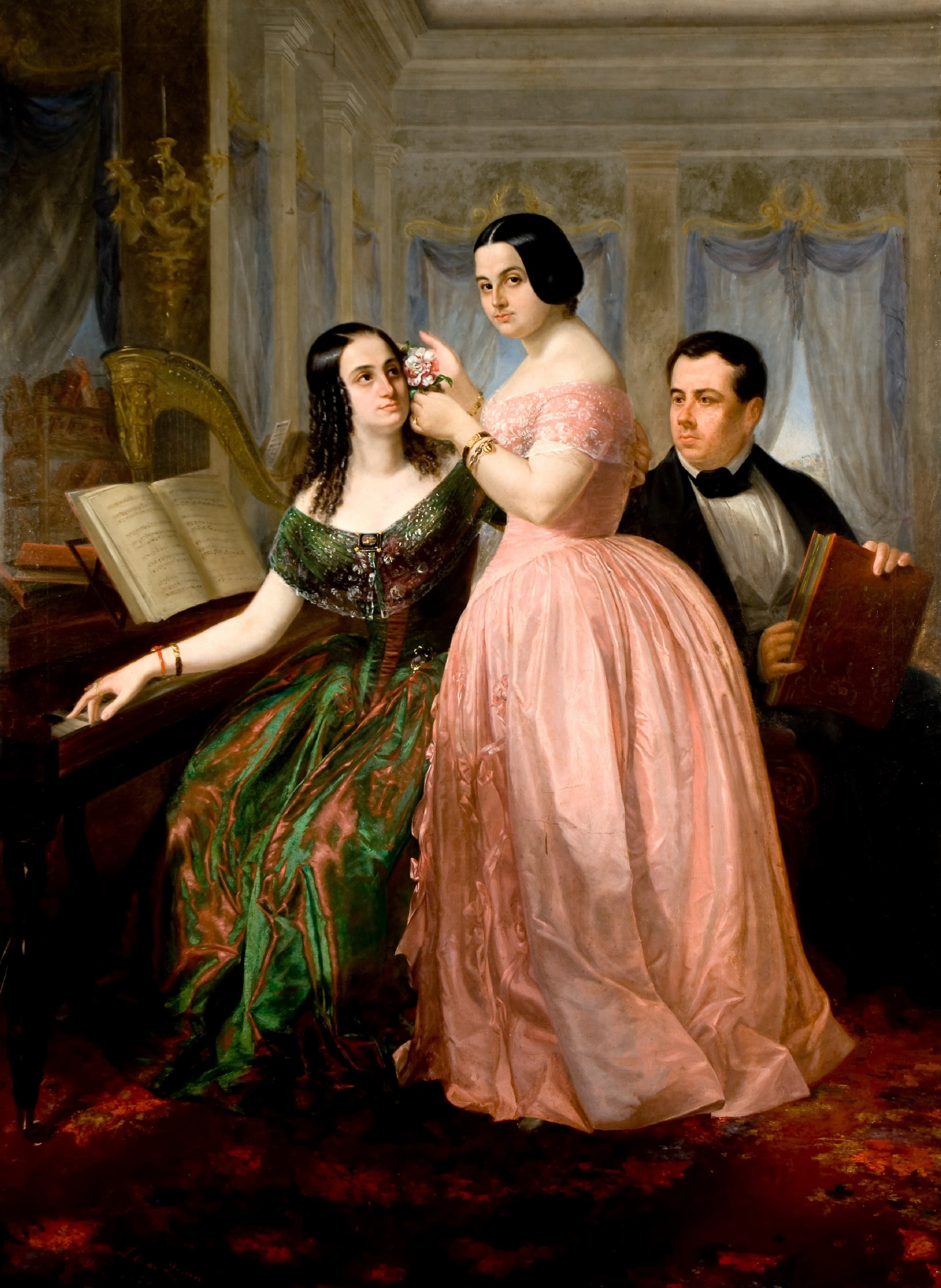
Conductor Francisco Manuel dictating the National Anthem, by José Correia de Lima, 1850

The melody of the Brazilian national anthem was composed by Francisco Manuel da Silva, and was presented to the public for the first time in April 1831. On 7 April 1831, the first Brazilian Emperor, Pedro I, abdicated the Crown and days later left for Europe, leaving behind the then-five-year-old Emperor Pedro II.

From the Brazilian proclamation of independence in 1822 until the 1831 abdication, an anthem that had been composed by Pedro I himself, celebrating the country's independence (and that now continues to be an official patriotic song, the Independence Anthem), was used as the national anthem. In the immediate aftermath of the abdication of Pedro I, the anthem composed by him fell in popularity.

Francisco Manuel da Silva then seized this opportunity to present his composition, and the anthem written by him was played in public for the first time on 13 April 1831. On that same day, the ship carrying the former Emperor left the port of Rio de Janeiro. The date of April 13 now appears in official calendars as the Day of the Brazilian National Anthem.

As to the actual date of composition of the music presented in April 1831, there is controversy among historians. Some hold that Francisco Manuel da Silva composed the music in the last four months of 1822 to commemorate Brazil's independence (declared on 7 September 1822), others hold that the hymn was written in early 1823 and others consider the evidence of composition dating back to 1822 or 1823 unreliable, and hold that the Anthem presented on 13 April 1831 was written in 1831, and not before. In any event, the Anthem remained in obscurity until it was played in public on 13 April 1831. In style, the music resembles early Romantic Italian music such as that of Gioachino Rossini.

Initially, the music composed by Francisco Manuel da Silva was given lyrics by Appeals Judge Ovídio Saraiva de Carvalho e Silva not as a national anthem, but as a hymn commemorating the abdication of Pedro I and the accession of Pedro II to the Throne. It was known during this early period as "April 7 Hymn". The lyrics by Ovídio Saraiva soon fell out of use, given that they were considered poor, and even offensive towards the Portuguese. The music, however, continued enjoying sustained popularity and by 1837 it was played, without lyrics, in all public ceremonies.

Although no statute was passed during the imperial period to declare Francisco Manuel da Silva's musical composition as the national anthem, no formal enactment was considered necessary for the adoption of a national anthem. A national anthem was seen as resulting from praxis or tradition. Thus, by 1837, when it was played in all official solemnities, Francisco Manuel da Silva's composition was already the de facto Brazilian National Anthem.

A new set of lyrics was proposed in 1841, to commemorate the coming of age and Coronation of Emperor Pedro II; those lyrics, popular but also considered poor, were soon abandoned as well, this time by order of Emperor Pedro II, who specified that in public ceremonies the anthem should be played with no lyrics. Emperor Pedro II directed that Francisco Manuel da Silva's composition, as the national anthem of the Empire of Brazil, should be played, without lyrics, on all occasions when the monarch presented himself in public, and in solemnities of military or civilian nature; the composition was also played abroad in diplomatic events relating to Brazil or when the Brazilian Emperor was present.

During the Empire of Brazil era, the U.S. composer and pianist Louis Moreau Gottschalk, then residing in Rio de Janeiro, composed two nationalistic works of classical music based on the Brazilian National Anthem that achieved great popularity at the time: the Brazilian Solemn March ("Marcha Solene Brasileira", in the modern Portuguese spelling or "Marcha Solemne Brazileira", in the original spelling in force at the time of composition) and the Great Triumphal Fantasy on the Brazilian National Anthem ("Grande Fantasia Triunfal sobre o Hino Nacional Brasileiro"). The former was dedicated to Emperor Pedro II, and the latter was dedicated to his heiress presumptive, the Princess Imperial Isabel. Those works are in the vein of similar compositions written at the time in other nations, such as Charles Gounod's Fantasy on the Russian National Anthem. The Grand Triumphal Fantasy, long forgotten, resurfaced in popularity in 1985, at the dawn of Brazil's New Republic, during the country's re-democratization process after the military dictatorship that ruled the country from 1964 to 1985, when it was played to accompany the funeral cortège of president-elect Tancredo Neves. It was also played during the televised electoral spots of the Democratic Labour Party.

Anthem in 1901

Anthem in 1905

After the Proclamation of the Republic in 1889, the new republican rulers held a contest in order to choose a new anthem; the contest was won by Leopoldo Miguez, with lyrics by Medeiros e Albuquerque. After protests against the adoption of the proposed new anthem, however, the head of the Provisional Government, Deodoro da Fonseca, formalized Francisco Manuel da Silva's composition as the national anthem, while the composition by Miguez and Medeiros e Albuquerque was declared the Anthem of the Proclamation of the Republic. Deodoro himself was said to prefer the old anthem to the new composition. The Decree of the Provisional Government (Decree No. 171 of 1890) confirming Francisco Manuel da Silva's composition, that had served as the National Anthem of the Empire of Brazil, as the National Anthem of the new Republic, was issued on 20 January 1890.

In the early days of the new Federal Republic, the National Anthem continued without official lyrics, but several lyrics were proposed, and some were even adopted by different states of Brazil. The lack of uniform, official lyrics would only be terminated in 1922, during the celebrations of the first centennial of the Proclamation of Independence, when an adapted version of Joaquim Osório Duque Estrada's lyrics, first proposed in 1909, were deemed official.

The official lyrics of the Brazilian National Anthem were proclaimed by decree of president Epitácio Pessoa (Decree No. 15,761 of 1922), issued on 6 September 1922, at the height of the celebrations of the Independence Centennial. This presidential decree was issued in accordance with authorization contained in a legislative decree adopted by the National Congress of Brazil on 21 August 1922. Furthermore, as allowed by said legislative decree, and before the President of the Republic issued his decree proclaiming the official adoption of Joaquim Osório Duque Estrada's lyrics as the official lyrics of the National anthem, the Federal Government finalized the purchase of the lyrics written by Duque Estrada, signing with the composer the contract that transferred all the rights of authorship over the said lyrics to the Federal Union, and paying the agreed price of Rs5:000$ (five contos of réis).

On 7 September 1922, on the exact day of the Independence Centennial, radio broadcasts began in Brazil, and the first broadcast was the performance of the National Anthem with the new lyrics, followed by the speech by president Epitácio Pessoa, the first radio address by a Brazilian president.

The national anthem is considered by the current Constitution of Brazil, adopted in 1988, to be one of the four national symbols of the country, along with the Flag, the Coat of Arms and the National Seal. The legal norms currently in force concerning the national anthem are contained in a statute passed in 1971 (Law No. 5,700 of 1 September 1971), regulating the national symbols. This law regulates in great detail the form of the national anthem and how and when it is to be played.

The music of the national anthem was originally intended to be played by symphonic orchestras; for the playing of the anthem by bands, the arrangment of the anthem composed by Antão Fernandes is included in the instrumentation. This adaptation, long in use, was made official by the 1971 statute regulating national symbols. This same statute also confirmed as official the traditional vocal adaptation of the lyrics of the national anthem, in F major, composed by Alberto Nepomuceno.

Due to the fact that the traditional vocal adaptation composed by Alberto Nepomuceno for Joaquim Osório Duque Estrada's lyrics of the national anthem was made official in 1971, other vocal arrangements (as well as other instrumental arrangements departing from the one recognized in law) are unofficial. Because of that, for the remainder of the Military Dictatorship era (that lasted until 1985), the playing of the anthem with any artistic arrangement that departed from the official orchestration and vocal adaptation was prohibited, and there was strict vigilance regarding the use of the National Symbols and the enforcement of this norm. Since the redemocratization of the country, far greater artistic liberty has been allowed regarding renderings of the national anthem. Singer Fafá de Belém's interpretation of the national anthem (initially criticized during the final days of the Military Dictatorship, but now widely accepted), is an example of that. In any event, although the use of different artistic arrangements for the anthem is now allowed (and although the statutory norms that prohibited such arrangements are no longer enforced, on the grounds of constitutional freedom of expression), a rendering of the national anthem is only considered fully official when the statutory norms regarding the vocal adaptation and orchestration are followed. However, the traditional vocal adaptation composed by Alberto Nepomuceno was so well established by the time it became official that the interpretations of the national anthem that depart from the official orchestration or from the official vocal adaptation are few. Indeed, although other arrangements are now allowed, the traditional form tends to prevail, so that, with few exceptions, even celebrity singers tend to only lend their voices to the singing of the official vocal adaptation by Alberto Nepomuceno.

The anthem is sung in Brazil's official national language, the Portuguese language.

== Lyrics ==
Music Box

Orquestra Philharmonia

The song consists of two consecutive stanzas. The adoption in 1922 of lyrics containing two stanzas thus created the present situation of the music of the anthem being played twice so as to allow for the singing of both stanzas.

The Brazilian law stipulates that the B-flat major music needs to be played only once in instrumental renditions of the anthem without vocal accompaniment (thus, in instrumental renditions without vocal accompaniment, the playing of the music twice is optional), but both stanzas must be sung in F major in vocal performances.

Certain renditions of the anthem exist for sporting events which vary in length and composition. For example, the Olympic Games uses a version where the first and last sections of the first verse are used, followed by the chorus and the ending. Otherwise an official rendition of the anthem consists of the introductory section, the first verse, chorus, and ending. The second stanza is usually omitted from most official occasions.

In the lyrics, the opening line's mention of the Ipiranga river refers to the stream near (and now part of) the city of São Paulo where Prince Dom Pedro, the future Emperor Dom Pedro I of Brazil, declared Brazilian independence from Portugal.

Portuguese lyrics

I
Ouviram do Ipiranga as margens plácidas
De um povo heroico o brado retumbante,
E o sol da liberdade, em raios fúlgidos,
Brilhou no céu da pátria nesse instante.

Se o penhor dessa igualdade
Conseguimos conquistar com braço forte,
Em teu seio, ó liberdade,
Desafia o nosso peito a própria morte!

Ó Pátria amada,
Idolatrada,
Salve! Salve!

Brasil, um sonho intenso, um raio vívido
De amor e de esperança à terra desce,
Se em teu formoso céu, risonho e límpido,
A imagem do Cruzeiro resplandece.

Gigante pela própria natureza,
És belo, és forte, impávido colosso,
E o teu futuro espelha essa grandeza.

Refrão:
Terra adorada,
Entre outras mil,
És tu, Brasil,
Ó Pátria amada!
Dos filhos deste solo és mãe gentil,
Pátria amada, Brasil!

II
Deitado eternamente em berço esplêndido,
Ao som do mar e à luz do céu profundo,
Fulguras, ó Brasil, florão da América,
Iluminado ao sol do Novo Mundo!

Do que a terra, mais garrida,
Teus risonhos, lindos campos têm mais flores;
"Nossos bosques têm mais vida",
"Nossa vida" no teu seio "mais amores." (*)

Ó Pátria amada,
Idolatrada,
Salve! Salve!

Brasil, de amor eterno seja símbolo
O lábaro que ostentas estrelado,
E diga o verde-louro dessa flâmula
– "Paz no futuro e glória no passado."

Mas, se ergues da justiça a clava forte,
Verás que um filho teu não foge à luta,
Nem teme, quem te adora, a própria morte.

Refrão

IPA transcription (Note: See Help:IPA/Portuguese and Portuguese phonology.)

1
[ow.ˈvi.ɾɐ̃w̃ du‿i.pi.ˈɾɐ̃.ɡɐ‿az ˈmaʁ.ʒẽj̃s ˈpla.si.dɐs]
[d͡ʒi‿ũ ˈpo.vu‿e.ˈɾɔj.ku‿u ˈbɾa.du ʁe.tũ.ˈbɐ̃.t͡ʃi |]
[i‿u sɔw da li.beʁ.ˈda.d͡ʒi‿ẽj̃ ˈʁaj.us ˈfuw.ʒi.dus]
[bɾi.ˈʎo(w) nu sɛw da ˈpa.tɾjɐ ˈne.si‿ĩs.ˈtɐ̃.t͡ʃi ǁ]

[si‿u pe.ˈɲoʁ ˈdɛ.sɐ‿i.ɡwaw.ˈda.d͡ʒi]
[kõ.se.ˈɡĩ.mus kõ.kis.ˈta(ʁ) kõ ˈbɾa.su ˈfɔʁ.t͡ʃi |]
[ẽj̃ tew ˈsej.u | ɔ li.beʁ.ˈda.d͡ʒi |]
[de.za.ˈfi.‿u ˈnɔ.su ˈpej.tu‿a ˈpɾɔ.pɾja ˈmɔʁ.t͡ʃi ǁ]

[ɔ ˈpa.tɾjɐ‿a.ˈma.dɐ |]
[i.do.lɐ.ˈtɾa.dɐ |]
[ˈsaw.vi ˈsaw.vi ǁ]

[bɾa.ˈziw ũ ˈso.ɲu‿ĩ.ˈtẽ.su‿ũ ˈʁaj.u ˈvi.vi.du]
[d͡ʒi‿a.ˈmoɾ i d͡ʒi‿es.pe.ˈɾɐ̃.sɐ‿a ˈtɛ.ʁɐ ˈdɛ.si]
[si‿ẽj̃ tew foʁ.ˈmo.zu sɛw ʁi.ˈzõ.j̃u‿i ˈlĩ.pi.du]
[a‿i.ˈma.ʒẽj̃ du kɾu.ˈze(j).ɾu ʁes.plɐ̃.ˈdɛ.si ǁ]

[ʒi.ˈɡɐ̃.t͡ʃi ˈpe.lɐ ˈpɾɔ.pɾja na.tu.ˈɾe.zɐ |]
[ɛ(j)z ˈbɛ.lu‿ɛ(j)s ˈfɔʁ.t͡ʃi‿ĩ.ˈpa.vi.du ko.ˈlo.su |]
[i‿u tew fu.ˈtu.ɾu‿is.ˈpe.ʎɐ‿ɛ.sɐ ɡɾɐ̃.ˈde.zɐ ǁ]

[ɾefɾɐ̃w̃:]
[ˈtɛ.ʁɐ‿a.do.ˈɾa.dɐ |]
[ˈẽ.tɾi‿o(w).tɾɐz ˈmiw |]
[ɛ(j)s tu bɾa.ˈziw ǁ]
[ɔ ˈpa.tɾjɐ‿a.ˈma.dɐ ǁ]
[dus ˈfi.ʎuz ˈdes.t͡ʃi ˈsɔ.lu‿ɛ(j)z mɐ̃j̃ ʒẽ.ˈt͡ʃiw |]
[ˈpa.tɾjɐ‿a.ˈma.dɐ bɾa.ˈziw ǁ]

2
[dej.ˈta.du‿e.tɛʁ.na.ˈmẽ.t͡ʃi‿ẽj̃ ˈbeʁ.su‿is.ˈplẽ.d͡ʒi.du]
[aw sõ du maɾ i‿a lu(j)z du sɛw pɾo.ˈfũ.du |]
[fuw.ˈgu.ɾɐz | ɔ bɾa.ˈziw | flo.ˈɾɐ̃w̃ da‿a.ˈmɛ.ɾi.kɐ |]
[i.lu.mi.ˈna.dʊ‿aw sɔw du ˈno.vu ˈmũ.du ǁ]

[du ki‿a ˈtɛ.ʁɐ majz ɡa.ˈʁi.dɐ]
[tewz ʁi.ˈzõ.j̃uz ˈlĩ.dus ˈkɐ̃.pus tẽj̃ majs ˈflo.ɾis ǁ]
[ˈnɔ.suz ˈbɔs.kis tẽj̃ majz ˈvi.dɐ |]
[ˈnɔ.sɐ ˈvi.dɐ no tew ˈsej.u majz a.ˈmo.ɾis ǁ]

[ɔ ˈpa.tɾjɐ‿a.ˈma.dɐ |]
[i.do.lɐ.ˈtɾa.dɐ |]
[ˈsaw.vi ˈsaw.vi ǁ]

[bɾa.ˈziw | d͡ʒi‿a.ˈmoɾ e.ˈteɾ.nu ˈse.ʒɐ ˈsĩ.bo.lu]
[u ˈla.ba.ɾu ki‿os.ˈtẽ.tɐz is.tɾe.ˈla.du |]
[i ˈd͡ʒi.ɡɐ‿u ˈveʁ.d͡ʒi ˈlo(w).ɾu ˈdɛ.sɐ ˈflɐ̃.mu.lɐ]
[pa(j)z nu fu.ˈtu.ɾu‿i ˈɡlɔ.ɾjɐ no pa.ˈsa.du ǁ]

[ma(j)s si‿eʁ.ɡez da ʒus.ˈt͡ʃi.sɐ‿a ˈkla.vɐ ˈfɔʁ.t͡ʃi |]
[ve.ˈɾas ki‿ũ ˈfi.ʎu tew nɐ̃w̃ ˈfɔ.ʒi‿a ˈlu.tɐ |]
[nẽj̃ ˈtẽ.mi kẽj̃ t͡ʃi‿a.ˈdo.ɾɐ‿a ˈpɾɔ.pɾja ˈmɔʁ.t͡ʃi ǁ]

[ʁefɾɐ̃w̃:]

English translation

I
The placid shores of the Ipiranga heard,
the resounding shout of a heroic people.
And the sun of Liberty in shining beams,
shone in the homeland's sky at that instant.

If the pledge (Note: Used metaphorically (figuratively). Penhor dessa igualdade is the guarantee, the security that there will be freedom.) of this equality
we managed to conquer with strong arm,
in thy bosom, O Freedom,
our chest defieth death itself!

O beloved,
idolized homeland,
Hail, hail!

Brazil, an intense dream, a vivid ray
of love and hope to earth descendeth.
If in thy beautiful, smiling and limpid sky,
the image of the [Southern] Cross blazeth.

Giant by thine own nature,
Thou art beautiful, strong, a fearless colossus, (Note: Colosso is the name of a statue of enormous dimensions. Impávido, being "fearless", is to be relaxed, calm.)
And thy future mirrors that greatness

Chorus:
Adored land
Amongst a thousand others
art thou, Brazil,
O beloved homeland
Of the sons of this ground
Thou art kind mother
Beloved homeland, Brazil!

II
Eternally lying on a splendid cradle,
to the sound of the sea and in the light of the deep sky.
Thou flashest, o Brazil, crocket of America,
illuminated by the sun of the New World.

Than the most ostentatious land,
thy smiling, beautiful meadows have more flowers.
"Our forests have more life,"
"Our life" in thy bosom "more loves".

O beloved,
idolized homeland,
Hail, hail!

Brazil, of eternal love, may
the starry ensign which thou displayest be a symbol.
And may the laurel-green of this pennon say:
"Peace in the future and glory in the past."

But if thou raisest the strong cudgel (Note: Clava is a big stick, used in hand-to-hand combat, a cudgel, a mace, or a club. In verse, it means mobilizing an army, to go to war.) of justice,
thou shalt see that a son of thine fleeth not from battle,
nor do those who love thee fear death itself (Note: Alternatively: their own death).

Chorus

(*) The passages in quotation marks were extracted from Gonçalves Dias' poem "Canção do exílio".

== See also ==
- "Brazilian Flag Anthem" (Portuguese: Hino à Bandeira)
- "Brazilian Anthem of Independence" (Portuguese: Hino da Independência)
- "Brazilian Republic Anthem" (Portuguese: Hino da Proclamação da República)
