= Raimundo Correia =

Brazilian poet and judge (1859–1911)

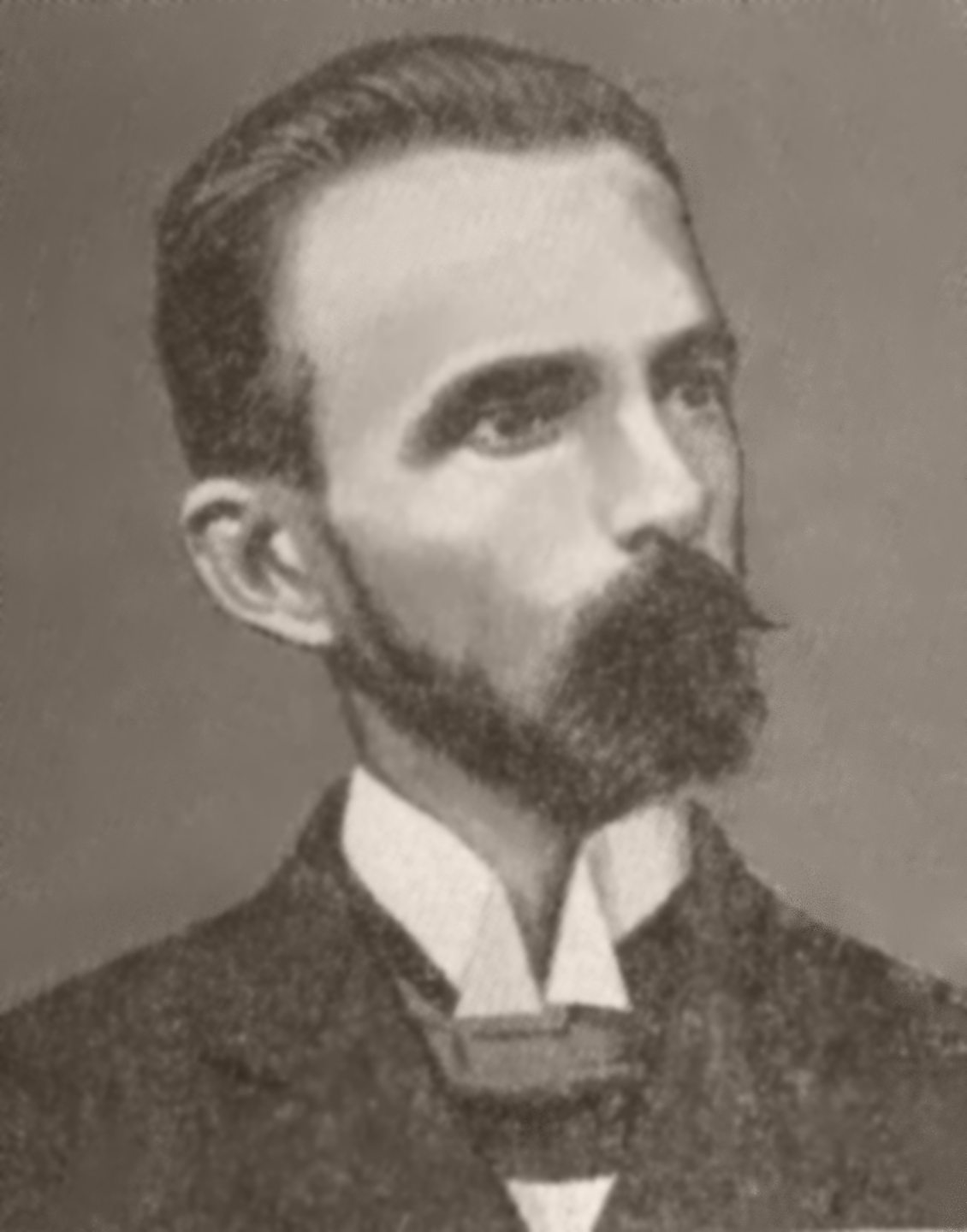
- Born: Raimundo da Mota de Azevedo Correia; 13 May 1859; São Luís, Brazil
- Died: 13 September 1911 (aged 52); Paris, France
- Education: University of São Paulo
- Occupations: Poet, judge, magistrate
- Writing career
- Notable work: Primeiros Sonhos
- Movement: Parnassianism

Raimundo da Mota de Azevedo Correia (13 May 1859 – 13 September 1911) was a Brazilian Parnassian poet, judge and magistrate. Alongside Alberto de Oliveira and Olavo Bilac, he was a member of the "Parnassian Triad".

He founded and occupied the 5th chair of the Brazilian Academy of Letters from 1897 until his death in 1911.

== Life ==
Correia was born on a ship anchored in the shores of São Luís, Maranhão, to desembargador José da Mota de Azevedo Correia and Maria Clara Vieira da Mota de Azevedo Correia. Correia made his secondary course at the Colégio Pedro II, and graduated in Law in 1882, at the Faculdade de Direito da Universidade de São Paulo. He would serve as a successful judge in Rio de Janeiro and Minas Gerais.

Correia's first book, Primeiros Sonhos, was published in 1879, and its poems are strongly influenced by Brazilian Romantic poets such as Fagundes Varela, Casimiro de Abreu and Castro Alves. However, he would join Parnassianism in 1883, with his book Sinfonias. Some of his poems are also considered to forerun the Symbolist movement in Brazil.

Correia died in 1911 in Paris while he was searching for a treatment for his diseases.

== Bibliography ==
- Primeiros Sonhos (1879)
- Sinfonias (1883)
- Versos e Versões (1887)
- Aleluias (1891)
- Poesias (1898)

| Preceded by Bernardo Guimarães (patron) | Brazilian Academy of Letters - Occupant of the 5th chair 1897 — 1911 | Succeeded by Oswaldo Cruz |
