= Raul Pompeia =

Brazilian writer (1863–1895)

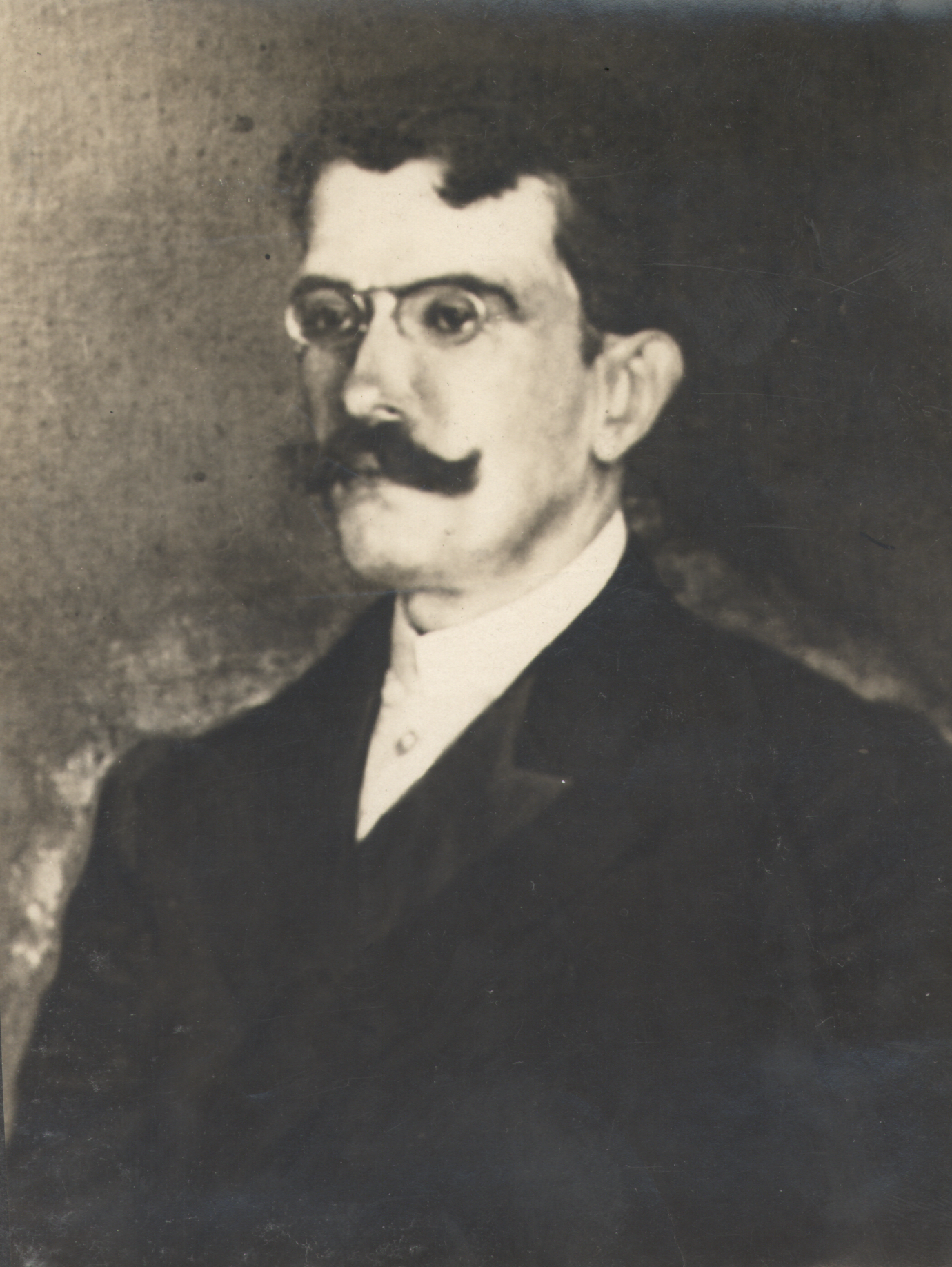
- Born: Raul d'Ávila Pompeia; 12 May 1863; Angra dos Reis, Rio de Janeiro, Empire of Brazil
- Died: 25 December 1895 (aged 32); Rio de Janeiro, Rio de Janeiro, Brazil
- Occupations: Novelist, short story writer, chronicler
- Writing career
- Pen name: Rapp
- Notable work: O Ateneu
- Movements: Realism; Naturalism; Impressionism

Raul d'Ávila Pompeia (April 12, 1863 – December 25, 1895) was a Brazilian novelist, short story writer and chronicler. He is famous for the Impressionist romance O Ateneu. He was the original patron of the 33rd chair of the Brazilian Academy of Letters.

Towards the end of his life, Pompeia had severed ties with a number of former friends. Feeling himself scorned everywhere, he committed suicide by shooting himself in the chest with a pistol on Christmas Day 1895.

== Biography ==
Pompeia was born in 1863 to Antônio d'Ávila Pompeia and Rosa Teixeira Pompeia. As a young man, he entered the Colégio Abílio, run by Abílio César Borges, the Baron of Macaúbas, where he was a good student, and the editor of the school journal O Archote. In 1879, he was transferred to Colégio Pedro II, where he wrote his first book, Uma Tragédia no Amazonas.

In 1881 he moved to São Paulo in order to graduate in law. There he was influenced by abolitionist and republican ideals, and befriended abolitionist Luís Gama. He wrote for many journals of São Paulo and Rio de Janeiro, frequently using the pen name Rapp, although he had many others, including Pompeu Stell, Um moço do povo, Lauro, Fabricius, Raul D. and Raulino Palma. He published his book Canções Sem Metro and the novel As Joias da Coroa in the Jornal do Commercio. After being reproved in 1883, he moved to Recife and there he concluded his Law course. Returning once more to Rio de Janeiro, he wrote his masterpiece O Ateneu in 1888.

After the Lei Áurea (transl. Golden Law) − which ended slavery in Brazil − was approved, Pompeia dedicated himself exclusively to the republican movement. After the republic was proclaimed in Brazil, he became a Mythology teacher in the Escola Nacional de Belas Artes and director of the National Library of Brazil, being named for both positions by Brazilian president Floriano Peixoto. However, as a die-hard supporter of Peixoto, he was subsequently fired from his post by president Prudente de Morais, towards whom he was charged with disrespect in a speech he made at the burial of Floriano Peixoto, who had died suddenly shortly after the end of his presidential term.

Pompeia had already been personally slandered for his allegedly closet homosexuality — something which led him to challenge his former friend, the poet Olavo Bilac, to a duel in 1892; he had also broken other friendships in the same dramatic fashion. Eventually, he suffered a breakdown: after being slandered for his Floriano speech in a piece by journalist Luís Murat entitled "A Madman in the Cemetery", feeling himself scorned everywhere, he committed suicide by shooting himself in the chest with a pistol on Christmas Day 1895.

== Works ==
- Uma Tragédia no Amazonas (1880)
- As Joias da Coroa (1882)
- Canções Sem Metro (1883)
- O Ateneu (1888)

== Translations ==
- The Athaeneum. Evanston: Northwestern University Press, 2015.
