= Francisco de Paula Ney =

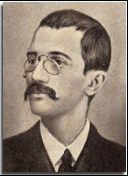
- A photograph depicting Ney
- Born: 2 February 1858; Aracati, Ceará, Brazil
- Died: 13 November 1897 (aged 39); Rio de Janeiro City, Rio de Janeiro, Brazil
- Occupations: Poet, journalist
- Writing career
- Literary movement: Parnassianism

Francisco de Paula Ney (February 2, 1858 – November 13, 1897) was a Brazilian poet and journalist. A pre-eminent figure of the bohemian Rio de Janeiro of the Belle Époque, he was a friend of Coelho Neto, Aluísio Azevedo and Olavo Bilac. He was a poet famous for writing anonymous satires and jokes for the journals where he worked.
