= As Joias da Coroa =

As Joias da Coroa is a novel written by the Brazilian writer Raul Pompeia. It was first published in 1882. It has been published in Portuguese and Italian.
