= Brazilian Republic Anthem =

Brazilian patriotic song commemorating the Proclamation of the Republic

Vocal
Anthem to the Proclamation of the Republic performed by the Brazilian Army choir.

The Brazilian Republic Anthem, also known as the Anthem of the Proclamation of the Republic (Portuguese: Hino da Proclamação da República), is a Brazilian song commemorating the Proclamation of the Republic in 15 November 1889. It was composed by Leopoldo Miguez with lyrics by Medeiros e Albuquerque. It was published in an official document on 21 January 1890.

== Lyrics ==
Seja um pálio de luz desdobrado,
Sob a larga amplidão destes céus.
Este canto rebel, que o passado
Vem remir dos mais torpes labéus!
Seja um hino de glória que fale
De esperanças de um novo porvir!
Com visões de triunfos embale
Quem por ele lutando surgir!

Chorus:
Liberdade! Liberdade!
Abre as asas sobre nós,
Das lutas na tempestade
Dá que ouçamos tua voz

Nós nem cremos que escravos outrora
Tenha havido em tão nobre País...
Hoje o rubro lampejo da aurora
Acha irmãos, não tiranos hostis.
Somos todos iguais! Ao futuro
Saberemos, unidos, levar
Nosso augusto estandarte que, puro,
Brilha, avante, da Pátria no altar!

Chorus

Se é mister que de peitos valentes
Haja sangue em nosso pendão,
Sangue vivo do herói Tiradentes
Batizou neste audaz pavilhão!
Mensageiro de paz, paz queremos,
É de amor nossa força e poder,
Mas da guerra, nos transes supremos
Heis de ver-nos lutar e vencer!

Chorus

Do Ipiranga é preciso que o brado
Seja um grito soberbo de fé!
O Brasil já surgiu libertado,
Sobre as púrpuras régias de pé.
Eia, pois, brasileiros avante!
Verdes louros colhamos louçãos!
Seja o nosso País triunfante,
Livre terra de livres irmãos!

Chorus

Translation:

May this rebel song be an unfurled mantle of light
Under the vastness of these skies,
This rebel song that comes to redeem
Our past from inglorious deeds!
May this be a glorious anthem that speaks
Of hopes of new beginnings
To inspire with visions of triumph those
who in the future shall come forward to defend it!

Chorus:
Freedom! Freedom!
Above us spread thy wings.
Through the struggles in the storm
Grant that we hear thy voice.

We cannot believe that in another age
Slaves there were in so noble a country.
Now the rosy glow of dawn
Greets brothers, and not hostile tyrants.
We are all equal! In the future, united,
We will know how to take up
Our august banner that, pure,
Glows triumphant from the altar of the fatherland!

Chorus

If it is to be that from brave chests
Our banner will be bloodied
The living blood of the hero Tiradentes (Note: an 18th-century fighter for independence)
Baptized this bold flag!
Messenger of peace, it is peace for which we yearn,
From love comes our force and power
But in war, in the greatest ordeals
You shall see us struggling and victorious!

Chorus

May the shout from the Ipiranga (Note: the place where Brazilian independence was declared)
Be a defiant cry of faith!
Brazil sprang forth already free,
Standing above the purple vestments of royalty.
So then, forward Brazilians!
May we harvest shining green laurels!
May our country be triumphant,
A free land of free brothers!

Chorus

== In popular culture ==
- In 1989, a samba school from Rio de Janeiro, GRES Imperatriz Leopoldinense won the Rio Carnival contest with the samba-enredo "Liberdade, Liberdade, abre as asas sobre nós!", an homage to the Chorus of this anthem.

== See also ==
- Brazilian National Anthem
- Brazilian Flag Anthem
- Brazilian Anthem of Independence
