= A Capital Federal =

Operetta directed by Artur Azevedo

A Capital Federal is an operetta whose text was written by Brazilian writer Artur Azevedo. It was first published in 1897, the same year of its premiere. Besides being Azevedo's most popular play, it is perhaps the most popular Brazilian play ever and was also the first to be performed outside Brazil.

In the operetta, a country landowner and his family arrive in Rio de Janeiro in search of the daughter's fiancé, Gouveia. They are overwhelmed by the city's chaos, its sexual temptations, and its then-current affectation for French culture, and taken advantage of by city residents such as Lola, the Spanish courtesan, and Figueiredo, the procurer. At the end, the family finds Gouveia and returns to their home in Minas Gerais, and the landowner realizes that Brazil's prosperity comes from the honest labor to be found in the country, rather than from city life and frivolity.

In 1923, it was made into a film, directed by Luiz de Barros.
