= Osório Duque-Estrada =

Brazilian poet, essayist, journalist, literary critic and professor

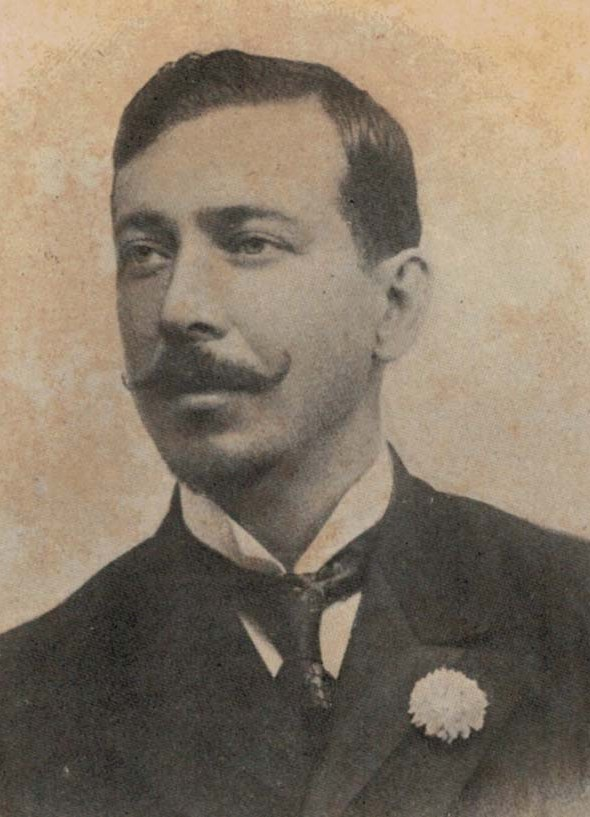
- A photograph of Duque-Estrada
- Born: Joaquim Osório Duque-Estrada; 19 April 1870; Paty do Alferes, Rio de Janeiro, Empire of Brazil
- Died: 5 February 1927 (aged 56); Rio de Janeiro City, Rio de Janeiro, Brazil
- Education: University of São Paulo
- Occupations: Poet; essayist; literary critic; professor; journalist
- Relatives: Manuel Luís Osório
- Writing career
- Notable work: Brazilian National Anthem
- Movement: Parnassianism

Joaquim Osório Duque-Estrada (19 April 1870 – 5 February 1927) was a Brazilian poet, historian, essayist, journalist, literary critic and professor. He is famous for writing in 1909 a poem that would become the lyrics of the Brazilian National Anthem in 1922.

He occupied the 17th chair of the Brazilian Academy of Letters (ABL) from 1915 until his death in 1927.

== Early life and education ==
Duque-Estrada was born in Paty do Alferes, on 19 April 1870, to Lieutenant Colonel Luís de Azeredo Coutinho Duque-Estrada and Mariana Delfim Duque-Estrada. His godfather was Manuel Luís Osório, the Marquess of Herval. He was sent to the Colégio Pedro II in 1882, graduating in Letters in 1888. Two years before, he published his first poetry book, Alvéolos (Alveoli).

== Career ==
In 1887 he started to write for journals, such as A Cidade do Rio, collaborating with José do Patrocínio. In 1888 he started to defend the proclamation of the Republic in Brazil, alongside Antônio da Silva Jardim. In 1889 he moved to São Paulo in order to study at the Faculdade de Direito da Universidade de São Paulo, but would abandon the Law school in 1891 to become a diplomat. He would serve as a secretary in Paraguay, staying there for one year.

Later abandoning the diplomatic career, he became a professor at the Colégio Pedro II, but would quit his position to dedicate himself to journalism again, working as a literary critic at the Jornal do Brasil. His articles would be compiled and published in 1924, by the name of Crítica e Polêmica.

== Death ==
He died on 5 February 1927, at the age of 56.

== Works ==
- Alvéolos (1886)
- A Aristocracia do Espírito (1889)
- Flora de Maio (1902)
- O Norte (1909)
- Anita Garibaldi (1911)
- A Arte de Fazer Versos (1912)
- Dicionário de Rimas Ricas (1915)
- A Abolição (1918)
- Crítica e Polêmica (1924)

Preceded by Sílvio Romero (founder)	Brazilian Academy of Letters – Occupant of the 17th chair 1915–1927	Succeeded by Edgar Roquette-Pinto
