= Brazilian Flag Anthem =

Flag anthem of Brazil

Hino à Bandeira Nacional
English: "Hymn to the National Flag"
- Flag anthem of Brazil
- Also known as: (English: "Brazilian Flag Anthem")
- Lyrics: Olavo Bilac, 1906
- Music: Francisco Braga, 1906
- Adopted: November 9, 1906; 119 years ago

Audio sample
- Performed by the Brazilian Ministry of Education: file; help

The "Brazilian Flag Anthem" (Portuguese: Hino à Bandeira Nacional, lit. 'Hymn to [the] National Flag') is a Brazilian patriotic song dedicated to the national flag of Brazil.

== History ==
The song's lyrics were written by poet Olavo Bilac, and the music composed by Francisco Braga, at the request of the then mayor of Rio de Janeiro, Francisco Pereira Passos. The anthem was presented for the first time on November 9, 1906, and was originally intended to be sung by the schoolchildren of Rio de Janeiro during flag replacement ceremonies in city schools (hence the reference to "youthful chest" in the lyrics). It was considered as a possible replacement for the Brazilian National Anthem, which at that time had no official lyrics.

The Flag Anthem, as with all other patriotic anthems and songs, was highly praised in the past, especially during the military dictatorship of 1964 to 1985, but has since lost some of its appeal. It is still sung on November 19 (Flag Day), as well as during flag replacement ceremonies.

== Protocol ==
Flag replacement ceremonies are held in military institutions, in schools, etc., and periodically also at the Praça dos Três Poderes in the capital Brasília. These usually consist of the Flag Anthem being played while the old flag is lowered, and the National Anthem being played while the new flag is raised. In the case of perpetual displays of the flag, wherein it is always flown without even minimal interruptions (such as at the Praça dos Três Poderes) the new flag is raised first while the national anthem is played, and only then the old flag is lowered while the Flag Anthem is sung.

== Lyrics ==
Portuguese lyrics

I
Salve, lindo pendão da esperança!
Salve, símbolo augusto da paz!
Tua nobre presença à lembrança
A grandeza da Pátria nos traz.

Refrão
Recebe o afeto que se encerra
Em nosso peito juvenil,
Querido símbolo da terra,
Da amada terra do Brasil!

II
Em teu seio formoso retratas
Este céu de puríssimo azul,
A verdura sem par destas matas,
E o esplendor do Cruzeiro do Sul.

Refrão

III
Contemplando o teu vulto sagrado,
Compreendemos o nosso dever,
E o Brasil por seus filhos amado,
Poderoso e feliz há de ser!

Refrão

IV
Sobre a imensa nação brasileira,
Nos momentos de festa ou de dor,
Paira sempre, sagrada bandeira,
Pavilhão da justiça e do amor!

Refrão

English translation

I
Hail, precious banner of hope!
Hail, august symbol of peace!
Thy noble presence to our minds
The greatness of our motherland does bring.

Chorus
Take the affection enclosed
In our youthful chest,
Dear symbol of the land,
Of the beloved land of Brazil!

II
In thy beauteous bosom thou portrayest
This sky of purest blue,
The peerless greenness of these forests,
And the splendor of the Southern Cross.

Chorus

III
Beholding thy sacred shadow,
We understand our duty,
And Brazil, loved by its children,
Powerful and happy shall be!

Chorus

IV
Over the immense Brazilian Nation,
In times of happiness or grief,
Hover always, o sacred flag,
Pavilion of justice and love!

Chorus

== See also ==
- "Brazilian National Anthem"
- "Brazilian Republic Anthem" (Portuguese: Hino da Proclamação da República)
- Hino da Independência
- Flag of Brazil
