= O Ateneu =

Book by Raul Pompeia

The Athenaeum
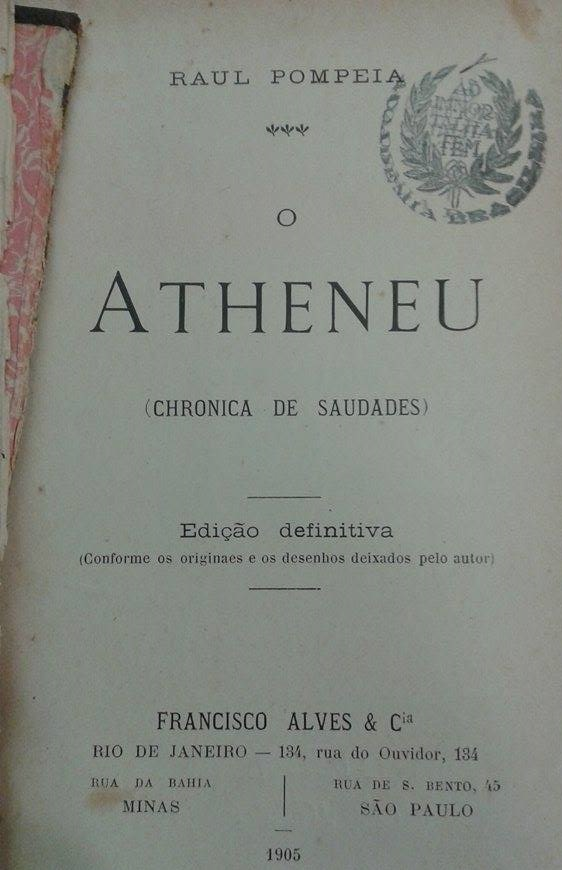
- Second edition of O Ateneu in 1950. This is the “definitive edition”, printed in Paris, in partnership with the publisher Tipografia Aillaud & Cie
- Author: Raul Pompeia
- Original title: O Ateneu
- Language: Portuguese
- Genre: Naturalism; Impressionism; Realism
- Publication date: 1888
- Publication place: Brazil
- Media type: Print (Hardback & Paperback)
- ISBN: 0-8101-3079-3

O Ateneu (English: The Athenaeum) is an 1888 novel written by the Brazilian author Raul Pompeia. It is considered one of the most prominent examples of Brazilian Naturalism, Impressionism and Realism. The book narrates, in the first person, the story of Sérgio, an eleven-year-old boy who is sent to a well-respected all-male boarding school—known as the Athenaeum, hence the book's title—by his father. The school has very strict rules imposed by its headmaster—Aristarco—which cause a general sense of riot amongst the students; homosexuality is common amongst most students, which is partially explained due to the presence of just one woman in the school—the nurse and wife of Aristarco, Dona Ema—and the lack of contact with the external world.

== Plot introduction ==
The general concept of the novel is that of describing the leaving of one's childhood dreams behind, and the consequences which come from growing up and having to face life. The main character, Sérgio, is commonly accepted as being an alter ego of Pompeia at a younger age.

== Plot summary ==
Sérgio is left at the age of eleven on the doorsteps of the Ateneu by his father and enters the school for the first time. It immediately becomes clear the sexual references by the headmaster's statement to Sérgio's father in the beginning of the book: "You should see a coiffeur, and cut this blondy hair of yours. You know, the pretty boys in this school, don't go along very well". After, he is eventually approached by two older students—Sanches and Bento Alves—who try to engage into a homosexual relationship with him, but he does not accept the proposal. Sérgio then approaches a rebellious boy named Franco in order to avoid their company. Since Franco is constantly disciplined by the headmaster, Sérgio cuts his friendship with the boy, out of fear of facing the same fate. He then meets a boy named Egbert and becomes very close to him; their relationship does not develop beyond friendship mostly due to the sexual and emotional feelings Sérgio nourishes for the school's nurse—Dona Ema. Towards the end of the book, a student sets fire to the Ateneu, burning the whole structure down. The fire is a metaphor which represents the end of a chapter in Sérgio's life, as he progresses towards maturity.

== Selected passages ==
1. Portuguese: "Vais encontrar o mundo, disse-me meu pai, à porta do Ateneu. Coragem para a luta! Bastante experimentei depois a verdade daquele aviso, que me despia, num gesto, das ilusões de criança educada exoticamente na estufa de carinho que é o regime do amor doméstico, diferente do que se encontra fora, tão diferente, que parece o poema dos cuidados maternos um artifício sentimental, com a vanatagem única de fazer mais sensível a criatura à impressão rude do primeiro ensinamento, têmpera busca da vitalidade na influência de um novo clima rigoroso."
  English: "You will meet the world, said my father, at the doorsteps of the Ateneu. Get courage for the fight! I later experienced the truth of that warning, which undressed me, in one gesture, of the illusions of a child educated exotically in the greenhouse of tenderness which is the regime of domestic love, different from what is found outside, so different, that it makes the poem of the maternal love seem to be a sentimental artifice, with the only advantage of making the creature more sensitive to the rude impression of the first teaching, burning search for vitality under the influence of a harsh new weather."
