= Alberto de Oliveira =

Brazilian poet, pharmacist and professor

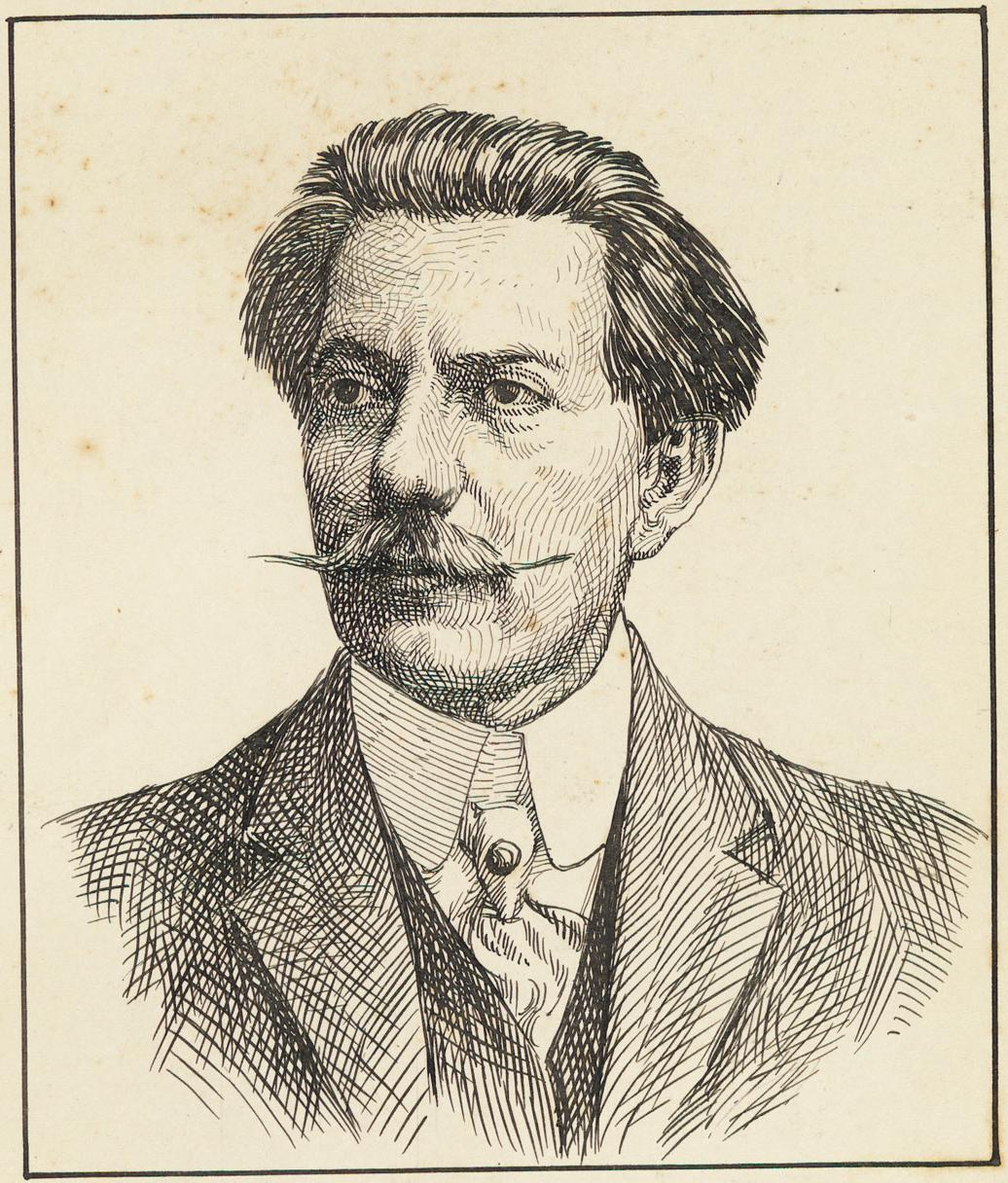
- Born: Antônio Mariano de Oliveira; April 28, 1857; Saquarema, Rio de Janeiro, Brazil
- Died: January 19, 1937 (aged 79); Niterói, Rio de Janeiro, Brazil
- Occupations: Poet, professor, pharmacist
- Writing career
- Notable work: Poesias
- Movement: Parnassianism

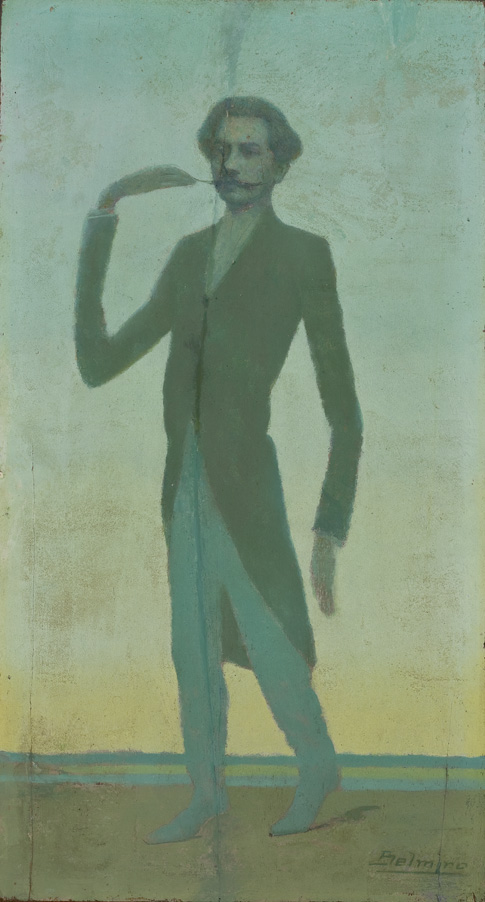
A caricature of Alberto de Oliveira, by Belmiro de Almeida.

Antônio Mariano de Oliveira (April 28, 1857 – January 19, 1937) was a Brazilian poet, pharmacist and professor. He is better known by his pen name Alberto de Oliveira.

Alongside Olavo Bilac and Raimundo Correia, he comprised the Brazilian "Parnassian Triad".

He founded and occupied the 8th chair of the Brazilian Academy of Letters from 1897 until his death in 1937.

Preceded by Cláudio Manuel da Costa (patron)	Brazilian Academy of Letters - Occupant of the 8th chair 1897 — 1937	Succeeded by Oliveira Viana
