= O Mulato =

- Author: Aluísio de Azevedo
- Language: Portuguese
- Genre: Naturalism
- Publication date: 1881
- Publication place: Brazil

O Mulato (English: The Mulatto) is a novel written by the Brazilian writer Aluísio de Azevedo. It was first published in 1881 and represents the beginning of Brazilian Naturalism. The movement peaked at the end of the 19th century, and sought to portray reality in a raw and objective way, often focusing on less explored aspects of society. Aluísio de Azevedo was one of the precursors of this movement in Brazil, and the work is often cited as one of the first naturalist novels in the country. O Mulato denounces the racial discrimination of the late nineteenth century society of the Brazilian state of São Luís, Maranhão. The book was one of the first literary works in Brazil to openly discuss interracial relationships and their social and cultural implications.

The novel follows the life of Raimundo da Silva, a young mixed-race man of humble origins who longs to climb the social ladder and find his place in the high society of his father, a Portuguese immigrant. The story addresses the challenges Raimundo faces due to his racial background, including prejudice and discrimination. The plot becomes even more complicated when Raimundo falls in love with his cousin Ana Rosa, a young white woman from high society. The relationship between the two is marked by challenges and racial tensions, reflecting the complex social dynamics of the time.
