= National Seal of Brazil =

Versions
- Colored seal
- Armiger: Federative Republic of Brazil
- Adopted: 19 November 1899; 126 years ago
- Motto: Ordem e Progresso (Order and Progress)
- Use: Graduation diplomas, consular and diplomatic papers, etc.

The National Seal of Brazil (Portuguese: Selo Nacional do Brasil) is one of Brazil's national symbols, displayed on several official documents, such as graduation diplomas, consular and diplomatic papers, military conscription forms, etc. The Seal does not commonly appear on most documents, and the National Coat of Arms is usually seen instead.

== History ==
=== Imperial period ===
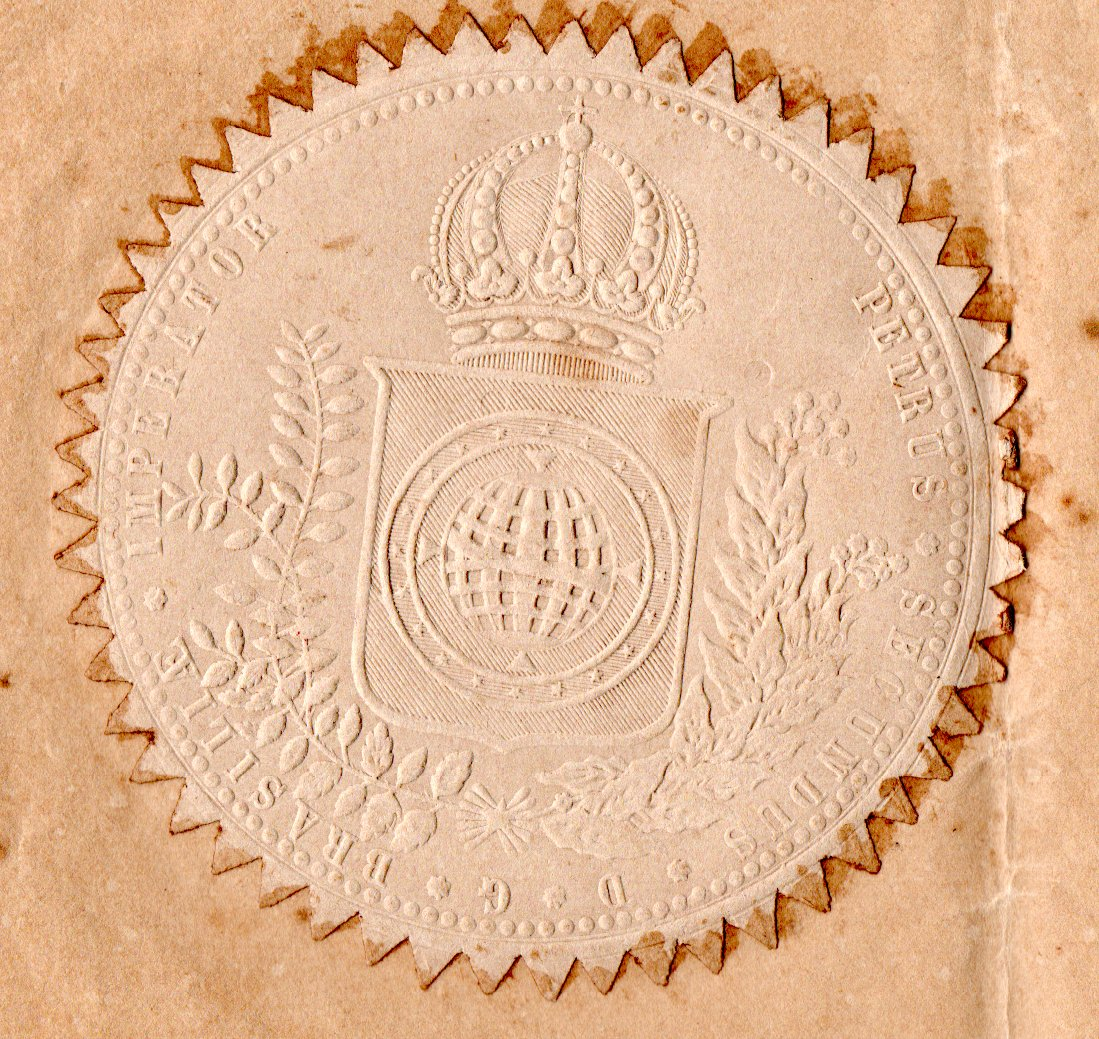
A national stamp of 1871

The use of seal in official documents derives from the Imperial period, in which a relief stamp in the shape of the imperial coat of arms was used. This was packed in a wrapper and commonly made with sayings in Latin or in Portuguese about the Emperor, for example: “Pedro II, Constitutional Emperor of Brazil” or “Pedro II, Perpetual Defender of Brazil”. The seal of the Imperial era was created by the ministerial notice signed by Luís Pereira da Nóbrega de Sousa Coutinho on October 24, 1822.

=== Republic ===
The design of the National Seal is also represented on the reverse side of the Great Seal of the Arms of the Federative Republic of Brazil (that bears the image of the country's coat of arms on the obverse side), and is used by the Presidency of the Republic to authenticate solemn documents together with the President's signature, such as instruments of ratification of international treaties.

The wax or printed impression of the National Seal is also used to authenticate the original version of Laws promulgated by the President of Brazil.

The National Seal, together with the nation's flag, anthem and coat of arms, is officially recognised as a national symbol since the Brazilian Republic was formed; its appearance and design is regulated by law.
