= Coelho Neto =

Brazilian writer and politician (1864–1934)

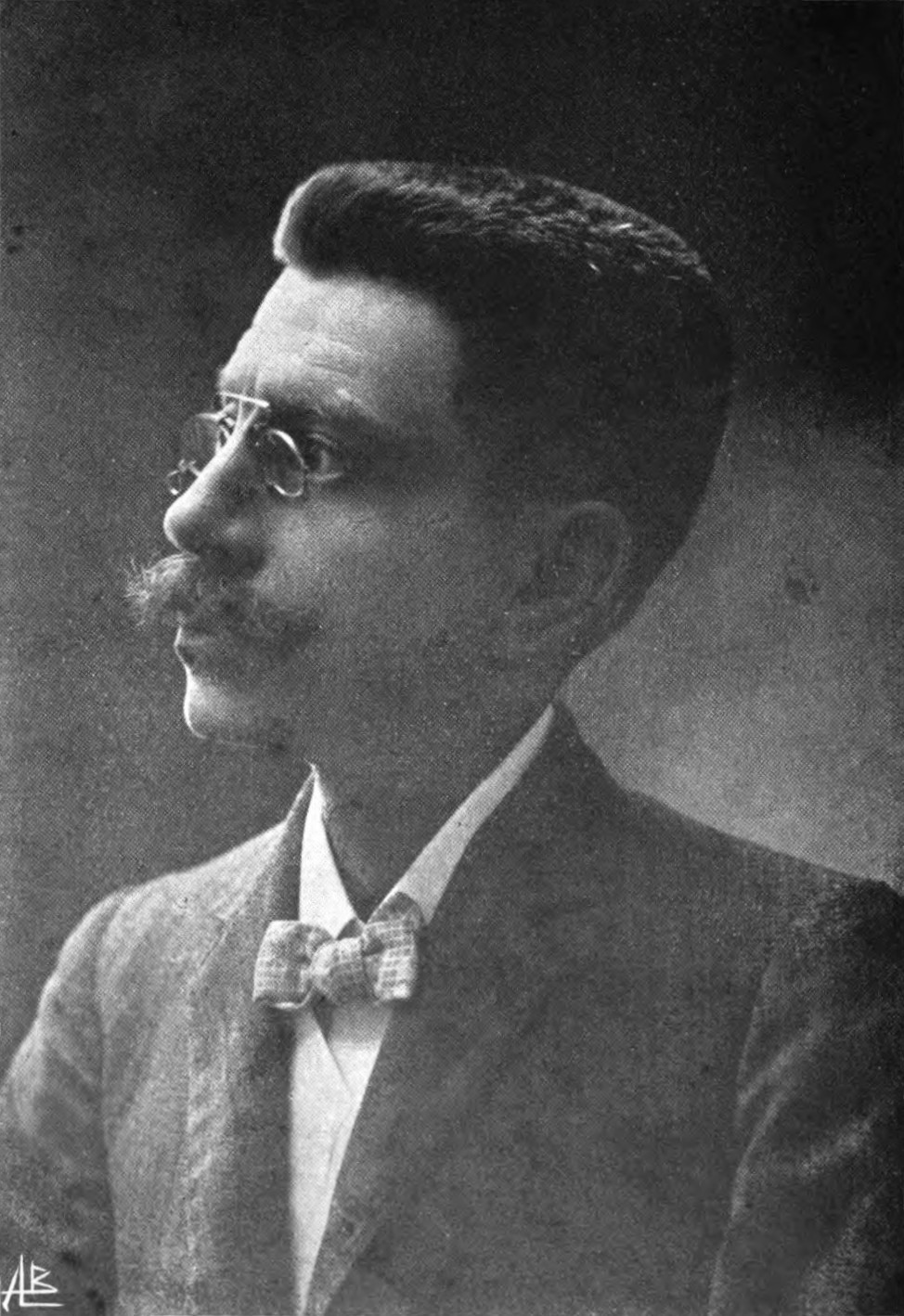
- Neto, c. 1900
- Born: Henrique Maximiano Coelho Neto; February 20, 1864; Caxias, Maranhão, Brazil
- Died: November 28, 1934 (aged 70); Rio de Janeiro, Rio de Janeiro, Brazil
- Education: University of São Paulo
- Occupations: Playwright, short story writer, novelist, politician, journalist, literary critic
- Spouse: Maria Gabriela Brandão
- Children: João Coelho Neto

Henrique Maximiano Coelho Neto (February 20, 1864 – November 28, 1934) was a Brazilian writer and politician. He founded and occupied the second chair of the Brazilian Academy of Letters, from 1897 until his death in 1934. He was also the president of the aforementioned Academy in 1926.

== Life ==
Coelho Neto was born in the city of Caxias, Maranhão, on February 20, 1864. His father was Portuguese, and his mother was an indigenous woman, Ana Silvestre Coelho. At six years of age, his parents moved to Rio de Janeiro. He began his education at the Externato of the Colégio Pedro II. He attempted medical school but soon gave up. In 1883 he enrolled at the University of São Paulo School of Law, living in the boarding house where also lived Raul Pompeia, who attended the Academy of São Paulo at that time. He soon found himself involved in a student movement against a professor. In anticipation of reprisals, he moved to the Law Faculty of Recife, where he completed the first year of law, having been a student of the jurist and poet Tobias Barreto. Returning to São Paulo, he devoted himself passionately to the abolitionist and Republican campaign, an attitude that led to new frictions with the University of São Paulo School of Law. In 1885 he finally abandoned his legal studies and moved to Rio de Janeiro.

He became part of a group of bohemians that included figures such as Olavo Bilac, Luís Murat, Guimarães Passos and Francisco de Paula Ney. The history of this generation appears later in his novels A Conquista and Fogo Fátuo, dedicated to his friend Francisco de Paula Ney, a brilliant orator and journalist known for his bohemian life style and his famous anecdotes. He joined the newspaper Gazeta da Tarde, later moving to the sheet Cidade do Rio, where he held the position of secretary. From this period date his first published volumes.

He was also a practitioner of the Afro-Brazilian martial art of capoeira. On August 6, 1888, a speech by Quintino Bocaiuva was attacked by hitmen led by an infamous street capoeirista named Benjamim, but Neto, who was in attendance, disarmed and submitted him.

In 1890, he married Maria Gabriela Brandão, daughter of educator Alberto Olympio Brandão. They had 14 children. One of those was the famous football player João Coelho Neto (known as "Preguinho").

He was appointed to the post of secretary of the government of the state of Rio de Janeiro and the following year, director of State Affairs. In 1892 he was appointed professor of art history at the Escola Nacional de Belas Artes (National School of Fine Arts) and, later, professor of literature at the Colégio Pedro II. Author of numerous books, articles, stories and serials, he was appointed professor of history of theater and dramatic literature at the Escola de Arte Dramática (Drama School) in 1910, and soon after director of the same institution.

He was elected congressman for Maranhão in 1909 and was reelected in 1917. He was also secretary-general of the League of National Defense and a member of the Advisory Board of the Municipal Theater of Rio de Janeiro.

In addition to holding public office, Coelho Neto maintained and intensified his activities in magazines and newspapers of all sizes, in Rio and other cities. In addition to signing works with his own name, he wrote under numerous pseudonyms, including Anselmo Ribas, Caliban, Ariel, Amador Santelmo, Blanco Canabarro, Charles Rouget, Democ, N. Puck, Tartarin, Fur-Fur and Manés.

In 1923, he converted to Spiritism, delivering a speech about his adoption of the spiritual doctrine in the Salão da Velha Guarda (Hall of the Old Guard) in Rio de Janeiro.

He was active in virtually all literary genres and was for many years the most widely read writer in Brazil. He wrote what could have been the first Brazilian serial movie, The Mysteries of Rio de Janeiro. However, only the first episode was ever completed.

He was probably the most widely read Brazilian writer in the first decades of the twentieth century. However, he and his work were attacked by the Modernists during the Modern Art Week (or Semana de Arte Moderna, in Portuguese) in 1922 and this probably contributed to his later neglect by publishers and the Brazilian public.

== Works ==
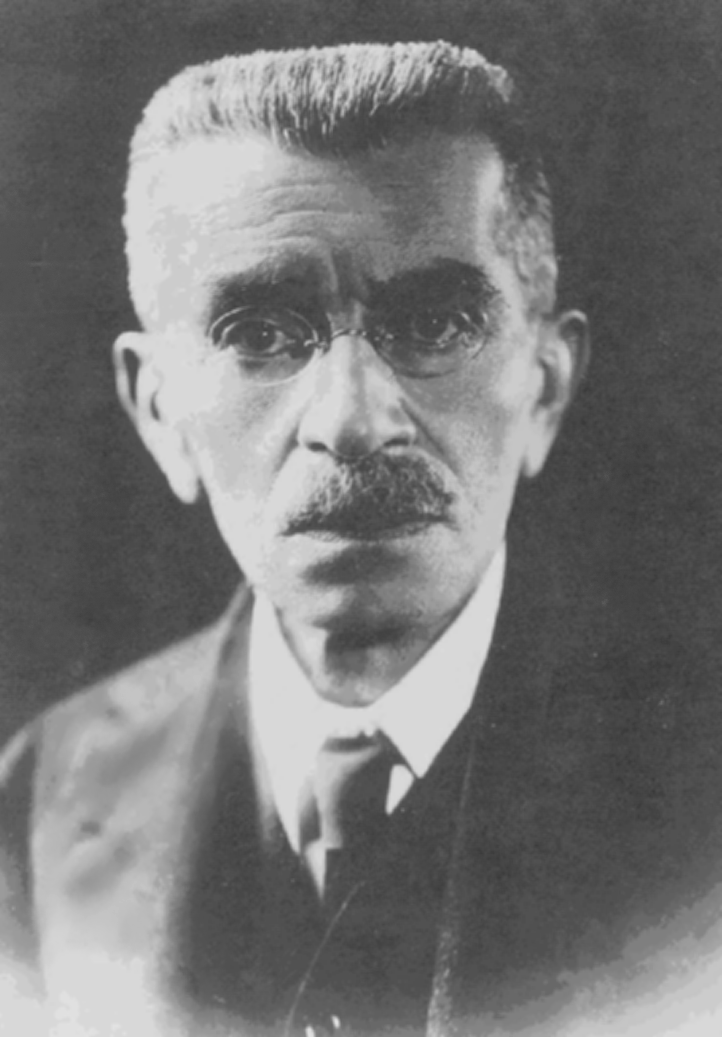
Coelho Neto

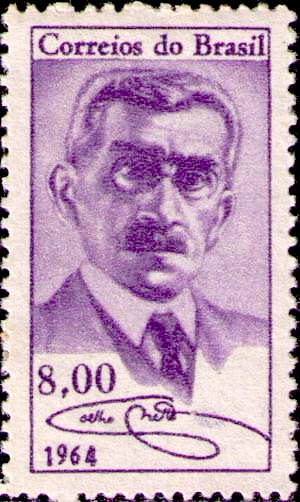
Coelho Neto on a 1964 stamp

- Romance Bárbaro (1914)
- O Mistério (1920)
- Fogo fátuo, romance, (1929)
- Álbum de Caliban, contos, (1897)
- Contos da vida e da morte, contos, (1927)
- Mano, Livro da Saudade, romance, (1924)
- A cidade maravilhosa, contos, (1928)
- O polvo, romance (1924)
- A descoberta da Índia, narrativa histórica, (1898)
- O Fruto, contos, (1895)
- O rei fantasma, romance, (1895)
- O Rajá de Pendjab (1898)
- Rapsódias, contos, (1891)
- Sertão (1897)
- A Bico de Penna
- Água de Juventa, contos,
- Romanceiro (1898)
- Theatro, vol. I – Os Raios X (1897), O Relicário (1899), O Diabo no corpo(1899)
- Theatro, vol. II – As Estações, Ao Luar, Ironia, A Mulher, Fim de Raça (1900)
- Theatro, vol. IV – Quebranto (1908), comédia em 3 actos, e o sainete Nuvem
- Theatro, vol. V – O dinheiro, Bonança (1909), e o Intruso
- Fabulário
- O Arara, (1905)
- Jardim das Oliveiras, (1908)
- Esfinge, romance, 1908
- Inverno em Flor, romance, (1897)
- Apólogos, contos para crianças
- Miragem, romance, (1895)
- Mysterios do Natal, contos para crianças
- O Morto, Memórias de um Fuzilado, romance, (1898)
- Rei Negro (1914)
- Capital Federal, Impressões de um Sertanejo, romance, (1893)
- A Conquista, romance, (1899)
- Tormenta, romance, (1901)
- Tréva
- Banzo, contos, (1913)
- Turbilhão (1904)
- O meu dia
- As Sete Dores de Nossa Senhora
- Balladilhas, contos, (1894)
- Pastoral
- Vida Mundana, contos, (1919)
- Patinho torto (1917)
- Às quintas
- Scenas e perfis
- Feira livre
- Immortalidade, lenda, romance, (1926)
- O Paraíso (1898)
- Bazar
- Fogo Fátuo (1930)
- fogo de vista (1923)
- Theatro lyrico
- os pombos
- Teatrinho (1905), collection of dramatic texts for children, in collaboration with Olavo Bilac
- Teatro infantil, date unknown, new collection with the same theme

Preceded by Álvares de Azevedo (patron)	Brazilian Academy of Letters – Occupant of the 2nd chair 1897–1934	Succeeded by João Neves da Fontoura

Preceded by Afrânio Peixoto	President of the Brazilian Academy of Letters; 1926	Succeeded by Rodrigo Otávio
