= Leopoldo Miguez =

Brazilian composer

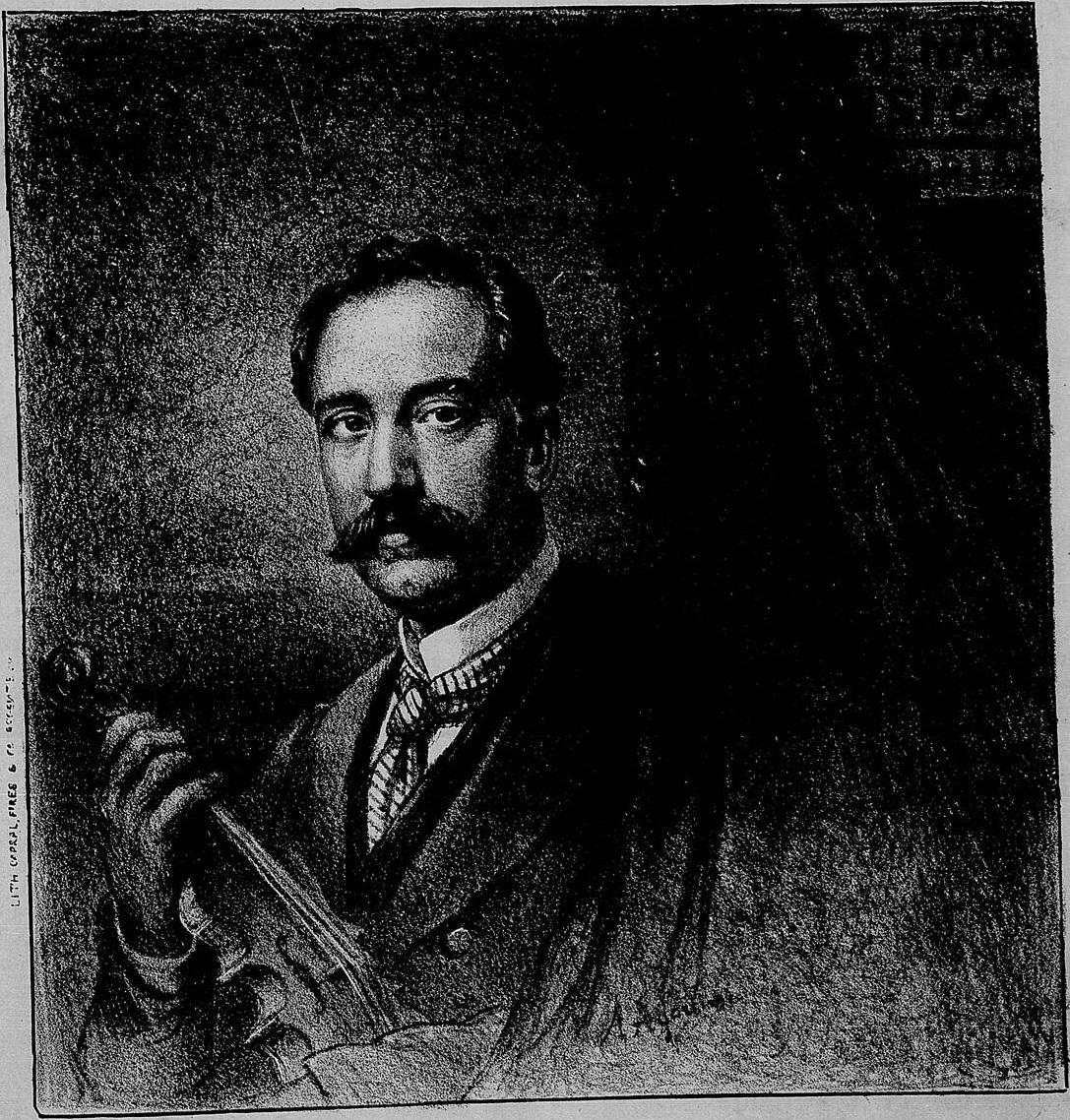
Leopoldo Miguez.

Leopoldo Américo Miguez (9 September 1850 – 6 July 1902) was a Brazilian composer.

Miguez was born in Niterói. He was known as a champion of the music of Richard Wagner. He also directed the Instituto Nacional de Musica. He also wrote the music for Brazil's Hymn for the Proclamation of the Republic. He died in Rio de Janeiro.
