= Impressionism (literature) =

Movement in literature

Literary impressionism can be defined as when an author centers their story or attention on the character's mental life such as the character's impressions, feelings, sensations or emotions. To broaden the scope of what impressionistic literature is, it can be identified by the following attributes: ambiguous meaning (character motivation, themes, or narration is up to reader interpretation), non-chronological narrative, strategic selection of details (to convey the impressions left by an incident or scene), emotional landscape (a focus on how the events of the scene affect the narrator), and personal point-of-view (a particular character's subjective perception of events). With personal point-of-view the edges of reality are blurred by choosing points of view that lie outside the norm, which is reminiscent of the Impressionist art movement and Monet's blurry style.

== Influence ==
Literary impressionism was influenced by the European Impressionist art movement which sought to reject established styles; as such, many writers adopted a style that relied on breaking conventions. Much of what has been called "impressionist" literature is subsumed into several other categories, especially Modernism and Symbolism. Why literary impressionism is subsumed into other categories may have to do with the overlap in timeframe. As for Modernism and Impressionism, both began in the late 19th century and continued into the 20th century, mirroring their artistic counterparts.

== Usage ==
Since much of literary impressionism is subsumed into other categories, the most well-accepted examples of impressionistic literature are from widely known modernists and symbolists. Joseph Conrad (Heart of Darkness and The Lagoon), Aleksey Remizov (The Indefatigable Tambourine), and Virginia Woolf (Mrs. Dalloway) are among those examples. Although there is debate on whether or not Virginia Woolf was an Impressionist, her famed work Mrs. Dalloway had impressionistic scenes, chiefly, the airplane scene which is an example that scholars use today. The airplane scene gives readers a broad view of characters and their feelings while forcing the reader to battle with the disconnect between what they see and what they know. This scene holds two tenets of Impressionism, ambiguity and emotional landscape.
