= O Cortiço =

1890 novel by Aluísio Azevedo

- Author: Aluísio Azevedo
- Language: Portuguese
- Genre: Naturalism
- Publication place: Brazil
- ISBN: 0-19-512187-2

O Cortiço ('The Slum') is an influential Brazilian novel written in 1890 by Aluísio Azevedo. The novel depicts a part of Brazil's culture in the late 19th century, represented by a variety of colorful characters living in a single Rio de Janeiro tenement. It is written with the intention of belonging to the Realism movement leaning towards Naturalism, much like Flaubert's Madame Bovary.

Azevedo's The Slum tells the stories of Portuguese and other European immigrants, mulattos, and former African slaves living and working together in a single community. It explores the author's intensely naturalistic beliefs, having various characters being defined and changed by their environment, race and social position.

Examples are: the division between the unenthusiastic, yet passionate, mulattos and the hard-working, driven Portuguese immigrants, how the climate and culture of Brazil can slowly transform these immigrants' behavior in atavistic ways. In addition, the role of women is a key theme, with all female characters in one way or another revealing their purpose in the slum.

In 2013, the book became a musical on Brazilian Broadway starring Gabriel Boni Rodrigues and Rafael Morelli. Today the play is with Daniel Tupauan and Christian Coronel.
