= Aluísio Azevedo =

Brazilian writer and diplomat (1857–1913)

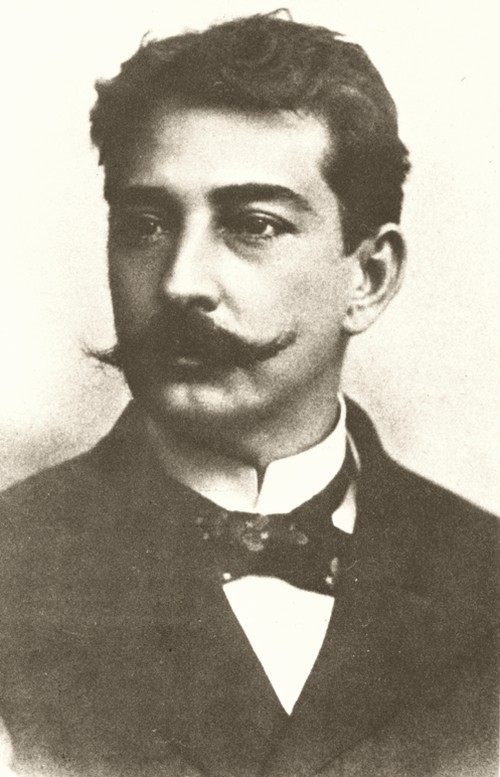
- Born: 14 April 1857; São Luís, Maranhão, Empire of Brazil
- Died: 21 January 1913 (aged 55); Buenos Aires, Argentina
- Occupations: Short story writer, playwright, novelist, diplomat, caricaturist
- Relatives: Artur Azevedo
- Writing career
- Period: 1879–1897
- Notable works: O Cortiço, O Mulato, Casa de Pensão
- Movements: Romanticism; Naturalism

Aluísio Tancredo Gonçalves de Azevedo (Portuguese pronunciation: [aluˈizju tɐ̃ˈkɾedu ɡõˈsawviz dʒi azeˈvedu]; 14 April 1857 – 21 January 1913) was a Brazilian novelist, caricaturist, diplomat, playwright and short story writer. Initially a Romantic writer, he would later adhere to the Naturalist movement. He introduced the Naturalist movement in Brazil with the novel O Mulato, in 1881. He founded and occupied the 4th chair of the Brazilian Academy of Letters from 1897 until his death in 1913.

== Biography ==
Azevedo was born in São Luís, to David Gonçalves de Azevedo (the Portuguese vice-consul in Brazil) and Emília Amália Pinto de Magalhães. He was the younger brother of the famous playwright Artur Azevedo.

As a child, Aluísio would work as a traveling salesman. Following this, due to his love of painting and drawing, he would move to Rio de Janeiro in 1876 (where his brother Artur was living already), to study at the Escola Nacional de Belas Artes. After graduating, he drew caricatures for journals such as O Fígaro, O Mequetrefe, Zig-Zag and A Semana Illustrada.

His father's death, in 1878, made him return to São Luís, in order to take care of his family. He then initiated his writer career, publishing in 1880 a typical Romantic novel, Uma Lágrima de Mulher. He helped on the creation of an anticlerical journal named O Pensador, where he wrote Abolitionist articles. In 1881 he publishes the first Brazilian Naturalist novel ever: O Mulato, that deals with the themes of racism. Consolidating his career as a writer, he could return to Rio.

He would write endlessly during the period of 1882–1895. Also dating from this period are his famous novels Casa de Pensão (1884) and O Cortiço (1890), as well as many other works written in partnership with his brother or with Émile Rouède.

In 1895 he became a diplomat. He served as a minister in Spain, Japan, England, Italy and Argentina, where he died.

== Works ==
=== Novels ===
- Uma Lágrima de Mulher (A Woman's Tear) (1880)
- O Mulato (The Mulatto) (1881)
- Mistérios da Tijuca, ou Girândola de Amores (Tijuca's Mystery, or the Girony of Lovers) (1882)
- Memórias de um Condenado, ou A Condessa Vésper (Memoirs of a Fatedmen, or the Vesper Countess) (1882)
- Casa de Pensão (Pension House) (1884)
- Filomena Borges (1884)
- O Homem (The Man) (1887)
- O Cortiço (The Slum) (1890)
- O Coruja (The Owl) (1890)
- A Mortalha de Alzira (The Shroud of Alzira) (1894)
- O Livro de uma Sogra (A Mother-in-law Book) (1895)

=== Theatre plays ===
- Os Doidos (The Madmen) (1879)
- Flor-de-lis (Fleur-de-lis) (1882)
- Casa de Orates (Prayers House) (1882)
- O Caboclo (The Caboclo) (1886)
- Fritzmack (1889 – in partnership with Artur Azevedo)
- A República (The Republic) (1890)
- O Adultério (The Adultery) (1891)
- Em Flagrante (In Flagrant) (1891)

=== Miscellaneous ===
- O Japão (Japan) (chronicles – 1894)
- Demônios (Devils) (short stories – 1895)

Preceded by Basílio da Gama (patron)	Brazilian Academy of Letters – Occupant of the 4th chair 1897–1913	Succeeded by Alcides Maia
