= Olavo Bilac =

Brazilian Parnassian poet, journalist and translator

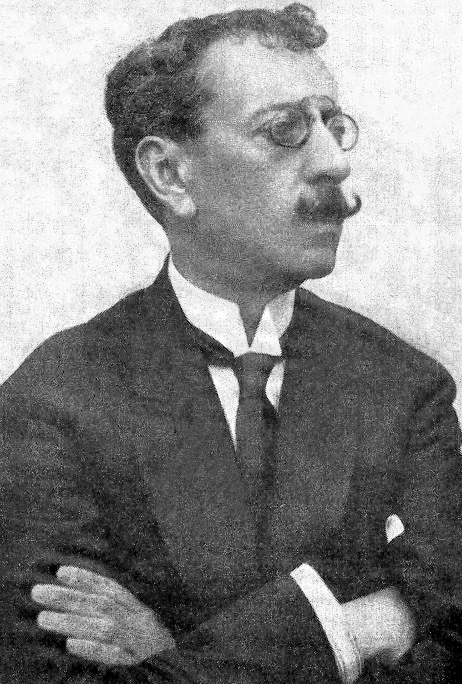
- Bilac, c. 1895
- Born: Olavo Brás Martins dos Guimarães Bilac; 16 December 1865; Rio de Janeiro, Empire of Brazil
- Died: 28 December 1918 (aged 53); Rio de Janeiro, Brazil
- Education: Faculdade de Medicina da Universidade Federal do Rio de Janeiro
- Occupations: Poet, journalist, translator
- Writing career
- Notable works: Poesias; Brazilian Flag Anthem
- Movement: Parnassianism

Olavo Brás Martins dos Guimarães Bilac (16 December 1865 – 28 December 1918), known simply as Olavo Bilac (Portuguese pronunciation: [oˈlavu biˈlak(i)]), was a Brazilian Parnassian poet, journalist and translator. Alongside Alberto de Oliveira and Raimundo Correia, he was a member of the "Parnassian Triad". He was elected the "Prince of Brazilian Poets" in 1907 by the magazine Fon-Fon. He wrote the lyrics of the Brazilian Flag Anthem.

He founded and occupied the 15th chair of the Brazilian Academy of Letters from 1897 until his death in 1918. He is also the patron of the military service in Brazil due to his campaigns in favor of conscription.

== Life ==
Bilac was born in Rio de Janeiro to Brás Martins dos Guimarães Bilac and Delfina Belmira Gomes de Paula. As a young man, he was a brilliant student, enrolling in the school of medicine at the Federal University of Rio de Janeiro at the age of 15.

He began studying medicine, but did not finish the course. He also tried to study law at the Faculdade de Direito da Universidade de São Paulo but did not finish that course either. Instead, he found pleasure in writing and in journalism.

His first work was the sonnet "Sesta de Nero" ("Nero's Nap") in the newspaper Gazeta de Notícias in 1884, which received praise from Artur Azevedo.

In addition to poetry, Bilac wrote publicity texts, chronicles, schoolbooks, children's poetry and satirical works. In 1891, he was arrested at the Fortaleza da Laje in Rio de Janeiro for opposing the government of Floriano Peixoto.

In 1897, Bilac lost control of his car, crashing it into a tree. He was the first person to suffer a car accident in Brazil.

Bilac never married and never had children. He was engaged to Amélia de Oliveira, the sister of the poet Alberto de Oliveira, but their engagement was short-lived since it was opposed by another brother of Amélia, who said Bilac had no future. He had an even shorter engagement to Maria Selika, daughter of violinist Francisco Pereira da Costa, but a legend says that Amélia was very faithful to Bilac: she never married, and, when Bilac died, she put a lock of her hair in his coffin.

Bilac died in 1918. His last words were, "Give me coffee! I'm going to write!"

== Bibliography ==
- Poesias (1888)
- O Esqueleto (1890 – in partnership with Pardal Mallet)
- Crônicas e Novelas (1894)
- Crítica e Fantasia (1904)
- Conferências Literárias (1906)
- Tratado de Versificação (1910 – in partnership with Guimarães Passos)
- Dicionário de Rimas (1913 – in partnership with Guimarães Passos)
- Ironia e Piedade (1916)

Bilac also translated, into Portuguese, Wilhelm Busch's Max and Moritz as As Travessuras de Juca e Chico (Juca and Chico's Pranks).

== Popular culture ==
Bilac was portrayed by Rui Minharro in the 1999 miniseries Chiquinha Gonzaga, and gives his name to a character portrayed by Carlos Alberto Riccelli in the 2006 film Brasília 18%, directed by Nelson Pereira dos Santos.

Preceded by Gonçalves Dias (patron)	Brazilian Academy of Letters – Occupant of the 15th chair 1897–1918	Succeeded by Amadeu Amaral
