= List of members of the Brazilian Academy of Letters =

This list contains the 40 seats and their respective patrons, founders and members of Academia Brasileira de Letras.

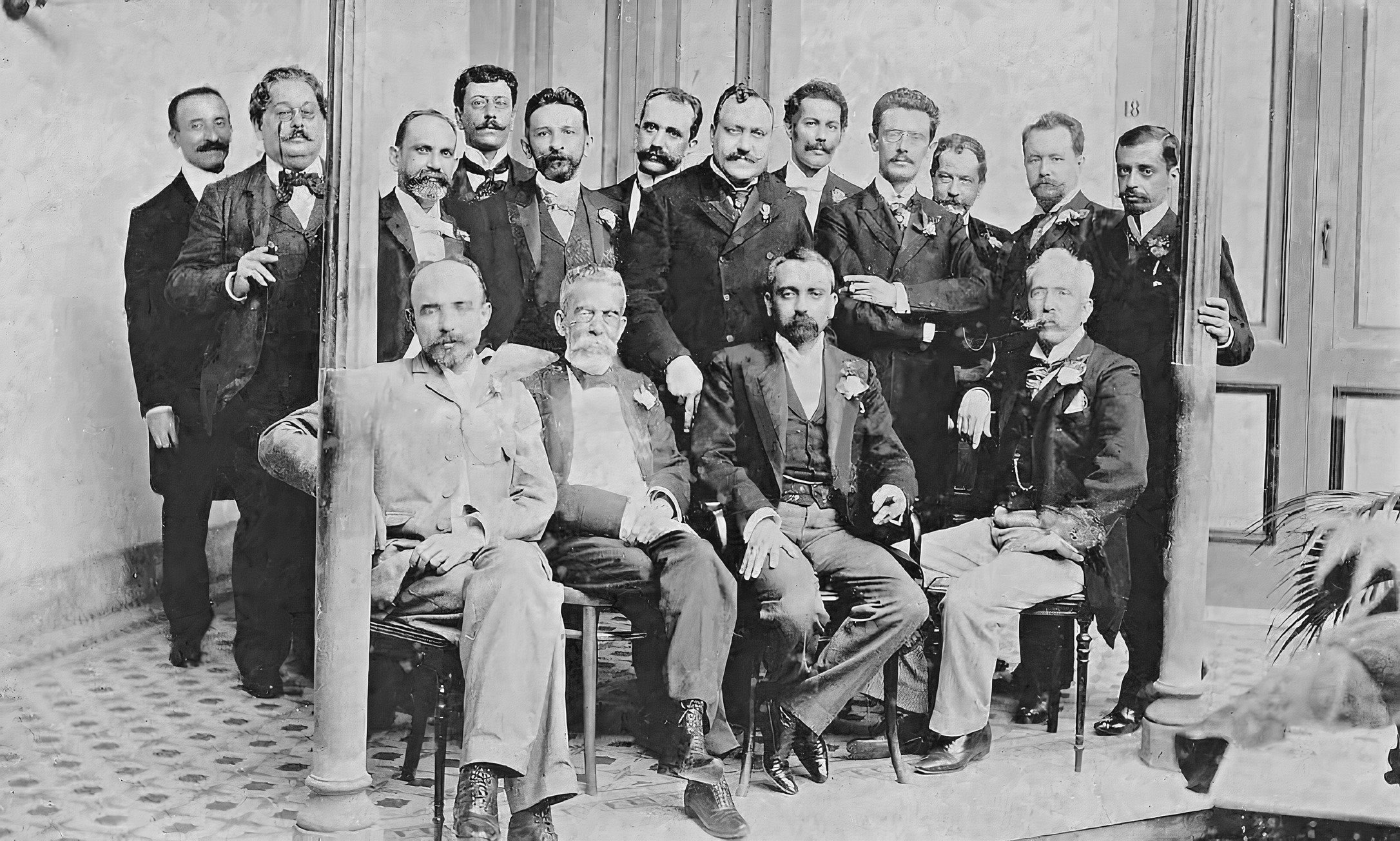
"A Panelinha"; standing: Rodolfo Amoedo, Artur Azevedo, Inglês de Sousa, Olavo Bilac, José Veríssimo, Sousa Bandeira, Filinto de Almeida, Guimarães Passos, Valentim Magalhães, Rodolfo Bernadelli, Rodrigo Octavio and Heitor Peixoto; sitting: João Ribeiro, Machado de Assis, Lúcio de Mendonça and Silva Ramos.

Chair	Patron	Founder	Successors
1	Adelino Fontoura	Luís Murat	Afonso d'Escragnolle Taunay; Ivan Lins; Bernardo Élis; Evandro Lins e Silva; Ana Maria Machado
2	Álvares de Azevedo	Coelho Neto	João Neves da Fontoura; Guimarães Rosa; Mário Palmério; Tarcísio Padilha
3	Artur de Oliveira	Filinto de Almeida	Roberto Simonsen; Aníbal Freire da Fonseca; Herberto Sales; Carlos Heitor Cony
4	Basílio da Gama	Aluísio Azevedo	Alcides Maia; Viana Moog; Carlos Nejar
5	Bernardo Guimarães	Raimundo Correia	Oswaldo Cruz; Aloísio de Castro; Cândido Mota Filho; Rachel de Queiroz; José Murilo de Carvalho
6	Casimiro de Abreu	Teixeira de Melo	Artur Jaceguai; Goulart de Andrade; Barbosa Lima Sobrinho; Raimundo Faoro; Cícero Sandroni
7	Castro Alves	Valentim Magalhães	Euclides da Cunha; Afrânio Peixoto; Afonso Pena Júnior; Hermes Lima; Pontes de Miranda; Diná Silveira de Queirós; Sérgio Correia da Costa; Nelson Pereira dos Santos
8	Cláudio Manoel da Costa	Alberto de Oliveira	Oliveira Viana; Austregésilo de Ataíde; Antônio Calado; Antônio Olinto; Cleonice Berardinelli
9	Gonçalves de Magalhães	Carlos Magalhães de Azeredo	Marques Rebelo; Carlos Chagas Filho; Alberto da Costa e Silva
10	Evaristo da Veiga	Ruy Barbosa	Laudelino Freire; Osvaldo Orico; Orígenes Lessa; Lêdo Ivo; Rosiska Darcy de Oliveira
11	Fagundes Varela	Lúcio de Mendonça	Pedro Lessa; Eduardo Ramos; João Luís Alves; Adelmar Tavares; Deolindo Couto; Darcy Ribeiro; Celso Furtado; Hélio Jaguaribe
12	França Júnior	Urbano Duarte	Antônio Augusto de Lima; Vítor Viana; José Carlos de Macedo Soares; Abgar Renault; Dom Lucas Moreira Neves; Alfredo Bosi
13	Francisco Otaviano	Visconde de Taunay	Francisco de Castro; Martins Júnior; Sousa Bandeira; Hélio Lobo; Augusto Meyer; Francisco de Assis Barbosa; Sérgio Paulo Rouanet
14	Franklin Távora	Clóvis Beviláqua	Carneiro Leão; Fernando de Azevedo; Miguel Reale; Celso Lafer
15	Gonçalves Dias	Olavo Bilac	Amadeu Amaral; Guilherme de Almeida; Odilo Costa Filho; Dom Marcos Barbosa; Padre Fernando Bastos de Ávila; Marco Lucchesi
16	Gregório de Matos	Araripe Júnior	Félix Pacheco; Pedro Calmon; Lygia Fagundes Telles
17	Hipólito da Costa	Sílvio Romero	Osório Duque-Estrada; Roquette-Pinto; Álvaro Lins; Antônio Houaiss; Affonso Arinos de Mello Franco; Fernanda Montenegro
18	João Francisco Lisboa	José Veríssimo	Barão Homem de Melo; Alberto Faria; Luís Carlos; Pereira da Silva; Peregrino Júnior; Arnaldo Niskier
19	Joaquim Caetano	Alcindo Guanabara	Dom Silvério Gomes Pimenta; Gustavo Barroso; Silva Melo; Américo Jacobina Lacombe; Marcos Almir Madeira; Antonio Carlos Secchin
20	Joaquim Manuel de Macedo	Salvador de Mendonça	Emílio de Meneses; Humberto de Campos; Múcio Leão; Aurélio de Lira Tavares; Murilo Melo Filho; Gilberto Gil
21	Joaquim Serra	José do Patrocínio	Mário de Alencar; Olegário Mariano; Álvaro Moreyra; Adonias Filho; Dias Gomes; Roberto Campos; Paulo Coelho
22	José Bonifácio the Younger	Medeiros e Albuquerque	Miguel Osório de Almeida; Luís Viana Filho; Ivo Pitanguy
23	José de Alencar	Machado de Assis	Lafayette Rodrigues Pereira; Alfredo Pujol; Otávio Mangabeira; Jorge Amado; Zélia Gattai; Luiz Paulo Horta; Antônio Torres
24	Júlio Ribeiro	Garcia Redondo	Luís Guimarães Filho; Manuel Bandeira; Ciro dos Anjos; Sábato Magaldi; Geraldo Carneiro
25	Junqueira Freire	Franklin Dória	Artur Orlando da Silva; Ataulfo de Paiva; José Lins do Rego; Afonso Arinos de Melo Franco; Alberto Venancio Filho
26	Laurindo Rabelo	Guimarães Passos	Paulo Barreto; Constâncio Alves; Ribeiro Couto; Gilberto Amado; Mauro Mota; Marcos Vilaça
27	Antônio Peregrino Maciel Monteiro	Joaquim Nabuco	Dantas Barreto; Gregório da Fonseca; Levi Carneiro; Otávio de Faria; Eduardo Portella
28	Manuel Antônio de Almeida	Inglês de Sousa	Xavier Marques; Menotti Del Picchia; Oscar Dias Correia; Domício Proença Filho
29	Martins Pena	Artur Azevedo	Vicente de Carvalho; Cláudio de Sousa; Josué Montello; José Mindlin; Geraldo Holanda Cavalcanti
30	Pardal Mallet	Pedro Rabelo	Heráclito Graça; Antônio Austregésilo; Aurélio Buarque de Holanda Ferreira; Nélida Piñon
31	Pedro Luís Pereira de Sousa	Guimarães Júnior	João Ribeiro; Paulo Setúbal; Cassiano Ricardo; José Cândido de Carvalho; Geraldo França de Lima; Moacyr Scliar; Merval Pereira
32	Manuel de Araújo Porto-Alegre	Carlos de Laet	Ramiz Galvão; Viriato Correia; Joracy Camargo; Genolino Amado; Ariano Suassuna; Evaldo Cabral de Mello
33	Raul Pompéia	Domício da Gama	Fernando Magalhães; Luís Edmundo; Afrânio Coutinho; Evanildo Cavalcante Bechara
34	Sousa Caldas	Pereira da Silva	Barão do Rio Branco; Lauro Müller; Dom Aquino Correia; Magalhães Júnior; Carlos Castelo Branco; João Ubaldo Ribeiro; Zuenir Ventura
35	Tavares Bastos	Rodrigo Otávio	Rodrigo Otávio Filho; José Honório Rodrigues; Celso Cunha; Cândido Mendes
36	Teófilo Dias	Afonso Celso	Clementino Fraga; Paulo Carneiro; José Guilherme Merquior; João de Scantimburgo; Fernando Henrique Cardoso
37	Tomás Antônio Gonzaga	Silva Ramos	Alcântara Machado; Getúlio Vargas; Assis Chateaubriand; João Cabral de Melo Neto; Ivan Junqueira; Ferreira Gullar
38	Tobias Barreto	Graça Aranha	Santos Dumont; Celso Vieira; Maurício Campos de Medeiros; José Américo de Almeida; José Sarney
39	Francisco Adolfo de Varnhagen	Oliveira Lima	Alberto de Faria; Rocha Pombo; Rodolfo Garcia; Elmano Cardim; Otto Lara Resende; Roberto Marinho; Marco Maciel; José Paulo Cavalcanti
40	Visconde do Rio Branco	Eduardo Prado	Afonso Arinos; Miguel Couto; Alceu Amoroso Lima; Evaristo de Moraes Filho; Edmar Bacha
