= Celso Vieira (writer) =

Brazilian lawyer (1878–1954)

Celso Vieira de Matos Melo Pereira
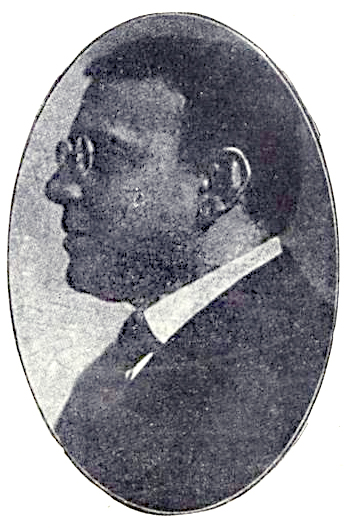
- Celso Vieira de Matos Melo Pereira (1919)
- Born: January 12, 1878; Recife, Pernambuco, Brazil
- Died: December 19, 1954 (aged 76); Rio de Janeiro, Brazil
- Occupations: Writer, biographer, historian
- Writing career
- Notable work: Founding member of the Pernambuco Academy of Letters

Celso Vieira de Matos Melo Pereira (1878–1954) was a Brazilian writer, biographer and historian. He was born in the city of Recife, PE, on January 12, 1878. He was the son of Rafael Francisco Pereira and Marcionila Vieira de Melo Pereira. He did his first studies at Ginásio Pais Leme in Pará, where he also started the law course that he concluded in Rio de Janeiro. He held a series of public positions in Rio. He was one of the founders of the Pernambuco Academy of Letters.

He occupied chair no. 38, of the Brazilian Academy of Letters, in the vacancy resulting from the death of Santos Dumont who incidentally had not taken office. He was received by academician Aloísio de Castro on May 5, 1934. He in turn received academician Vítor Viana. He presided over the Brazilian Academy in 1940. He was succeeded by the physician and professor Maurício de Medeiros.

He died in Rio de Janeiro, RJ, on December 19, 1954.
