= Tarcísio Padilha =

Brazilian philosopher (1928–2021)

Tarcísio Meirelles Padilha (17 April 1928 – 9 September 2021) was a Brazilian philosopher, professor, and chairman of the Brazilian Academy of Letters. He was born in Rio de Janeiro, Brazil, on 17 April 1928, the son of Raymundo Delmiriano Padilha and D. Mayard Meirelles Padilha. In 1951, he married Ruth Maria Fortuna Padilha, and the couple has six children.

== Biography ==
Padilha attended the Grupo Escolar D. Pedro II in Petrópolis, the Colégio Nossa Senhora Auxiliadora in Campinas, and completed his secondary education at the Colégio Santo Inácio. He graduated in Philosophy and Law from the Pontifical Catholic University of Rio de Janeiro, having also studied at the Escola Superior de Guerra and the Universidade Federal Fluminense. He obtained his PhD in Philosophy from the State University of Rio de Janeiro. He has taught Philosophy at the State University of Rio de Janeiro (where he served as head of department), the Pontifical Catholic University of Rio de Janeiro, the Universidade Santa Úrsula, the Federal University of Rio de Janeiro, and the Universidade Gama Filho. He was a member of the permanent administrative body of the Escola Superior de Guerra.

He was the fifth occupant of Chair 2 of the Brazilian Academy of Letters, to which he was elected on 20 March 1997, in succession to Mário Palmério. He was received on 13 June 1997 by academic Arnaldo Niskier. He in turn received the academics Ana Maria Machado, Luiz Paulo Horta and Marco Lucchesi. He chaired the Brazilian Academy of Letters in 2000 and 2001.

Padilha died from COVID-19 in Rio de Janeiro on 9 September 2021, during the COVID-19 pandemic in Brazil.
