= Bernardo Élis =

In 1975

Bernardo Élis (1915–1997) was a Brazilian novelist and professor. He was born in the state of Goiás to a literary family; his father was the symbolist poet Erico Curado. Élis is primarily remembered today as an author of short fiction. His novel O Tronco won the Premio Jabuti in 1967, and was adapted into an award-winning film by João Batista de Andrade.

In 1975, Elis was elected to the Brazilian Academy of Letters. He taught geography at the Federal University of Goiás and literature at the Pontifical Catholic University of Goiás.
