= Ivan Monteiro de Barros Lins =

Brazilian writer (1904–1975)

Ivan Monteiro de Barros Lins (1904-1975) was a Brazilian writer and intellectual. He was born in Belo Horizonte, the son of Edmundo Pereira Lins and Maria Leonor Monteiro de Barros Lins. He studied at Colégio Anglo-Americano and Colégio Arnaldo in Belo Horizonte, before moving to Rio de Janeiro in 1917, where he studied medicine. He was a major promoter of positivist philosophy in Brazil, and frequently wrote and lectured on the subject.

He published more than a dozen books in his writing career. He taught philosophy at the Universidade do Brasil, and in 1958, he was elected to the Academia Brasileira de Letras, the supreme cultural body in Brazil.
