= Domício Proença Filho =

Brazilian academic and president

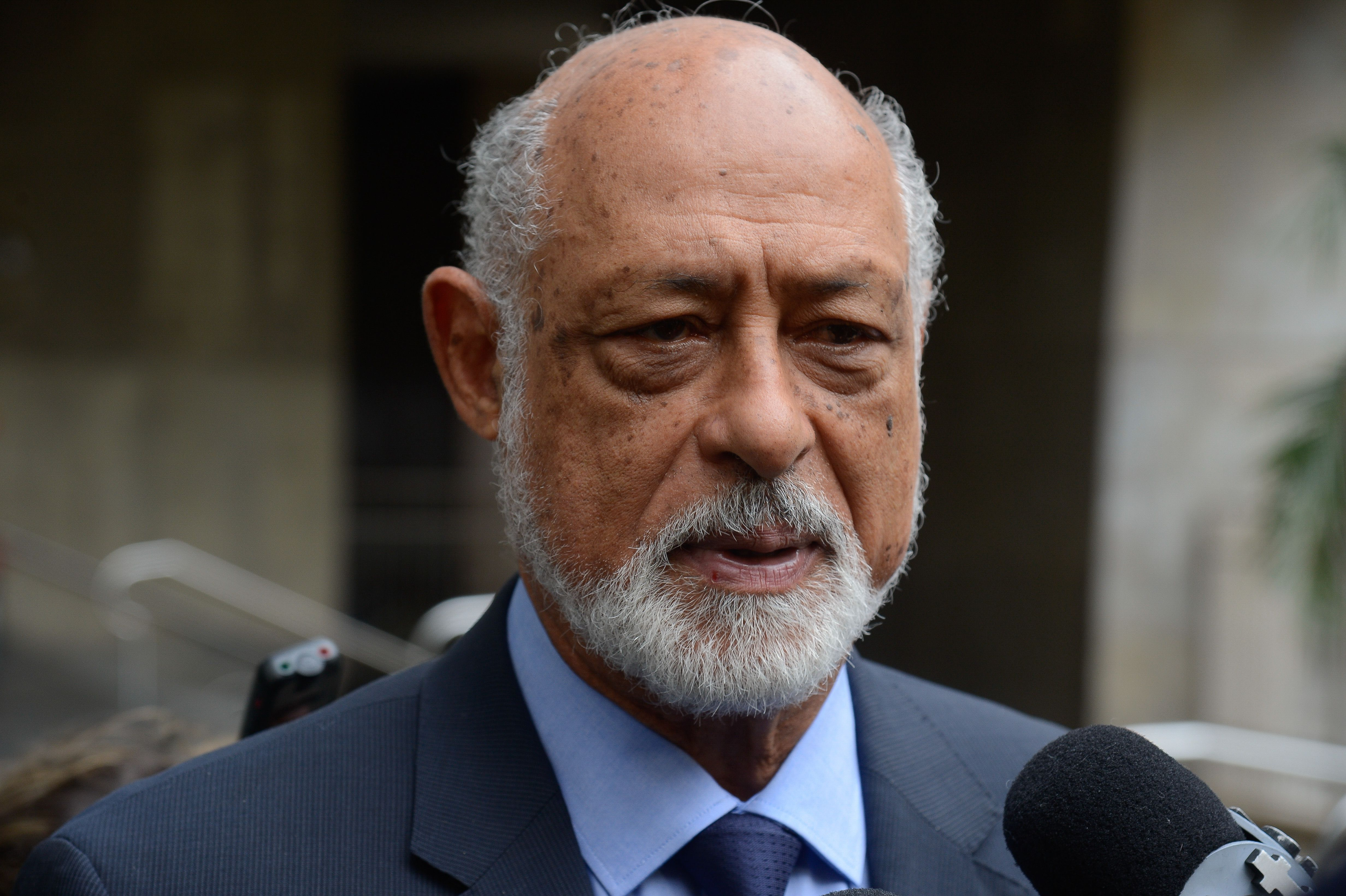
The president of the Brazilian Academy of Letters (ABL), Domício Proença Filho

Domício Proença Filho is a Brazilian academic and former president of the Brazilian Academy of Letters. He was born in Rio de Janeiro, on January 25, 1936, to Maria de Lourdes Proença and Domício Proença. He attended primary school at Escola Joaquim Manuel de Macedo, on Paquetá Island, where he lived during his childhood and adolescence. He then attended junior high school at Colégio Pedro II, a boarding school. He obtained his bachelor's degree from the Faculty of Philosophy of the University of Brazil (1957), with a specialization course in Spanish Language and Literature (1958). He holds a PhD in Literature. He has taught at numerous institutions at home and abroad, among them the Federal University of Rio de Janeiro and the Universidade Federal Fluminense. He taught at the latter for more than three decades and became an Emeritus Professor in 2002.

He is the fifth occupant of Chair 28 of the Brazilian Academy of Letters, to which he was elected on March 23, 2006 succeeding Oscar Dias Corrêa. He was received on July 28, 2006 by Academic Evanildo Bechara. He was also elected President of ABL for the 2016 financial year.
