= Alberto Venancio Filho =

Brazilian lawyer

Alberto Venancio Filho is a Brazilian lawyer. He was born on January 23, 1934, in the city of Rio de Janeiro. He is the sixth occupant of Chair nº 25 at the Brazilian Academy of Letters, to which he was elected on July 25, 1991, in succession to Afonso Arinos de Melo Franco. He was received on April 14, 1992, by the academic Américo Jacobina Lacombe. The academics received Father Fernando Bastos de Ávila and Celso Lafer.
