= Miguel Couto =

Brazilian politician and educationalist

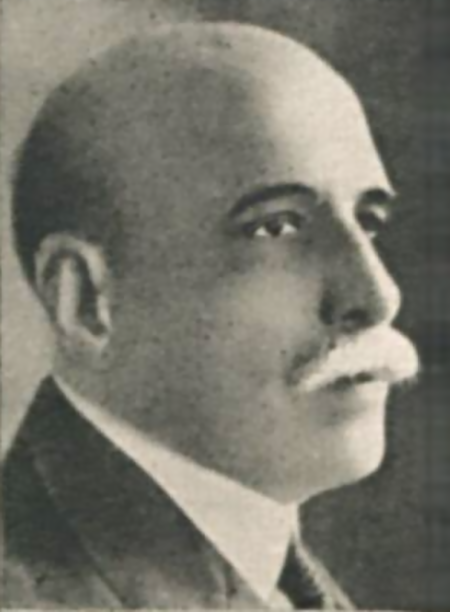
Miguel Couto

Miguel Couto (1 May 1864 – 6 June 1934) was a Brazilian educationist, politician and a member of the Brazilian Academy of Letters. He was one of Brazil's most prominent exponents of eugenics.
