= Rocha Pombo =

Brazilian journalist, professor, poet and historian

José Francisco da Rocha Pombo (1857–1933) was a Brazilian journalist, professor, poet, lawyer and historian. He was born in Morretes, the son of Manuel Francisco Pombo and Angélica da Rocha. He studied law at UFRJ and began his career in journalism. An ardent abolitionist and republican, he founded the journal O Povo, in whose pages he ran campaigns for both causes.

He was elected provincial deputy for the Liberal Party in 1886. He moved to the Federal Capital in 1897, continuing to work as a journalist and teaching at the Colégio Pedro II and Escola Normal. In 1912, he tried to create a university in Paraná, but without success.

He published numerous books, including poetry collections and works of history; the latter included a noted history of Brazil. In 1900, he was admitted as a member of the Brazilian Historical and Geographical Institute.

He was the third occupant of Chair 39 of the Brazilian Academy of Letters. Although elected in March 1933, in succession to Alberto de Faria, Pombo was very sick and did not take office. He died three months later.
