= Francisco do Monte Alverne =

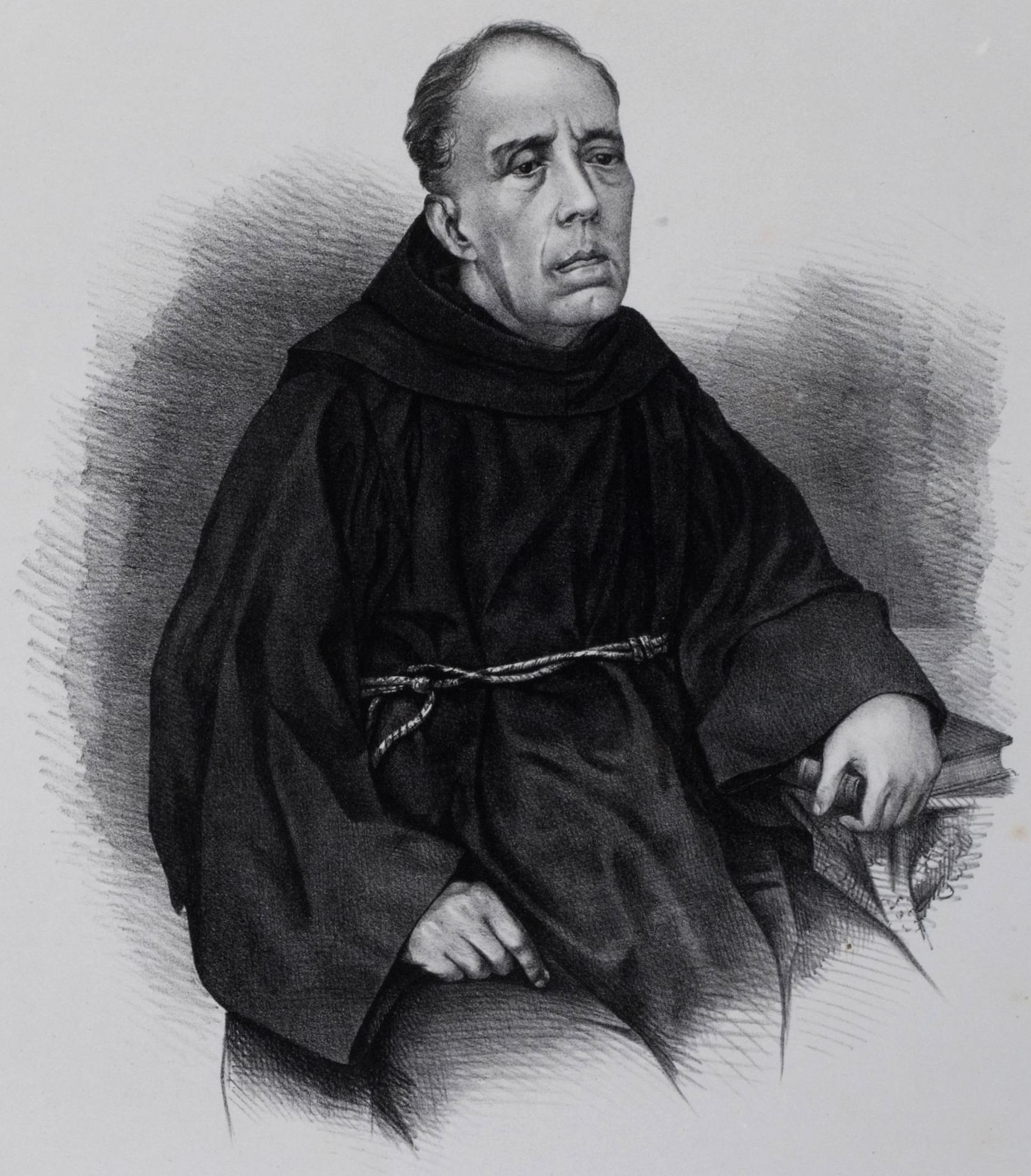
- A gravure depicting Monte Alverne
- Born: Francisco José de Carvalho; 9 August 1784; Rio de Janeiro, Captaincy of Rio de Janeiro, State of Brazil
- Died: 2 December 1858 (aged 74); Niterói, Province of Rio de Janeiro, Empire of Brazil
- Occupations: Preacher, priest, theologist

Francisco do Monte Alverne (9 August 1784 – 2 December 1858) was a Brazilian Franciscan friar, and the official preacher of the Empire of Brazil.

He is the correspondent patron of the 14th chair of the Brazilian Academy of Letters.

== Life ==
Monte Alverne was born Francisco José de Carvalho in 1784, to João Antônio da Silva and Ana Francisca da Conceição. In 1802, he entered a Franciscan monastery, where he studied alongside 11 Brazilians and 11 Portuguese people. In 1808, he became a presbyter, and was given the surname Monte Alverne, in a reference to the mount La Verna, where Saint Francis of Assisi received the stigmatas.

Later he became an itinerant preacher and Philosophy teacher. Moving to Rio de Janeiro in 1816, he was proclaimed the royal preacher. He performed the funeral oration of Empress Consort Maria Leopoldina in 1826.

From 1836, Monte Alverne started to show signs of blindness. He moved to a friend's house in Niterói, where he died in 1858.

The Brazilian poet Gonçalves de Magalhães, famous for introducing Romanticism in the Brazilian literature, considers Monte Alverne a forerunner of this movement.

== Works ==
- Obras Oratórias (1833 – in 4 volumes)
- Compêndio de Filosofia (1859 – posthumous), in which he defends the Eclecticism and the ideals of John Locke and Étienne Bonnot de Condillac, and fights against the Thomism and the Scholasticism.

Preceded by New creation	Brazilian Academy of Letters – Correspondent patron of the 14th chair	Succeeded by Herbert Spencer (founder)
