= Godofredo de Oliveira Neto =

Godofredo de Oliveira Neto (born 1951) is a Brazilian writer. He was born in Blumenau, Santa Catarina in the south of Brazil. He studied at UFRJ (Federal University of Rio de Janeiro) and the Sorbonne, and he has taught literature at UFRJ for many years.

He has written more than a dozen books, among them the novel Menino Oculto (2005), which was a finalist for the Jabuti Prize. Other works include the Catarinense Trilogy, consisting of the novels O Bruxo do Contestado, Amores exilados and Marcelino.

Since 2022, he has occupied Seat 35 of the Academia Brasileira de Letras.
