= Inglês de Sousa =

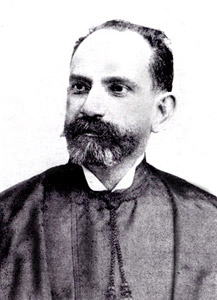
- Born: December 28, 1853; Óbidos, Pará, Brazil
- Died: September 6, 1918 (aged 64); Rio de Janeiro, Brazil
- Citizenship: Brazilian
- Education: Federal University of Pernambuco Recife School of Law
- Occupations: Lawyer, writer, journalist
- Notable work: O Coronel Sangrado (1877)
- Style: Naturalism (literature)

Inglês de Sousa (born Herculano Marcos Inglês de Sousa) was a Brazilian lawyer, professor, journalist, and novelist. He was born in Óbidos, PA, on December 28, 1853, and died in Rio de Janeiro, RJ, on September 6, 1918. He was one of the founding members of the Academia Brasileira de Letras, and was the first occupant of Chair nº 28, which had as its patron Manuel Antônio de Almeida. He also served as treasurer of the new Academia. He was succeeded to his chair by Xavier Marques.
