= Luís Murat =

Brazilian writer (1861–1929)

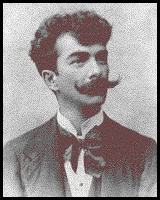
Luís Murat

Luís Morton Barreto Murat (1861–1929) was a Brazilian journalist, poet, philosopher and politician. He was born in Itaguaí on 4 May 1861 and died in Rio de Janeiro on 3 July 1929. He was a founding member of the Academia Brasileira and was the first occupant of Chair 1. He was succeeded in the position by Afonso d'E. Taunay.
