= Maurício Campos de Medeiros =

Brazilian doctor and politician (1885 - 1966)

Maurício Campos de Medeiros

Maurício de Medeiros (1885–1966) was a Brazilian doctor, teacher, writer and politician.

== Biography ==
He was born in Rio de Janeiro in July 1885, the son of José Joaquim de Campos da Costa de Medeiros and Maria Carolina Ribeiro de Medeiros. One of his brothers, Medeiros e Albuquerque, was a prominent literary figure, and occupied, in the 1920s, the presidency of the Brazilian Academy of Letters.

Maurício de Medeiros studied at Colégio Pedro II and at the Faculty of Medicine in Rio de Janeiro, where he would later become a professor. He took specialized courses in medicine in France in 1906 and 1907. On his return to Brazil, he began to write for some periodicals in Rio de Janeiro and São Paulo, including Gazeta de Notícias and Correio Paulistano in the years 1908 and 1909.

He resumed his journalistic activity in 1920, and in the following years contributed to A Gazeta in São Paulo and A Noite, Correio da Manhã and Diário Carioca in Rio de Janeiro.

Involving himself in politics, he was elected state deputy in the state of Rio de Janeiro in 1916, and federal deputy in 1921. He was elected again to the Chamber of Deputies in 1927 and 1930. In 1950 he was appointed head of the Brazilian delegation to the First World Congress of Psychiatry. He also participated in the Neuropathology congresses held in Rome and London, in 1952 and 1955, respectively. He held the position of Minister of Health in the governments of Nereu Ramos and Juscelino Kubitschek de Oliveira.

He was the fourth occupant of Chair 38 in the Brazilian Academy of Letters. He was elected on April 28, 1955, succeeding Academician Celso Vieira and received by Academician Clementino Fraga on August 9, 1955.

== Global policy ==
He was one of the signatories of the agreement to convene a convention for drafting a world constitution. As a result, for the first time in human history, a World Constituent Assembly convened to draft and adopt the Constitution for the Federation of Earth.

== Death ==
Maurício died in Rio on June 23, 1966.
