= Viana Moog =

- Moog in 1979
- Born: 28 October 1906 São Leopoldo, Rio Grande do Sul, Brazil
- Died: 15 January 1988 (aged 81) Rio de Janeiro, Rio de Janeiro, Brazil
- Occupation: Writer; journalist; lawyer
- Notable works: O Ciclo do Ouro Negro (1936)
- Spouse: Frigga Moog

Clodomir Viana Moog (28 October 1906 – 15 January 1988) was a Brazilian lawyer, journalist, novelist and essayist.

== Biography ==
Moog was born in São Leopoldo, Rio Grande do Sul, the son of Marcos Moog and Maria da Glória Viana. Failing to join the military, he studied law in Porto Alegre. He also served as an anti-smuggling border agent. He later served as a tax agent in Santa Cruz do Sul and in Rio Grande.

Upon graduation, he became involved in politics, joining the Liberal Alliance. He was an active participant in the Constitutionalist Revolution against dictator Getúlio Vargas. He was arrested and removed to Amazonas, but later received amnesty and returned to Rio Grande do Sul.

He served as a representative of the Brazilian government at the Organization of American States (OAS) and at the United Nations. In 1945, he became a member of the Brazilian Academy of Letters. As a writer, he published extensively in both fiction and non-fiction, and his complete works in 10 volumes came out in 1966.

He died in 1988 in Rio de Janeiro.
