= Pedro Lessa =

19th and 20th centuries Brazilian lawyer and magistrate

- Pedro Augusto Carneiro Lessa
- Born: 25 September 1859; Serro, Minas Gerais, Brazil
- Died: 25 July 1921 (aged 61); Rio de Janeiro, Rio de Janeiro, Brazil
- Education: University of São Paulo
- Occupations: Lawyer, writer, and magistrate
- Known for: First black justice of Brazilian Supreme Federal Court and pioneering writer in the philosophy of history in Brazil.
- Notable work: About Judicial Branch, Studies about Philosophy of Law

Pedro Augusto Carneiro Lessa (Serro, 25 September 1859 – 25 July 1921) was a Brazilian professor of Constitutional Law and Philosophy of Law. He published important books in Portuguese language about Philosophy of Law, and he lectured at the University of São Paulo School of Law.

Pedro Lessa was mulatto. So he was the first black justice of Brazilian Supremo Tribunal Federal. Even after his appointment as a Supreme Court Justice, he suffered racism from his own colleagues, as occurred in a disagreement with fellow Justice Epitácio Pessoa during trials in that court, who even threatened to write an article calling him "pardavasco" (a derogatory term implying someone of mixed race).

Lessa was also a strong defender of the constitutional prerogatives of the Judiciary Branch in Brazil, even favoring judicial activism in the protection of fundamental rights. It was in this context that he created the Brazilian theory of habeas corpus, which led to the incorporation into Brazilian law of the procedural action known as writ of mandamus (In Portuguese "Mandado de segurança").

Member of Brazilian Academy of Letters since 1910, he was also an intellectual who wrote philosophical essays such as "Is History a Science?", a text published in 1900 that is believed to be the first work written and published in Brazil on the Philosophy of History.

He wrote several books, articles and essays published in specialized reviews. Lessa contributes to spread the legal positivism on Brazilian Law. He died in Rio de Janeiro.

== Bibliography (Original Title in Italic) ==
=== Books ===
- (1887) Commercial law: Can the wives of people who are prohibited from engaging in commerce, by virtue of Article 2 of the Commercial Code, engage in commerce? Can those prohibited from engaging in commerce authorize their wives to engage in commerce? (Direito commercial: as mulheres das pessoas que são prohibidas de commerciar, por força do art. 2º do Codigo Commercial, podem comerciar? Os prohibidos de commerciar podem autorisar suas mulheres ao exercicio do commercio?)
- (1902) Legal issue: interpretation of article 36 of the bankruptcy decree: functions of the trustees (Questão forense: interpretação do artigo 36 do decreto das quebras: funcções dos syndicos)
- (1905) Psychological determinism and criminal imputability and responsibility (O determinismo psychico e a imputabilidade e responsabilidade criminaes)
- (1909) State intervention in matters of public hygiene: report (Intervenção do Estado em materia de hygiene publica: relatorio)
- (1909) Dissertations and controversies – Legal Studies (Dissertações e polêmicas – Estudos jurídicos)
- (1912) Studies about Philosophy of Law (Estudos de philosophia do direito)
- (1915) About Judicial Branch (Do Poder Judiciário)

=== Articles and Essays ===
- (1895) What is socialism? (Que é o socialismo?)
- (1896) Procedural law: from the enforcement process to the collection of medical fees (Direito processual: do processo executivo para a cobrança de honorarios medicos)
- (1900) Is History a Science? (A História é uma Ciência?)
- (1908) History before and after Buckel: reflections on the concept of History (A História antes e depois de Buckel: reflexões sobre o conceito de História)
- (1908) Regarding the State's Competence to Legislate on Local Court Proceedings (Da Competencia do estado para legislar sobre o processo das justiças locaes)

Legal offices
Preceded by Lúcio de Mendonça	Justice of the Supreme Federal Court; 1907–21	Succeeded by Alfredo Pinto
