= Arnaldo Niskier =

Brazilian academic

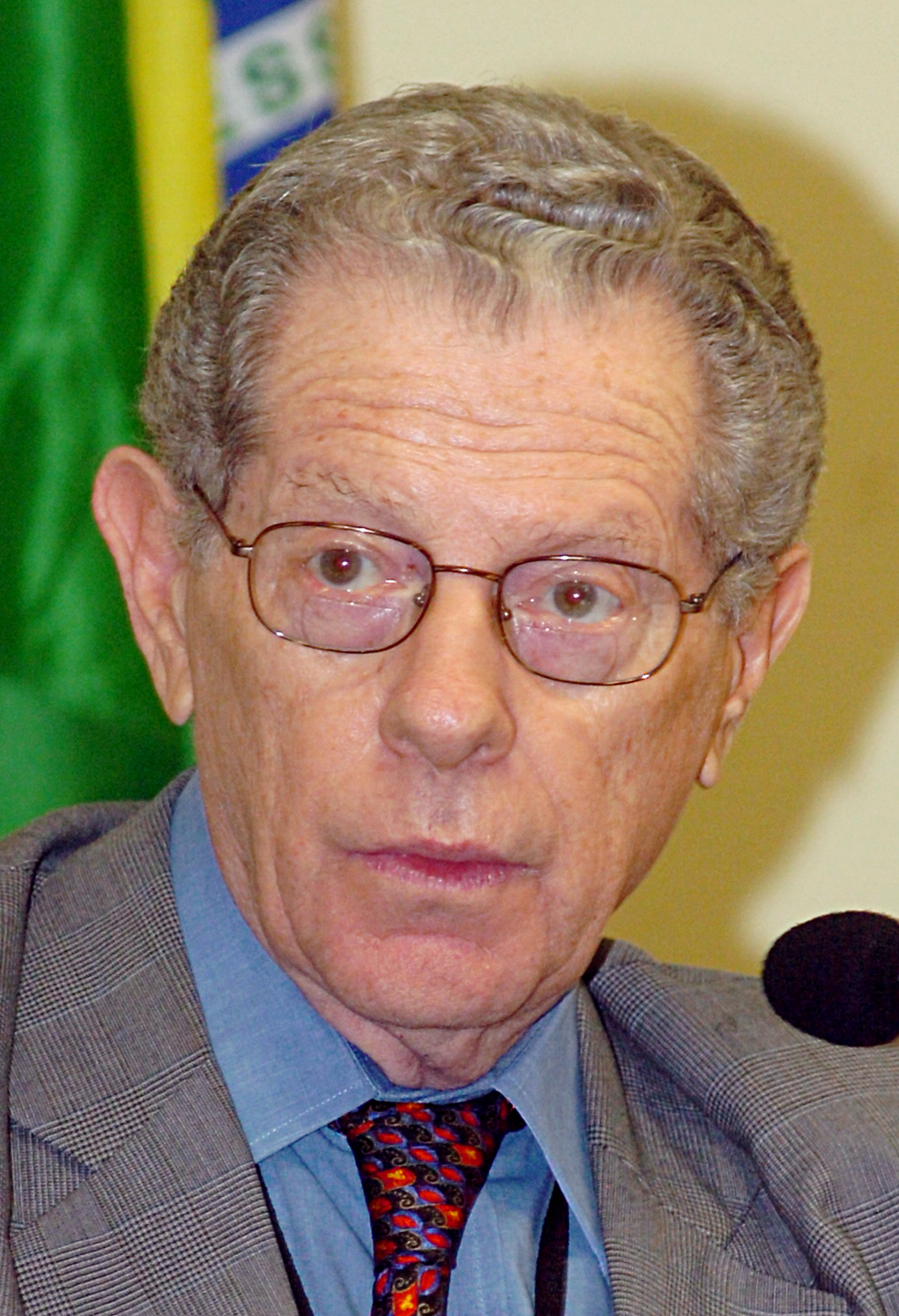
Arnaldo Portrait

Arnaldo Niskier is a Brazilian writer, academic, and historian. He was born in Rio de Janeiro in April 1935. He is the seventh occupant of Chair nº 18 at the Academia Brasileira, to which he was elected on March 22, 1984, succeeding Peregrino Júnior. He was received on September 17, 1984 by academic Rachel de Queiroz. In turn, he received academics Murilo Melo Filho, Carlos Heitor Cony and Paulo Coelho. He chaired the Brazilian Academy of Letters in 1998 and 1999.
