= Geraldo Holanda Cavalcanti =

Brazilian lawyer and diplomat

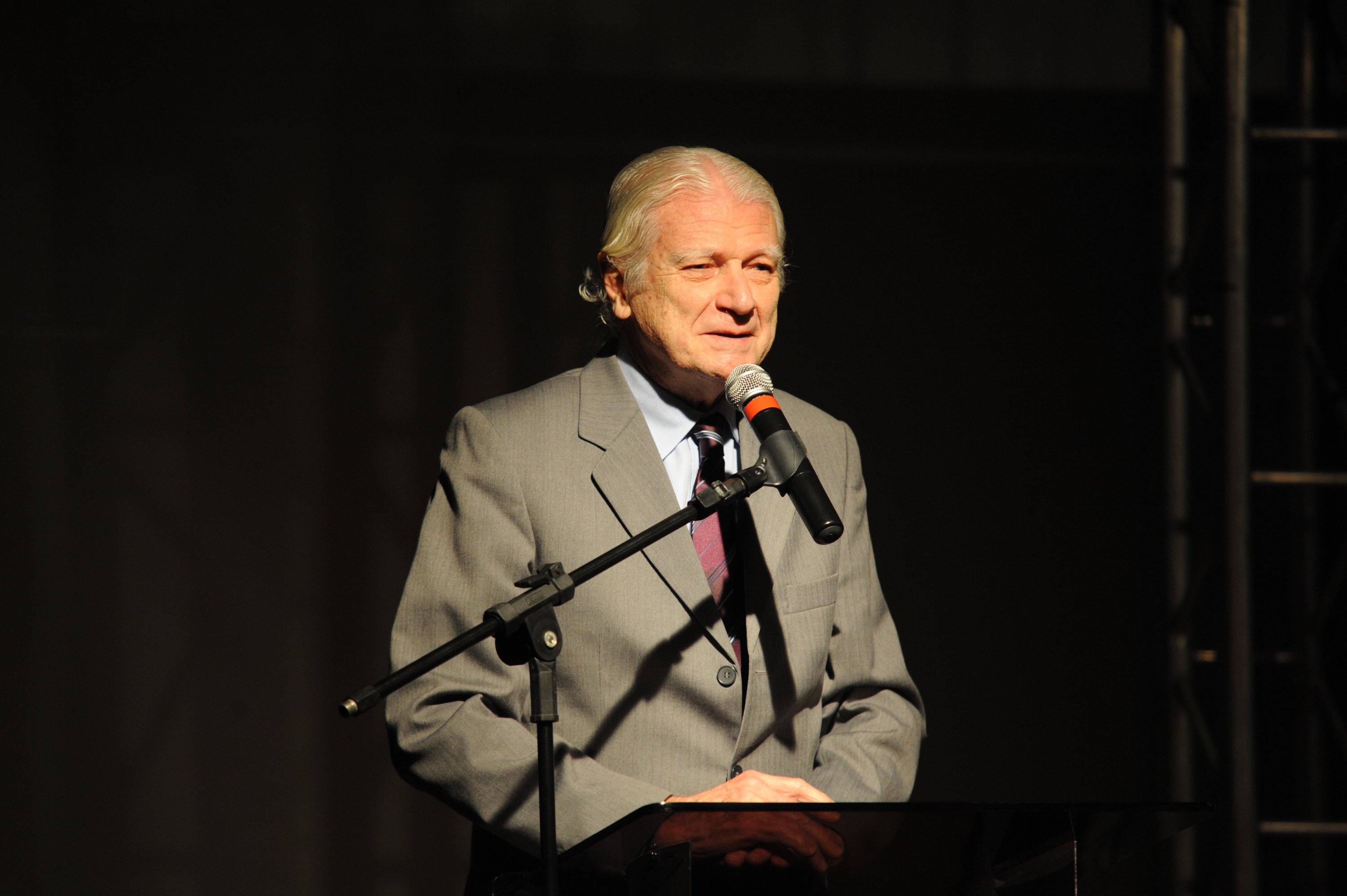
Geraldo Holanda Cavalcanti

Geraldo Holanda Cavalcanti is a Brazilian lawyer and diplomat. He was born in Recife, on February 6, 1929.

He is the sixth occupant of Chair No. 29 at the Academia Brasileira.
