= Filinto de Almeida =

Brazilian writer

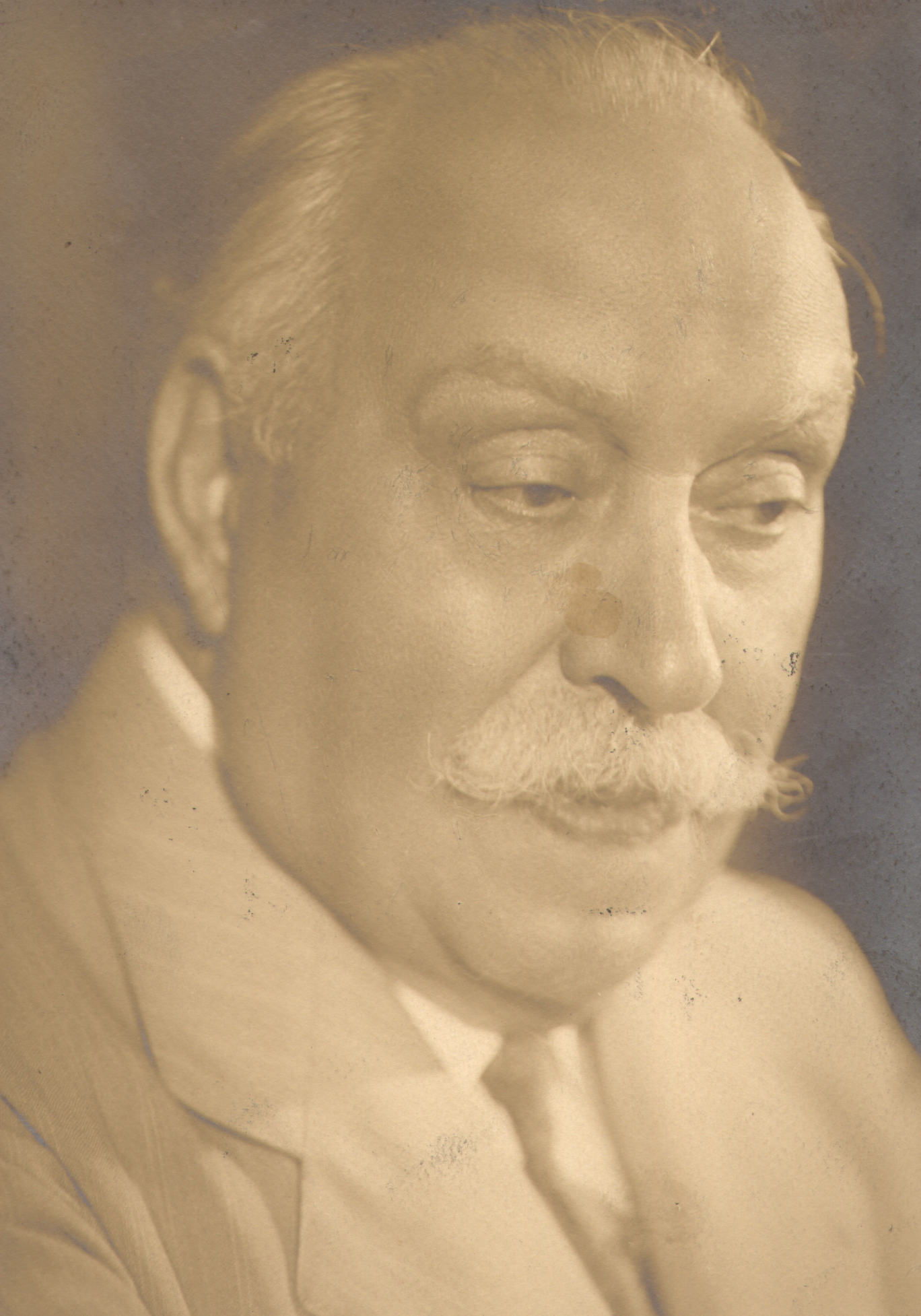
- Almeida in 1945
- Born: December 4, 1857; Porto, Kingdom of Portugal
- Died: January 28, 1945 (aged 87); Rio de Janeiro, Brazil
- Occupations: Writer; poet
- Spouse: Júlia Lopes de Almeida
- Writing career
- Notable work: Harmonias da Noite Velha (1946)

Francisco Filinto de Almeida (December 4, 1857 – January 28, 1945) was a Portuguese-born Brazilian dramatist, journalist, and poet.

== Biography ==
Almeida was born in Porto, Portugal, but was taken to Brazil by relatives at the age of 10 where he lived the rest of his life, dying in Rio de Janeiro. He did not have a formal education, but began his career as a writer at the age of 19. In 1887, he married Júlia Lopes de Almeida, a novelist, in Lisbon. After the establishment of the First Brazilian Republic, he officially took Brazilian citizenship and became a politician. He was the editor of various journals. He wrote drama, poetry, and novels.

== Lyrica ==
A writer who experimented with various poetic genres, he published his first book of poetry in 1887, Lyrica (Lírica), which is notable for the creation of a new verse form, the biolet. The biolet has stimulated at least limited imitation in English.

== Other works ==
- Um idioma (entreato cômico – 1876)
- Os mosquitos (monólogo em verso – 1887)
- O Defunto (comédia teatral em um ato – 1894)
- O Gran Galeoto (drama em verso, traduzido em colaboração com Valentim Magalhães – 1896)
- O beijo (comédia em 1 ato, em verso – 1907)
- Cantos e cantigas (poesia – 1915)
- Camoniana (sonetos – 1945)
- Colunas da noite (crônicas – 1945)
- Harmonias da noite velha (sonetos – 1946)
- A casa verde (romance em colaboração com Júlia Lopes de Almeida, publicado em folhetins do Jornal do Commercio de 18 de dezembro de 1898 a 16 de março de 1899)
