= José da Silva Lisboa, Viscount of Cairu =

Viscount of Cairu
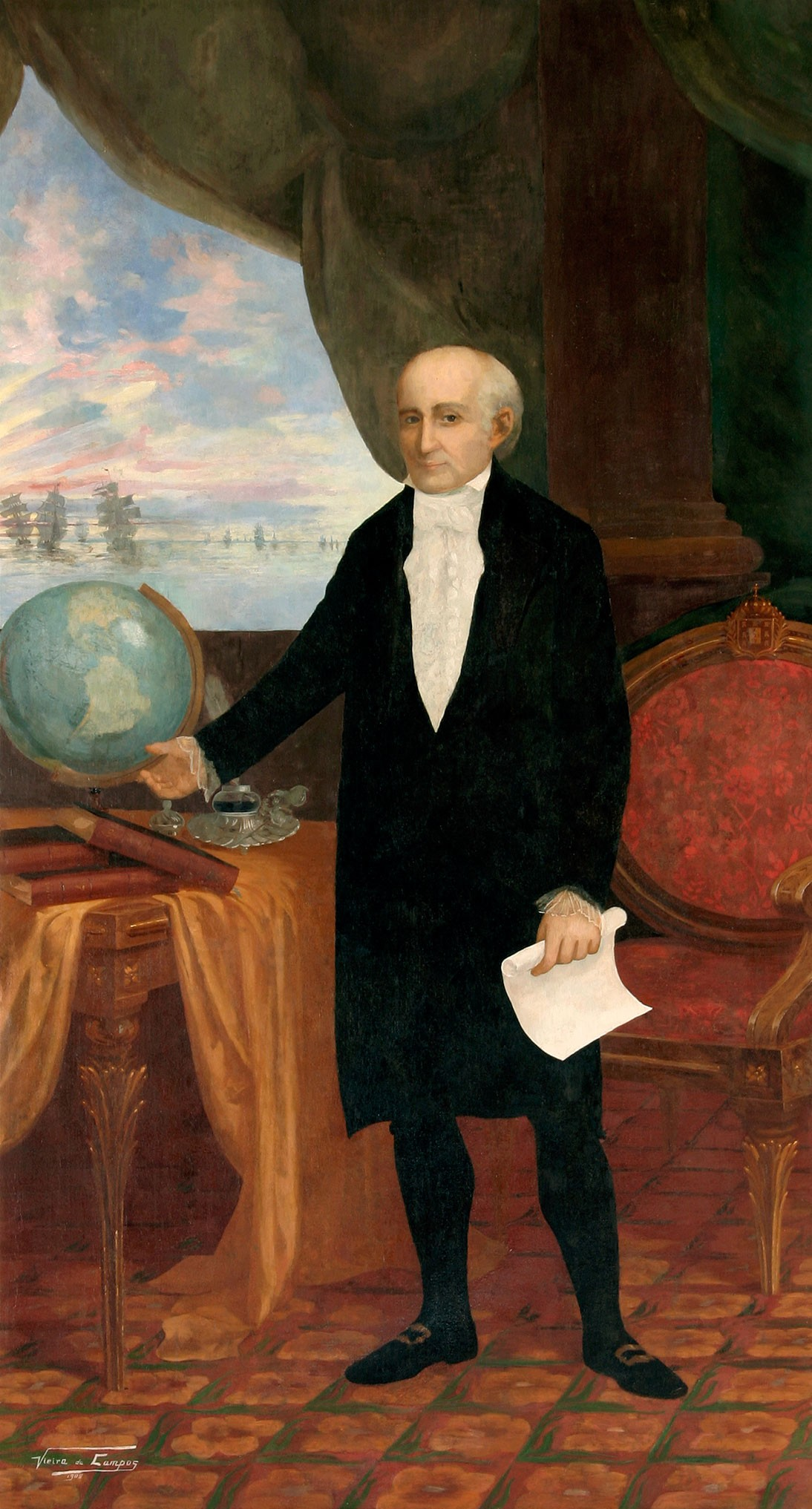
- Born: July 16, 1756; Salvador, Colonial Brazil, Portuguese Empire
- Died: August 20, 1835 (79 years old); Rio de Janeiro, Empire of Brazil
- Occupations: Economist, jurist, and politician

José da Silva Lisboa, first Baron and Viscount of Cairu (16 July 1756 – 20 August 1835), was a Brazilian economist, historian, jurist, publicist and politician, active at the time of the Independence of Brazil and credited for the promotion of important economic reforms. He held various positions in the economic and political administration of Brazil after the transfer or the Portuguese Court in 1808, including Deputy of the Royal Chamber of Commerce (Junta do Comércio) and Judge of the House of Supplication (Casa da Suplicação - a court of appeal).

Lisboa played an important role in encouraging the teaching of political economy in the country, and participated actively in the drafting of the decrees that determined the opening of Brazilian ports (ending the Exclusive Metropolitan Trade which had restricted Brazil to only trade with Portugal) and the end of the prohibition of manufactures in Brazil.

== Studies ==
Son of a Portuguese architect, Henrique da Silva Lisboa, and Helena Nunes de Jesus, José studied in Bahia from the age of eight, especially philosophy, music and piano. He completed his studies at the University of Coimbra, where he attended legal and philosophical courses from 1774, graduating in 1778. Bachelor in canons by the University of Coimbra, he was appointed professor of national and moral philosophy in the city of Salvador, Bahia, a chair which he held for 19 years, besides having created the chair of Greek language in the city.

== Public career ==
In 1797 he returned to Portugal, obtaining his retirement and the appointment to the office of deputy and secretary of the Inspection Bureau of Sugar and Tobacco (Mesa da Inspeção da Bahia), where he took office in 1798 and stayed until 1808.

In 1801 he published his first book, Principles of Mercantile Law and Laws of the Navy for the use of the Portuguese youth, which includes maritime insurance, maritime exchange, damages, bills of exchange, merchant contracts, courts and causes of trade (or Princípios do Direito Mercantil e Leis da Marinha para uso da mocidade portuguesa, que compreende o seguro marítimo, o câmbio marítimo, as avarias, as letras de câmbio, os contratos mercantes, os tribunais e as causas de comércio). In 1804 he published his main work, the Principles of Political Economy (Princípios de Economia Política), the first Portuguese-written book inspired by Adam Smith's work. Lisboa was a proponent for free trade. He argued that Smith's The Wealth of Nations "established the chief principles which statesmen should follow... who desire to promote the prosperity of their country."

When Prince regent John arrived in Bahia in 1808, Lisboa drew up a representation of merchants from Salvador, in which they requested the opening of the Brazilian ports to the friendly nations of Portugal, which resulted in the Royal Charter of 24 January 1808. John ordered Lisboa to accompany him to Rio de Janeiro, where he arrived on March 7, and in the following month he was appointed judge of the Supreme Court (Desembargo do Paço).

In August 1808 he was appointed deputy of the Royal Chamber of Commerce, Agriculture, Factories and Navigation of the State of Brazil; in 1809 he was charged with organizing a code of commerce; and in 1815 he was in charge of the examination of the works for printing.

Lisboa tried to reconcile Portugal and Brazil and prevent the separation between both states, and for this he founded the newspaper O Conciliador do Reino Unido, in which he defended the rights of the Prince and pondered the advantages of the pluricontinental monarchy. When the hope for conciliation disappeared, and in order not to lose the support of the crown, Lisboa did not hesitate to fight for the independence movement led by the prince regent Pedro I.

A defender of the centralization of the power, Lisboa condemned the revolutionaries of the Confederation of the Equator in his press works and antagonized the journal Typhis Pernambucano of Frei Caneca, one of the leaders of the Confederation. After independence, he continued to hold high positions, receiving honorary distinctions. In 1825 he was awarded the title of Baron and later in 1826 the title of Viscount of Cairu, and was later chosen as senator of the Brazilian Empire. Also in 1825, Lisboa was elected a member of the American Philosophical Society in Philadelphia.

In 1832, he began to advocate for the creation of a university in Rio de Janeiro, a fact only concretized almost a hundred years later, with the foundation of the Federal University of Rio de Janeiro in 1920.
