= Josué Montello =

Brazilian writer and diplomat (1917–2006)

Josué de Sousa Montello (August 21, 1917 – March 15, 2006) was a Brazilian novelist, playwright, essayist, diplomat, and professor. He presided over the Brazilian Academy of Letters.
