= Adelmar Tavares =

Brazilian lawyer, professor, and poet

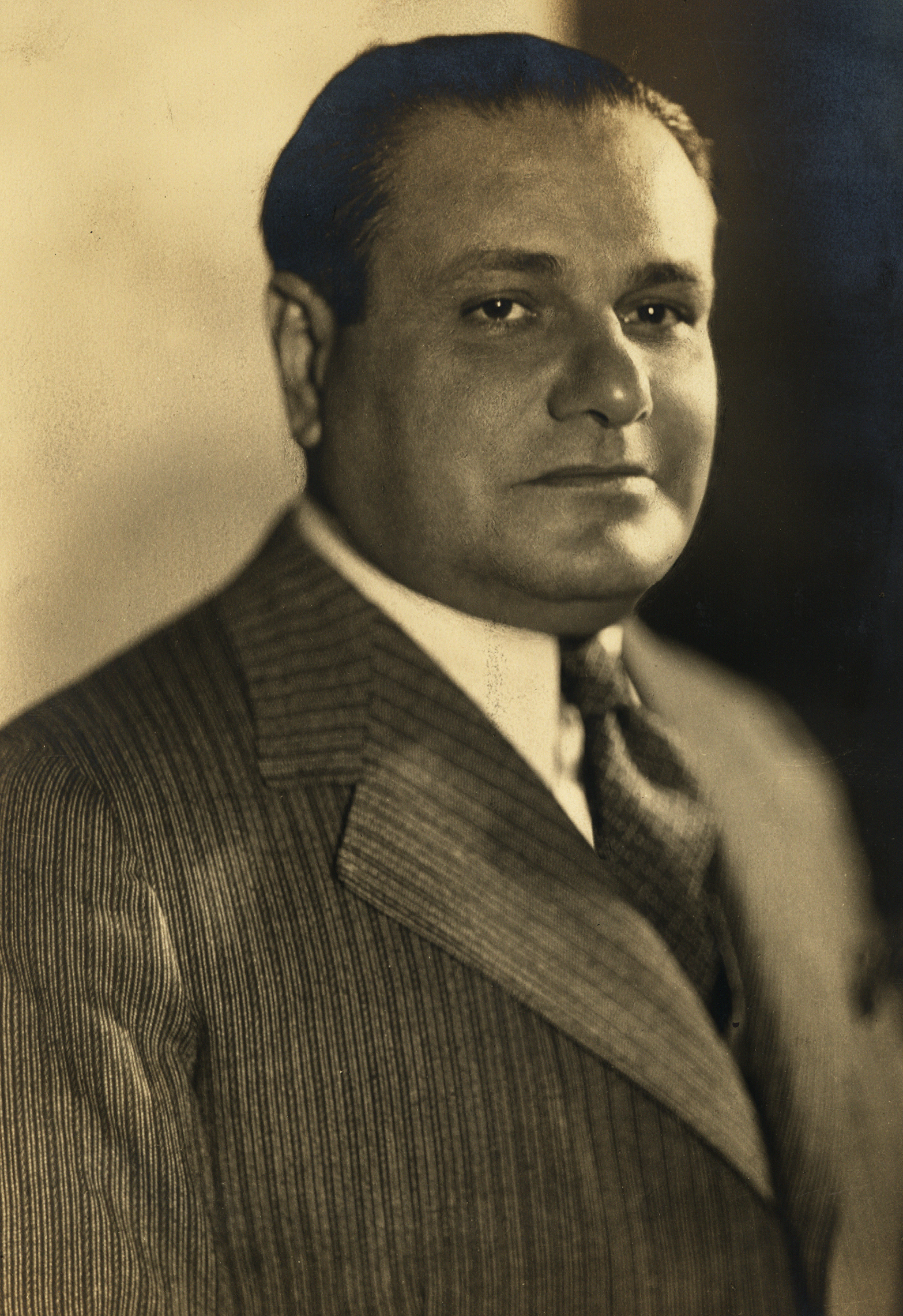
- Adelmar Tavares in 1934.

President of the Brazilian Academy of Letters
- In office 1948

Personal details
- Born: Adelmar Tavares da Silva; February 16, 1888 Recife, Brazil
- Died: June 20, 1963 (aged 75) Rio de Janeiro, Brazil

Adelmar Tavares da Silva (Recife, February 16, 1888 – June 20, 1963 Rio de Janeiro) was a lawyer, magistrate, jurist, professor and poet from Recife. He was a member of Brazilian societies devoted to criminology and law. As a poet he was respected with several of his poems becoming songs. In 1948 he became President of the Academia Brasileira de Letras.

== Partial bibliography ==
- Luz dos meus olhos, Myriam - poetry (1912)
- A poesia das violas - poetry (1921)
- Noite cheia de estrelas - poetry (1925)
- A linda mentira - prose (1926)
- O caminho enluarado - poetry (1932)
- A luz do altar - poetry (1934)

Preceded by João Luís Alves	Brazilian Academy of Letters - Occupant of the 11th chair 1926 — 1963	Succeeded by Deolindo Couto

Preceded by João Neves da Fontoura	President of the Brazilian Academy of Letters; 1948	Succeeded by Miguel Osório de Almeida
