= Ivan Junqueira =

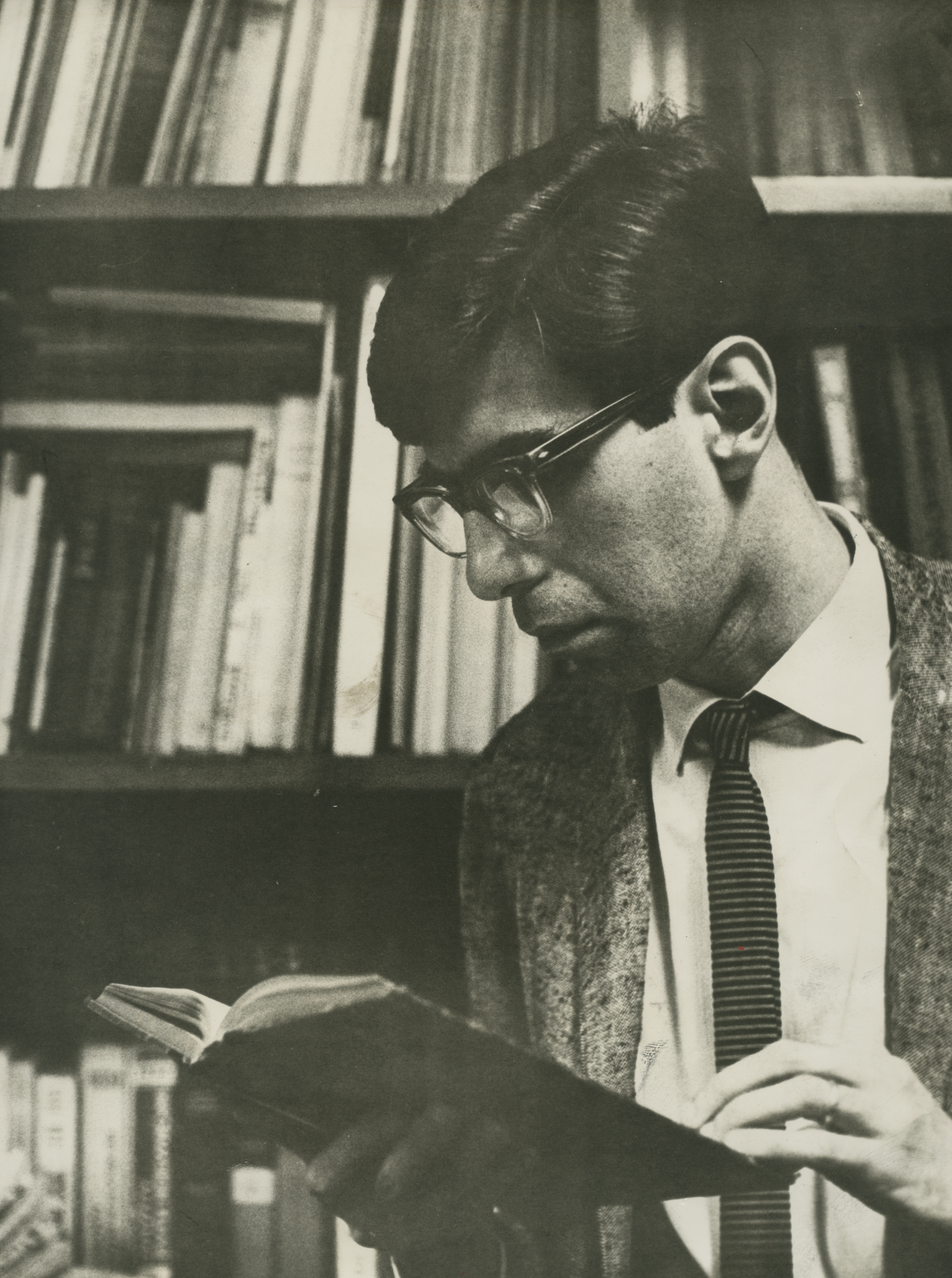
Ivan Junqueira

Ivan Junqueira was a Brazilian poet, essayist, literary critic, and translator. He was a four-time winner of the Jabuti Prize:

- in 1995, for the book of poems A consecração dos osso
- in 2005, for his translation of the complete poetry of TS Eliot, published in a bilingual edition
- in 2008, for the book of poems O outro lado in 2008
- in 2010, for the essay Cinzas do espólio

He also received the National Poetry Prize for A rainha arcaica and the Premio Assis Chateaubriand Prize for the book of essays À sombra de Orfeu.

Junqueira occupied chair number 37 of the Brazilian Academy of Letters. He died in 2014 at the age of 79.
