= Carlos de Laet =

Brazilian journalist (1847–1927)

- Born: October 3, 1847; Rio de Janeiro, Empire of Brazil
- Died: December 7, 1927 (aged 80); Rio de Janeiro, Brazil

Carlos Maximiliano Pimenta de Laet (October 3, 1847 – December 7, 1927) was a journalist, professor and poet from Brazil.

| Preceded by Manuel de Araújo Porto-Alegre, Baron of Santo Ângelo (patron) | Brazilian Academy of Letters – Occupant of the 32nd chair 1897–1927 | Succeeded by Ramiz Galvão |
| Preceded by Domício da Gama | President of the Brazilian Academy of Letters; 1919-1923 | Succeeded by Afrânio Peixoto |
