= Merval Pereira =

Brazilian journalist

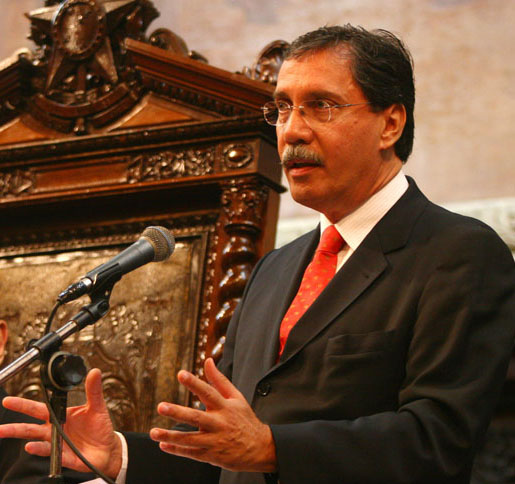
- Merval Pereira in 2010
- Born: October 24, 1949 (age 76); Rio de Janeiro
- Occupation: Journalist
- Known for: O Globo

Merval Pereira is a Brazilian journalist, political columnist and commentator for O Globo, CBN News and GloboNews cable television.

== Career ==
Pereira joined O Globo in 1968 as a cub reporter, and has served as its editor-in-chief. From 1983 to 1985, Pereira worked for Veja, a Brazilian newsweekly.

He has served as Media Leader at the World Economic Forum in Davos, Switzerland, where he has been a mediator for round tables on Brazil and Latin America. In 2008, he was a visiting scholar at the Center for Brazilian Studies at the Institute of Latin American Studies at Columbia University. In November 2008, Pereira gave a talk at the ILAS on “Brazilian Perspectives on the U.S. Elections: What Is at Stake?”

He became a member of the Brazilian Academy of Philosophy in 2010 and was elected a member of the Brazilian Academy of Letters in June 2011.

=== Books ===
- Conto no livro + 21 histórias de Amor (Francisco Alves)
- O Lulismo no Poder (Editora Record), a 2010 collection of articles about the Lula government.
- Pereira's 2013 book Mensalão is a collection of his articles about the August–December 2012 trial of those involved in the 2005 Mensalão corruption scandal. In a review, Reinaldo Azevedo praised Pereira for not being “part of the growing ranks of those who write to please or displease” or “the type who marches out of step only to draw attention.” It also praised him for his ability to strike a balance “between the details and the whole picture....throughout the book, one follows the flow of the story, but without losing the delectable details.”
