= Vicente do Salvador =

Brazilian historian (1564 – c. 1635)

Vicente do Salvador born Vicente Rodrigues Palha, (Salvador, December 20, 1564 – c. 1635) was a Franciscan friar in the Portuguese colony of Brazil, the author of the first history of Brazil, often titled the "father of Brazilian history".

Vicente Rodrigues Palha was born in Matuim, about six miles north of the city of Bahia in 1564. Like most learned men of the time, he studied in the Jesuit College of Salvador, Bahia, and later in the University of Coimbra where he majored.

Returning to Brazil, he was ordained priest, came to be canon at the cathedral and vicar-general of Bahia. At thirty-five he became a Franciscan friar, changing his name to Vicente Salvador. He was a missionary in Paraíba, lived in Pernambuco and cooperated in the founding of the Franciscan house in Rio de Janeiro in 1607, becoming its first prelate. After returning to Pernambuco, where he taught arts at the convent of the order, in Olinda, returning to Bahia in 1612. He was elected in Lisbon custodian of the Franciscan Custody of Brazil. After a stay in Portugal, he returned to Bahia, as guardian, having died there between 1636 and 1639.

== Salvador's History of Brazil ==
Friar Vicente Salvador's "History of Brazil" written in 1627 is considered the "first classic of Brazil". It is divided into five books, describing the modus vivendi in the early Portuguese colony. The book is divided into 48 chapters describing the characteristics of the colony, its climate, fauna, flora, its name, the discovery, settlement and the division of hereditary captaincies, as well as the pressure of French and Dutch privateers in the Brazilian coast. It is also one of the first studies on everyday life in the colony, reporting marriage customs, child rearing, funeral rites, indigenous languages and so on.
