= Elmano Cardim =

Brazilian journalist

Elmano Cardim was a Brazilian journalist. He was born on December 24, 1891, in Valença. He was the fifth occupant of Chair 39 of the Brazilian Academy of Letters, to which he was elected on April 13, 1950, in succession to Rodolfo Garcia. He was received into the Academy by Levi Carneiro on September 29, 1950. He chaired the Brazilian Academy of Letters in 1958.

Cardim died on February 19, 1979. His successor to Chair 39 was Otto Lara Resende.
