= Miguel Osório de Almeida =

Brazilian physician (1890–1952)

Miguel Osório de Almeida (September 1, 1890 – December 2, 1953) was a noted Brazilian physician and scientist, brother of another scientist, Álvaro Osório de Almeida, both considered the fathers of modern physiology in Brazil.

Almeida was born and died in Rio de Janeiro. He studied medicine at the Faculdade de Medicina do Rio de Janeiro which presently is part of the Federal University of Rio de Janeiro. He was the chairman of physiology of the School of Agriculture and Veterinary Medicine of Rio de Janeiro and of the Instituto Oswaldo Cruz, the dean of the Universidade do Rio de Janeiro and member of the Brazilian Academy of Letters.

He was author or co-author of several important studies on neurophysiology. He received the "Einstein Award" by the Brazilian Academy of Sciences and the "Sicard Prize" by the French Academy of Medicine in Paris. He was also one of the inspirers of the foundation of the Brazilian Society of Physiology (1957) and a member of the Brazilian Academy of Sciences.

Preceded by Medeiros e Albuquerque (founder)	Brazilian Academy of Letters - Occupant of the 22nd chair 1935 — 1952	Succeeded by Luís Viana Filho

Preceded by Adelmar Tavares	President of the Brazilian Academy of Letters; 1949	Succeeded by Gustavo Barroso
