= Cícero Sandroni =

Brazilian journalist and writer (1935–2025)

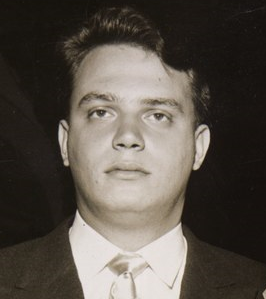
Cícero Sandroni in 1958

Cícero Augusto Ribeiro Sandroni (26 February 1935 – 17 June 2025) was a Brazilian journalist and writer. He was born in São Paulo and became a journalist in Rio de Janeiro, where he worked for newspapers such as O Globo and Correio da Manhã and the news magazine Manchete. He also worked in publishing and in broadcast media.

== Career ==
Sandroni wrote a number of books, among them Cosme Velho: o rio das letras do Rio and a biography of fellow journalist Carlos Heitor Cony.

Sandroni was elected to the Brazilian Academy of Letters in 2004.

== Death ==
Sandroni died in Rio de Janeiro on 17 June 2025, at the age of 90.

== Works ==
- The Devil Only Arrives at Noon, short stories, Nova Fronteira Publishing, 1985.
- Glass in Brazil, historical essay, Objetiva Publishing, 1989.
- Austregésilo de Athayde, the Century of a Liberal, Agir Publishing, 1998.
- Cosme Velho, literary essay about the Cosme Velho neighborhood, Relume Dumará Publishing, 1999.
- 50 Years of O Dia, newspaper history, 2002
- The Fish of Amarna, novel, Record, 2003
- Batman Didn't Go to Búzios, 7 Letras, 2016
