= Fernando Magalhães =

Brazilian obstetrician

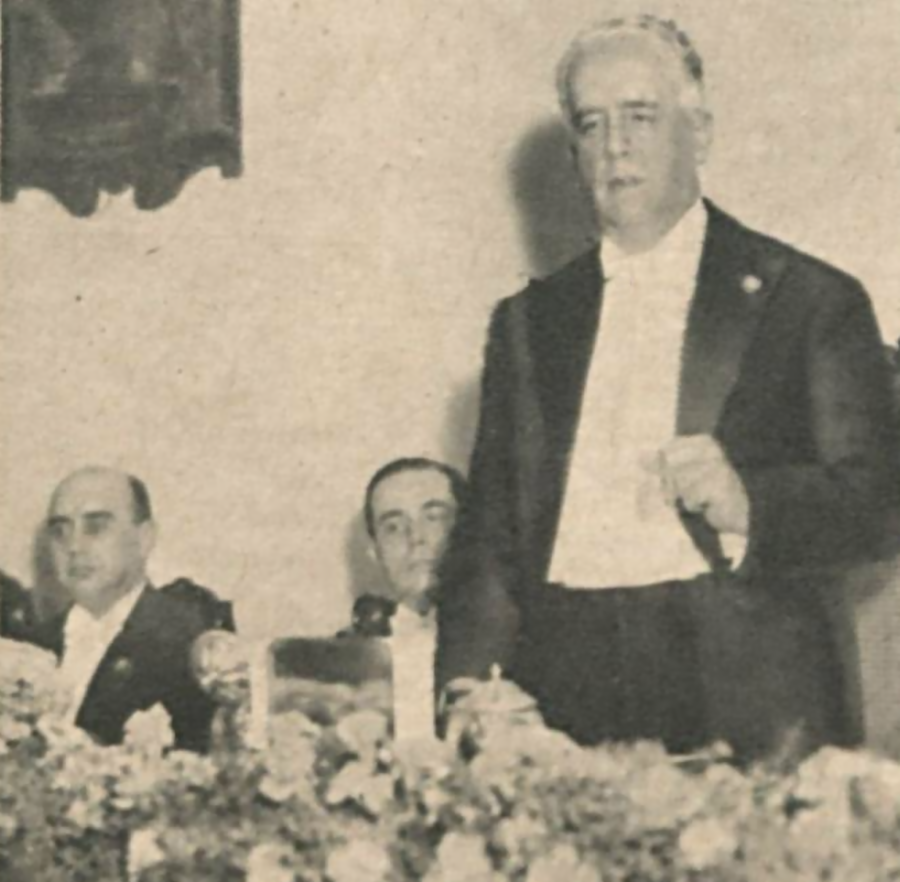
Fernando Magalhães in 1936

Fernando Magalhães (February 18, 1878 – January 10, 1944) was a Brazilian obstetrician who was twice President of the Academia Brasileira de Letras.
