= Matias Aires =

Brazilian-Portuguese philosopher and writer

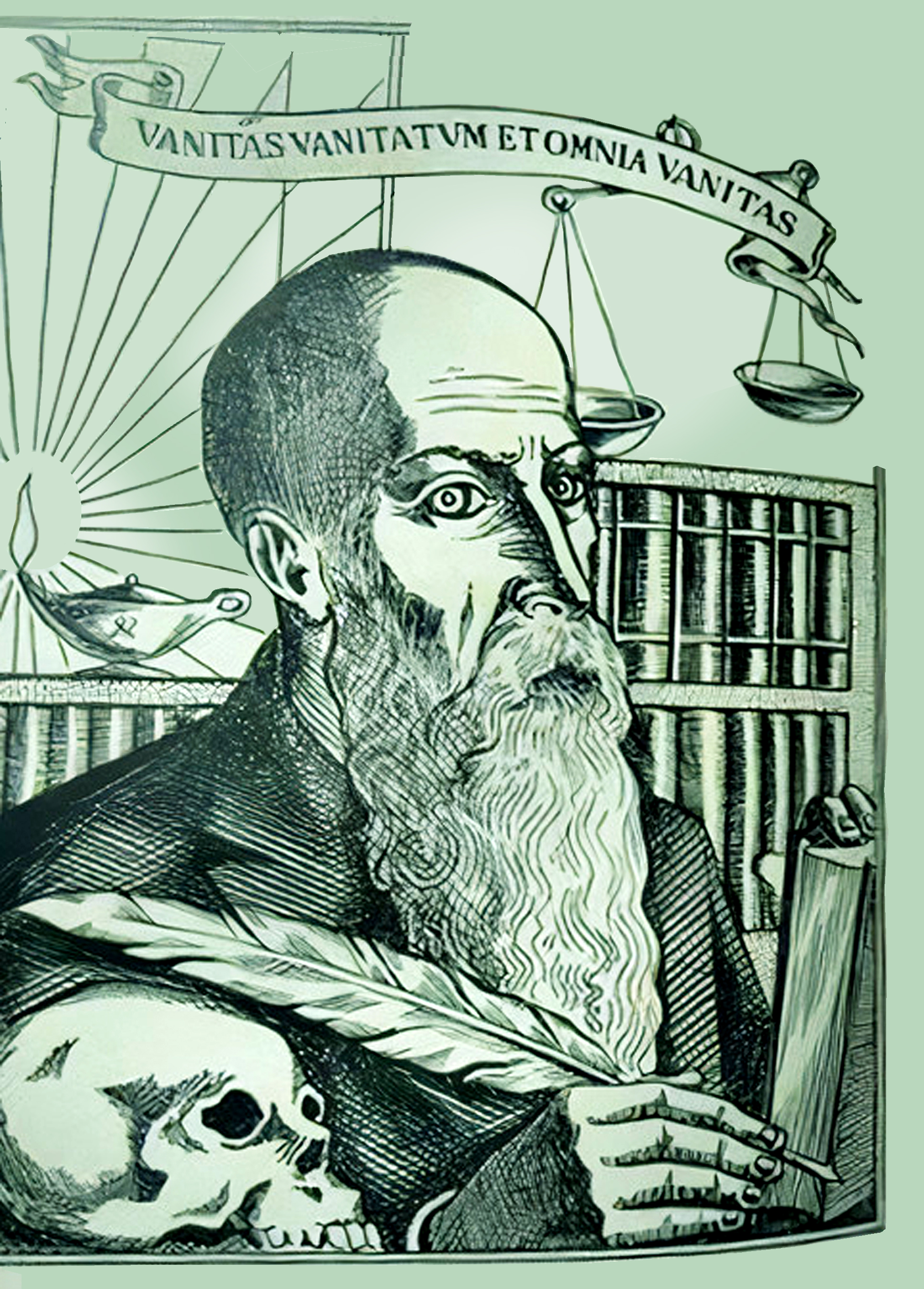
- Portrait of Matias Aires
- Born: Mathias Ayres Ramos da Silva d'Eça; 27 March 1705; São Paulo, State of Brazil
- Died: 10 October 1763 (aged 58); Brazil, Principate of Brazil

Education
- Education: Faculty of Law, University of Coimbra

Philosophical work
- Era: Renaissance philosophy
- Region: Western philosophy
- Notable ideas: Everything is vanity, Vanity typification

Matias Aires Ramos da Silva de Eça (born São Paulo, Brazil; 27 March 1705 – 1763) was a Brazilian-Portuguese philosopher and writer. He immigrated to Portugal in late 1716. Born in colony Brazil, he wrote works in French and Latin and was also a translator of Latin classics. It is considered by many to be the biggest name in 18th century Portuguese Language Philosophy.

== Family ==
Son of José Ramos da Silva and his wife Catarina de Orta, he was born in São Paulo, in the Capitania, in 1705, later Province and today State of São Paulo, Brazil. He was Knight of the Order of Christ and Provider of the Lisbon Mint, obtaining and succeeding in this job to his father since his death. It was in this reality that Matias Aires's father emerged as provider of the expeditions that found gold in the Gerais. The writer Alceu Amoroso Lima, in the introduction to the book by Matias Aires, makes the following comment: “The figure of José Ramos da Silva, and his rise as a servant to serve the highest magnate of the 18th century São Paulo fortune, became one of the most representative types of colonial Brazil. ” Blessed by luck, this new rich man became a great patron for the Jesuits of São Paulo, building churches, sending from Portugal, construction masters, stonemasons, cutters and gilders, in short, giving all the support to the convents and schools of the Order. It was in this environment that he was born.

== Education ==
Aires was educated at the Jesuit college in São Paulo, where he learned to read and write in Portuguese and Latin, also studying the classics and rudiments of religion and philosophy. When he was eleven years old, his father decided to move to Lisbon. For his qualities as a practical man and through good contacts with the Jesuits who enjoyed great prestige with D. João V, José Ramos da Silva was appointed to exercise the position of Provider of the Foundry Houses, one of the highest and most lucrative functions of the Kingdom. Concerned about the education of his children, when he arrived in Portugal, he enrolled the two girls in the Convent of Odivelas and Matias in the traditional and renowned Colégio de Santo Antão (English: College of Saint Anthony the Great).

Aires was admitted into the College of St. Anthony in 1722, though he continued his education and graduated from the Faculty of Law of Coimbra, in which he obtained his Bachelor of Arts degree.

He received a Bachelor of Philosophy from the Faculty of Sciences and a Master of Arts from the Faculty of Letters of the University of Coimbra. He graduated from a French University in Civil and Canon Law. He studied Mathematics and Physical Sciences. He knew Hebrew and other languages.

== Works ==
He wrote works in French and Latin, and also was a translator of Latin classics. He is considered the greatest Portuguese-speaking philosopher of his time.

Matias Aires published Vanity of Men was published in 1752. Like most of his works, it weaves his reflections from the biblical passage "Vanity of vanities, all is vanity." He also wrote Reflexoens Sobre Avaidade Dos Homens ou Discursos Moraes (1778) and Reflections on Vanity.
