= França Júnior =

Brazilian playwright (1838–1890)

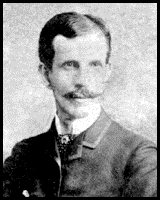
- Born: Joaquim José da França Júnior; 18 March 1838; Rio de Janeiro City, Rio de Janeiro, Brazil
- Died: 27 November 1890 (aged 52); Poços de Caldas, Minas Gerais, Brazil
- Education: University of São Paulo
- Occupations: Journalist, playwright
- Writing career
- Notable work: Maldita Parentela
- Movement: Romanticism

Joaquim José da França Júnior (March 18, 1838 – November 27, 1890) was a Brazilian playwright, journalist and, initially, a painter. Alongside Martins Pena, he is one of the most famous adepts of the "comedy of manners" genre.

He is patron of the 12th chair of the Brazilian Academy of Letters.

== Life ==
França Júnior was born in Rio de Janeiro, in 1838, to Joaquim José da França and Mariana Inácia Vitovi Garção da França. He studied in the Colégio Pedro II and at the Faculdade de Direito da Universidade de São Paulo. Graduating in 1862, he moves to Bahia, where he exerces his profession for some time.

Returning to Rio de Janeiro in 1880, he entered at the Escola Nacional de Belas Artes, where he studied under guidance of Georg Grimm. A member of the Grimm Group, he would later abandon the painting to dedicate himself only to literature.

His plays are famous for mocking and ridicularizing the situation of Brazil during the final years of the 19th century.

He died in 1890.

== Works ==
- Meia Hora de Cinismo (1861)
- A República-Modelo (1861)
- Tipos da Atualidade (1862)
- Ingleses na Costa (1864)
- Defeito de Família (1870)
- Amor com Amor se Paga (1870)
- Beijo de Judas (1881)
- Como se Fazia um Deputado (1881)
- Caiu o Ministério! (1882)
- Maldita Parentela (1887)
- Entrei para o Clube Jácome (1887)
- De Petrópolis a Paris (1889)
- As Doutoras (1889)
- Portugueses às Direitas (1890)

Preceded by New creation	Brazilian Academy of Letters - Patron of the 12th chair	Succeeded by Urbano Duarte de Oliveira (founder)
