= Evanildo Bechara =

Brazilian teacher (1928–2025)

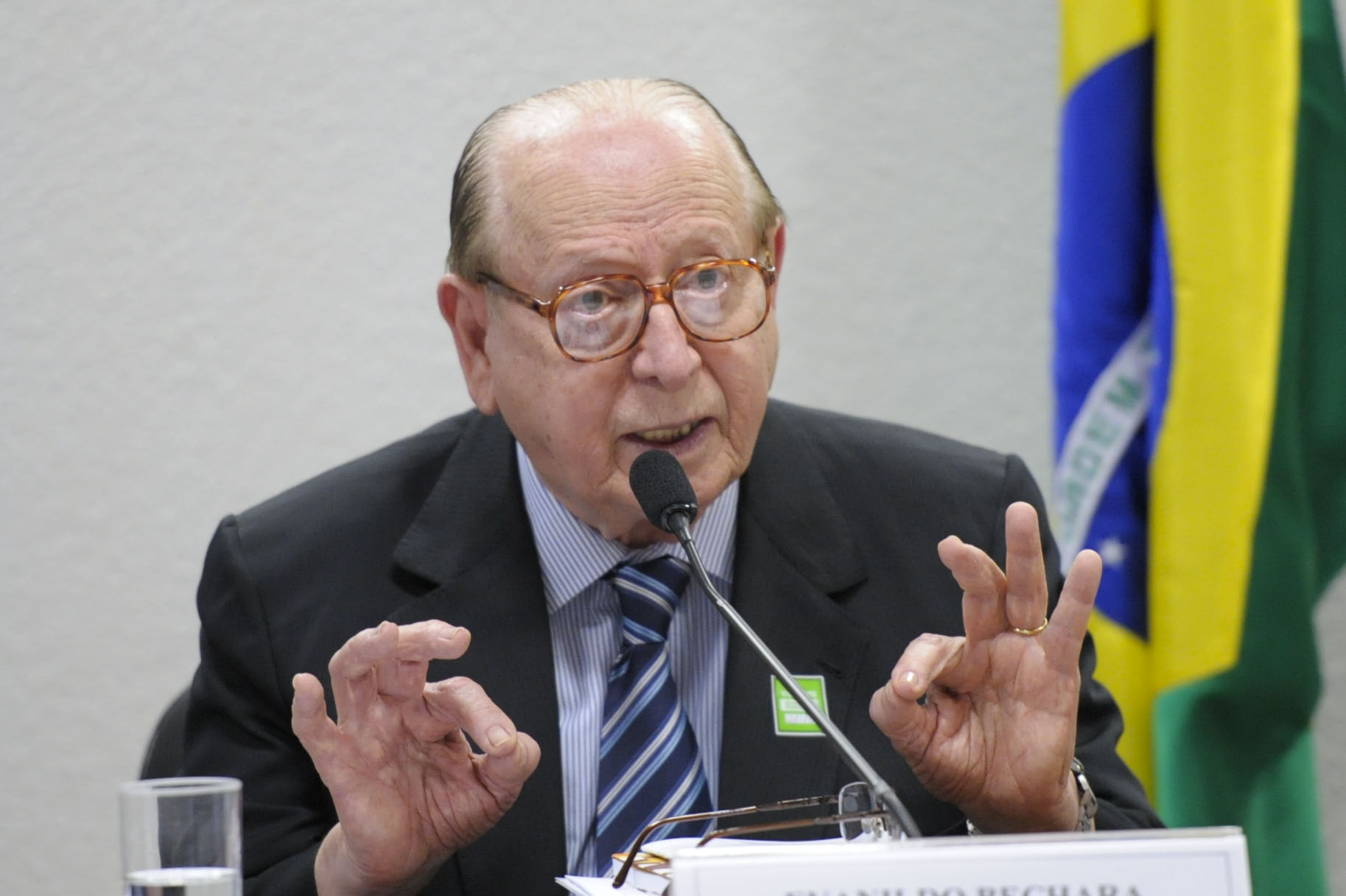
- Born: 26 February 1928; Recife, Pernambuco, Brazil
- Died: 22 May 2025 (aged 97); Rio de Janeiro, Brazil
- Occupations: grammarist, philologist

Evanildo Cavalcante Bechara (26 February 1928 – 22 May 2025) was a Brazilian grammarian and philologist.

== Life and career ==
Born in Recife, Bechara was a corresponding member of the Lisbon Academy of Sciences and the Galician Academy of the Portuguese Language, and an honorary doctorate from the University of Coimbra. He was a full and emeritus professor at the State University of Rio de Janeiro and the Fluminense Federal University, and also a full professor and the 50th general director of the Instituto Superior de Educação do Rio de Janeiro (ISERJ), in addition to holder of chair number 16 of the Brazilian Academy of Philology and chair 33 of the Brazilian Academy of Letters.

Bechara was the author of several grammars of the Portuguese language aimed at both the general public and professionals: Moderna Gramática Portuguesa (37th edition, Rio de Janeiro; Editora Lucerna, 1999); Gramática Escolar da Língua Portuguesa (1st edition, Rio de Janeiro; Editora Lucerna, 2001); Lições de Português pela Análise Sintática (18th edition, Rio de Janeiro; Editora Lucerna, 2004).

He was also editor of the magazine Confluência, dedicated to linguistic themes, edited by Liceu Literário Português. Between 1971 and 1976, he edited the magazine Littera (16 volumes) for teachers of Portuguese and Portuguese-language literature.

Bechara died in Rio de Janeiro on 22 May 2025, at the age of 97.
