= Múcio Leão =

Brazilian journalist and author (1898–1969)

Múcio Carneiro Leão (1898–1969) was a Brazilian journalist and author.

== Life ==
Leão was born and raised in Recife. Upon finishing his law studies, he moved to Rio de Janeiro where he became a journalist. During the 1920s and 1930s he worked for newspapers such as Jornal do Brasil and Correio da Manhã. He co-founded the newspaper A Manhã; its literary supplement Autores e Livros would become an important publication in Brazilian literature.

Leão wrote more than a dozen books, covering all aspects of literature. He succeeded Humberto de Campos to the Brazilian Academy of Letters and served that institution in various capacities for several decades. He died in Rio de Janeiro in 1969.
