= Murilo Melo Filho =

Brazilian journalist (1928–2020)

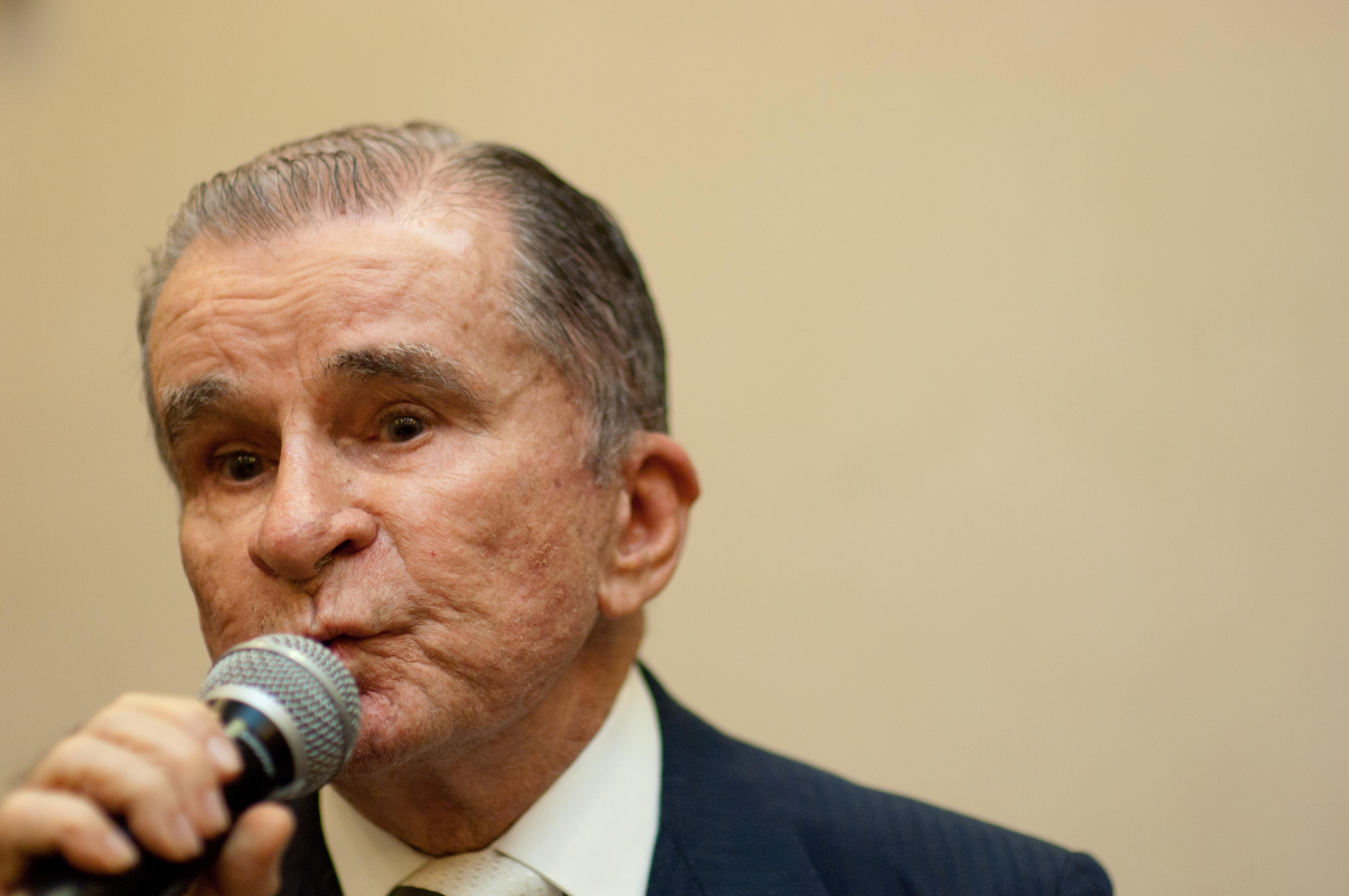
- Born: 13 October 1928; Natal, Rio Grande do Norte, Brazil
- Died: 27 May 2020 (aged 91); Rio de Janeiro, Brazil
- Education: Pontifical Catholic University of Rio de Janeiro; Federal University of Rio de Janeiro
- Occupation(s): Author, journalist, politician

Murilo Melo Filho (13 October 1928 - 27 May 2020) was a Brazilian author, journalist and politician. He was a member of the Academia Brasileira de Letras, an elite group of 40 writers and poets similar to France's Académie Française, occupying Chair no 20, in succession to Aurélio de Lira Tavares. He was also a member of the regional Academia Norte-Riograndense de Letras, occupying Chair no 19. He was a member of the administrative council of the Associação Brasileira de Imprensa (the Brazilian Press Association)

He was born in Natal, Rio Grande do Norte, the son of Murilo Melo and Hermínia de Freitas Melo. He worked on A República, a periodical published in his home town. From 1952 to 1958 he worked on the Tribuna da Imprensa under Carlos Lacerda.
