= Vítor Viana =

Brazilian journalist (1881–1937)

Vítor Viana (Rio de Janeiro, 23 December 1881 — Rio de Janeiro, 21 August 1937) was a Brazilian journalist, lawyer and historian. He was an advocate of "modern democracy" and member of the Academia Brasileira de Letras from 1935.
