= Antonio Carlos Secchin =

Brazilian writer and academic

Antonio Carlos Secchin (Italian: [ˈsek.kɪn]) is a Brazilian writer and academic.

== Literary awards ==
- first place in the Essay category from the National Book Institute (1983);
- Sílvio Romero Award, from the Brazilian Academy of Letters, 1985, for João Cabral: a Poesia do Menos
- Premio Alphonsus de Guimaraens Award, from the Fundação Biblioteca Nacional (2002)
- Poetry Award of the Brazilian Academy of Letters (2003)
- Prêmio Nacional do PEN Clube do Brasil (2003), for Todos os Ventos (best poetry book)

In 2004, Secchin was elected as the 7th Chair No. 19 of the Brazilian Academy of Letters, succeeding Marcos Almir Madeira.
