= Joaquim Caetano da Silva =

Brazilian politician (1790–1862)

Joaquim Caetano da Silva (Desterro, ca. 1790 – Desterro, 2 October 1862) was a Brazilian Liberal Party politician.

He was a deputy of the Legislative Assembly of Santa Catarina in the 1st legislature, and substituted in the 4th legislature, 5th legislature, 6th legislature, and 9th legislature.

== Sources ==
Bibliography

- Piazza, Walter: Dicionário Político Catarinense. Florianópolis: Assembleia Legislativa do Estado de Santa Catarina, 1985.
