= Fernando Bastos de Ávila =

Brazilian priest (1918–2010)

Fernando Bastos de Ávila (March 17, 1918 – November 6, 2010) was a Brazilian Roman Catholic priest. A member of the Society of Jesus, de Ávila was a member of the Academia Brasileira de Letras and vice-chancellor of Pontificía Universidade Católica.
