= Rachel de Queiroz =

Brazilian author, translator and journalist (1910–2003)

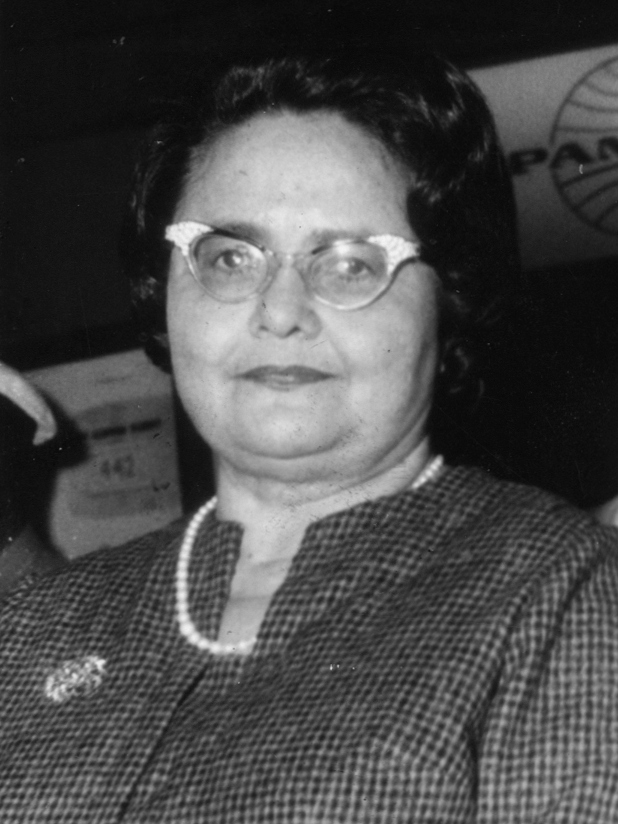
- Rachel de Queiroz (1971), from the collection of the Brazilian National Archives
- Born: November 17, 1910; Fortaleza, Ceará, Brazil
- Died: November 4, 2003 (aged 92); Leblon, Rio de Janeiro, Brazil
- Writing career
- Pen name: Rita de Queiroz
- Notable work: O Quinze
- Notable awards: Camões Prize; Prêmio Jabuti

Rachel de Queiroz (Brazilian Portuguese: [ʁaˈkɛw dʒi ˈkejɾɔs], November 17, 1910 – November 4, 2003) was a Brazilian author, translator and journalist.

== Biography ==
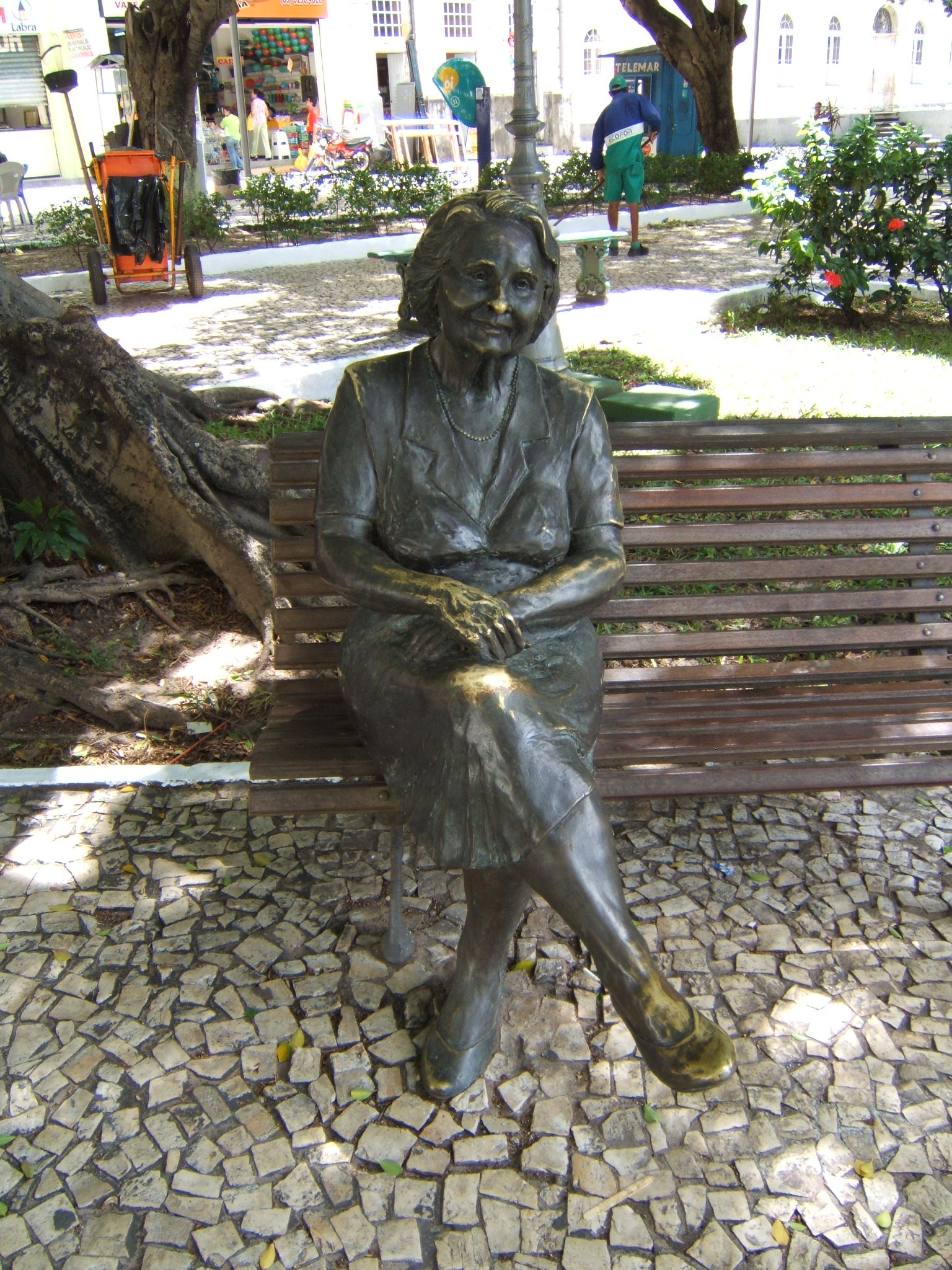
Statue of Rachel de Queiroz in Fortaleza, capital of Ceará

Rachel de Queiroz was born on November 17, 1910 in Fortaleza, capital of the northeastern state of Ceará. During her childhood, her family spent a couple of years in Rio de Janeiro and Belém before moving back to Fortaleza.

She began her career in journalism in 1927 under the pen name "Rita de Queiroz". She entered the national spotlight with the unexpected success of her debut novel O Quinze in 1930. She published another three novels before moving to Rio in 1939. She was also renowned for her chronicles, short topical newspaper pieces.

De Queiroz joined the Brazilian Communist Party in the 1930s; she was arrested by the Getulio Vargas police in 1937; she would break off with the party later that decade. In 1964 she supported the Brazilian military coup d'état.

In 1964 she became Brazil's representative to the UN, and in 1977 she became the first female writer to enter the Academia Brasileira de Letras. She won the Camões Prize (1993) and the Prêmio Jabuti.

She died of a heart attack in her apartment in Leblon, Rio de Janeiro on November 4, 2003, about two weeks before her 93rd birthday.

Rachel de Queiroz in the Academia Brasileira de Letras, 1977.

The Brazilian Marines' base in the UN peacekeeping mission in Haiti (MINUSTAH) is named after her.

== Brazilian Academy of Letters ==
Her election, on November 4, 1977, to seat 5 of the Brazilian Academy of Letters, caused some excitement among the feminists of the time. In an interview, she declared: I did not join the ABL because I was a woman. I joined because, regardless of that, I have a work. I have dear friends here. Almost all my friends are men, I don't trust women very much.

Received by Adonias Filho, she was the fifth occupant of the chair whose patron is Bernardo Guimarães.

== Legacy ==
Her novel O Quinze was made into a film in 2004.

On November 17, 2017, Google celebrated her 107th birthday with a Google Doodle.

== Works ==
=== Novels ===
- (1930) O Quinze
- (1932) João Miguel
- (1937) O caminho das pedras
- (1939) As três Marias
- (1950) O galo de ouro
- (1975) Dora Doralina
- (1992) Memorial de Maria Moura

=== Drama ===
- (1953) Lampião
- (1958) A Beata Maria do Egito

=== Collections of chronicles ===
- (1963) O brasileiro perplexo
- (1967) O caçador de tatu
- (1976) As menininhas e outras crônicas

=== Non-fiction ===
- (1998) Tantos anos (co-authored with her sister, Maria Luíza)
