= Marco Lucchesi =

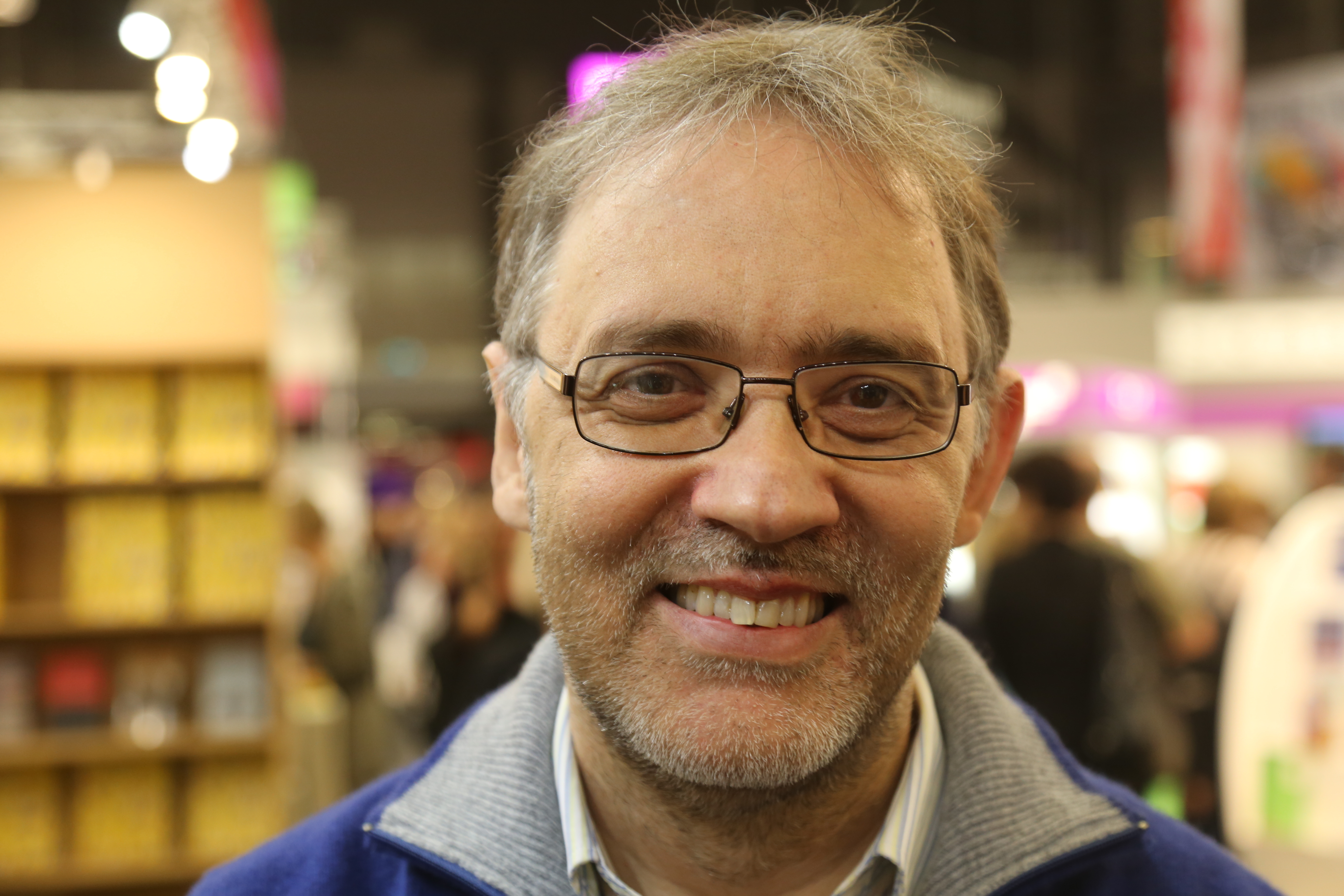
- Born: December 9, 1963 (age 62) Rio de Janeiro, Brazil
- Occupation: Poet; writer; essayist; translator; historian; Esperantist

Marco Americo Lucchesi (born 9 December 1963) is a Brazilian poet, writer, historian, essayist, translator and Esperantist, member of the Academia Brasileira de Letras since 2011. He is also full professor of Languages at Federal University of Rio de Janeiro.

== Life and career ==
Marco Lucchesi was born in Copacabana, Rio de Janeiro, child of italian parents: Elena Dati and Egidio Lucchesi, a radio communications engineer; they immigrated to Brazil at the invitation of Assis Chateaubriand to work in his radio broadcasting system. He had a bilingual childhood, speaking Italian and Portuguese.

He graduated in History from the Fluminense Federal University and graduated as a Master and Doctor in Literature Science from the Federal University of Rio de Janeiro, and as a Post-Doctor in Renaissance Philosophy from the University of Cologne in Germany. He has been a professor of Comparative Literature at UFRJ since 1989, a researcher at the National Council for Scientific and Technological Development (CNPq) and a visiting professor at several international institutions.

He was elected the youngest president of the Academia Brasileira de Letras in the last seventy years, at age 47, in 7 December 2017.

His books have been translated into Arabic, Romanian, Italian, English, French, German, Spanish, Persian, Russian, Turkish, Polish, Hindi, Swedish, Hungarian, Urdu, Bangla and Latin. He was editor of the magazines Poesia Semper, Tempo Brasileiro (from 2007 to 2015 – vol. 171 to 203) and Mosaico Italiano (from 2005 to 2008 – ed. 21 to 52). Between 2012 and 2017 he was director of phase VIII of the Revista Brasileira da ABL, having coordinated the publication of issues 70 to 93. He is a member of the board of Editora UFRJ (2016–2020), as well as several scientific and literary magazines in Brazil, in Latin America and Europe. He has been a consultant and prepared originals for the publishers Record, Nova Fronteira, Nova Aguilar, José Olympio, Civilização Brasileira and Bem-Te-Vi. He was also a columnist for the newspaper O Globo from 2010 to 2018.

Lucchesi also stood out in the General Coordination of Research and Publishing sector of the National Library, where he was responsible for editing catalogs and facsimiles in the period between 2006 and 2011. He was curator of exhibitions at the National Library, such as those celebrating the hundredth anniversary of the death of two Brazilian writers: "Machado de Assis, cem anos de uma cartografia inacabada" (2008), and "A poetics of Brazilian space, about Euclides da Cunha" (2009). In 2010, he was responsible for the large exhibition "National Library 200 years: a defense of the infinite".

He translated several authors, including, published in book form, two novels by Umberto Eco, Scienza Nuova, by Vico, the poems from the novel Doctor Zhivago, works by Guillevic, Primo Levi, Rumi, Hölderlin, Khliebnikov, Trakl, Juan de la Cruz, Francisco Quevedo, and Angelus Silesius. Having knowledge of more than twenty languages, "he even created an artificial language called 'laputar'".

He has received several awards, including the Alceu Amoroso Lima Award, for poetic work as a whole (2008), the Marin Sorescu award, in Romania (2006), and the Ministero dei Beni Culturali Award in Italy. He was awarded the Jabuti Prize three times and received the title of Doctor Honoris Causa at the Tibiscus University (Romania, 2016).

In January 2023, Lucchesi was appointed by the Minister of Culture of the Lula da Silva government, Margareth Menezes, to preside over the National Library, in Rio de Janeiro. In May of the same year, he assumed the presidency of the institution. In July, he was awarded the National Order of Scientific Merit by President Luiz Inácio Lula da Silva, in recognition of his work and contribution to the scientific field in the country.
