= Brazilian Academy of Letters =

Brazilian literary non-profit society

- Academia Brasileira de Letras

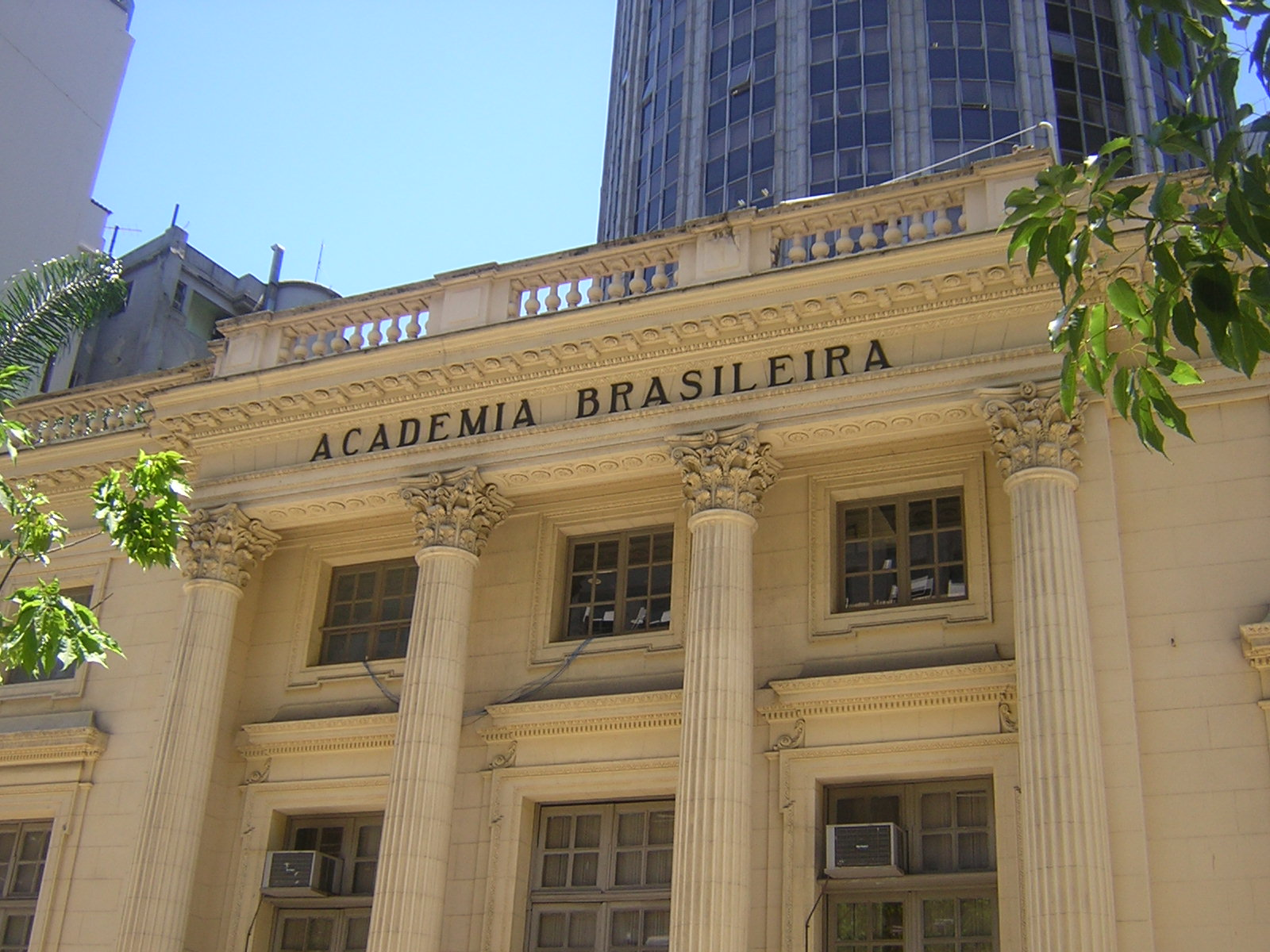
- Abbreviation: ABL
- Formation: 20 July 1897; 129 years ago
- Location: Rio de Janeiro, Brazil
- Members: 40 members
- Official language: Portuguese
- President: Merval Pereira
- Website: www.academia.org.br

The Brazilian Academy of Letters (Portuguese: Academia Brasileira de Letras, ABL; Portuguese pronunciation: [akadeˈmiɐ bɾaziˈlejɾɐ dʒi ˈletɾɐs]) is a Brazilian literary non-profit society established at the end of the 19th century. The first president, Machado de Assis, declared its foundation on 15 December 1896, with the by-laws being passed on 28 January 1897. On 20 July 1897, the academy started its operation.

According to its statutes, it is the pre-eminent Portuguese council for matters pertaining to the Portuguese language. The ABL is considered the foremost institution devoted to the Portuguese language in Brazil. Its prestige and technical qualification gives it paramount authority in Brazilian Portuguese, even though it is not a public institution and no law grants it oversight over the language. The academy's main publication in this field is the Orthographic Vocabulary of the Portuguese Language (Vocabulário Ortográfico da Língua Portuguesa) which has five editions. The Vocabulary is prepared by the academy's Commission on Lexicology and Lexicography. If a word is not included in the Vocabulary, it is considered not to exist as a correct word in Brazilian Portuguese.

Since its beginning and to this day, the academy is composed of 40 members, known as the "immortals". These members are chosen from among citizens of Brazil who have published works or books with recognized literary value. The position of "immortal" is awarded for the lifetime. New members are admitted by a vote of the academy members when one of the "chairs" become vacant. The chairs are numbered and each has a Patron: the Patrons are 40 great Brazilian writers that were already dead when the ABL was founded; the names of the Patrons were chosen by the Founders as to honour them post mortem by assigning patronage over a chair. Thus, each chair is associated with its current holder, her or his predecessors, the original Founder who occupied it in the first place, and also with a Patron.

The academicians use formal gala gilded uniforms with a sword (the uniform is called "fardão") when participating in official meetings at the academy. The body has the task of acting as an official authority on the language; it is charged with publishing an official dictionary of the language. Its rulings, however, are not binding on either the public or the government.

== History ==
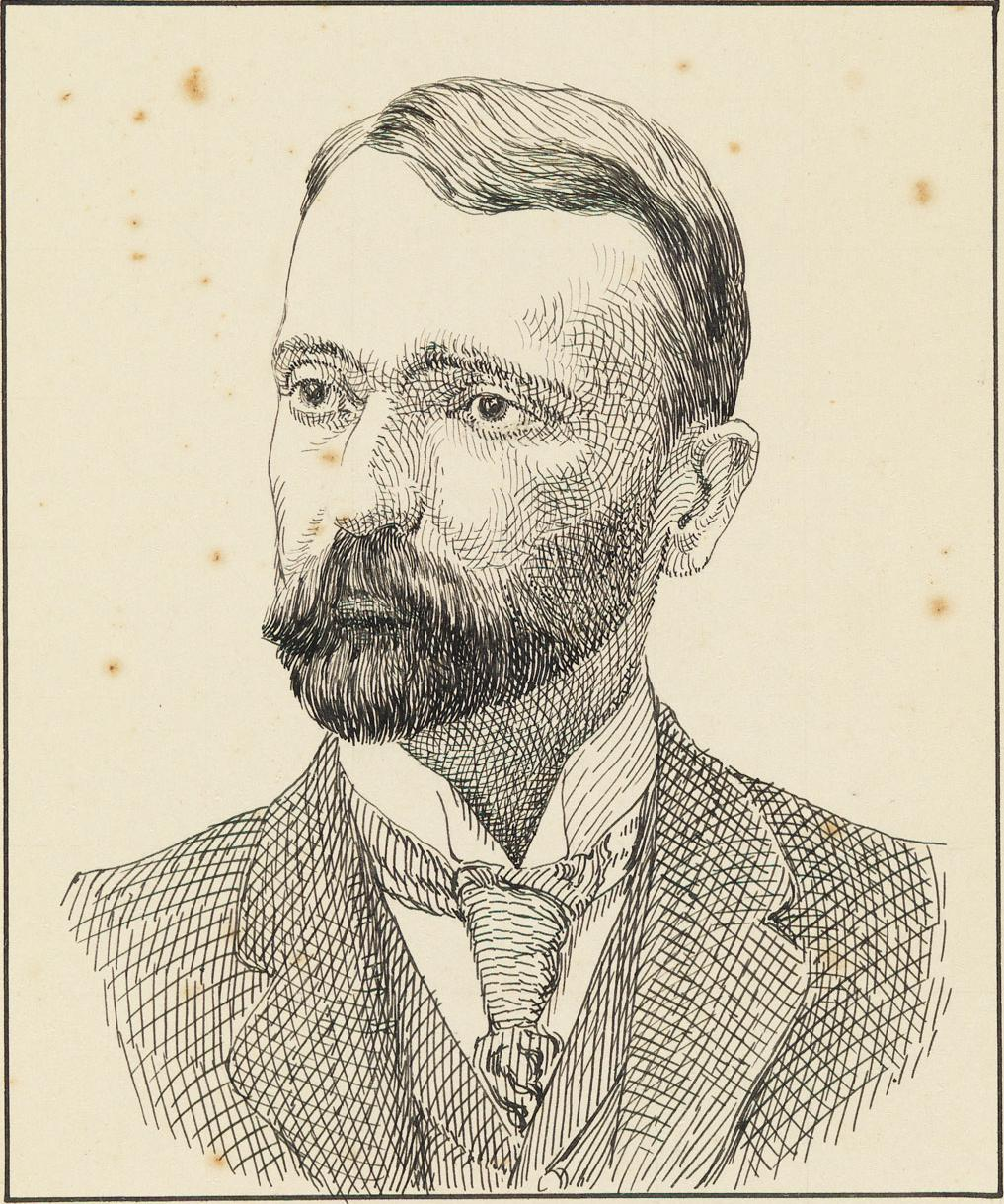
Lúcio de Mendonça, founder of the ABL

=== Foundation ===
The initiative to establish the ABL was taken by Lúcio de Mendonça and was realised in preparatory meetings that began on 15 December 1896, under the presidency of Machado de Assis. The statuses of the Brazilian Academy of Letters and the membership of the 40 founding fathers were approved at these meetings, on 28 January 1897. On 20 July of the same year, the inaugural session was held at the Pedagogium's facility in the centre of Rio de Janeiro.

Without appointed headquarters or financial resources, the solemn meetings of the academy were held at the hall of the Royal Portuguese Cabinet of Reading, at the premises of the former National Gymnasium and at the Noble Hall of the Ministry of the Interior. The joint sessions were held at the law firm of Rodrigo Octávio, the ABL's first secretary's, at Quitanda Street, 47.

In 1904, the academy obtained the left wing of the Brazilian Silogeo, a governmental building that housed other cultural institutions. It remained there until moving to its own headquarters in 1923.

=== Petit Trianon ===
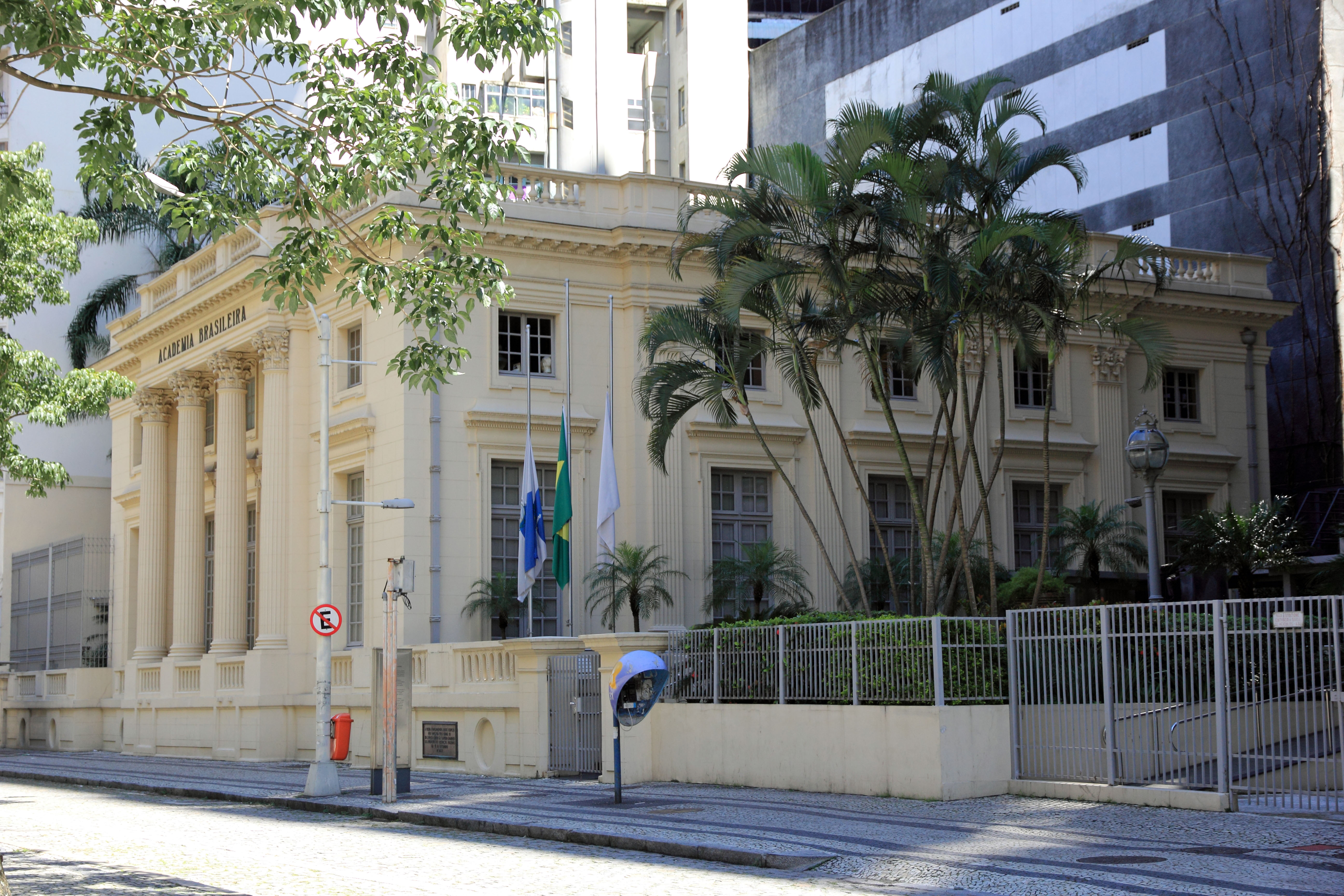
The Petit Trianon in Rio de Janeiro, the seat of the academy since 1923

In 1923, thanks to the initiative of its president at the time, Afrânio Peixoto and of the then-French ambassador, Raymond Conty, the French government donated the French Pavilion building to the academy. The building had been built for the Independence of Brazil's Centenary International Exposition by the architect Ange-Jacques Gabriel, between 1762 and 1768 and was a replica of the Petit Trianon of Versailles.

These facilities have been inscribed as Brazilian Cultural heritage since Monday, 9 November 1987, by the State Institute of Cultural Heritage (INEPAC), of the Municipal Secretary of Culture of Rio de Janeiro. To the present day, its halls continue to host regular meetings, solemn sessions, commemorative meetings and inauguration sessions of the new academics, as well as the traditional Thursdays' tea. They are also open to the public for guided tours or for special cultural programs, such as chamber music concerts, book launches, conference cycles and theatre plays.

In the buildings' first floor hall stands the decorated marble floor, a French crystal chandelier, a large white porcelain vase from Sèvres and four English bas-reliefs. Inside the building, the following premises stand out:

- the Noble Hall, where the solemn sessions take place;
- the French Hall, where the new members traditionally remain alone, in reflection;
- the Francisco Alves Room, where an oil painting on canvas of a collective of nineteenth-century writers and intellectuals, by the painter Rodolfo Amoedo, is depicted;
- the Hall of the Founders, decorated with period furniture and paintings by Candido Portinari;
- the Machado de Assis Room, decorated with the writer's desk, books and personal belongings, such as portrait by painter Henrique Bernardelli;
- the Hall of Romantic Poets, which holds bronze busts of Castro Alves, Fagundes Varela, Gonçalves Dias, Casimiro de Abreu and Álvares de Azevedo, by Brazilian-Mexican sculptor Rodolfo Bernardelli.

On the second floor, one can find the Sessions Room, the Library the Tea Room. The Tea Room is the academics' meeting point before the Plenary Session, on Thursdays. The Library is used by scholars and researchers and holds a collection of Manuel Bandeira.

=== Dictatorship era ===
The Dictator Getúlio Vargas being invested as member of the academy in 1943

During periods like the Vargas' totalitarian dictatorship or the Brazilian military government, the academy's neutrality in choosing proper members dedicated to the literary profession was compromised with the election of politicians with few or no contributions to literature, such as ex-president and dictator Getúlio Vargas in 1943. The academy is also accused of not having defended culture expression and freedom of speech during both Vargas' Era and during the military dictatorship. Both of these ruling periods imposed heavy censorship on Brazilian culture, including Brazilian literature.

=== Present day ===
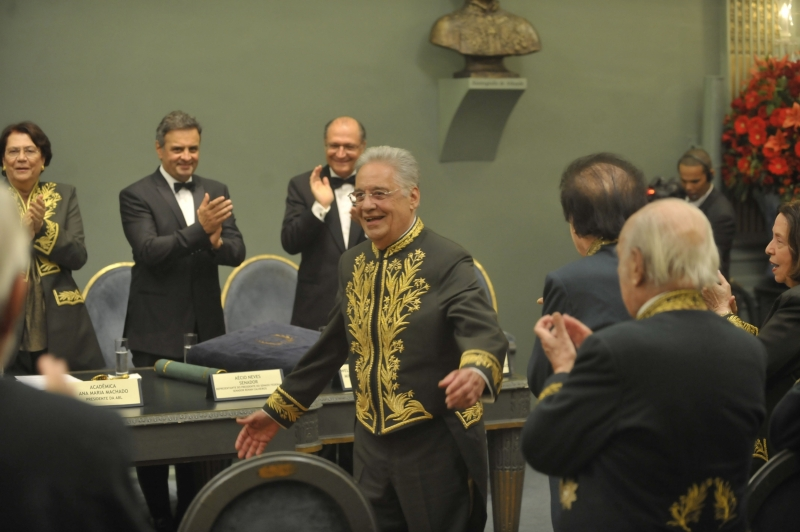
The writer Fernando Henrique Cardoso, ex-President of Brazil, taking possession as a member of the academy in 2013

Thanks to revenues over $ 4 million a year, the academy is financially stable. It owns a skyscraper with 28 floors (Palácio Austregésilo de Athayde) in the centre of Rio, which the academy rents for office space, generating 70% of its current revenue. The rest comes from rental of other buildings, which were inherited from book editor Francisco Alves, in 1917, and from other financial investments. This comfortable situation allows the payment of a "jeton" to each academician.

The academy annually awards several literary prizes:

- the Prêmio Machado de Assis, the most important literature prize in the country, awarded for lifework
- the ABL prizes for poetry, fiction, drama, essays, history of the literature and for children's literature
- the José Lins do Rego prize, an extraordinary commemorative prize awarded in 2001
- the Afonso Arinos prize, an extraordinary commemorative prize awarded in 2005

The academy also publishes a literary periodical, the Brazilian Review (Revista Brasileira), with quarterly editions.

== Orthographic Vocabulary ==
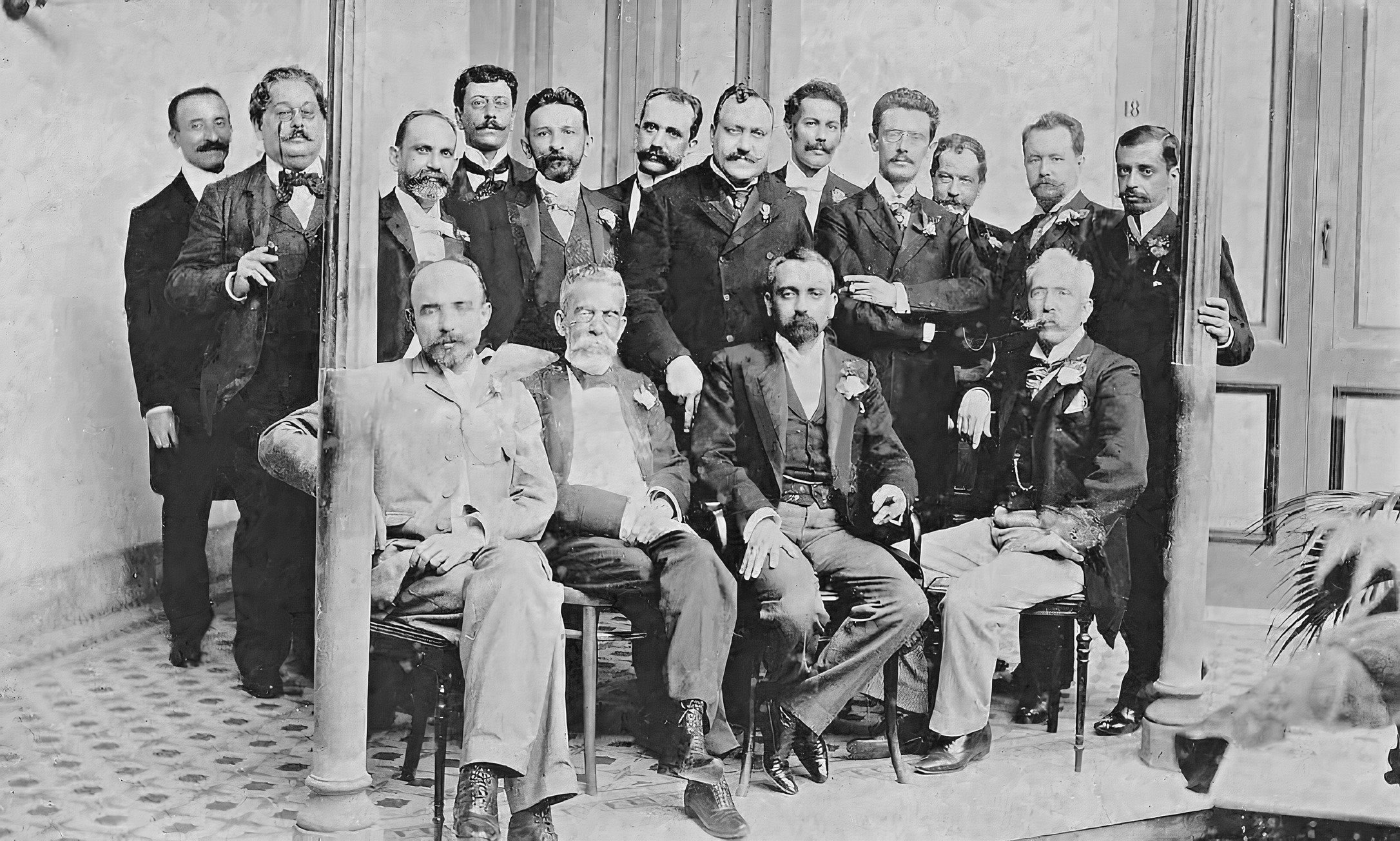
Standing: Rodolfo Amoedo, Artur Azevedo, Inglês de Souza, Bilac, Veríssimo, Bandeira, Filinto de Almeida, Passos, Magalhães, Bernardelli, Rodrigo Octavio, Peixoto; seated: João Ribeiro, Machado, Lúcio de Mendonça and Silva Ramos

The academy's main publication in this field is the Orthographic Vocabulary of the Portuguese Language (Vocabulário Ortográfico da Língua Portuguesa) of which there are five editions. The Vocabulary is prepared by the ABL's Commission on Lexicology and Lexicography. If a word is not included in the Vocabulary, it is considered not to exist as a correct word in Brazilian Portuguese.

The Orthographic Vocabulary, however, is not a dictionary, as it contains words and their grammatical categories, but not the definition or meaning of the words listed. Thus, unlike the French Academy, the Royal Spanish Academy and other foreign institutions dedicated to the care of a national language, the Brazilian Academy of Letters hasn't published an official dictionary. It has, however, published a School Dictionary of the Portuguese Language (Dicionário Escolar da Língua Portuguesa), with students as its target customers, in 2009.

The ABL does plan to publish a full and official Dictionary. For the time being, however, other dictionaries such as the Aurélio and the Houaiss remain more prestigious than the School Dictionary, in spite of the fact that the latter is sometimes marketed by booksellers as the "ABL's Dictionary", due to its being authored by the academy. Both the Houaiss and the Aurélio Dictionaries, however, were first compiled by members of the academy Antônio Houaiss and Aurélio Buarque de Holanda Ferreira, respectively. The preparation of an official dictionary of the Portuguese language is a stated goal of the Brazilian Academy of Letters.

== Members ==
=== Patrons and current members ===
According to its statutes, the academy aims to promote the "culture of the national language". It comprises 40 effective and perpetual members, known as "immortals", each occupying a numbered chair. These members are Brazilian citizens with published works of relevant literary value. Besides these members, the ABL also comprises 20 correspondent members.

All members go through a solemn session, in which they wear the academy's official garment for the first time. During the ceremony, the new member makes a speech remembering her or his predecessor and all previous members that occupied the chair.

The ABL, which was a traditionally male institution, elected its first female member on Friday, 4 November 1977 – the novelist Rachel de Queiroz. This groundbreaking election of the novelist opened the path for other female members. The academy currently has six members (15% of its total membership).

The current members, as of November 2026 are:

Chair	Patron	Current member	Origin	Elected	Age when elected	Current age	Time in chair
1	Adelino Fontoura	Ana Maria Machado	Rio de Janeiro	2003	61	84	23 years, 6 months and 21 days
2	Álvares de Azevedo	Eduardo Giannetti	Minas Gerais	2021	64	69	4 years, 10 months and 29 days
3	Artur de Oliveira	Joaquim Falcão	Rio de Janeiro	2018	74	83	8 years, 6 months and 26 days
4	Basílio da Gama	Carlos Nejar	Rio Grande do Sul	1988	49	87	37 years, 11 months and 21 days
5	Bernardo Guimarães	Ailton Krenak	Minas Gerais	2023	70	73	3 years, 1 month and 9 days
6	Casimiro de Abreu	Milton Hatoum	Amazonas	2025	72	74	6 months and 21 days
7	Castro Alves	Míriam Leitão	Minas Gerais	2025	72	73	1 year, 3 months and 6 days
8	Cláudio Manuel da Costa	Ricardo Cavaliere	Rio de Janeiro	2023	69	73	3 years, 6 months and 18 days
9	Gonçalves de Magalhães	Lilia Moritz Schwarcz	São Paulo	2024	66	68	2 years, 8 months and 7 days
10	Evaristo da Veiga	Rosiska Darcy de Oliveira	Rio de Janeiro	2013	69	82	13 years, 7 months and 3 days
11	Fagundes Varela	Ignácio de Loyola Brandão	São Paulo	2019	82	90	7 years, 7 months and 30 days
12	França Júnior	Paulo Niemeyer Filho	Rio de Janeiro	2021	69	74	4 years, 11 months and 27 days
13	Francisco Otaviano	Ruy Castro	Minas Gerais	2022	74	78	4 years, 1 month and 8 days
14	Franklin Távora	Celso Lafer	São Paulo	2006	64	85	20 years, 3 months and 24 days
15	Gonçalves Dias	Marco Lucchesi	Rio de Janeiro	2011	47	62	15 years, 8 months and 11 days
16	Gregório de Matos	Jorge Caldeira	São Paulo	2022	66	70	4 years, 4 months and 7 days
17	Hipólito da Costa	Fernanda Montenegro	Rio de Janeiro	2021	92	97	5 years and 10 days
18	João Francisco Lisboa	Arnaldo Niskier	Rio de Janeiro	1984	48	91	42 years, 7 months and 22 days
19	Joaquim Caetano da Silva	Antônio Carlos Secchin	Rio de Janeiro	2004	51	74	22 years, 5 months and 11 days
20	Joaquim Manuel de Macedo	Gilberto Gil	Bahia	2021	79	84	5 years and 3 days
21	Joaquim Serra	Paulo Coelho	Rio de Janeiro	2002	54	79	24 years, 3 months and 19 days
22	José Bonifácio	João Almino	Rio Grande do Norte	2017	66	76	9 years, 8 months and 6 days
23	José de Alencar	Antônio Torres	Bahia	2013	73	86	13 years and 7 days
24	Júlio Ribeiro	Geraldo Carneiro	Minas Gerais	2016	64	74	10 years and 17 days
25	Junqueira Freire	Alberto Venancio Filho	Rio de Janeiro	1991	57	92	35 years, 3 months and 19 days
26	Laurindo Rabelo	José Roberto de Castro Neves	Rio de Janeiro	2025	54	56	1 year, 4 months and 3 days
27	Maciel Monteiro	Edgard Telles Ribeiro	Chile	2024	80	82	1 year, 11 months and 3 days
28	Manuel Antônio de Almeida	Domício Proença Filho	Rio de Janeiro	2006	70	90	20 years, 7 months and 21 days
29	Martins Pena	Geraldo Holanda Cavalcanti	Pernambuco	2010	81	97	16 years, 5 months and 12 days
30	Pardal Mallet	Paulo Henriques Britto	Rio de Janeiro	2025	73	74	1 year, 2 months and 1 day
31	Pedro Luís Pereira de Sousa	Merval Pereira	Rio de Janeiro	2011	61	77	15 years, 5 months and 12 days
32	Manuel de Araújo Porto-Alegre	Drauzio Varella	São Paulo	2026	83	83	Not inducted
33	Raul Pompeia	Ana Maria Gonçalves	Minas Gerais	2025	54	56	1 year and 7 days
34	Sousa Caldas	Evaldo Cabral de Mello	Pernambuco	2014	71	83	12 years and 21 days
35	Tavares Bastos	Godofredo de Oliveira Neto	Santa Catarina	2022	71	75	4 years, 5 months and 5 days
36	Teófilo Dias	Fernando Henrique Cardoso	Rio de Janeiro	2013	82	95	13 years, 4 months and 18 days
37	Tomás António Gonzaga	Arno Wehling	Rio de Janeiro	2017	70	79	9 years, 8 months and 5 days
38	Tobias Barreto	José Sarney	Maranhão	1980	50	96	46 years, 3 months and 28 days
39	Francisco Adolfo de Varnhagen	José Paulo Cavalcanti Filho	Pernambuco	2021	73	78	4 years, 11 months and 20 days
40	Viscount of Rio Branco	Edmar Bacha	Minas Gerais	2016	74	84	10 years and 11 days

=== Correspondents ===
1. Alexandre de Gusmão
2. António José da Silva
3. Manuel Botelho de Oliveira
4. Eusébio de Matos
5. Francisco de Sousa
6. Matias Aires
7. Nuno Marques Pereira
8. Sebastião da Rocha Pita
9. Santa Rita Durão
10. Vicente do Salvador
11. Alexandre Rodrigues Ferreira
12. Antônio de Morais Silva
13. Domingos Borges de Barros
14. Francisco do Monte Alverne
15. Joaquim Gonçalves Ledo
16. José Bonifácio de Andrada e Silva
17. Odorico Mendes
18. Manuel Inácio da Silva Alvarenga
19. Sotero dos Reis
20. José da Silva Lisboa

== Presidents ==
The presidency of the Brazilian Academy of Letters has been held by members of the academy since its first years, beginning with Machado de Assis. The academy's historical list records presidents from 1897 through Merval Pereira, whose presidency began in 2022.

Term	Image	President
1897–1908	Photograph of Machado de Assis	Machado de Assis
1908–1919	Photograph of Ruy Barbosa	Ruy Barbosa
1919	Portrait of Domício da Gama	Domício da Gama
1919–1922	Portrait of Carlos de Laet	Carlos de Laet
1923		Afrânio Peixoto
1924	Portrait of Medeiros e Albuquerque	Medeiros e Albuquerque
1925	Portrait of Afonso Celso	Afonso Celso de Assis Figueiredo Júnior
1926	Portrait of Coelho Neto	Coelho Neto
1927	Portrait of Rodrigo Otávio	Rodrigo Otávio
1928	Portrait of Augusto de Lima	Augusto de Lima
1929	Portrait of Fernando Magalhães	Fernando Magalhães
1930	Portrait of Aloísio de Castro	Aloisio de Castro
1931–1932	Portrait of Fernando Magalhães	Fernando Magalhães
1932–1933	Portrait of Gustavo Barroso	Gustavo Barroso
1934	Portrait of Ramiz Galvão	Ramiz Galvão
1935	Portrait of Afonso Celso	Afonso Celso de Assis Figueiredo Júnior
1936	Portrait of Laudelino Freire	Laudelino Freire
1937	Photograph of Ataulfo de Paiva with Eurico Gaspar Dutra	Ataulfo de Paiva
1938		Cláudio de Sousa
1939	Portrait of Antônio Austregésilo	Antônio Austregésilo
1940	Portrait of Celso Vieira	Celso Vieira
1941	Photograph of Levi Carneiro with Peregrino Júnior	Levi Carneiro
1942–1943	Portrait of José Carlos de Macedo Soares	José Carlos de Macedo Soares
1944		Múcio Leão
1945	Portrait of Pedro Calmon	Pedro Calmon
1946		Cláudio de Sousa
1947	Portrait of João Neves da Fontoura	João Neves da Fontoura
1948	Portrait of Adelmar Tavares	Adelmar Tavares
1949		Miguel Osório de Almeida
1949–1950	Portrait of Gustavo Barroso	Gustavo Barroso
1951	Portrait of Aloísio de Castro	Aloisio de Castro
1952	Portrait of Aníbal Freire da Fonseca	Aníbal Freire da Fonseca
1953–1954	Portrait of Barbosa Lima Sobrinho	Barbosa Lima Sobrinho
1955		Rodrigo Otávio Filho
1956–1957	Portrait of Peregrino Júnior	Peregrino Júnior
1958		Elmano Cardim
1959–1993	Portrait of Austregésilo de Athayde	Austregésilo de Athayde
1993	Portrait of Abgar Renault	Abgar Renault
1994–1995		Josué Montello
1996	Portrait of Antônio Houaiss	Antônio Houaiss
1997	Portrait of Nélida Piñon	Nélida Piñon
1998–1999	Portrait of Arnaldo Niskier	Arnaldo Niskier
2000–2001	Portrait of Tarcísio Padilha	Tarcísio Padilha
2002–2003	Portrait of Alberto da Costa e Silva	Alberto da Costa e Silva
2004–2005	Portrait of Ivan Junqueira	Ivan Junqueira
2006–2007	Photograph of Marcos Vilaça	Marcos Vinicios Rodrigues Vilaça
2008–2009	Photograph of Cícero Sandroni	Cícero Sandroni
2010–2011	Photograph of Marcos Vilaça	Marcos Vinicios Rodrigues Vilaça
2012–2013	Photograph of Ana Maria Machado	Ana Maria Machado
2014–2015	Photograph of Geraldo Holanda Cavalcanti	Geraldo Holanda Cavalcanti
2016–2017	Photograph of Domício Proença Filho	Domício Proença Filho
2018–2021	Photograph of Marco Lucchesi	Marco Lucchesi
2022–present	Photograph of Merval Pereira	Merval Pereira

== See also ==
- List of members of the Brazilian Academy of Letters
- Brazilian literature
- Portuguese language
- Lisbon Academy of Sciences, Class of Letters
- International Portuguese Language Institute
- Galician Academy of the Portuguese Language
- Community of Portuguese Language Countries
- Brazilian Academy of Sciences
- Brazilian Academy of Fine Arts
- Brazilian Academy of Music
- Sociedade Partenon Literário
- Académie Française
