= Viriato Correia =

Brazilian politician (1884–1967)

- Born: Manuel Viriato Correia do Lago Filho; January 23, 1884; Pirapemas, Maranhão, Empire of Brazil
- Died: April 10, 1967 (aged 83); Rio de Janeiro, Guanabara (state), Brazil
- Occupations: journalist, writer, playwright, politician

Manuel Viriato Correia Baima do Lago Filho, or just Viriato Correia (January 23, 1884 – April 10, 1967), was a Brazilian journalist, writer, playwright and politician.

== Life and education ==
Viriato Correia was born in the city of Pirapemas, state of Maranhão, in 1884. He was the son of Manuel Viriato Correia Baima and Raimunda Silva Baima. Still small, he went to Sao Luis, to enter primary education at Colégio São Luís and, later, at secondary school, at Liceu Maranhense. His writing career started at 16, with poetry and short stories. Moving to Recife, after the preparatory course, he joined the Law School, which he studied for three years.

Initially, his plans were to move to Rio de Janeiro to finish college, but he joined the Carioca Bohemian life, a characteristic feature of most Brazilian intellectuals at the time. In Maranhão in 1903, Viriato published his first book, a collection called Minaretes, which marks the beginning of his career as a writer.

João Ribeiro was a fierce critic of the collection, believing that the title of Arab inspiration did not match the sertanejo tales included there. Correia completed a law course in Rio de Janeiro in 1907, but he worked little as a lawyer. Viriato excelled in literature, journalism and political career. Through Medeiros e Albuquerque, he got a job at Gazeta de Notícias. He has contributed, over the years, to several newspapers, such as Jornal do Brasil, Correio da Manhã, as well as magazines such as A Noite Ilustrada and O Tico-Tico. He was also the founder of two newspapers, Fafazinho and A Rua.

== Political activity ==
He entered politics in 1911, where he was elected state deputy in Maranhão and for the same state he was federal deputy in 1927 and 1930. He ended up moving away from politics in 1930 when he was arrested by the 1930 Revolution and went on to literature, where he wrote novels, plays, children's books and historical chronicles.

== Academia Brasileira de Letras ==
Viriato Correia was a member of the Brazilian Academy of Letters, being the third occupant of chair 32. He was elected on July 14, 1938, in succession to Ramiz Galvão, having been received by Múcio Leão on October 29, 1938.

== Death ==
Viriato died on April 10, 1967, in Rio de Janeiro, at the age of 83.

== Works ==
=== Historical chronicles ===
- Terra de Santa Cruz (1921)
- Histórias da nossa estória (1921)
- Brasil dos meus avós (1927)
- Baú velho (1927)
- Gaveta de sapateiro (1932)
- Alcovas da história (1934)
- Mata galego (1934)
- Casa de Belchior (1936)
- O país do pau de tinta (1939)
- Minaretes (1903)
- Contos do sertão (1912)
- Novelas doidas (1921)
- Histórias ásperas (1928)

=== Novel ===
- A Balaiada: romance histórico do tempo da Regência (1927)

=== Children's books ===
- Era uma vez... (1908)
- Contos da história do Brasil (1921)
- Varinha de condão (1928)
- Arca de Noé (1930)
- No reino da bicharada (1931)
- Quando Jesus nasceu (1931)
- A macacada (1931)
- Os meus bichinhos (1931)
- História do Brasil para crianças (1934)
- Meu torrão (1935)
- Bichos e bichinhos (1938)
- No país da bicharada (1938)
- Cazuza (1938)
- A descoberta do Brasil (1930)
- História de Caramuru (1939)
- A bandeira das esmeraldas (1945)
- As belas histórias da História do Brasil (1948)
- A macacada (1949)

=== Plays ===
- Sertaneja (1915)
- Manjerona (1916)
- Morena (1917)
- Sol do sertão (1918)
- Juriti (music composed by Chiquinha Gonzaga, 1919)
- Sapequinha (1920)
- Nossa gente (1924)
- Zuzú (1924)
- Uma noite de baile (1926)
- Pequetita (1927)
- Bombonzinho (1931)
- Sansão (1932)
- Maria (1933)
- Bicho papão (1936)
- O homem da cabeça de ouro (1936)
- A Marquesa de Santos (1938)
- Carneiro de batalhão (1938)
- O caçador de esmeraldas (1940)
- Rei de papelão (1941)
- Pobre diabo (1942)
- O príncipe encantador (1943)
- O gato comeu (1943)
- À sombra dos laranjais (1944)
- Estão cantando as cigarras (1945)
- Venha a nós (1946)
- Dinheiro é dinheiro (1949)
- O grande amor de Gonçalves Dias (1959).
