= Teófilo Dias =

Brazilian politician (1854–1889)

- Born: Teófilo Odorico Dias de Mesquita; 8 November 1854; Caxias, Maranhão, Empire of Brazil
- Died: 29 March 1889 (aged 34); São Paulo City, São Paulo, Brazil
- Education: University of São Paulo
- Occupations: Poet, journalist, lawyer
- Spouse: Gabriela Frederica Ribeiro de Andrada
- Relatives: Gonçalves Dias
- Writing career
- Notable work: Fanfarras
- Movements: Post-romanticism; Realism; Parnassianism

Teófilo Odorico Dias de Mesquita (November 8, 1854 – March 29, 1889) was a Brazilian poet, journalist and lawyer, nephew of the famous Romantic author Gonçalves Dias.

He is the patron of the 36th chair of the Brazilian Academy of Letters.

The literary critic Alfredo Bosi considers his 1882 work Fanfarras to have launched the Parnassian movement in Brazilian literature.

== Life ==
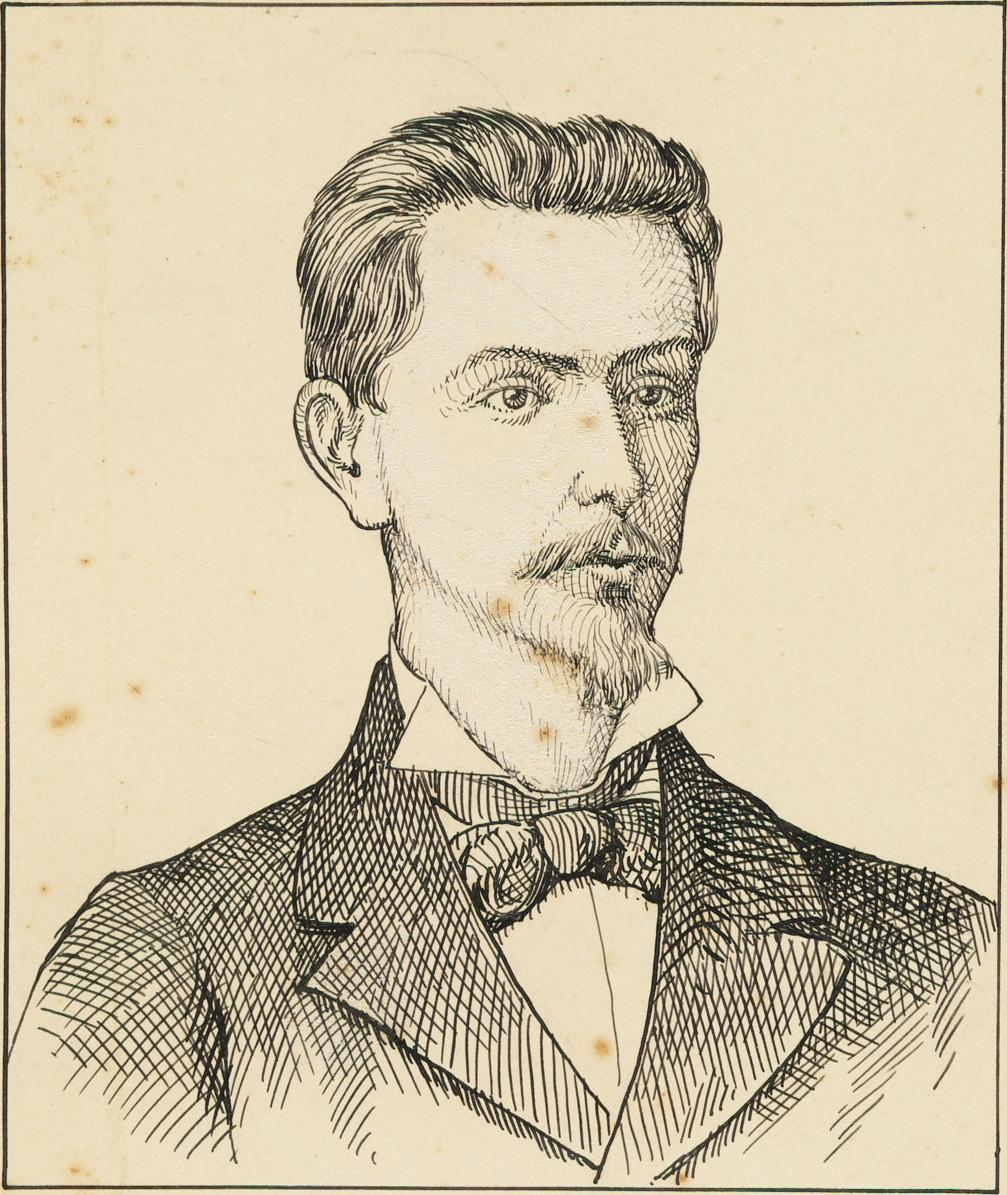
Teófilo Dias.

Teófilo Dias was born in 1854, to Odorico Antônio de Mesquita and Joana Angélica Dias de Mesquita (who was the sister of poet Gonçalves Dias). His initial schooling happened in São Luís, at the Instituto de Humanidades.

Moving to Rio de Janeiro, he was lodged in a convent for two years (1875–1876) and prepared to ingress at a Law course. In Rio, he met many influential people, such as Alberto de Oliveira, Artur de Oliveira, Aluísio Azevedo, Benjamin Constant Botelho de Magalhães, José do Patrocínio and Joaquim Maria Machado de Assis.

In 1881, he finished the Law course at the Faculdade de Direito da Universidade de São Paulo. As a journalist, he wrote for the newspapers A Província de São Paulo, A República and José Veríssimo's Revista Brasileira.

He was also a teacher of Philosophic Grammar and French in Colégio Aquino.

He married Gabriela Frederica Ribeiro de Andrada, a daughter of Martim Francisco Ribeiro de Andrada, the brother of famous statesman José Bonifácio de Andrada e Silva. He had with her two children.

He became a deputy in 1885, remaining in the post until the following year.

He died in 1889.

== Criticism ==
José Veríssimo, in "História da Literatura Brasileira", records that "The romantic inspiration so consonant with our literary nature, as we can see, had not totally faded away under the influence of the new poetics. Not only is it still visible in those poems, but in two new poets who appeared around this time, Mr. Alberto de Oliveira, who would become perhaps the most typical of our parnasians, and the ill-fated Teófilo Dias. Both the romantic Songs of the former, and the Lira dos verdes anos and Cantos tropicais of the latter are from 1878, and in both, mixed with the general tone of our romantic lyricism, there are clear touches of the new poetics."

Manuel Bandeira, in turn, points out: "The Parnassian aesthetic crystallized among us after the publication of 'Fanfarras', by Teófilo Dias, a book in which the anti-Romantic movement begins to define itself in the spirit and form of the French Parnassians, already sketched in some sonnets by Carvalho Júnior...".

The work "Fanfarras" is really considered the most important of his production, especially for the milestone of literary rupture, as also emphasized by Antônio Cândido: "despite the numerical predominance in his work of verses of romantic inspiration, translations and social poetry, its validity is due, today, to the poems of the first part of Fanfarras, significantly entitled 'Flores Funestas'."

== Works ==
- Flores e Amores (1874)
- Cantos Tropicais (1878)
- Lira dos Verdes Anos (1878)
- Fanfarras (1882)
- A Comédia dos Deuses (1888)

Preceded by New creation	Brazilian Academy of Letters - Patron of the 36th chair	Succeeded by Afonso Celso de Assis Figueiredo Júnior (founder)
