= Indianism (arts) =

Artistic movement in Brazil

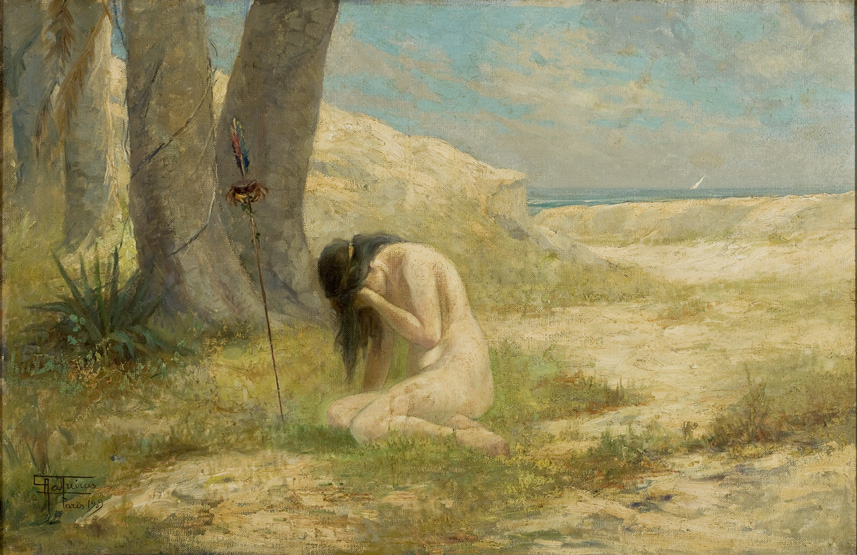
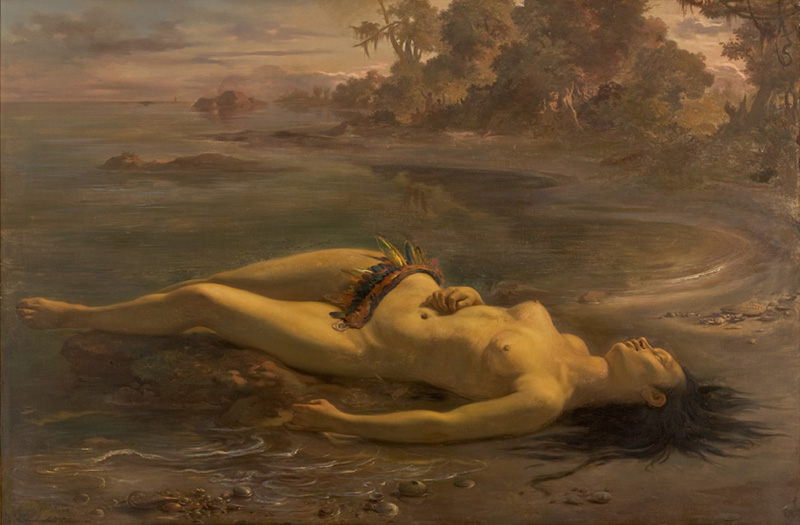
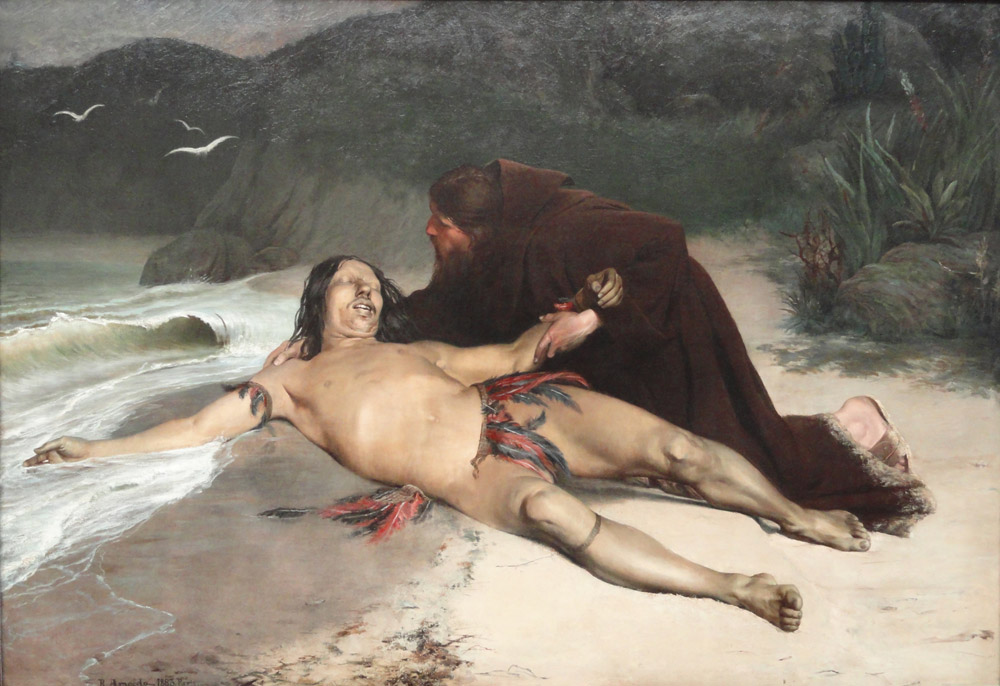
- Iracema by Antônio Parreiras (1909); Moema by Victor Meirelles (1866); The Last Tamoio by Rodolfo Amoedo (1883)

Indianism (Portuguese: Indianismo) was a Brazilian literary and artistic movement that reached its peak during the first stages of Romanticism in the country, though it had been present in Brazilian literature since the Baroque period.

In Romantic contexts, it is called "the first generation of Brazilian Romanticism", being succeeded by the "Ultra-Romanticism" and the "Condorism".

== Historical context ==
After the independence of Brazil from Portugal in 1822, a heavy wave of nationalism spread through the Brazilian people. Inspired by this, poets and writers began to search for an entity that could represent and personify the newly created Brazilian nation.

Since there was no Middle Ages in Brazil, it could not be the knight, as in the European chivalric romances; it could not be the Portuguese man either, since Brazilians still held resentment for the years of colonization; it could not be the black man either, since the mentality of the time did not allow it. Influenced by Enlightenment ideals, especially works by Jean-Jacques Rousseau and the "noble savage" archetype, the authors chose the Brazilian Indian to represent the new nation.

== Characteristics ==
Indianist works are characterized by always having an Indian as the protagonist. The poetry is very patriotic and nationalistic, exalting Brazilian fauna, flora, riches and people.

== Major proponents ==
=== Literature ===
==== Baroque ====
- José de Anchieta (1534–1597)

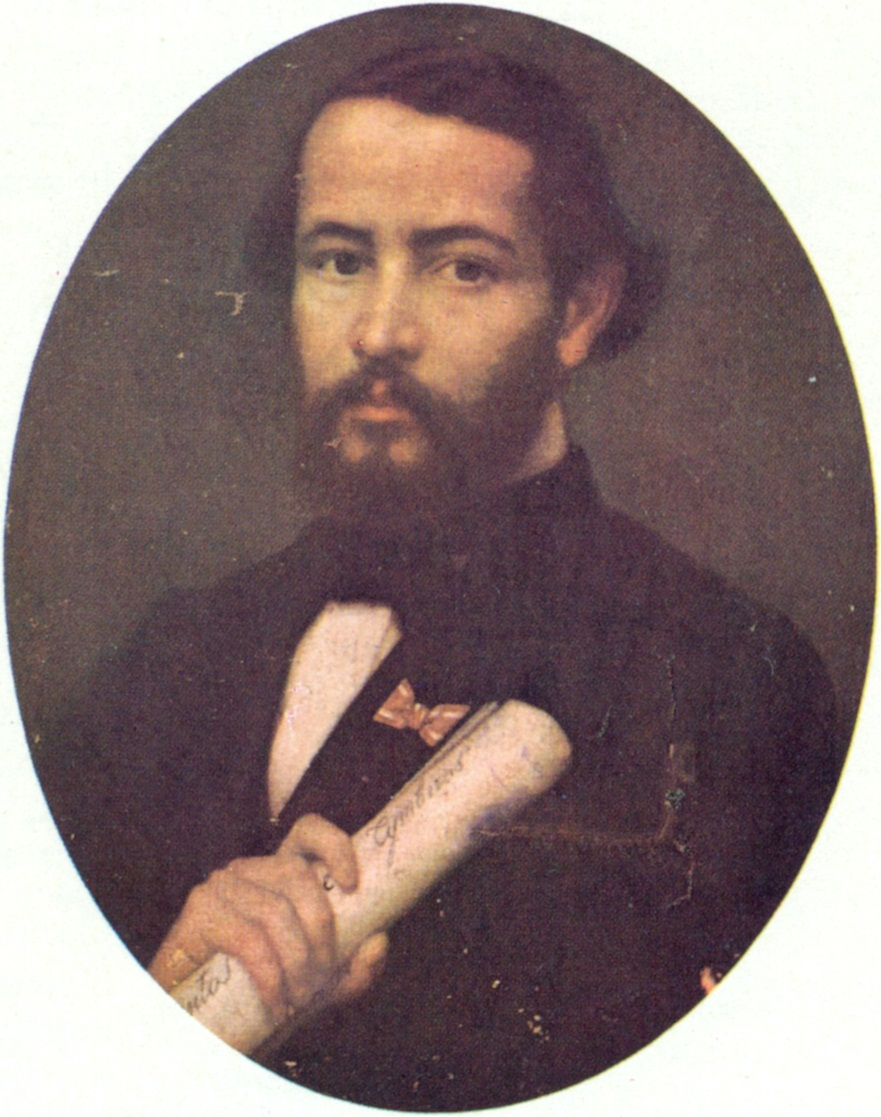
Gonçalves Dias, the most famous Indianist poet

==== Neoclassicism ====
- Basílio da Gama: O Uraguai (1740–1795)
- Santa Rita Durão: Caramuru (1722–1784)

==== Romanticism ====
- José de Alencar: novels O Guarani, Iracema and Ubirajara (1829–1877)
- Gonçalves Dias: narrative poem I-Juca-Pirama, epic poem Os Timbiras, and poetry books Primeiros Cantos, Segundos Cantos and Últimos Cantos (1823–1864)
- Gonçalves de Magalhães: epic poem A Confederação dos Tamoios (1811–1882)

=== Arts ===
- Victor Meirelles (1832–1903)
- Rodolfo Amoedo (1857–1941)
- Antônio Parreiras (1860–1937)

== See also ==
- "Canção do exílio"
- Indigenism
- Brazilian Romantic painting
- Brazilian art
- Brazilian painting

== Bibliography ==
- GRIZOSTE, Weberson Fernandes, A dimensão anti-épica de Virgílio e o Indianismo de Gonçalves Dias, Coimbra, CECH, 2011.
