= Afonso Celso de Assis Figueiredo Júnior =

Brazilian teacher, poet, historian and politician

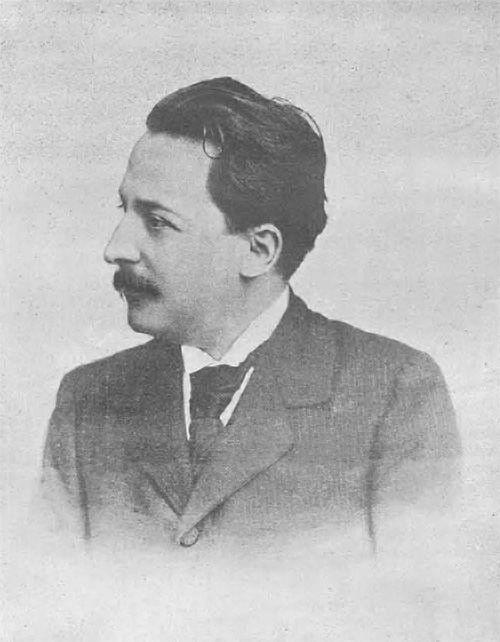
- Count Afonso Celso on the Revista Moderna, c. 1899
- Born: 31 March 1860; Ouro Preto, Empire of Brazil
- Died: 11 July 1938 (aged 78); Rio de Janeiro, Brazil
- Occupations: Professor, poet, politician, historia

Afonso Celso de Assis Figueiredo Júnior, titled Count of Afonso Celso by the Holy See, better known as Afonso Celso, (31 March 1860 – 11 July 1938) was a Brazilian poet, professor, historian, and politician. He was one of the founders of the Brazilian Academy of Letters, where he occupied the chair number 36.

== Biography ==
He was born in Ouro Preto, the son of Afonso Celso, Viscount of Ouro Preto, the last President of the Council of Ministers of the Brazilian Empire, and of Francisca de Paula Martins de Toledo, the daughter of Counselor Joaquim Floriano de Toledo, colonel of the National Guard, who was president of the province of São Paulo six times.

He graduated in law in 1880 from the Faculty of Law of Largo de São Francisco, University of São Paulo, defending the thesis "Law of Revolution."

=== Politics and magisterium ===
He was elected for four consecutive terms of general deputy by Minas Gerais. With the proclamation of the republic, in 1889, left the policy to accompany the father in exile, that followed the departure of the imperial family for Portugal.

Away from politics, he devoted himself to journalism and teaching. He divulged for more than 30 years his articles in Jornal do Brasil and Correio da Manhã. In the magisterium, he held the chair of political economy at the Faculty of Juridical and Social Sciences of Rio de Janeiro.

In 1892, he joined the Brazilian Historic and Geographic Institute. After the death of the Baron of Rio Branco, in 1912, he was elected perpetual president of this institution, a post he held until 1938. He died in Rio de Janeiro.

== Works ==
Of his work the following books deserve to be highlighted:

- Prelúdios - reunindo uma pequena coleção de poesias de conteúdo romântico, publicada quando ele tinha quinze anos de idade (1876)
- Devaneios (1877)
- Telas sonantes (1879)
- Um ponto de interrogação (1879)
- Poenatos (1880)
- Rimas de outrora (1891)
- Vultos e fatos (1892)
- O imperador no exílio (1893)
- Minha filha (1893)
- Lupe (1894)
- Giovanina (1896)
- Guerrilhas (1896)
- Contraditas monárquicas (1896)
- Poesias escolhidas (1898)
- Oito anos de parlamento (1898)
- Trovas de Espanha (1899)
- Aventuras de Manuel João (1899)
- Por que me ufano de meu país (1900) - título que gerou críticas e elogios
- Um invejado (1900)
- Da imitação de Cristo (1903)
- Biografia do Visconde de Ouro Preto (1905)
- Lampejos Sacros (1915)
- O assassinato do coronel Gentil de Castro (1928)
- Segredo conjugal (1932)

== Brazilian Academy of Letters ==
Afonso Celso was one of the thirty men of letters that initially constituted the Brazilian Academy of Letters. Among them were names like Joaquim Nabuco, José do Patrocínio, Machado de Assis, Rui Barbosa and Visconde of Taunay. Ten others were later elected, completing the forty founders of the institute.

He was president of the ABL on two occasions: in 1925 and in 1935.

Preceded by Teófilo Dias (patron)	Brazilian Academy of Letters – Occupant of the 36rd chair 1897–1938	Succeeded by Clementino Fraga
Preceded by Afrânio Peixoto	President of the Brazilian Academy of Letters; 1925	Succeeded by Coelho Neto
Preceded by Ramiz Galvão	President of the Brazilian Academy of Letters; 1935	Succeeded by Laudelino Freire
