= Gonçalves Dias =

Brazilian poet, playwright, ethnographer and linguist (1823–1864)

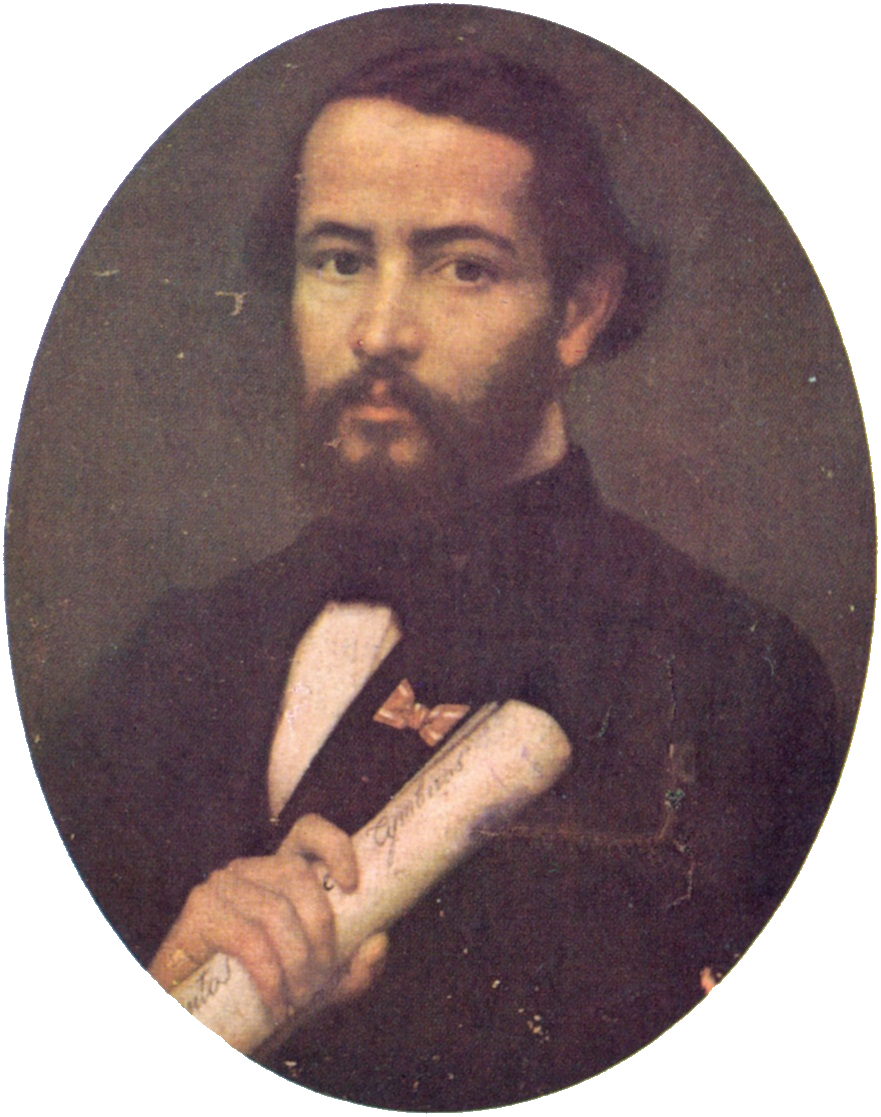
- Born: August 10, 1823; Caxias, Maranhão, Empire of Brazil
- Died: November 3, 1864 (aged 41); Guimarães, Empire of Brazil
- Education: University of Coimbra
- Occupations: Poet, playwright, folklorist, linguist, ethnographer, lawyer
- Spouse: Olímpia Carolina da Costa (m. 1852; div. 1856)
- Children: 1 (stillborn)
- Relatives: João Manuel Gonçalves Dias (father); Vicência Ferreira (mother); Teófilo Dias (nephew)
- Writing career
- Language: Portuguese
- Genres: Poetry, theater play
- Notable works: I-Juca-Pirama; Os Timbiras; Canção do Exílio; Patkull
- Movement: Romanticism

Antônio Gonçalves Dias (Brazilian Portuguese pronunciation: [ɐ̃ˈtoni.u ɡõˈsawviz ˈdʒiɐs, ɐ̃ˈtonju -]; August 10, 1823 – November 3, 1864) was a Brazilian Romantic poet, playwright, ethnographer, lawyer and linguist. A major exponent of Brazilian Romanticism and of the literary tradition known as "Indianism", he is famous for writing "Canção do Exílio" (arguably the most well-known poem of Brazilian literature), the short narrative poem I-Juca-Pirama, the unfinished epic Os Timbiras, and many other nationalist and patriotic poems that would award him posthumously with the title of national poet of Brazil. He was also an avid researcher of Native Brazilian languages and folklore.

He is the patron of the 15th chair of the Brazilian Academy of Letters.

== Biography ==
Manuscript of Dias' poem "Se te amo, não sei!", in his own handwriting. From the archives of the National Library of Brazil

Antônio Gonçalves Dias was born in Caxias on August 10, 1823, to a Portuguese father, João Manuel Gonçalves Dias and a cafuza mother, Vicência Ferreira. After completing his studies in Latin, French and Philosophy, he went in 1838 to Portugal to earn a degree in Law at the University of Coimbra. There he wrote his most remembered poem, "Canção do exílio". He graduated in 1845 and returned to Brazil in the same year. He went to Rio de Janeiro, living there until 1854. There he wrote for newspapers, and began to write the drama Leonor de Mendonça in 1846 and his first poetry book, Primeiros Cantos, in 1847. It was very well-received, and Alexandre Herculano wrote an article praising it. Dias finished his play Leonor de Mendonça also in 1847, and tried to have it performed at the Conservatório de Música do Rio de Janeiro, but the play was not accepted.

In 1848, he wrote two more poetry books: Segundos Cantos and Sextilhas de Frei Antão. In 1849 he became professor of Latin and History at the Colégio Pedro II. In 1851, he published his last poetry book, Últimos Cantos. In the same year, he travelled to Northern Brazil, planning to marry 14-year-old Ana Amélia Ferreira do Vale, to whom he dedicated many of his most famous and beautiful love poems, such as "Seus olhos", "Leviana", "Palinódia" and "Retratação". Ana Amélia was the cousin of Alexandre Teófilo de Carvalho Leal, who in his turn was the brother of Antônio Henriques Leal, a famous Brazilian journalist, writer, medician, biographer and historian known as the "Plutarch of Cantanhede". (Both Alexandre and Antônio were very close friends with Dias, and Antônio would edit Dias' posthumous works in 1875, in 6 volumes.) However, the girl's mother did not allow the marriage, quoting Dias' mestizo origins as a pretext. (This inspired his famous poem "Ainda uma vez – adeus!".) Returning to Rio, he married Olímpia Carolina da Costa later on, having with her a stillborn daughter. Dias divorced Olímpia in 1856.

From 1854 to 1858, he went to Europe on special missions for the Secretary of Foreign Affairs, where he studied the state of public instruction in the educational institutions there. In 1856, in Leipzig, he published his three poetry books in a single volume entitled Cantos, wrote the first four cantos of the epic poem Os Timbiras (that he would leave unfinished) and also published a dictionary of Old Tupi. Returning to Brazil in 1860, he founded the magazine Guanabara alongside Joaquim Manuel de Macedo and Manuel de Araújo Porto-Alegre in 1849, and went on expeditions to Negro and Madeira Rivers, as a member of the Scientific Commission of Exploration. In 1862 he returned to Rio de Janeiro, but shortly after went to Europe again. In October 1863 he went to Lisbon, where he translated Friedrich Schiller's The Bride of Messina and some poems by Heinrich Heine.

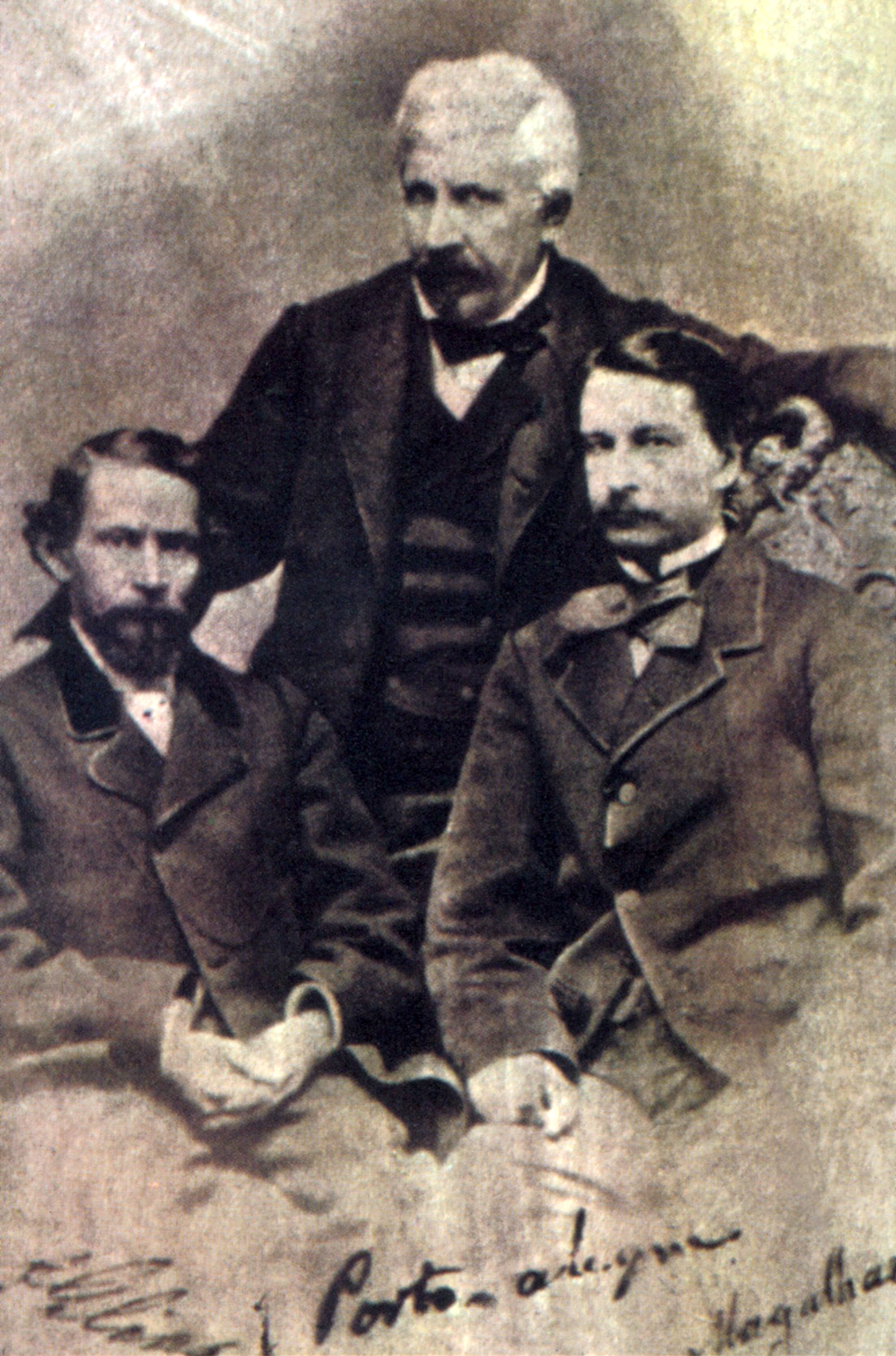
From left to right: Dias, Manuel de Araújo Porto-Alegre and Gonçalves de Magalhães, on a picture dating from circa 1858

After a short stay in France, he decided to return to Brazil in 1864, in the ship Ville de Boulogne. However, the ship was wrecked on the Bay of Cumã, near the shores of Guimarães, Maranhão. All the passengers but Dias survived the tragedy; he was sleeping in his cabin belowdecks and did not wake up in time to see what was happening; thus he drowned.

Dias had a nephew who was also a poet, Teófilo Dias.

== Works ==
=== Poetry ===
- Primeiros Cantos (First Chants — 1847)
- Segundos Cantos (Second Chants — 1848)
- Sextilhas de Frei Antão (Friar Anton's Sextilles — 1848)
- Últimos Cantos (Last Chants — 1851)
- Cantos (Chants — compilation of Primeiros, Segundos and Últimos Cantos, 1856)

=== Theater ===
- Patkull (1843)
- Beatriz Cenci (1845)
- Leonor de Mendonça (1847)
- Boabdil (1850)

=== Epic and narrative poems ===
- I-Juca-Pirama (1851)
- Os Timbiras (The Timbiras — unfinished, 1856)

=== Other ===
- Meditação (Meditation — unfinished, 1850)
- Dicionário da Língua Tupi (Dictionary of Tupi Language — 1856)

== Legacy ==
The city of Gonçalves Dias, founded in 1958, has this name because its territory formerly belonged to the city of Caxias, Dias' hometown. A river in Paraná is named after him, as well as many public squares and streets all over Brazil.

Preceded by New creation	Brazilian Academy of Letters - Patron of the 15th chair	Succeeded by Olavo Bilac (founder)
