= João Simões Lopes Neto =

Brazilian writer

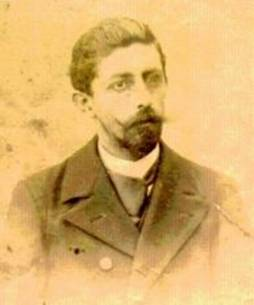
João Simões Lopes Neto.

João Simões Lopes Neto (March 9, 1865 – June 14, 1916) was a Brazilian regionalist writer from Pelotas, Rio Grande do Sul.

After some unsuccessful business ventures, Neto married at 27. He only wrote four significant works, but nevertheless made a strong contribution to Brazilian literature, specifically regionalist writing known as Criollismo in Latin America.

Neto died of a perforated ulcer in 1916 at age 51.
