= Patkull =

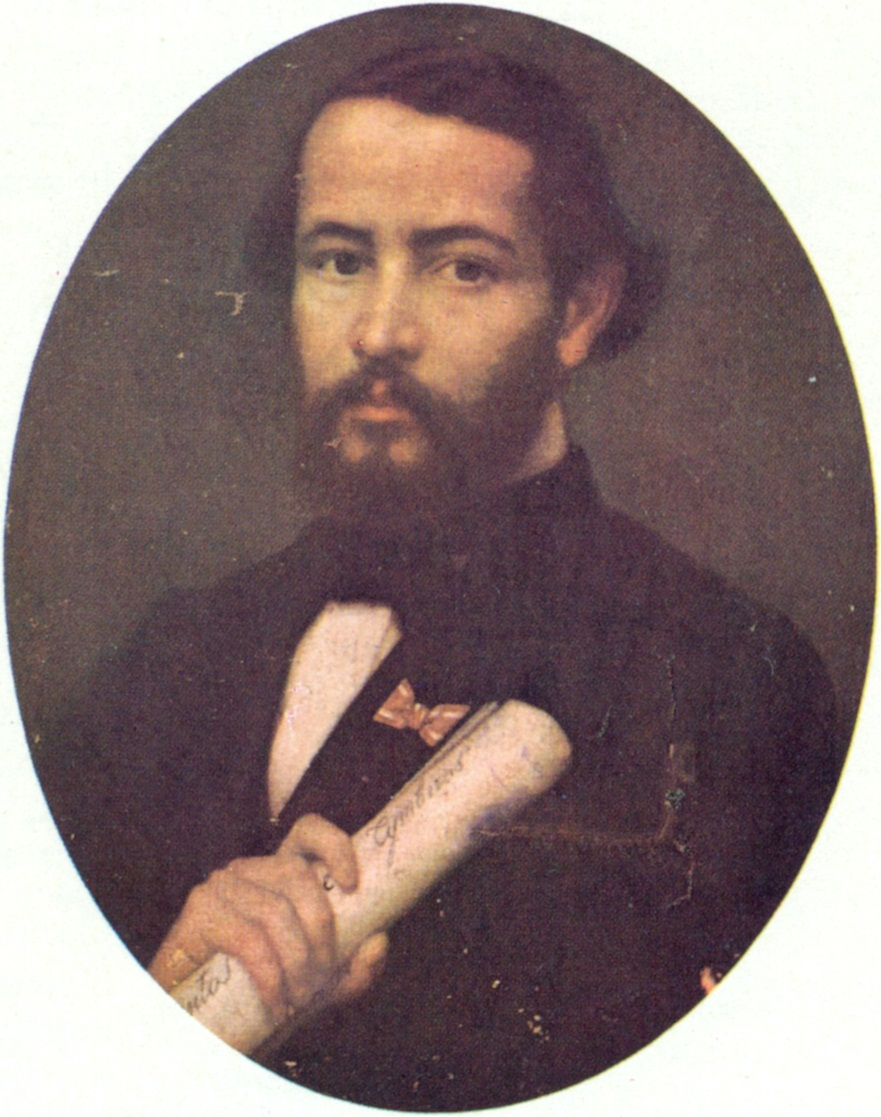
Antônio Gonçalves Dias (August 10, 1823 — November 3, 1864)

Patkull is the first theatre play by Brazilian Romantic author Gonçalves Dias. It was written in 1843, and loosely based on the life of Livonian nobleman and politician Johann Patkul (1660–1707).

== Plot and setting ==
The play is set in the year 1707, and divided in five acts. Initially taking place in the Duchy of Mecklenburg, it later changes its setting to Dresden and even later to the village of Casimir, near Posen. Patkull is a Livonian gentleman who leaves his fiancée Namry Romhor under the care of his friend Paikel, since he must go to war. However, an envious Paikel decides to steal Namry from Patkull, since once Namry and Paikel dated.

Namry remains faithful to Patkull, however Paikel makes Patkull believe Namry is betraying him. And thus the plot gradually develops to Patkull's tragic death.

According to theatre critic Décio de Almeida Prado (1917–2000), Dias could have used Voltaire's 1731 work History of Charles XII as a source of inspiration.

== Characters ==
- Patkull — a Livonian soldier and gentleman.
- Namry Romhor — Patkull's fiancée, who previously dated Patkull's friend Paikel.
- Paikel — Patkull's friend turned enemy, and an alchemist. He decides to seduce Patkull's fiancée while he's out to war.
- Bertha — Paikel's girlfriend.
- Wolf — a page.
