= Alfredo Bosi =

Brazilian literary historian and critic (1936–2021)

- Born: 26 August 1936; São Paulo, Brazil
- Died: 7 April 2021 (aged 84); São Paulo, Brazil
- Occupations: Professor, historian
- Spouse: Ecléa Bosi
- Children: 2
- Awards: Jabuti Prize

Academic background
- Education: University of São Paulo
- Thesis: Itinerario della Narrativa Pirandelliana (1964)

Alfredo Bosi (26 August 1936 – 7 April 2021) was a Brazilian historian, literary critic, and professor. He was a member of the Academia Brasileira de Letras (Brazilian Academy of Letters), occupying Chair number 12. One of his most famous books is História Concisa da Literatura Brasileira (Brief History of Brazilian Literature), widely used in Brazilian universities in literature courses. Bosi also wrote several studies about Italian literature and about major Brazilian writers, as well as essays on the field of hermeneutics.

== Life ==
Alfredo Bosi was born in São Paulo on 26 August 1936. He was married to psychologist Ecléa Bosi, with whom he had two children. His daughter, Viviana Bosi, is also an accomplished literary critic.

Bosi majored in Literature at University of São Paulo in 1960 and later studied in Italy. Following his studies, he took the chair of Italian literature at the same university, an office he held until 1970, when he became professor of Brazilian literature. Bosi occupied the Brazilian Chair of Sociological Sciences Sérgio Buarque de Holanda at the Maison des Sciences de l'Homme and was deputy-director of Institute for Advanced Researches of the University of São Paulo from 1987 to 1997, when he became director of the organization.

Amongst other prizes, he was awarded the Jabuti Prize for best human sciences work in 1993 for Dialética da Colonização (Dialectics of Colonization) and in 2000, for best essay, awarded to his work Machado de Assis. O Enigma do Olhar (Machado de Assis. The Puzzle of the Eye).

Bosi died on 7 April 2021, in São Paulo, of COVID-19. He was 84.

== Selected bibliography ==
- Itinerario della Narrativa Pirandelliana (1964) (Doctoral Thesis)
- O Pré-Modernismo (1966) (Brazilian Pre-Modernism)
- O Ser e o Tempo da Poesia (1977) (The Time and the Being of Poetry)
- Céu, Inferno. Ensaios de Crítica Literária e Ideológica (1988) (Heaven, Hell. Essays of Literary and Ideological Criticism)
- Dialética da Colonização (1992) (Dialectics of Colonization)
- Machado de Assis. O Enigma do Olhar (1999) (Machado de Assis. The Puzzle of the Eye)
- Literatura e Resistência (2002) (Literature and Resistance)
