= I-Juca-Pirama =

1851 poem by Gonçalves Dias

- Author: Gonçalves Dias
- Language: Portuguese
- Genre: Narrative poetry
- Publication date: 1851

I-Juca-Pirama is a short narrative poem by Brazilian author Gonçalves Dias. It first appeared in his 1851 poetry book Últimos Cantos, but is usually published independently of its parent tome. Written under decasyllabic and alexandrine verses, and divided in ten cantos, it is one of the most famous Indianist poems of Brazilian Romanticism.

I-Juca-Pirama means, in Old Tupi, "he who will die".

== Plot ==
The poem tells the story of a Tupi warrior who is captured by an enemy, cannibal tribe – the Timbiras. As he is about to be killed and offered in sacrifice, he begs for mercy in order to be freed and return to his home, where his old, sick and blind father waits for him. The Timbiras then allow the Tupi warrior to go.

The warrior reunites with his father. After smelling the sacrificial paint on his son's body and hearing that he was let go, his father demands they head back to the Timbiras' tribe in order for them to continue the sacrifice ceremony. However, the cacique (chief) of the Timbiras tells the old man that they no longer want the Tupi warrior to be sacrificed, since he begged for mercy and thus is a coward. Angered, the old man curses his son, saying that he is the disgrace of the Tupi tribe. The son cannot stand his father's hate, and suddenly wages war all alone against the whole Timbira tribe. The old man listens to his son's war screams and realizes that he is fighting with honor.

The battle is only finished when the Timbira cacique recognizes the valor of his enemy and says:

Enough, brave warrior! Bravely you fought, and for the sacrifice you must keep your strength.

After hearing this, the old man hugs his son, apologizes for the curses and cries with joy.

This story would be told for generations in the Timbiras' tribe.

== Other medias ==
Play

In 1869, José Bernardino dos Santos published the play Quadros da vida selvagem – Y-Juca Pirama, poesia de A. Gonçalves Dias.

Comic adaptation

In 2012, publisher Peirópolis published a comic adaptation by Laerte Silvino.

== See also ==
- Os Timbiras
- Indianism
