= Pirapemas =

Coordinates: 3°43′S 44°14′W

- Municipality
- Interactive map of Pirapemas
- Country: Brazil
- Region: Nordeste
- State: Maranhão
- Mesoregion: Norte Maranhense

Population (2020)
  - Total: 18,720
- Time zone: UTC−3 (BRT)

Pirapemas is a municipality in the state of Maranhão in the Northeast region of Brazil.

== See also ==
- List of municipalities in Maranhão
