= Canção do Exílio =

Poem by Gonçalves Dias

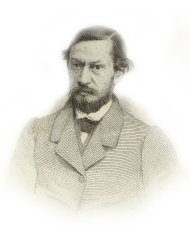
A picture of the poem's author, Antônio Gonçalves Dias

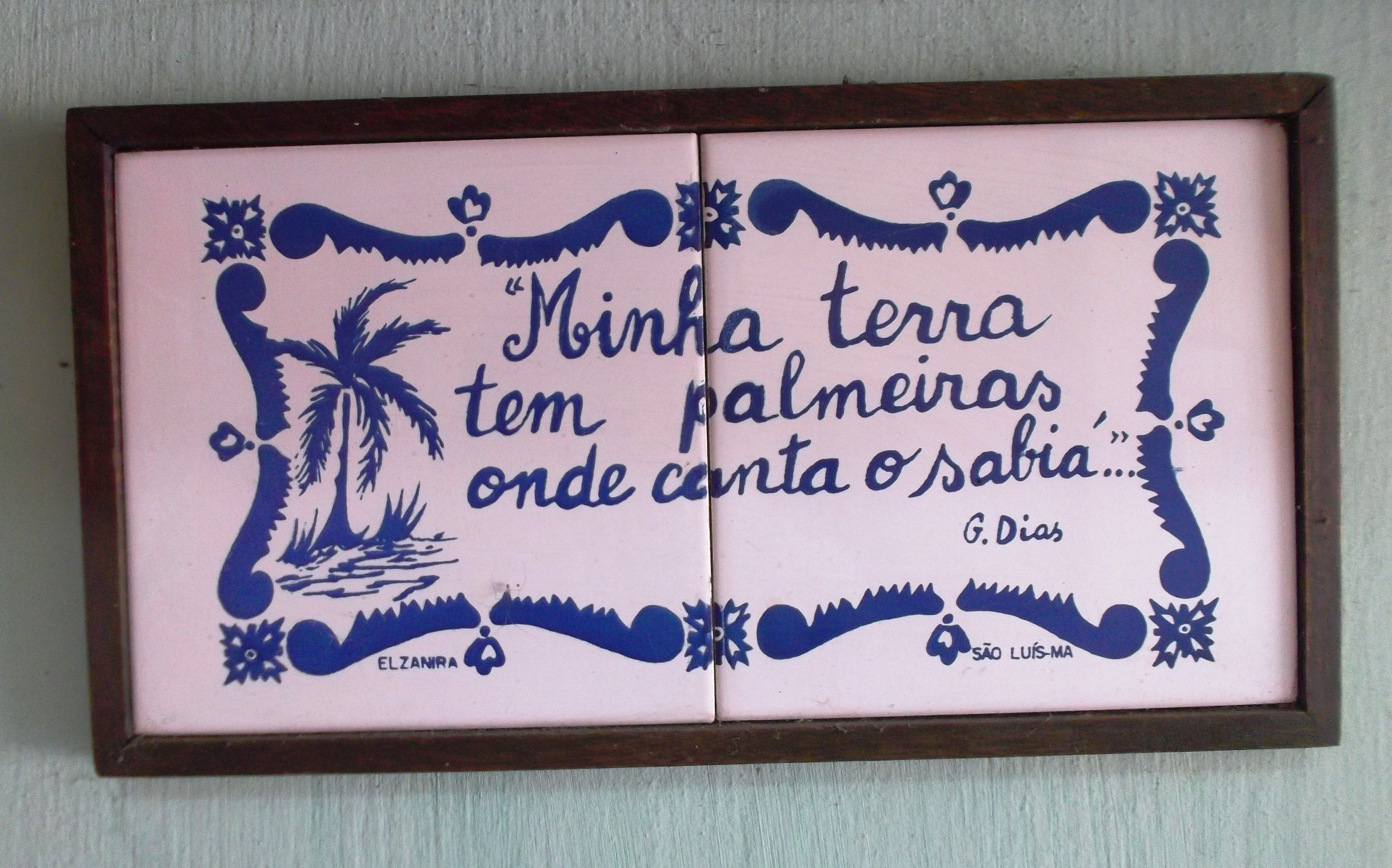
A decorative azulejo featuring the first two verses of the poem

Canção do Exílio (Portuguese pronunciation: [kɐ̃ˈsɐ̃w dweˈzilju], Song of Exile) is a poem written by the Brazilian Romantic author Gonçalves Dias in 1843, when he was in Portugal studying Law at the University of Coimbra. The poem is a famous example of the first phase of Brazilian Romanticism, which was characterized by strong nationalism and patriotism.

The poem first appeared in Dias' book Primeiros Cantos (First Chants), published in 1846. It was influenced by and loosely based on Johann Wolfgang von Goethe's ballad Mignon, and some verses of the ballad are used as the poem's epigraph.

Canção do Exílio is one of the most famous poems of Brazilian literature, being referenced and/or parodied by many other Brazilian authors. The lines "Nossos bosques têm mais vida,/Nossa vida mais amores" were later included in the national anthem of Brazil as a tribute to Dias.

== The poem ==
The poem begins with the following excerpt of Johann Wolfgang von Goethe's ballad Mignon as epigraph:

"Kennst du das Land, wo die Zitronen blühen,
Im dunkeln Laub die Gold-Orangen glühen,
Kennst du es wohl? – Dahin, dahin!
Möcht' ich... ziehn."

Freely translated into English as:

"Do you know the land where the lemon trees bloom,
And the golden oranges glitter in the dark foliage,
Do you know it? – There, there!
I would like to... go."

Original Portuguese

Minha terra tem palmeiras
Onde canta o sabiá.
As aves que aqui gorjeiam
Não gorjeiam como lá.

Nosso céu tem mais estrelas,
Nossas várzeas têm mais flores.
Nossos bosques têm mais vida,
Nossa vida mais amores.

Em cismar, sozinho, à noite,
Mais prazer encontro eu lá.
Minha terra tem palmeiras
Onde canta o sabiá.

Minha terra tem primores
Que tais não encontro eu cá;
Em cismar – sozinho, à noite –
Mais prazer encontro eu lá.
Minha terra tem palmeiras
Onde canta o sabiá.

Não permita Deus que eu morra
Sem que eu volte para lá;
Sem que desfrute os primores
Que não encontro por cá;
Sem que ainda aviste as palmeiras
Onde canta o sabiá.

Literal English translation

My land has palm trees
Where the thrush sings.
The birds that sing here
Do not sing as they do there.

Our skies have more stars,
Our valleys have more flowers.
Our forests have more life,
Our lives have more love.

In dreaming, alone, at night,
I find more pleasure there.
My land has palm trees
Where the thrush sings.

My land has beauties
That cannot be found here;
In dreaming – alone, at night –
I find more pleasure there.
My land has palm trees
Where the thrush sings.

May God never allow
That I die before I return;
Without seeing the beauties
That I cannot find here;
Without seeing the palm trees
Where the thrush sings.

== Well-known parodies, references and citations ==
The following is a list of the most famous parodies, reimaginings and citations of the poem, by other Brazilian authors.

- "Eu nasci além dos mares" and "Se eu tenho de morrer na flor dos anos" — Casimiro de Abreu
- "Canto de regresso à pátria" — Oswald de Andrade
- "Europa, França e Bahia" — Carlos Drummond de Andrade
- "Nova canção do exílio" — Carlos Drummond de Andrade
- "Canção do exílio" — Murilo Mendes
- "Canção do expedicionário" — Guilherme de Almeida
- "Uma canção" — Mário Quintana
- "Jogos florais I" and "II" — Cacaso
- "Canção do exílio facilitada — José Paulo Paes
- "Lisboa: Aventuras" — José Paulo Paes
- "Sabiá" — song by Chico Buarque and Tom Jobim
- "Terra das Palmeiras" — Taiguara
- "Terra minha" — Vinicius de Moraes
- "Marginália II" — Gilberto Gil
- "Canção do Exílio às Avessas" — Jô Soares
