= Gonçalves Dias, Maranhão =

Coordinates: 5.15083°S 44.2989°W

Gonçalves Dias
- Municipality
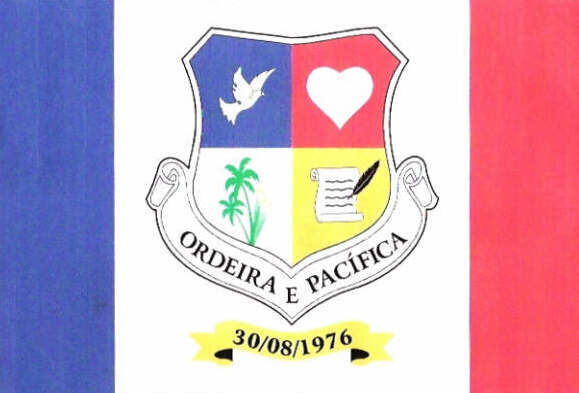
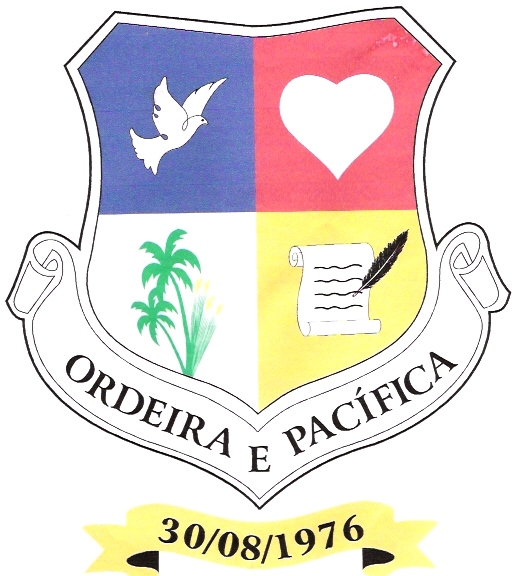
- Flag Coat of arms
- Interactive map of Gonçalves Dias
- Country: Brazil
- Region: Nordeste
- State: Maranhão
- Mesoregion: Centro Maranhense

Population (2020)
  - Total: 17,944
- Time zone: UTC−3 (BRT)

Gonçalves Dias is a municipality in the state of Maranhão in the Northeast region of Brazil.

== See also ==
- List of municipalities in Maranhão
