= Brazilian literature =

Literary genre

Brazilian literature is the literature written in the Portuguese language by Brazilians or in Brazil, including works written prior to the country's independence in 1822. Throughout its early years, literature from Brazil followed the literary trends of Portugal, gradually shifting to a different and authentic writing style in the course of the 19th and 20th centuries, in the search for truly Brazilian themes and use of Brazilian forms.

Timeline (in Portuguese) of Brazilian literature

Portuguese is a Romance language and the sole official language of Brazil. Lyrically, the poet Olavo Bilac, named it " (...) desconhecida e obscura./ Tuba de alto clangor, lira singela,/ Que tens o trom e o silvo da procela,/ E o arrolo da saudade e da ternura! ", which roughly translates as "(...) unknown and obscure,/ Tuba of high blare, delicate lyre,/ That holds the frill and the hiss of the tempest/ And the singing of longing and of tenderness!"

Brazil's most significant literary award is the Camões Prize, which it shares with the rest of the Portuguese-speaking world. As of 2016, Brazil has eleven recipients of the prize. Brazil also holds its own literary academy, the Brazilian Academy of Letters, a non-profit cultural organization dedicated to preserving and advancing the national language and literature.

Brazilian literature has been very prolific. Having as birth the letter of Pero Vaz de Caminha, the document that marks the discovery of Brazil, the country's literature has encompassed several significant writers. Major figures include novelists Machado de Assis, Guimarães Rosa, Jorge Amado, Clarice Lispector and Graciliano Ramos; poets such as João Cabral de Melo Neto, Mário de Andrade, Carlos Drummond de Andrade, Vinicius de Moraes, Ferreira Gullar and Manuel Bandeira; dramatists like Nelson Rodrigues and Augusto Boal, and literary critics and theorists such as Antonio Candido and Otto Maria Carpeaux, among others.

== Colonial period ==
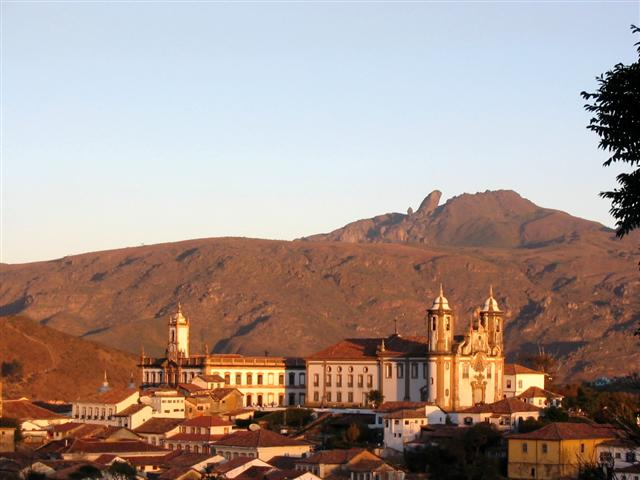
Colonial Brazil.

One of the first extant documents that might be considered Brazilian literature is the Carta de Pero Vaz de Caminha (Pero Vaz de Caminha's letter). It is written by Pero Vaz de Caminha to Manuel I of Portugal, which contains a description of what Brazil looked like in 1500. Journals of voyagers and descriptive treatises on "Portuguese America" dominated the literary production for the next two centuries, including well-known accounts by Jean de Léry and Hans Staden, whose story of his encounter with the Tupi Indians on the coast of São Paulo was extraordinarily influential for European conceptions of the New World.

A few more explicitly literary examples survive from this period, such as Basílio da Gama's epic poem celebrating the conquest of the Guarany Missions by the Portuguese, and the work of Gregório de Matos, a 17th-century lawyer from Salvador who produced a sizable amount of satirical, religious, and secular poetry. Matos drew heavily from Baroque influences such as the Spanish poets Luis de Góngora and Francisco de Quevedo.

Neoclassicism was widespread in Brazil during the mid-18th century, following the Italian style. Literature was often produced by members of temporary or semi-permanent academies and most of the content was in the pastoral genre. The most important literary centre in colonial Brazil was the prosperous Minas Gerais region, known for its gold mines, where a thriving proto-nationalist movement had begun. The most important poets were Cláudio Manuel da Costa, Tomás António Gonzaga, Alvarenga Peixoto and Manuel Inácio da Silva Alvarenga, all of them involved in an uprising against the colonial power. Gonzaga and Costa were exiled to Africa as a consequence.

== Romanticism ==
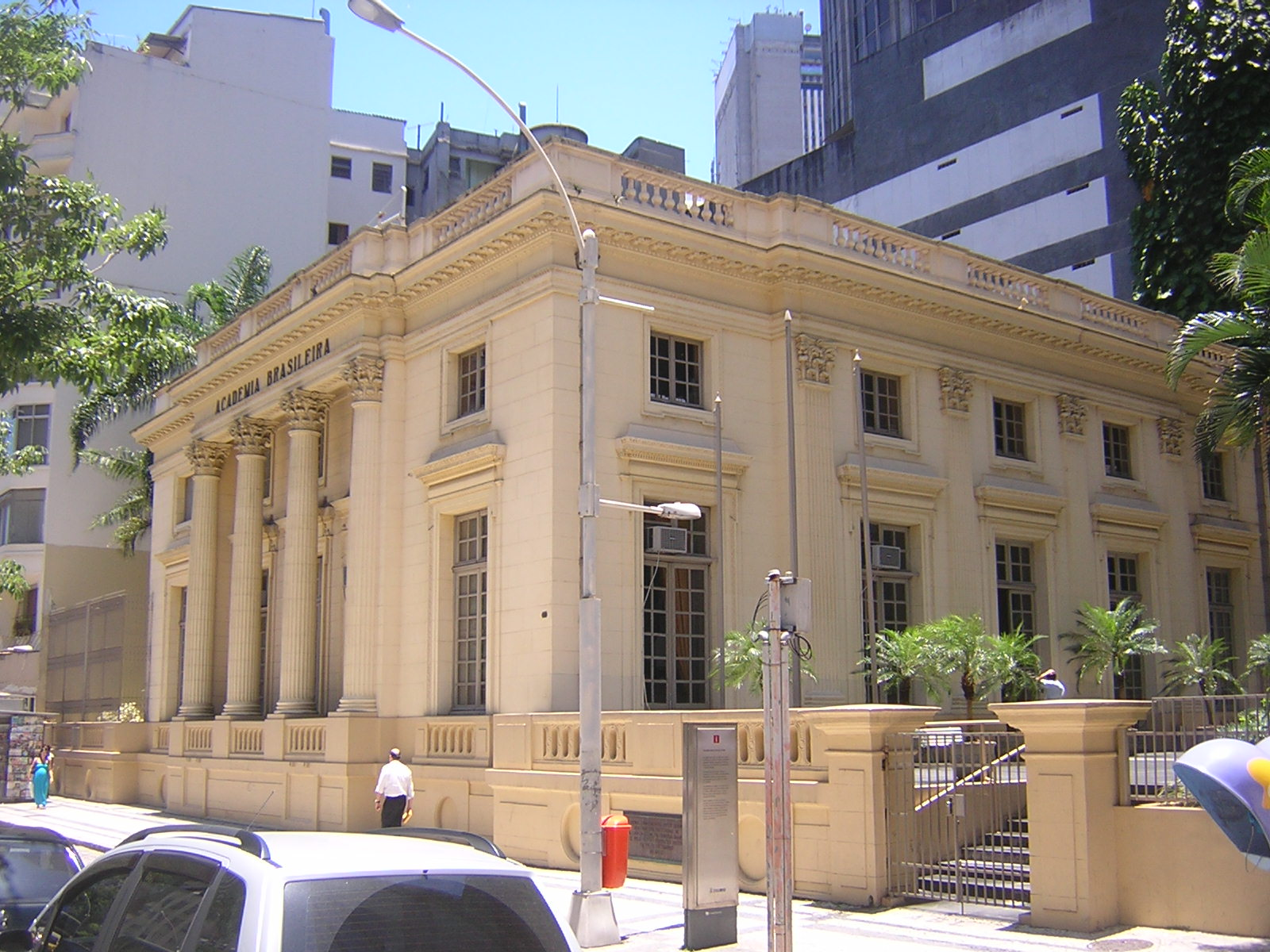
Academia Brasileira de Letras, Rio de Janeiro, Brazil.

Inauguration of the writer Rachel de Queiroz at the Brazilian Academy of Letters.

Neoclassicism lasted for an unnaturally long time, stifling innovation and restricting literary creation. It was only in 1836 that Romanticism began influencing Brazilian poetry on a large scale, principally through the efforts of the expatriate poet Gonçalves de Magalhães. A number of young poets, such as Casimiro de Abreu, began experimenting with the new style soon afterward. This period produced some of the first standard works of Brazilian literature.

The key features of the literature of the newborn country are exaggerated affect, nationalism, celebration of nature and the initial introduction of colloquial language. Romantic literature soon became very popular. Novelists like Joaquim Manuel de Macedo, Manuel Antônio de Almeida and José de Alencar published their works in serial form in the newspapers and became national celebrities.

Around 1850, a transition began, centered on Álvares de Azevedo. Azevedo's short story collection Noite na Taverna (English: A Night at the Tavern) and his poetry, collected posthumously in Lira dos Vinte Anos (English: Twenty-year-old Lyre), became influential. Azevedo was largely influenced by the poetry of Lord Byron and Alfred de Musset. This second Romantic generation was obsessed with morbidity and death.

At the same time, poets such as Castro Alves, who wrote of the horrors of slavery (Navio Negreiro), began writing works with a specific progressive social agenda. The two trends coincided in one of the most important accomplishments of the Romantic era: the establishment of a Brazilian national identity based on Indian ancestry and the rich nature of the country. These traits first appeared in Gonçalves Dias' narrative poem I-Juca-Pirama, but soon became widespread. The consolidation of this subgenre (Indianism) is found in two famous novels by José de Alencar: The Guarani, about a family of Portuguese colonists who took Indians as servants but were later slain by an enemy tribe, and Iracema, about a Portuguese shipwrecked man who lives among the Indians and marries a beautiful Indian woman. Iracema is especially lyrical, opening with five paragraphs of pure free-style prose poetry describing the title character.

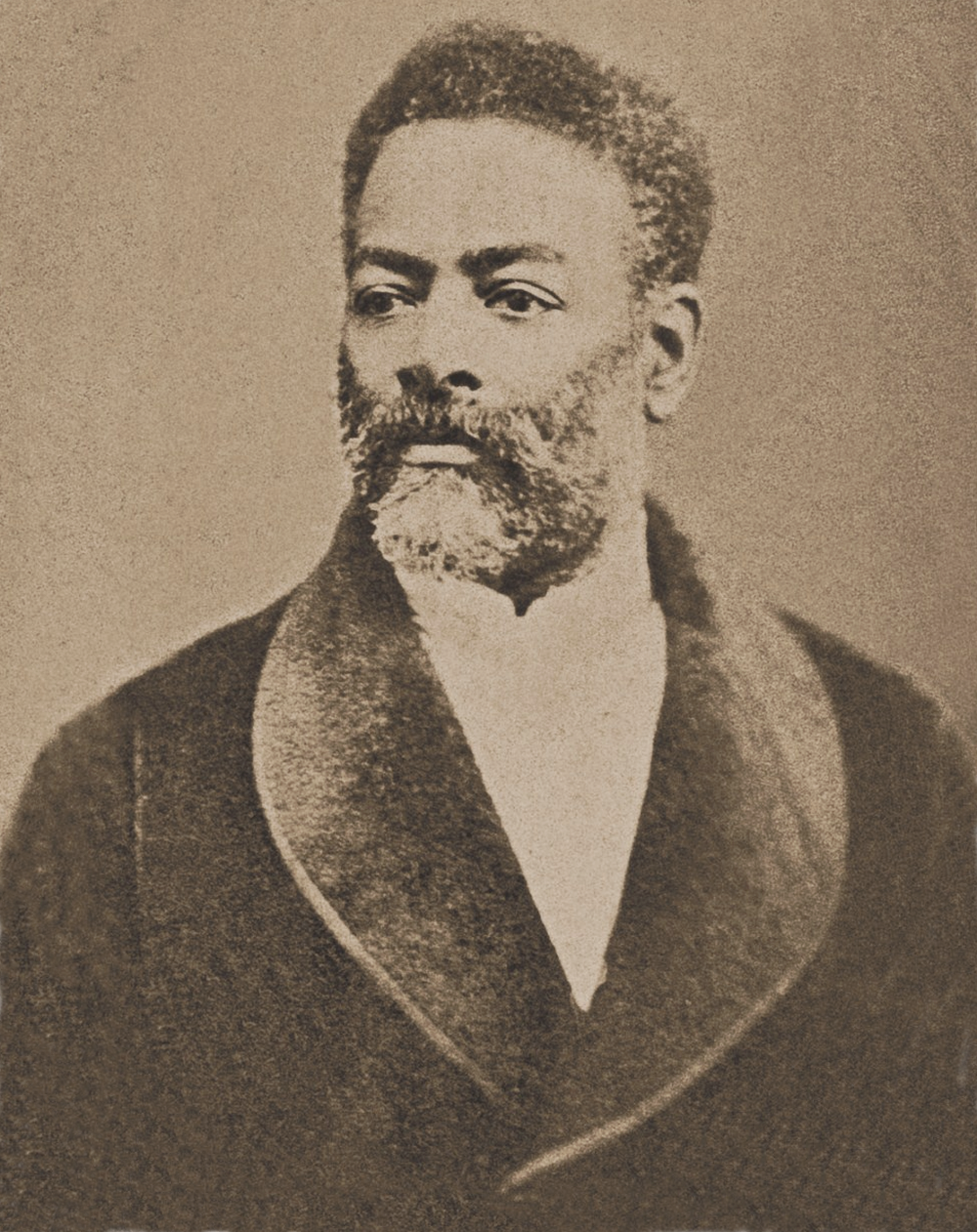
Luís Gama

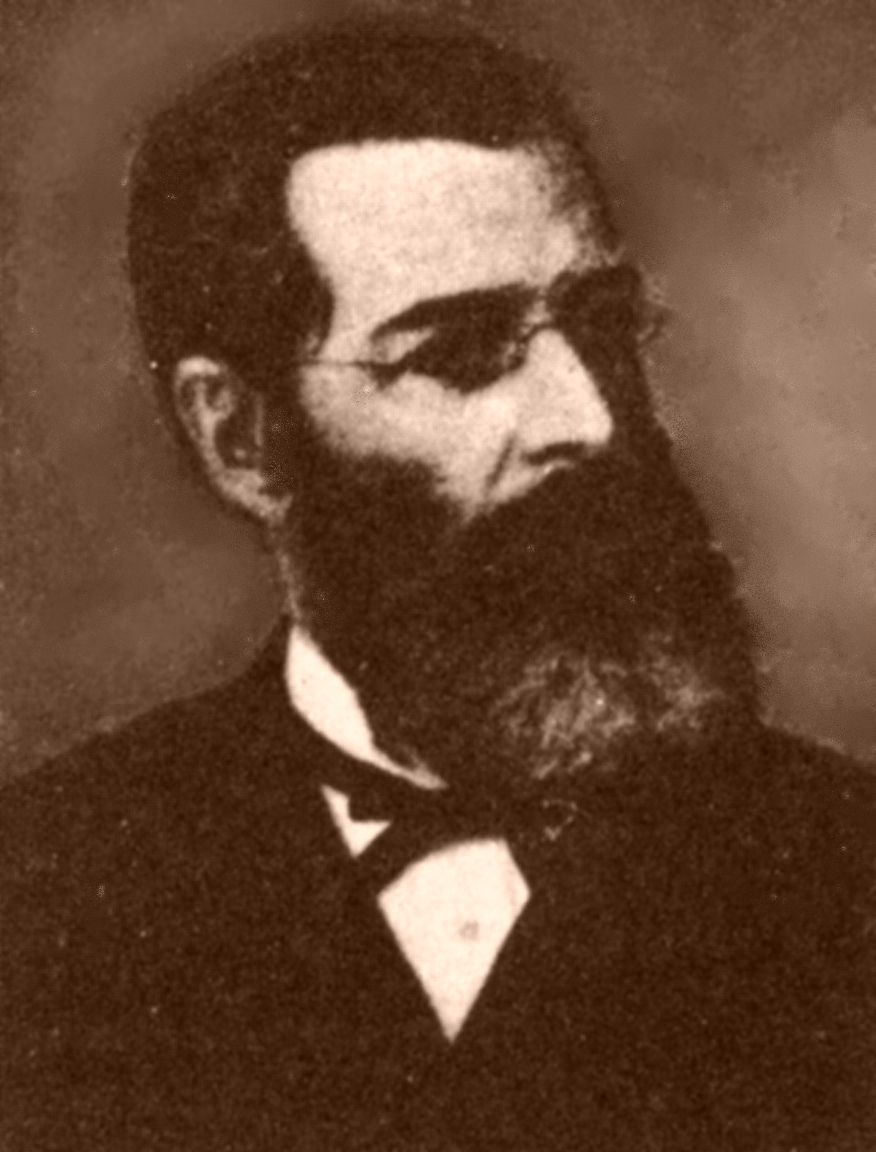
José de Alencar

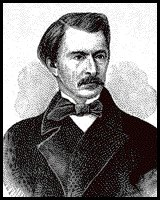
Gonçalves de Magalhães, Viscount of Araguaia

== Realism ==
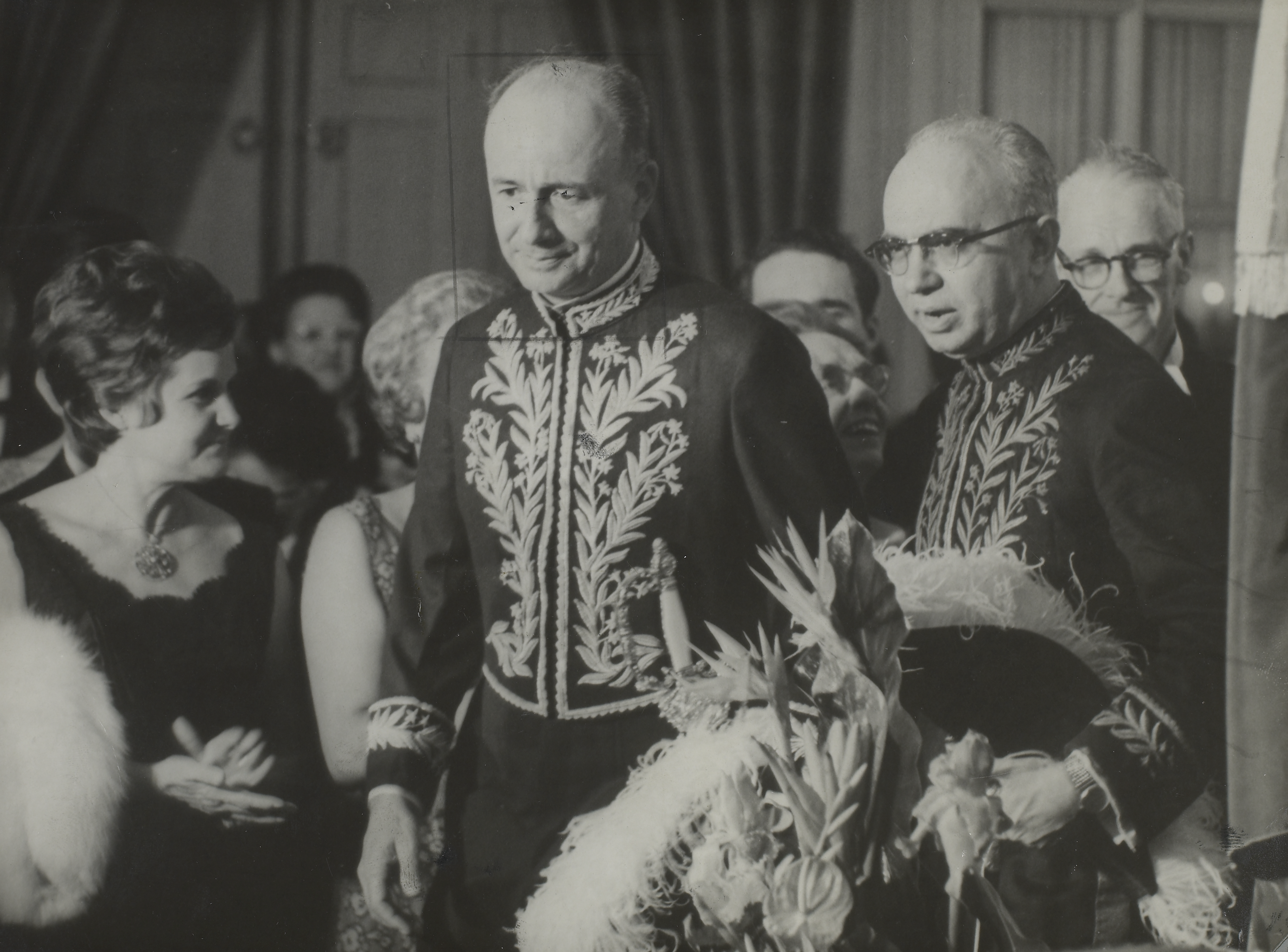
Inauguration of Adonias Filho at the Brazilian Academy of Letters.

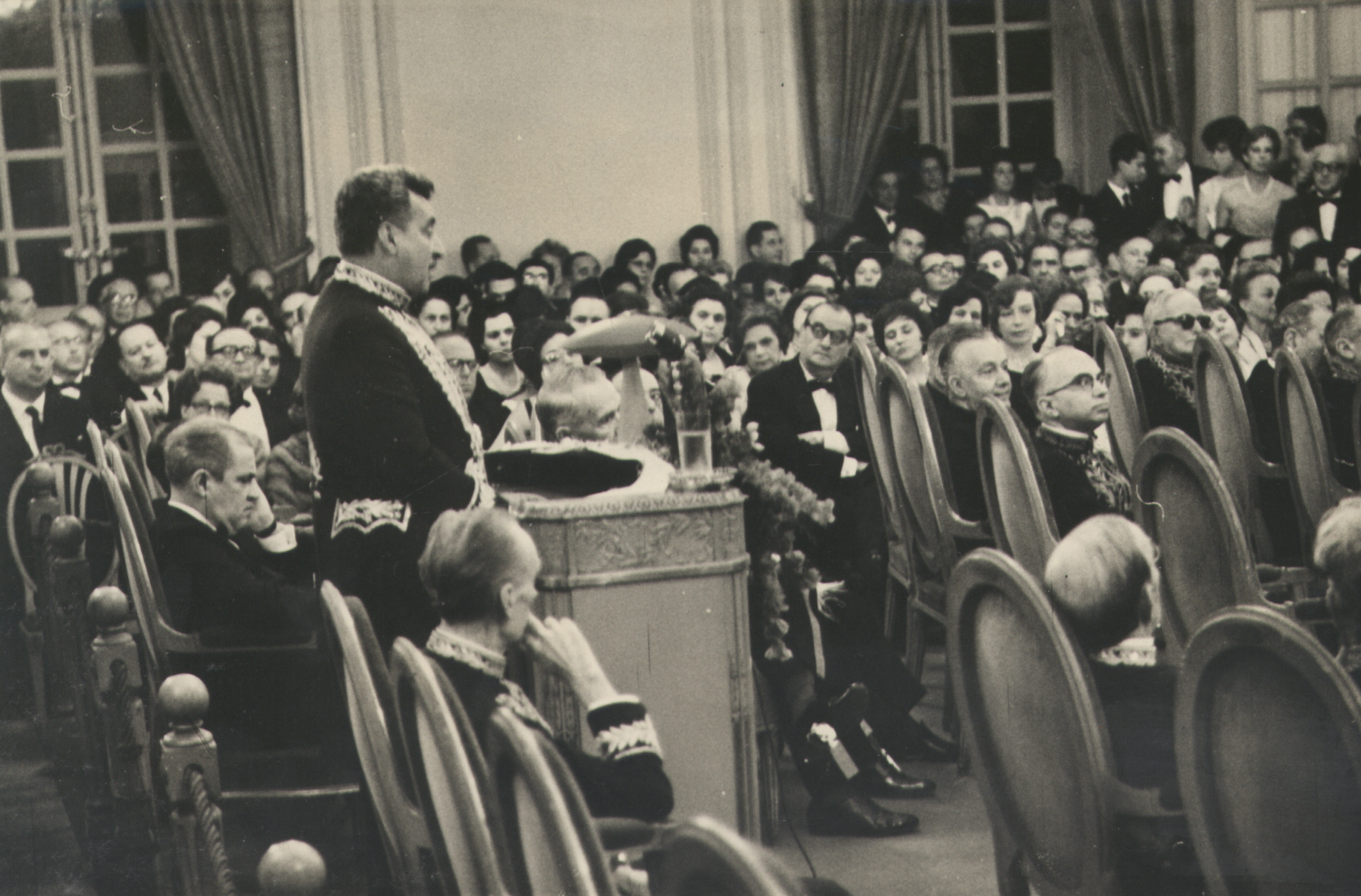
Inauguration of Jorge Amado at the Brazilian Academy of Letters.

Inauguration of Aníbal Freire da Fonseca at the Brazilian Academy of Letters.

The decline of Romanticism, along with a series of social transformations, occurred in the middle of the 19th century. A new form of prose writing emerged, including analysis of the indigenous people and description of the environment, in the regionalist authors (such as Franklin Távora and João Simões Lopes Neto). Under the influence of Naturalism and of writers like Émile Zola, Aluísio Azevedo wrote O Cortiço, with characters that represent all social classes and categories of the time. Brazilian Realism was not very original at first, but it took on extraordinary importance because of Machado de Assis and Euclides da Cunha.

=== Machado de Assis ===
Usually appointed as the greatest Brazilian writer of all times, Joaquim Maria Machado de Assis (1839–1908) is also the most important writer of Brazilian Realism. Born in Rio de Janeiro City (by the time, imperial capital of Brazil), he was the natural son of a half-black wallpainter and a Portuguese woman, whose only education, besides literacy classes, was the extensive reading of borrowed books.

Working as typesetter at a publishing house, he was soon acquainted with most of the world's literature and became fluent in English and French. In his early career he wrote several best-selling novels (including A Mão e a Luva and Ressurreição) which, despite their overzealous Romanticism, already show his vivacious humour and some of his pessimism towards the conventions of society.

After being introduced to Realism, Machado de Assis changed his style and his themes, producing some of the most remarkable prose ever written in Portuguese. The style served as the medium for his corrosive humour and his intense pessimism, which was very far from the plain conceptions of his contemporaries.

Machado's most crucial works include:

- Memórias Póstumas de Brás Cubas (The Posthumous Memoirs of Brás Cubas), the fictional autobiography of a recently deceased man, written by himself "from beyond". It is entirely anti-Romantic and ridicules the society of Rio de Janeiro of the time. This book contains one of the most pitiless sentences about love ever written: "Marcela amou-me durante quinze meses e onze contos de réis; nada menos". (Marcela loved me for fifteen months and eleven thousand réis; nothing less.)
- Dom Casmurro purports to be the autobiography of a lonely man who has left his wife and his only son after enjoying years of happy conjugal life. The novel is famous in the Portuguese-speaking world for its analysis of a (possible, but never proven or admitted) case of adultery.
- Quincas Borba
- O Alienista, the short story about a psychiatrist who founds a hospital for the mentally ill in a small town and later engages in profound investigations on the nature and the cure of mental illness, greatly upsetting the town's lifestyle.

Machado was also a minor poet, writing mostly casual poetry of extraordinary correctness and beauty. His reputation as a novelist has kept his poetry in print, and recent criticism has regarded it better than that of many of his contemporaries.

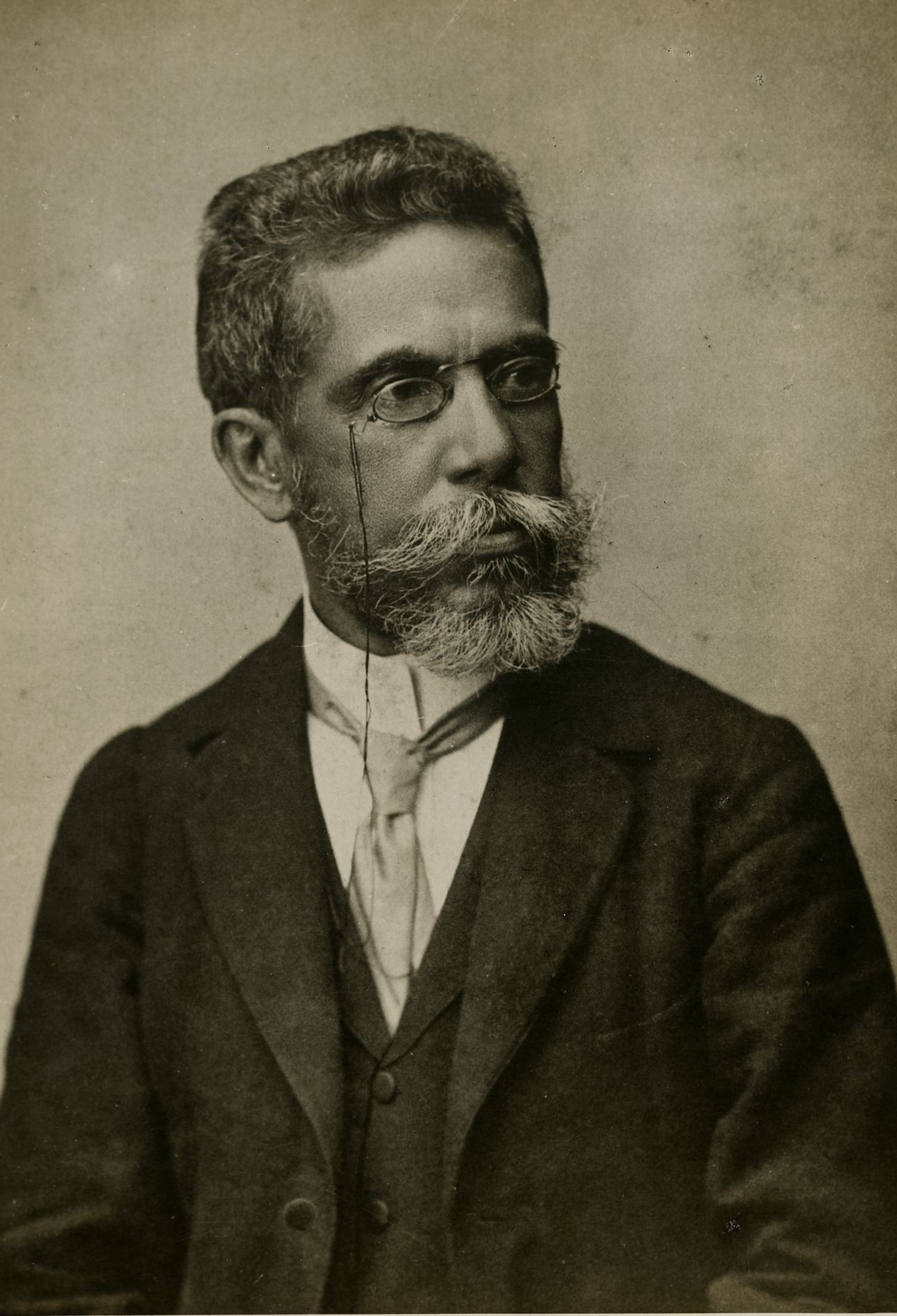
Machado de Assis

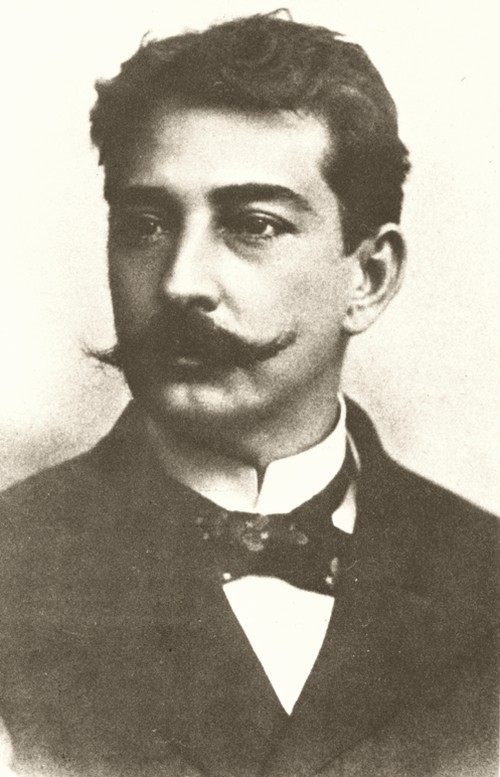
Aluísio Azevedo

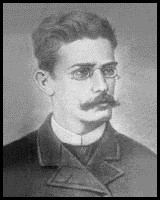
Raul Pompeia

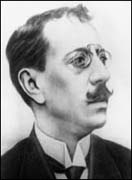
Olavo Bilac

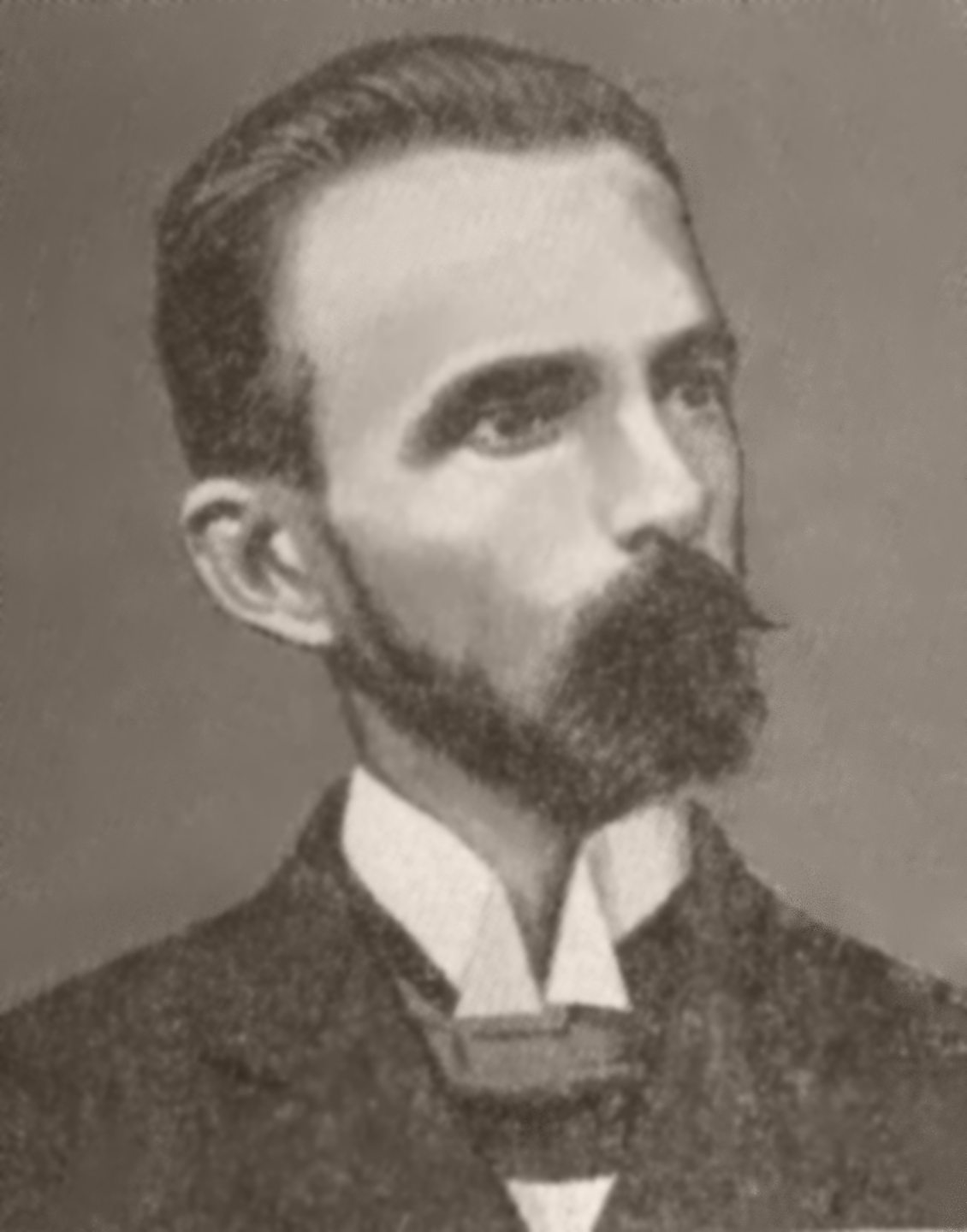
Raimundo Correia

== Pre-Modernism ==
The period between 1895 and 1922 is called Pre-Modernism by Brazilian scholars because, though there is no clear predominance of any style, there are some early manifestations of Modernism. The Pre-Modern era is curious, as the French school of Symbolism did not catch on and most authors of Realism still maintained their earlier styles and their reputations (including Machado de Assis and poet Olavo Bilac). Some authors of this time were Monteiro Lobato, Lima Barreto, Simões Lopes Neto and Augusto dos Anjos.

=== Euclides da Cunha ===
A writer highly influenced by determinism, Cunha was always tormented by his family problems (he was killed by his wife's lover) and had to face political opposition because of his opinions. As a freelance journalist working for O Estado de S. Paulo he covered the Canudos War—a popular revolt with some egalitarian and Christian-fundamentalist traits that took place in Bahia in 1895-97. His stories, together with some essays he wrote about the people and the geography of the Brazilian Northeast, were published in a thick volume called Os Sertões (Rebellion in the Backlands).

In his work, Cunha put forward the revolutionary thesis that the Brazilian state was a violent and foreign entity, rejected (but often tolerated) by the vast majority of the illiterate and dispossessed population, some of whom preserved beliefs and behaviours that had not changed in a thousand years or more. He discovered, for instance, that Sebastianism was then present in the Brazilian North-East and that many medieval Portuguese rhymes, folk-tales and traditions were still kept by the coarse people of the "sertões". This population did not accept secularism, the Republican government and, especially, justice or peace.

His trilogy Os Sertões is composed of three parts titled "The Land", "The Man" and "The fight". Such organization of the book reinforces the idea that the environment where a man was born, the social aspects of his residence and the man's culture may define what he will become. This principle is known as determinism, a way of thought that deeply influenced Brazilian literature during the mid- and late 19th century and the early 20th century.

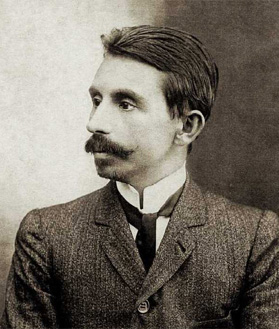
Euclides da Cunha

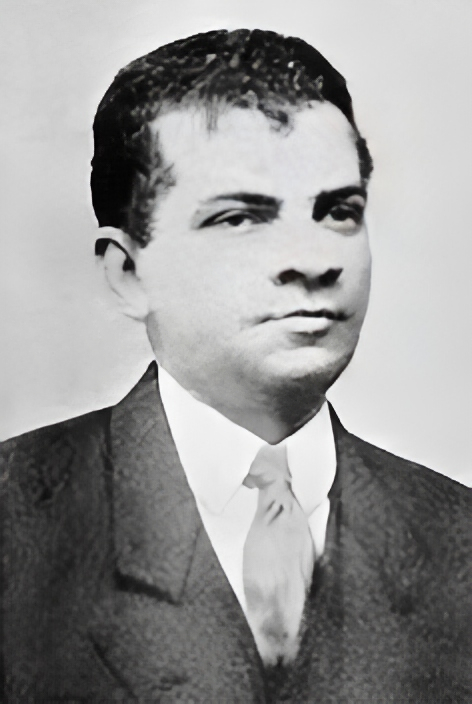
Lima Barreto

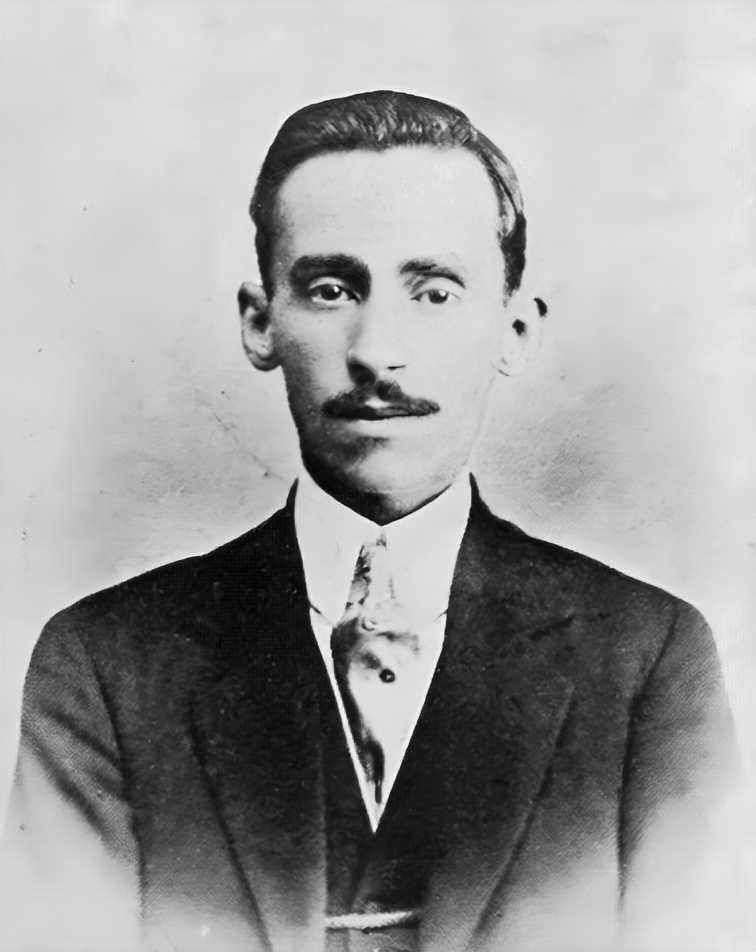
Augusto dos Anjos

== Modernism ==
Modernism began in Brazil with the Week of Modern Art, in 1922. The 1922 Generation was a nickname for the writers Mário de Andrade (Paulicéia Desvairada, Macunaíma), Oswald de Andrade (Memórias Sentimentais de João Miramar), Manuel Bandeira, Cassiano Ricardo and others, all of whom combined nationalist tendencies with interest in European modernism. Some new movements such as surrealism were already important in Europe, and began to take hold in Brazil during this period.

=== Mário de Andrade ===
Mário de Andrade was born in São Paulo. He worked as a professor and was one of the organizers of the Week of Modern Art. He researched Brazilian folklore and folk music and used it in his books, avoiding the European style. His Brazilian anti-hero is Macunaíma, a product of ethnical and cultural mixture. Andrade's interest in folklore and his use of colloquial language were extremely influential.

=== Oswald de Andrade ===
Oswald de Andrade, another participant in the Week of Modern Art in 1922, worked as a journalist in São Paulo. Born into a wealthy family, he travelled to Europe several times. Of the 1922 generation, Oswald de Andrade best represents the rebellious characteristics of the modernist movement. He is the author of the Manifesto Antropófago (Cannibal Manifesto) (1927), in which he says it is necessary that Brazil, like a cannibal, eat foreign culture and, in digestion, create its own culture.

=== 30s generation ===
After the modernist critique there was a generation of writers which actually "regressed" in terms of "modernist" ideas of experimentation, and which instead focused on social criticism. In literary criticism however they are mostly regarded as a development within modernism and grouped within the term "Geração de 30"(30s generation).

Jorge Amado, one of best-known of modern Brazilian writers, tried with his novels to approximate his works to a proletarian literature, he himself was a member of the communist party which defended Socialist realism at the time.

Rachel de Queiroz, and José Lins do Rego were other important writers of this generation.

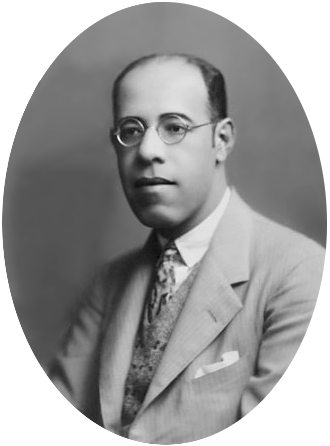
Mario de Andrade

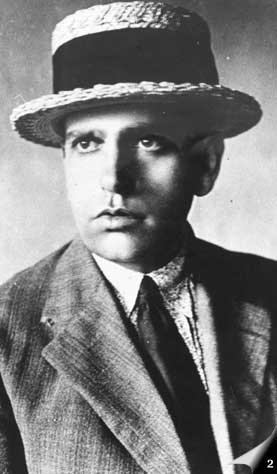
Oswald de Andrade

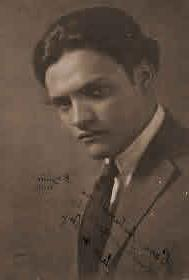
José Lins do Rego

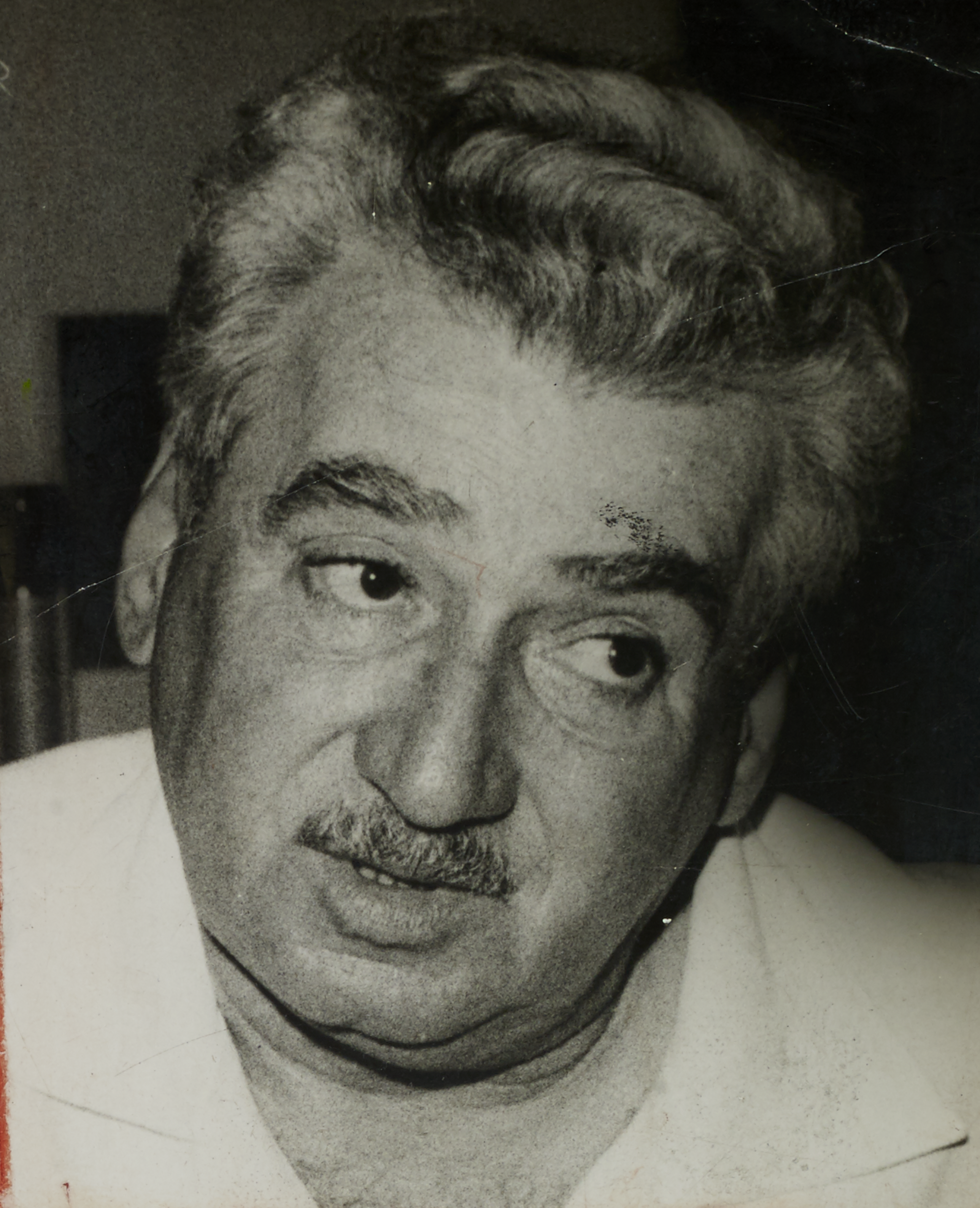
Jorge Amado

== Post-Modernism ==
What defined Brazilian modernism were two main traits: experiments in language and an enhanced social consciousness, or a mix between the two - as was the case with Oswald de Andrade, who was briefly attracted towards the communist movement. The reaction to modernism, then, assumed the form of a mix between its most salient trait, the use of more formal literary language (as was the case of the so-called "generation of 1945", whose twin hallmarks were, firstly, the highly physical poetry of João Cabral de Melo Neto, who opposed Carlos Drummond de Andrade's poetic modernism, and secondly the sonnets - on both the Italian and English model - of the early Vinicius de Moraes), followed by varying doses, according to the author considered, of subjectivism, political conservatism and militant Catholicism.

Two writers from that "school" that were published after the 1950s are without a doubt already inside the canon of Brazilian literature: Clarice Lispector, whose existentialist novels and short stories are filled with stream-of-consciousness and epiphanies, and João Guimarães Rosa, whose experimental language has changed the face of Brazilian literature forever. His novel Grande Sertão: Veredas has been compared to James Joyce's Ulysses or Alfred Döblin's Berlin Alexanderplatz and featured in the Bokklubben World Library list of 100 best novels of all time. João Guimarães Rosa is considered by many to be the greatest Brazilian writer.

Following the wake of conservative subjectivism inaugurated by the militantly Catholic novelists-cum-polemicists Otavio de Faria, Lúcio Cardoso, Cornélio Penna and Gustavo Corção, Nelson Rodrigues made his career as a playwright and sports journalist. His plays and short stories - the latter mostly originally published as newspaper feuilletons - chronicled the social mores of the 1950s and 1960s; adultery and sexual pathologies in general being a major fixation of his. His sports writing describes the evolution of football into the national passion of Brazil. He was heavily critical of the young leftists who opposed the military dictatorship after the 1964 coup; for that he was penned as right-wing and conservative. For a time heavily pro-dictatorship, he had to suffer the tragic fate of having one of his sons being tortured and incarcerated for belonging to an underground guerrilla organization.

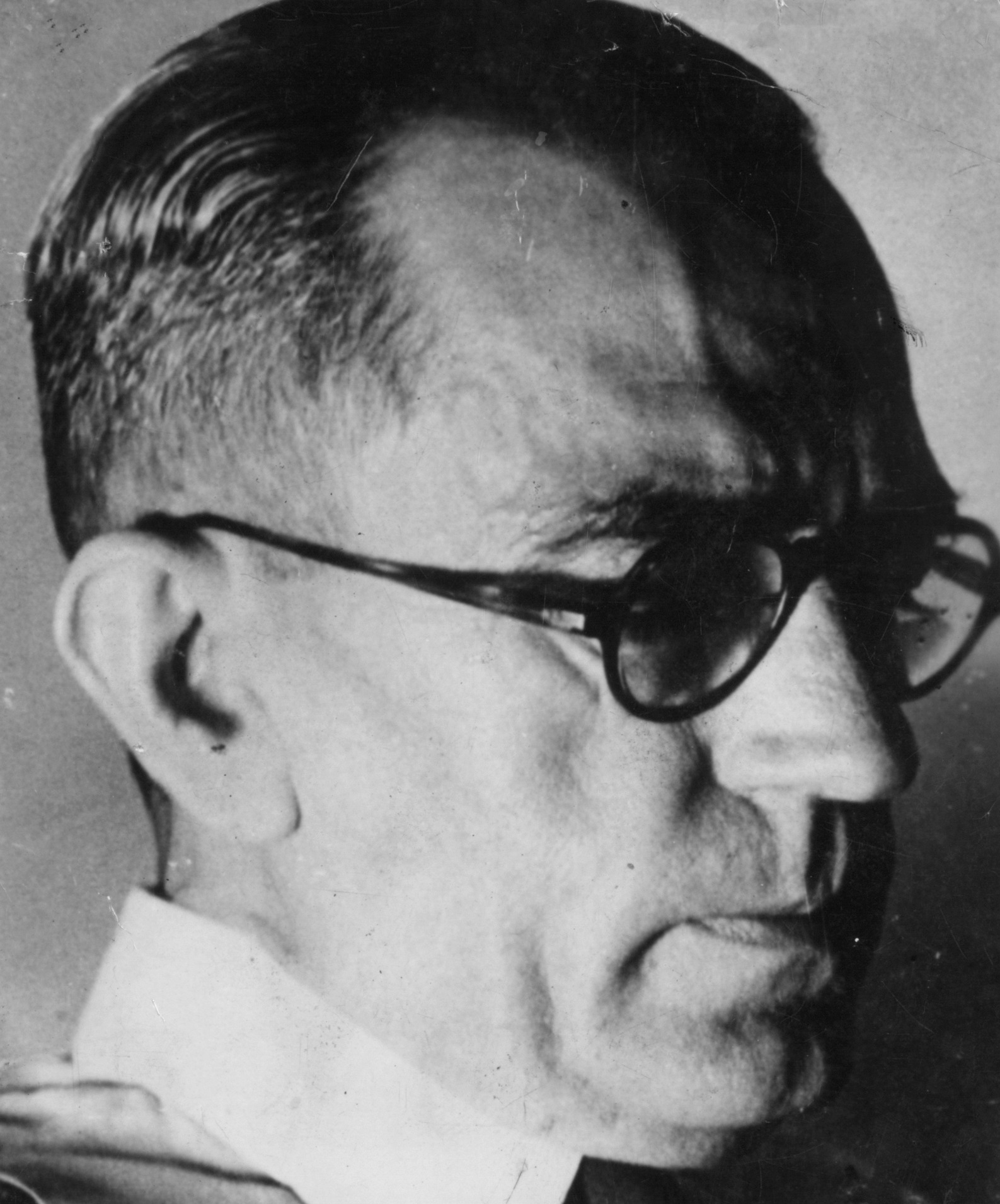
Graciliano Ramos

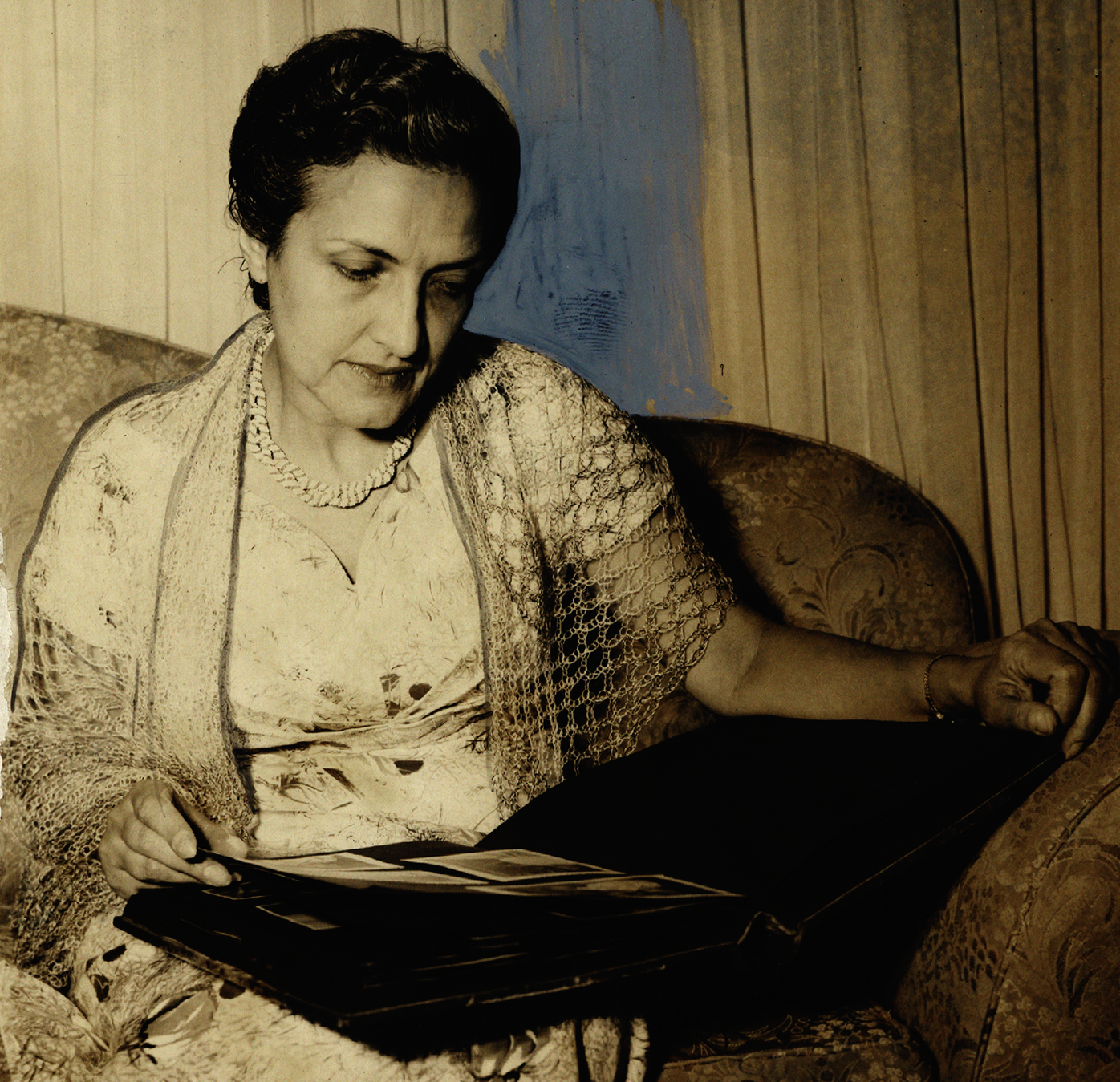
Cecília Meireles

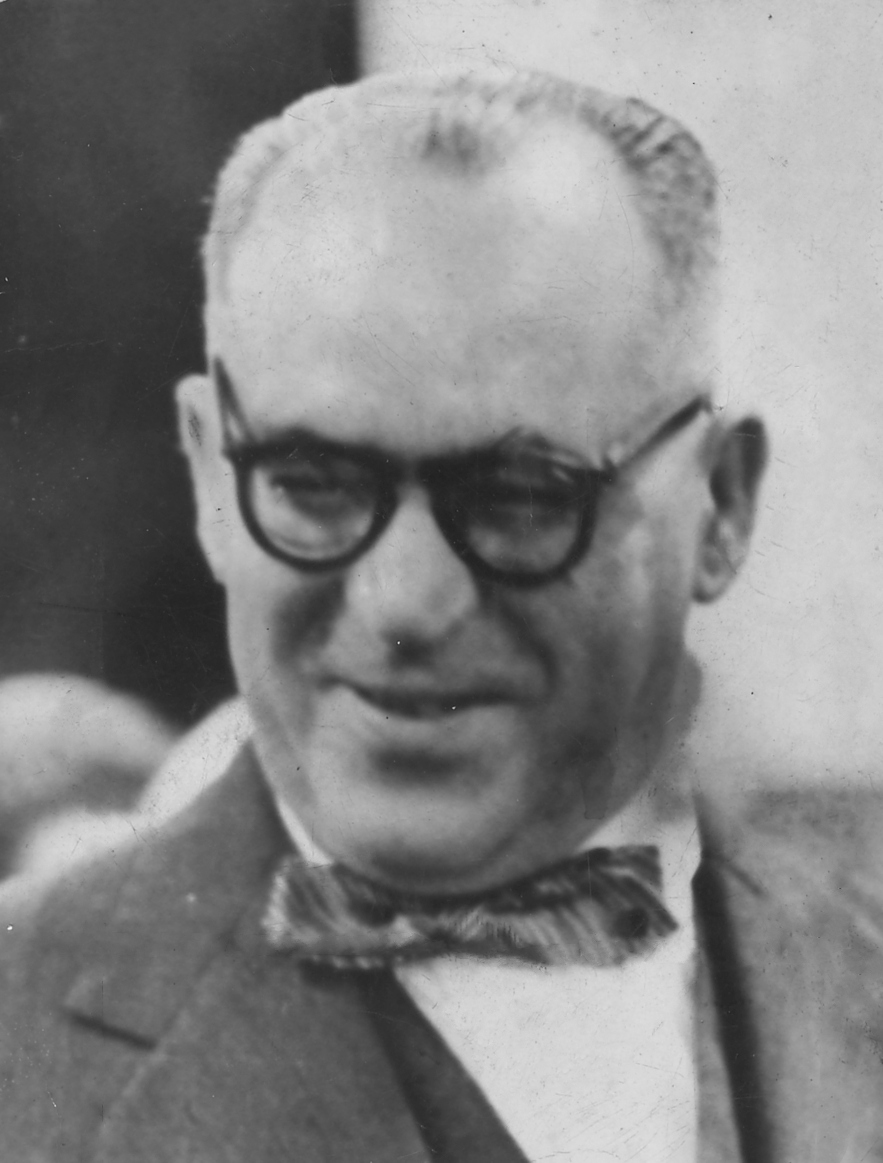
Guimarães Rosa

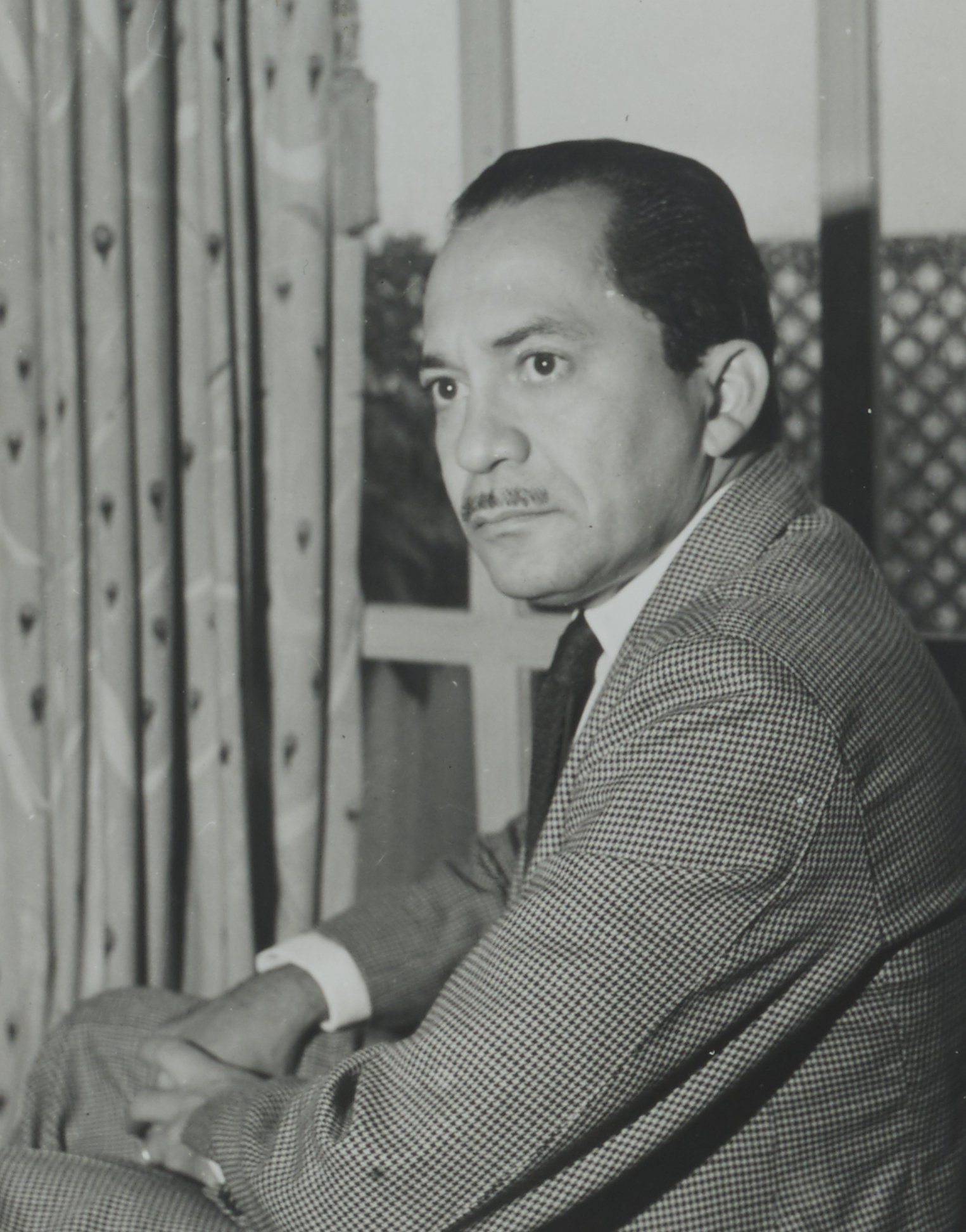
Lêdo Ivo

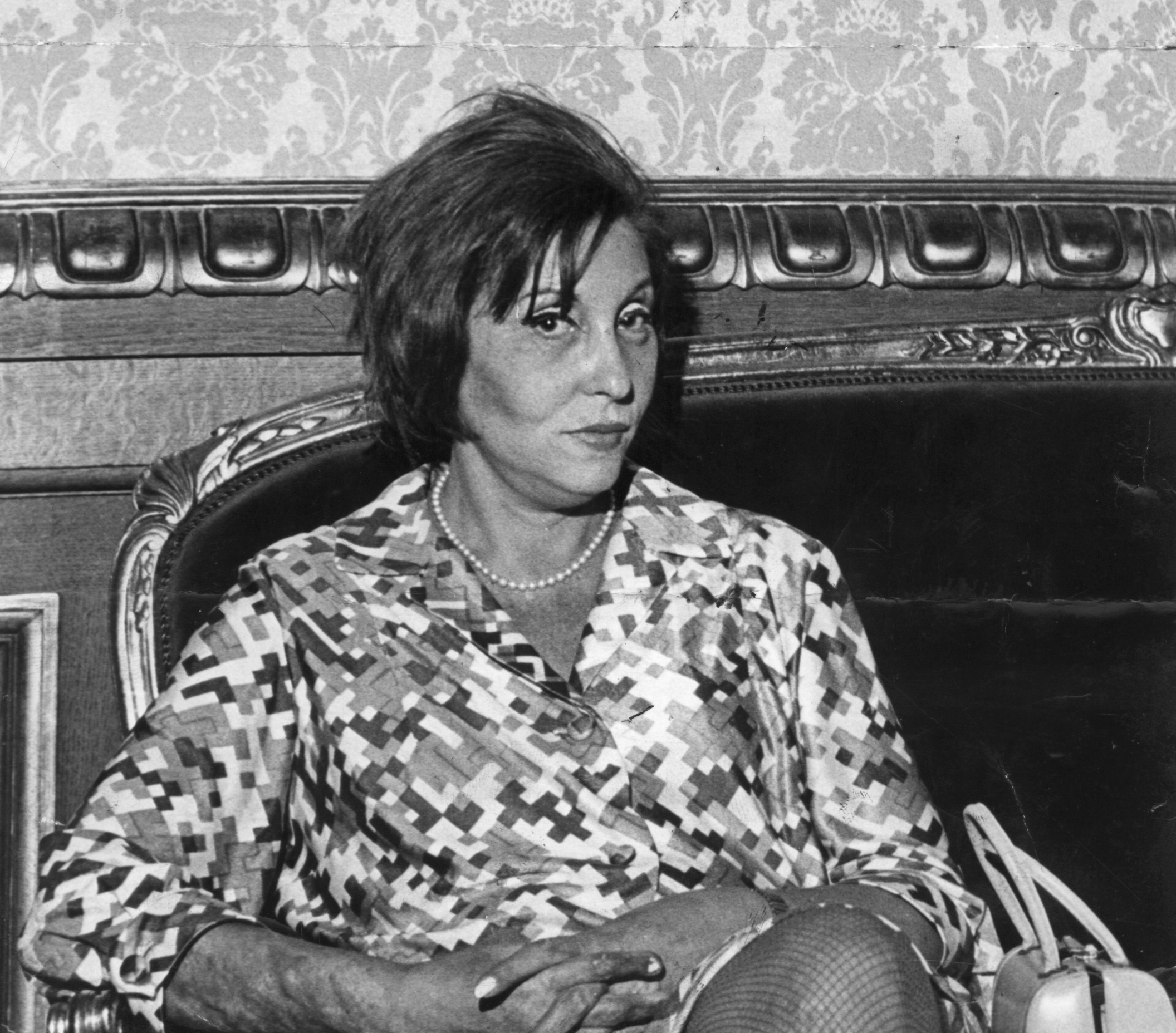
Clarice Lispector

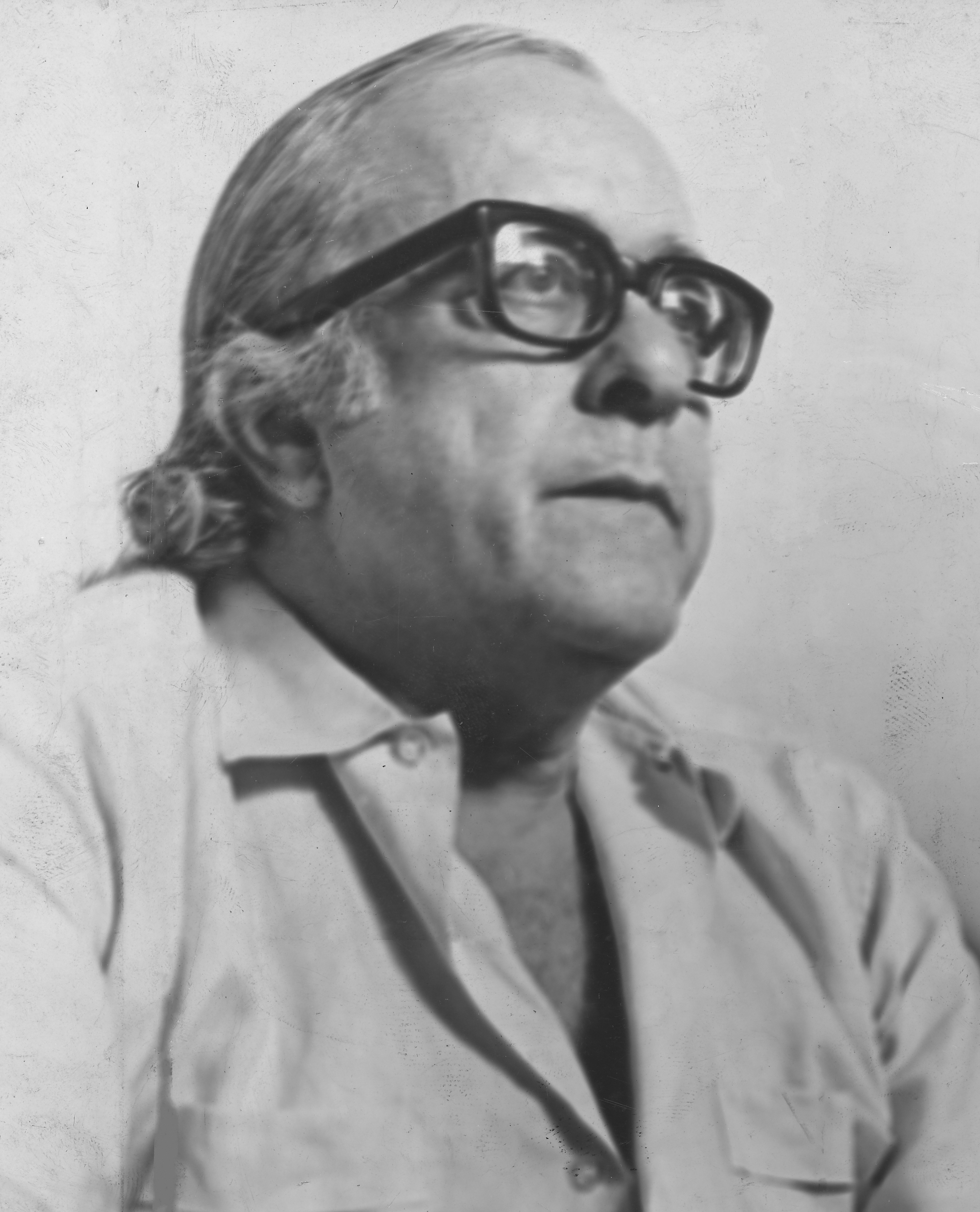
Vinicius de Moraes

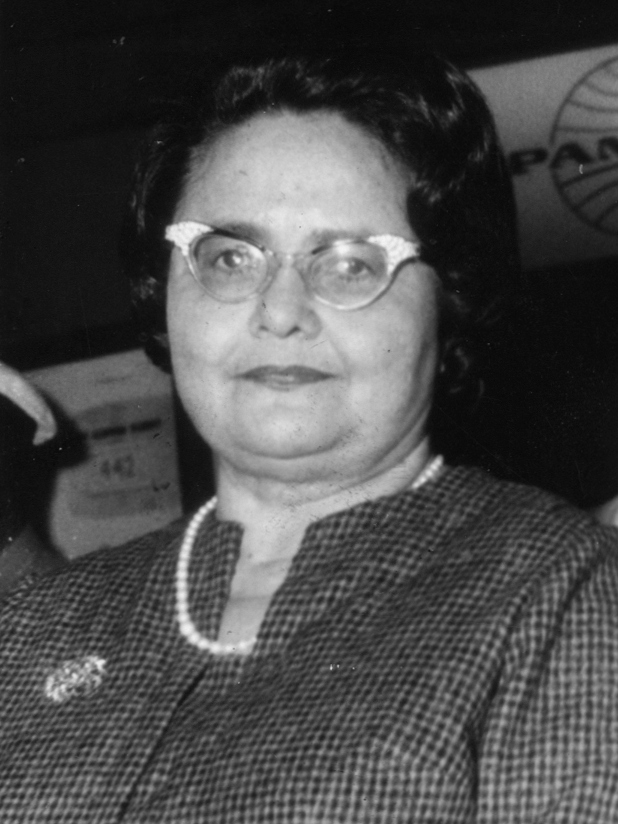
Rachel de Queiroz

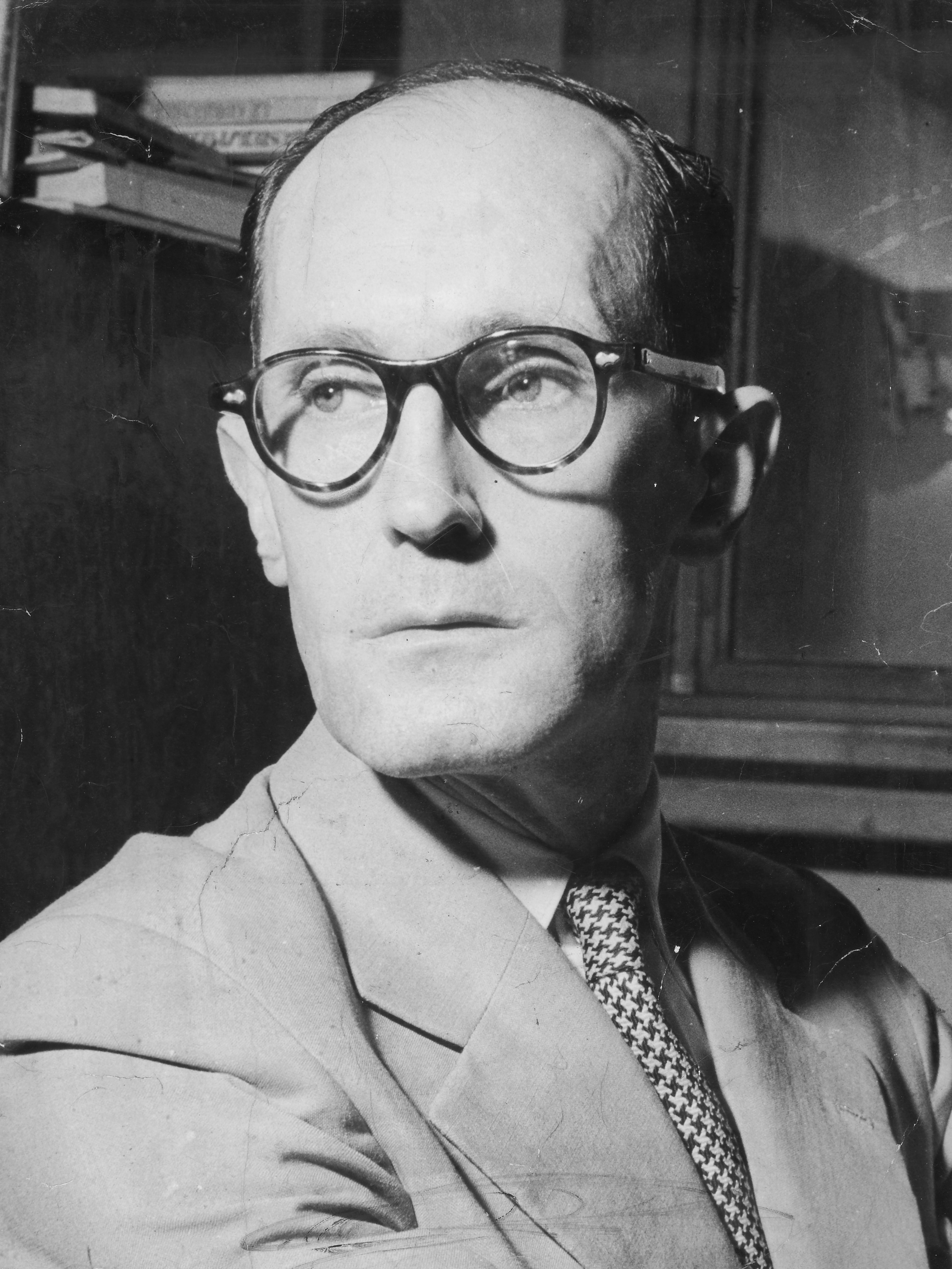
Carlos Drummond de Andrade

== Contemporary ==
Contemporary Brazilian literature is focused on city life and all its aspects: loneliness, violence, political issues and media control. Writers like Rubem Fonseca, Sérgio Sant'Anna have written important books with these themes in the 1970s, breaking new ground in Brazilian literature, up until then mostly having dealt with rural life.

New trends since the 1980s have included works by authors such as Caio Fernando Abreu, João Gilberto Noll, Milton Hatoum, Bernardo Carvalho, João Almino, Adriana Lisboa, Cristovão Tezza and Paulo Coelho.

Poets such as Ferreira Gullar and Manoel de Barros are noted within literary circles in Brazil, the former had been nominated for the Nobel Prize.

In recent years, "marginal literature" exploring the experiences of those socially, politically or economically excluded from Brazilian society has risen to prominence with authors and poets such as Sérgio Vaz and Ferréz making appearances at important events like Festa Literária Internacional de Paraty, Flipside and Bienal do Livro de São Paulo. Other poets such as Adélia Prado, Elisa Lucinda, Luis Alexandre Ribeiro Branco, have contributed to the contemporary movement through highlighting the often-neglected Afro and Indigenous Brazilian experience, corresponding with the Movimento Negro Unificado and the Articulation of Indigenous People of Brazil rising to cultural prominence.

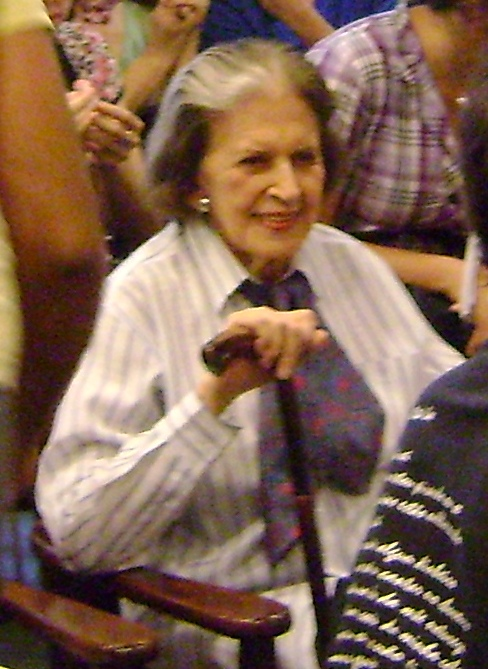
Lygia Fagundes Telles

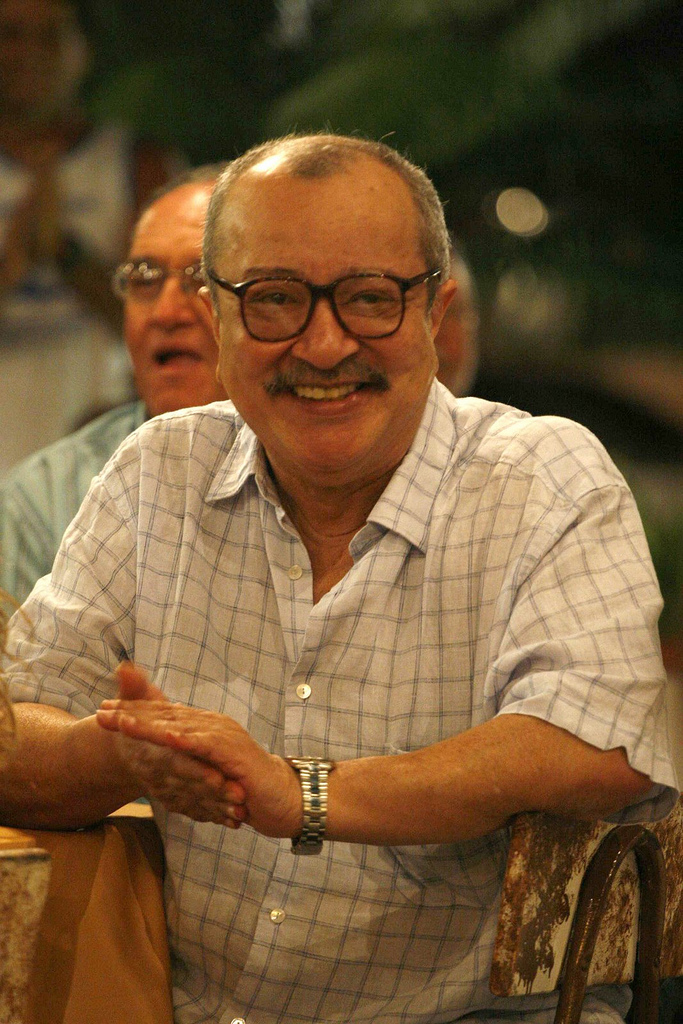
João Ubaldo Ribeiro

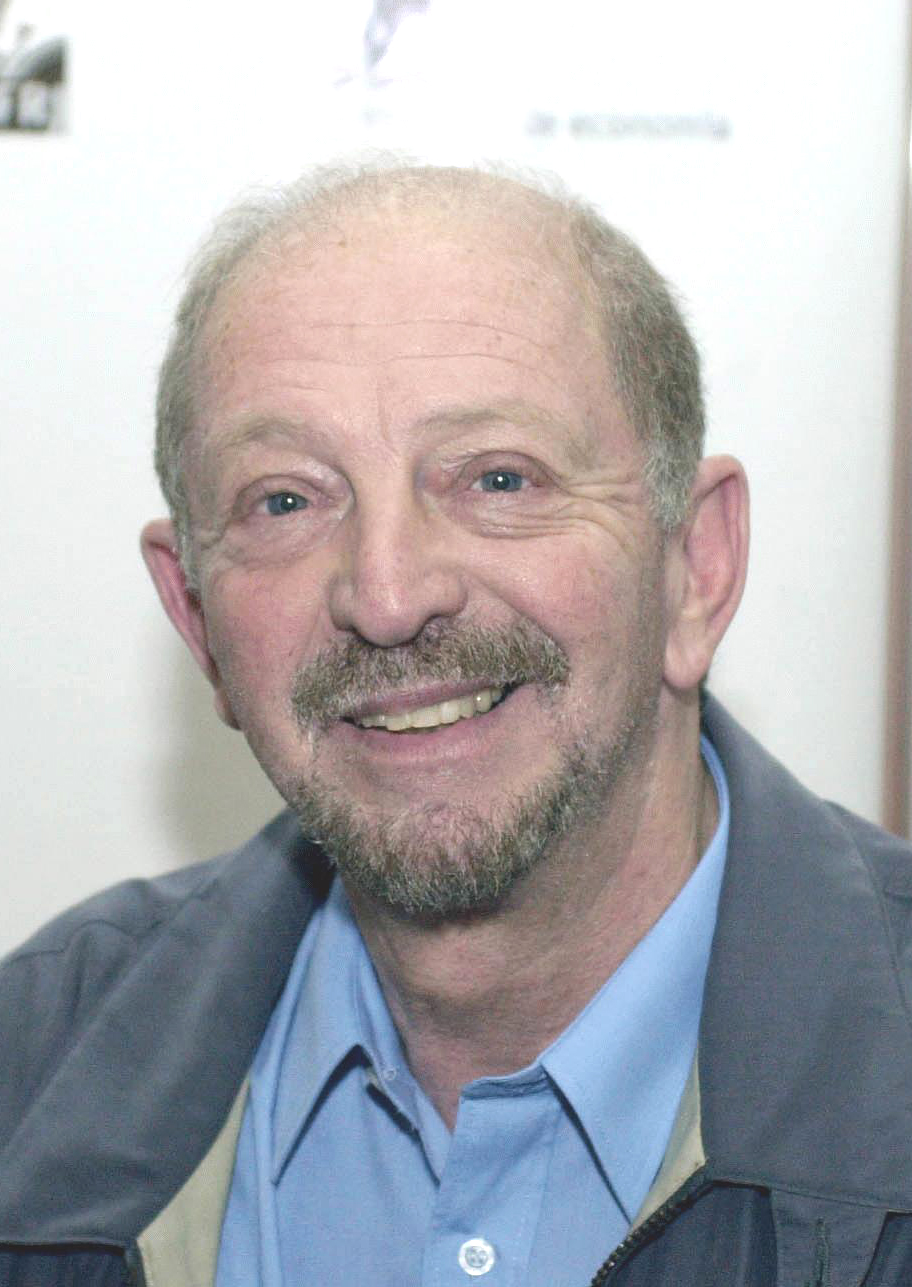
Moacyr Scliar

== See also ==
- List of Brazilian writers
- Latin American literature
- Angolan literature
- Portuguese literature
- Brazilian art
- Brazilian science fiction
- Modernism in Brazil
- List of libraries in Brazil

== Bibliography ==
- Galvão, Walnice Nogueira (2005). As Musas sob Assédio: Literatura e indústria cultural no Brasil (in Portuguese).
- Coutinho, Afrânio (2004). A Literatura no Brasil (in Portuguese).
- Lopes, Denilson (2007). A Delicadeza: estética, experiência e paisagens (in Portuguese).
- Vernon, David (2026). Never Never Yes Yes: The Novels, Stories & Crônicas of Clarice Lispector. Endellion Press. ISBN 978-1739136154
