= Ramiz Galvão =

Brazilian doctor and scholar (1846–1938)

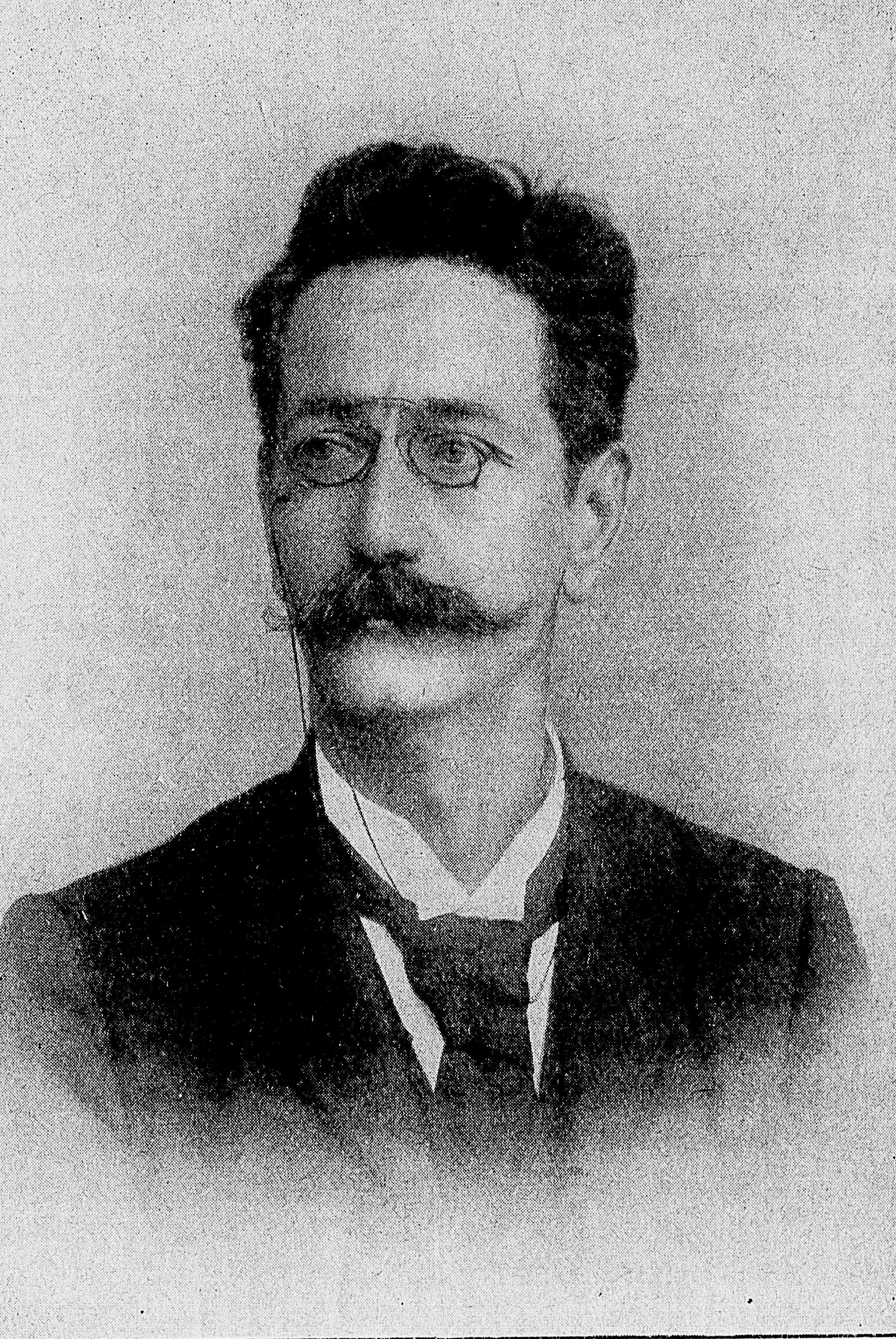
Ramiz Galvão in 1907

Benjamin Franklin de Ramiz Galvão (1846–1938) was a Brazilian doctor, scholar, administrator and public intellectual.

== Early life and education ==
He was born in Rio Pardo, and grew up in Rio de Janeiro where he attended Colégio Amante da Instrução and Colégio Pedro II, the latter on a scholarship. He trained as a doctor and later taught at the Rio de Janeiro School of Medicine.

== Career ==
A precocious talent, he published his first book aged just 19. He went on to teach and publish in a wide variety of fields. Among his works on Portuguese philology was the controversial Vocabulário etimológico, ortográfico e prosódico das palavras portuguesas derivadas da língua grega, published in 1909. As a translator, he translated the war memoir Le retraite de Laguna by the Viscount of Taunay, from French into Portuguese.

He was tutor to the children of Isabel, Princess Imperial of Brazil through the 1880s. He even taught Greek to Emperor Pedro II himself; the latter made him a baron in 1888. He held numerous other important positions throughout his career. He was director of the National Library for 12 years, and he was the first rector of the Federal University of Rio de Janeiro. He succeeded Carlos de Laet to the Brazilian Academy of Letters, serving as a member from 1928 to his death in 1938. He was president of the academy in 1933–34. He was also a member of other learned bodies such as the National Academy of Medicine and the Brazilian Historic and Geographic Institute.

== Death and legacy ==
He died in Rio in 1938, aged 91. A neighbourhood in his hometown of Rio Pardo is now named after him.
