= Herberto Sales =

Brazilian writer and journalist (1917–1999)

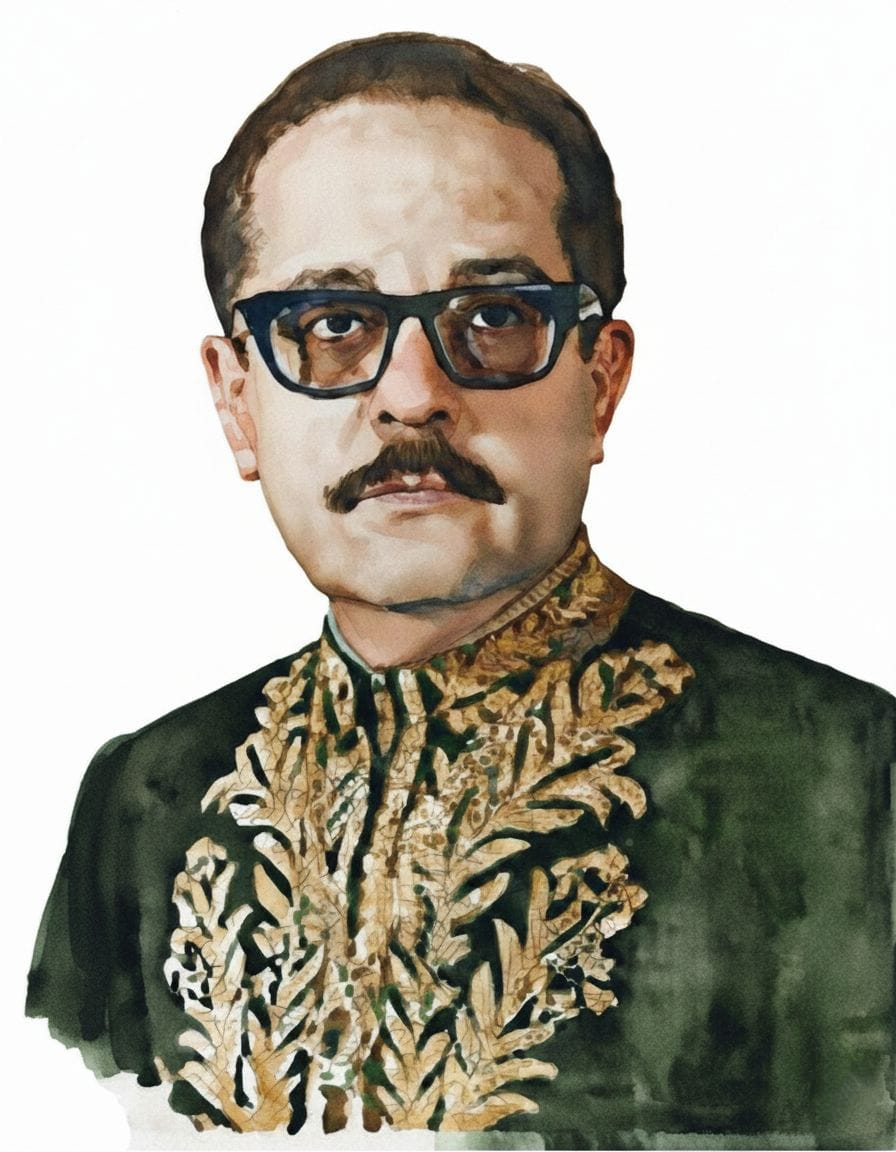
- Herberto Sales (1917–1999) during his inauguration at the Brazilian Academy of Letters (Chair 3) in 1971. Watercolor portrait in formal attire.
- Born: September 21 1917; Andaraí, Bahia
- Died: August 13 1999; Rio de Janeiro
- Occupation: writer
- Writing career
- Period: 1944 - 1997
- Notable work: Dados Biográficos do Finado Marcelino
- Notable awards: Prêmio Jabuti, 1977

Herberto de Azevedo Sales (September 21, 1917 – August 13, 1999) was a Brazilian writer, journalist, and merchant. He was a member of the Brazilian Academy of Letters.

== Biography ==
=== Early years ===
Sales completed his elementary education in his hometown, Andaraí, a small mining city in the Chapada Diamantina. He then moved to Salvador to enroll at the Jesuit Antonio Vieira College, where his literary talent was noticed and stimulated by teachers, especially Father Cabral, who also taught and encouraged both Anísio Teixeira and Jorge Amado.

=== Career ===
Despite the favorable environment, Sales left school without graduating, and returned to his hometown, where he lived until 1948, working as a notary officer. Around that time, he also worked as a diamond prospector and merchant. These experiences inspired his first novel, Cascalho, which drew the attention of the dictionarist Aurélio Buarque de Holanda for its rich regional vocabulary.

The novel sparked controversy in Sales's hometown, earning the author death threats from wealthy diamond miners who felt they had been portrayed in a negative light. Sales then moved to Rio de Janeiro, where he began working as a journalist for various press agencies, especially the magazine O Cruzeiro, at whose publishing house he edited the collection História da Literatura Ocidental.

His second novel, Além dos Marimbus, which recounts a man's travel to purchase a farm, was acclaimed by João Guimarães Rosa, Marques Rebelo, and Rachel de Queiroz.

In 1965, he published Dados Biográficos do Finado Marcelino (pt), whose minutious craft and melancholic atmosphere drew comparison to Proust's À la recherche du temps perdu. In the novel, the narrator attempts to reconstruct scenes from the life of his deceased uncle, a mysterious, eccentric figure who made his fortune as a merchant, spending his final years as a bon vivant.

In 1974, Sales moved to Brasília, where he became director of the National Book Institute. In 1977, his sci-fi novel O Fruto do Vosso Ventre, a critique of the military dictatorship portraying a dystopian future, was awarded the Prêmio Jabuti. During José Sarney's term, Sales was appointed advisor to the Presidency of the Republic, before moving to Paris, where he served as cultural attaché at the Brazilian Embassy. Upon returning to Brazil, he sought isolation at the small town of São Pedro da Aldeia.

==== Marriage ====
He was married to Maria Juraci Xavier Chamusca Sales, with whom he had three children.

== Works ==
- Cascalho, romance (1944)
- Os Belos Contos da Eterna Infância, anthology (1948)
- Baixo Relêvo, crônica (1954)
- Além dos Marimbus, romance (1961)
- Dados Biográficos do Finado Marcelino, romance (1965)
- Histórias Ordinárias, short stories (1966)
- O Sobradinho dos Pardais, juvenile literature (1969)
- O Lobisomem e outros contos folclóricos, short stories (1970)
- Uma Telha de Menos, short stories (1970)
- O Japão: experiências e observações de uma viagem, travel notes (1971)
- A Feiticeira da Salina, juvenile literature (1974)
- A Vaquinha Sabida, juvenile literature (1974)
- O Homenzinho dos Patos, juvenile literature (1975)
- O Fruto do Vosso Ventre, romance (1976)
- O Casamento da Raposa com a Galinha, juvenile literature (1979)
- Armado Cavaleiro o Audaz Motoqueiro, short stories (1980)
- O Burrinho que Queria ser Gente, juvenile literature (1980)
- Os Pequenos Afluentes, short stories (1980)
- Einstein, o Minigênio, romance (1983)
- Os Pareceres do Tempo, romance (1984)
- O Menino Perdido, infanto-juvenil (1984)
- A Volta dos Pardais do Sobradinho, juvenile literature (1985)
- A Porta de Chifre, romance (1986)
- Subsidiário, memories (1988)
- Na Relva da tua Lembrança, memories (1988)
- Andanças por umas Lembranças (Subsidiário 2), memories (1990)
- O Urso Caçador, juvenile literature (1991)
- Eu de mim com cada um de mim (Subsidiário 3), memories (1992)
- Rio dos Morcegos, romance (1993)
- As Boas Más Companhias, romance (1995)
- Rebanho do Ódio, romance (1995)
- A Prostituta, romance (1996)
- História natural de Jesus de Nazaré: uma narrativa cristã, romance (1997)

== Brazilian Academy of Letters ==
On April 6, 1971, he was elected as the fourth occupant of the Chair no. 3 of the Brazilian Academy of Letters, succeeding Aníbal Freire da Fonseca, and was ceremonially received by Marques Rebelo.

=== Academia Brasiliense de Letras ===
He was also a member of Academia Brasiliense de Letras, from the Federal District.
