= Hilda Hilst =

Brazilian poet, novelist, and playwright

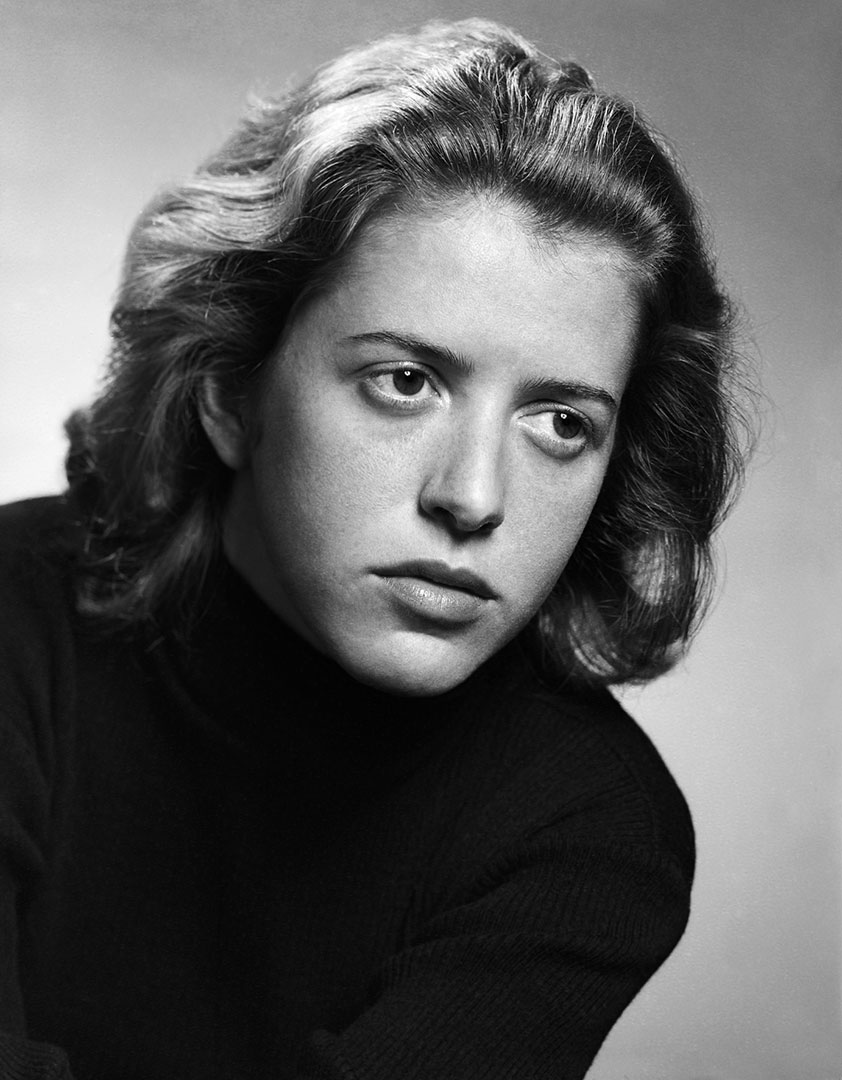
- Hilst in 1952
- Born: Hilda de Almeida Prado Hilst; 21 April 1930 Jaú, São Paulo, Brazil
- Died: 4 February 2004 (aged 73) Campinas, São Paulo, Brazil
- Occupation: Poet; novelist; playwright
- Genres: Poetry; novel; play
- Years active: 1950–2004
- Spouse: Dante Casarini (m. 1968; div. 1980)

Hilda de Almeida Prado Hilst (21 April 1930 – 4 February 2004) was a Brazilian poet, novelist, and playwright. Her work touches on the themes of mysticism, insanity, the body, eroticism, and female sexual liberation. Hilst greatly revered the work of James Joyce and Samuel Beckett, and the influence of their styles—like stream of consciousness and fractured reality—is evident in her own work.

Born in Jaú, São Paulo, Hilst graduated from the University of São Paulo in 1952. While studying there, she published her first book of poems, Omen (Presságio), in 1950. After a brief trip to Europe, Hilst was influenced by Nikos Kazantzakis' Report to Greco to move away from the São Paulo scene, and she secluded herself in an estate near the outskirts of Campinas. Deciding to devote her life to her literary creations, she constructed the House of the Sun (Casa do Sol), where she would invite several artists and intellectuals to live.

Writing forty works over her lifetime, she was one of the most prolific writers of her generation. Her works were mostly not well known outside of her home country until after her death, when several of her books were translated to English.

== Life and career ==
=== Early years ===
Hilda de Almeida Prado Hilst was the only daughter of Apolônio de Almeida Prado Hilst and Bedecilda Vaz Cardoso. Her father owned a coffee plantation and also worked as a journalist, poet, and essayist. He was affected by schizophrenia throughout his life. Her mother came from a conservative Portuguese immigrant family. The conditions of her parents' mental health (and the relationships they had with mental health) greatly influenced Hilst's writing, and her books describe several experiences she had with her father. Her parents separated in 1932 while she was still an infant, and three years later her father received the diagnosis of schizophrenia and thereafter spent much of his life in mental institutions. Her mother was also institutionalized at the end of her life, in the same institution as her husband.

Hilst grew up in Jaú, a town in the state of São Paulo, with her mother and half brother from her mother's previous marriage. Hilst attended elementary and high school at Collegia Santa Marcelina in São Paulo before enrolling in a bachelor's degree program at Mackenzie Presbyterian University. Before Hilst started college, her mother told her of her father's condition, and Hilst went to visit him in a mental institution for the first time.

After graduating from Mackenzie, Hilst began studying for her second degree at the law school at the University of São Paulo, where she met her lifelong friend Lygia Fagundes.

=== Early career ===
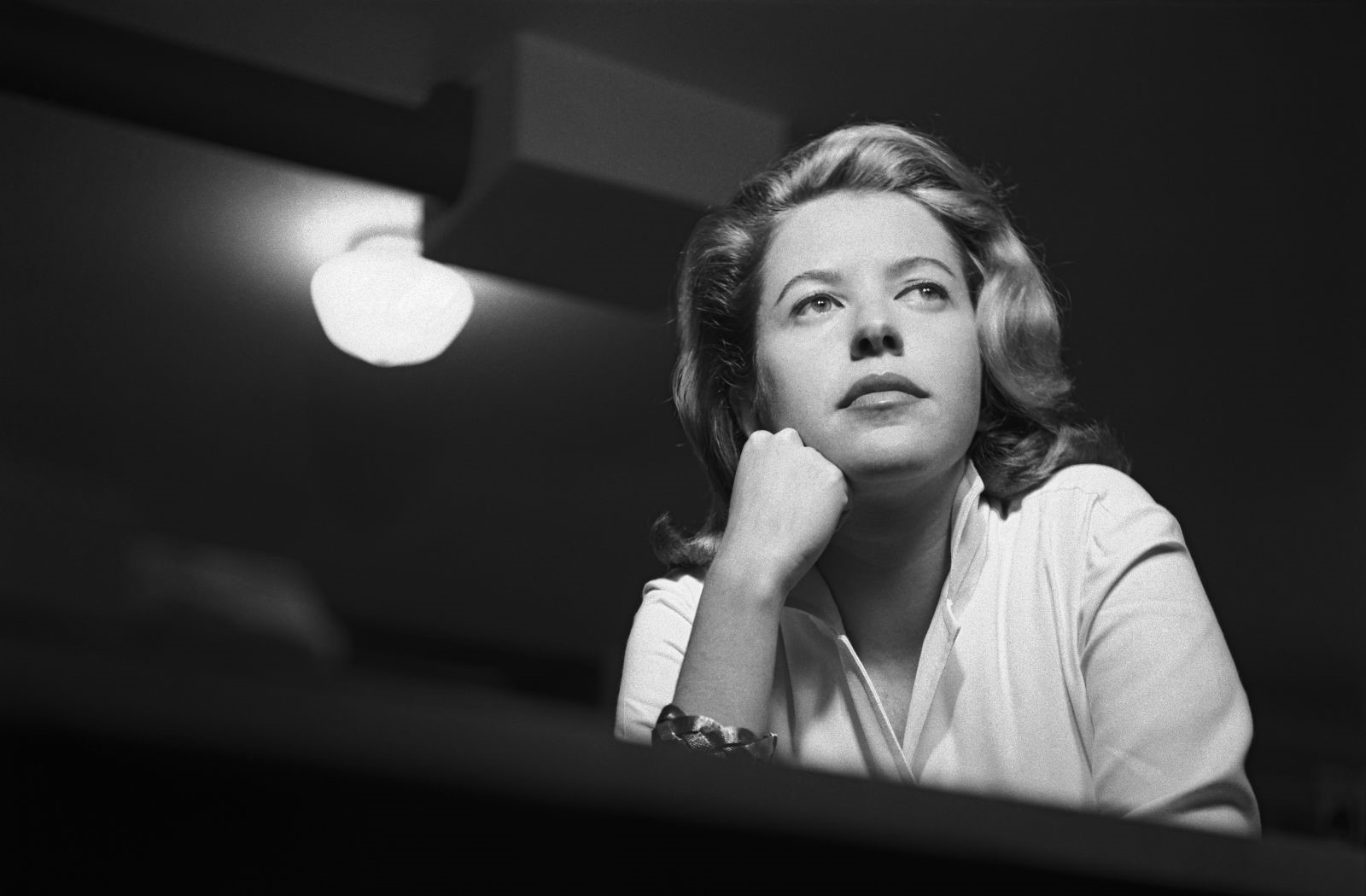
Hilda in 1954

Hilst published her first book of poetry in 1950, Omen (Presságio), which received great acclaim from her contemporaries like Jorge de Lima and Cecília Meireles. It was not long before she published her second book, Ballad of Alzira (Balada de Alzira) in 1951. That same year Hilst took over guardianship of her father. Later in 1957, Hilst began her seven-month tour of Europe, traveling through France, Italy and Greece. There, she briefly dated singer-actor Dean Martin and impersonated a journalist, in an attempt to meet Marlon Brando. She asked him about his thoughts on Franz Kafka's works, to which he dismissively replied, "I won't think about Mr. Kafka".

Upon her return to São Paulo, she settled in the Sumaré neighborhood, and was frequently in the company of other artists, such as Gilka Machado and Bráulio Pedroso. However, after reading Nikos Kazantzakis' Report to Greco, and being influenced by its themes of self-isolation to achieve knowledge of the human being, Hilst decided to leave São Paulo in 1964 and return to her childhood home in Campinas.

She ordered the construction of a new house on the same property, nicknamed the House of the Sun (Casa do Sol), which she personally designed to be an artistic space for inspiration and creativity. When it was completed in 1966, she moved into the house with sculptor Dante Casarini, with whom she had a prior relationship. In September of the same year, her father died.

=== Theater and prose ===
At the House of the Sun, Hilst was particularly prolific as she started writing her first theater works, completing nine plays and one poetry compilation between 1967 and 1969. She married Casarini in 1968. Although the marriage only lasted twelve years, the two continued to live together in the House of the Sun. Hilst lived somewhat secluded in Campinas for the rest of her life, accompanied by other artists. The House of the Sun became a hub for artists and writers, who were invited to spend time there and enjoy the creative atmosphere. Two prominent artists to do so were Bruno Tolentino and Caio Fernando Abreu. During her time at the House of the Sun, Hilst also engaged in her own experiments with electronic voice phenomena, an electronic recording method that supposedly interprets the voices of the dead. In 1969, she built a second home, the Casa da Lua (House of the Moon). Her theater writings finished in the same year, with her turning instead to prose fiction with her experimental text Fluxo-Floema a year later.

=== Later years ===
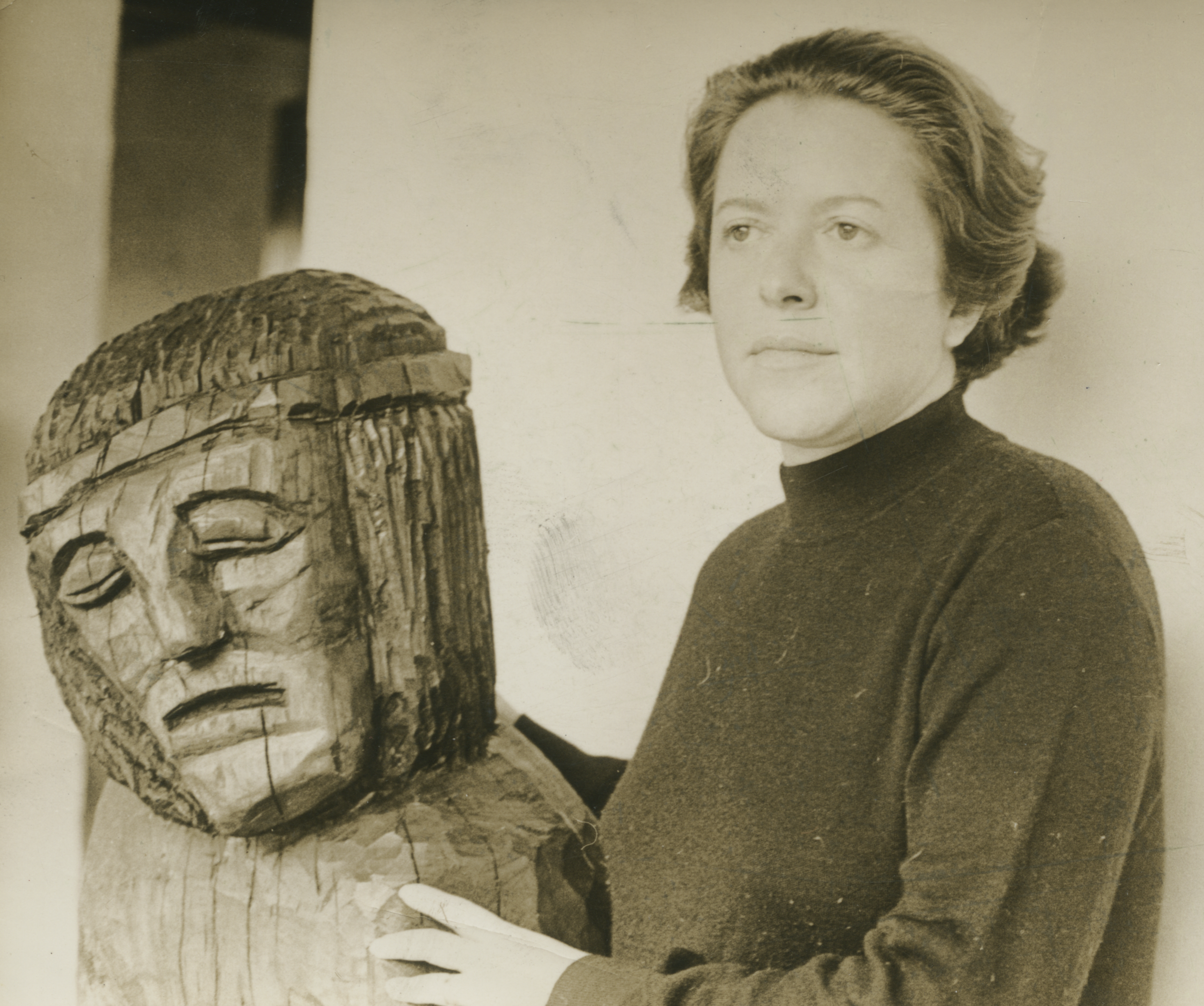
Hilda in 1970

In the 1980s, due to increasing financial pressure from a lack of book sales, Hilst participated in the Programa do Artista Residente (Artist-in-Residence program), at the Universidade Estadual de Campinas, being the first artist to do so. The program was conceived as a way for students to meet established authors. She later held other teaching positions at the university.

Hilst published Lori Lamby's Pink Notebook (O caderno rosa de Lori Lamby) in 1990, the first book of a pornographic tetralogy. She announced her "goodbye to serious literature" in the 1990s because she was "irritated by the meager reaching of her writing".

Meus livros não vendem, não são reeditados, as pessoas me acham difícil. Estou cansada desse estigma ... Fiquei desesperada com o esquecimento em torno do meu nome. Sempre quis ser lida, não queria ficar nas gavetas.

My books don't sell, they don't get reprinted, people find me difficult. I'm tired of this stigma ... I became desperate with the forgetfulness surrounding my name. I always wanted to be read, I didn't want to stay in the drawers.

— Hilda Hilst

A number of Hilst's books were originally published by smaller Brazilian publishers, but beginning in 2001, Editora Globo, the publishing branch of the Brazilian media organization Globo, began reissuing nearly all her works, as part of its Coleção Reunidas de Hilda Hilst. She stopped writing in the same year, telling an interviewer that she had said everything she wanted to say.

=== Death ===
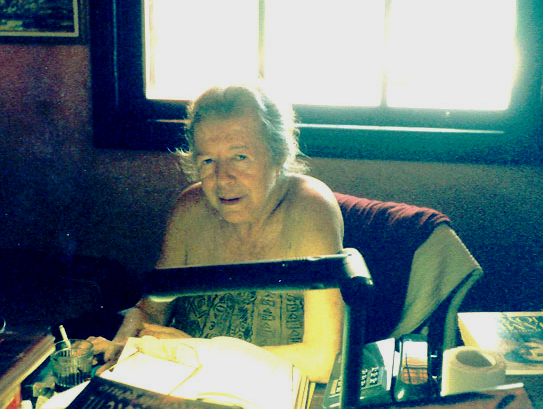
Hilda in 1988

Hilst died on 4 February 2004, in Campinas at the age of 73. She had been hospitalized at the Hospital das Clínicas da Unicamp since 2 January, following surgery for a fractured femur. Her health sharply declined after contracting an infection, aggravated by a chronic heart and pulmonary condition, before she eventually died due to multiple organ failure. Following her death, Hilst's friend Mora Fuentes created the Hilda Hilst Institute in her honor, an organization whose mission is to uphold the House of the Sun as a space for artistic creation and serves as a library and cultural center. Author Yuri Vieira, who lived in the House of the Sun for two years, wrote a book about his experiences there.

After her death, Hilst garnered more fame among English language readership as several of her novels were translated to the language, such as With My Dog Eyes, The Obscene Madame D., and Letters from a Seducer.

== Themes ==
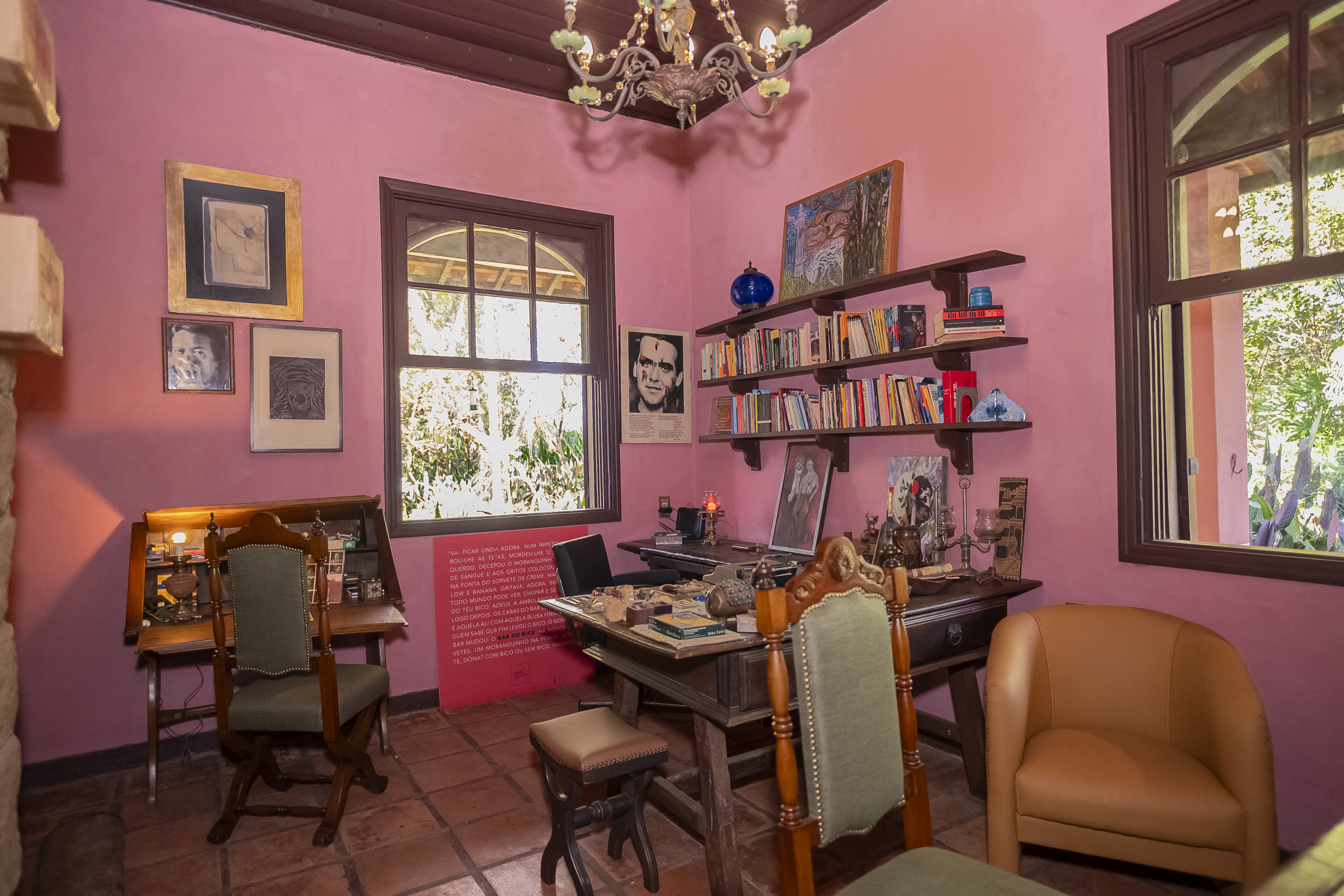
Inside of Casa do Sol in Campinas

Hilda Hilst wrote for almost 50 years, publishing forty books over her lifetime. The different periods of her life are reflected in the phases of her work: she began as a poet, publishing Presságio in 1950, through the time before she moved into the House of the Sun; around the death of her father and her marriage, she started publishing and staging plays in 1967; and shifted into prose in 1970, with her experimental text Fluxo-Floema. Throughout her career, beginning in 1958 with Adoniran Barbosa, musicians selected poems of hers to be set to music. Relatively obscure in her lifetime, her work has since been extensively studied and analyzed after her death. She has been highly referenced in books, magazines, academic journals, and others.

In several of her writings Hilst tackled politically and socially controversial issues, such as obscenity, queer sexuality, and incest. The tetralogy that comprises Lori Lamby's Pink Notebook (O caderno rosa de Lori Lamby) and Tales of Derision: Grotesque Texts (Contos d'escárnio. Textos grotescos) (1990); Cartas de um Sedutor (1991); and Bufólicas (1992), includes overtly pornographic material, if not pornography per se. Her pornographic work started as a response to the minimal popularity her previous works had with the general audience. She explored theological issues in her work as well, particularly regarding God and the "search of the divine". Other common themes in her writings include madness, old age, love, and death.

In Hilst's prose fiction, she employs several narrative features to build the narrative, including passages of metanarrative discourse; soliloquies; simulacra of dramatic theatrical texts; colloquial register of regional linguistic variants; words, expressions and quotations from foreign literary works in the language of origin – in English and Latin; stream of consciousness and fractured reality; sparse notes; poems; letters and questions addressed directly to the reader. She was greatly influenced by the works of James Joyce and Samuel Beckett, whom she greatly revered.

== Honors ==
In 1962 she won the Prêmio PEN Clube of São Paulo, for Sete Cantos do Poeta para o Anjo (Massao Ohno Editor, 1962). In 1969, the play O Verdugo took the Prêmio Anchieta, one of the most important cultural awards in the country at the time. The Brazilian Association of Art Critics (APCA Prize) deemed Ficções (Edições Quíron, 1977) the best book of the year. In 1981, Hilda Hilst won the Grande Prêmio da Crítica para o Conjunto da Obra, by the same association. In 1984, the Câmara Brasileira do Livro awarded her the Jabuti Prize for Cantares de Perda e Predileção, and the following year the same book claimed the Prêmio Cassiano Ricardo (Clube de Poesia de São Paulo). Rútilo Nada, published in 1993, took the Jabuti Prize for best short story, and finally, on 9 August 2002, she was awarded at the 47th edition of Prêmio Moinho Santista in the poetry category.

== Translation ==
Some of Hilst's texts have been translated from Brazilian Portuguese to French, English, Italian and German. In March 1997, her works Com meus olhos de cão and A obscena senhora D were published by Éditions Gallimard, translated by Maryvonne Lapouge. The latter was translated into English as The Obscene Madame D collaboratively by Nathanaël and Rachel Gontijo Araújo, and published jointly by Nightboat Books in New York and A Bolha Editora in Rio de Janeiro in 2012. In 2014, Letters from a Seducer, John Keene's translation of the 1991 novel Cartas de um sedutor, was published by Nightboat Books and A Bolha Editora, and With My Dog Eyes, Adam Morris's translation of Hilst's 1986 novella Com os meus olhos de cão, was published by Melville House.

== Publications ==
=== Poetry ===
- Presságio (Omen). São Paulo: Revista dos Tribunais (1950)
- Balada de Alzira (Ballad of Alzira). São Paulo: Edições Alarico (1951)
- Balada do festival (The Festival Ballad). Rio de Janeiro: Jornal de Letras (1955)
- Roteiro do silêncio (Script of Silence). Rio de Janeiro: Anhambi (1959)
- Trovas de muito amor para um amado senhor (Troves of Love for a Beloved Gentleman). São Paulo: Anhambi (1960)
- Ode fragmentária (Fragmentary Ode). São Paulo: Anhambi (1961)
- Sete cantos do poeta para o anjo (Seven Songs from the Poet to the Angel). São Paulo: Massao Ohno (1962)
- Poesia (1959–1967) (Poetry). São Paulo: Editora Sal (1967)
- Júbilo, memória, noviciado da paixão (Jubilation, Memory, Novitiate of the Passion). São Paulo: Massao Ohno (1974)
- Da morte. Odes mínimas (Of Death. Minimal Odes). São Paulo: Massao Ohno/Roswitha Kempf (1980)
- Poesia (1959–1979) (Poetry). São Paulo: Ed. Quíron/INL (1980)
- Cantares de perda e predileção (Songs of Loss and Predilection). São Paulo: Massao Ohno/M. Lydia Pires e Albuquerque (1983)
- Poemas malditos, gozosos e devotos (Damned, Joyful and Devout Poems). São Paulo: Massao Ohno/Ismael Guarnelli (1984)
- Sobre a tua grande face (Upon Your Great Face). São Paulo: Massao Ohno (1986)
- Amavisse. São Paulo: Massao Ohno. (1989)
- Alcoólicas (Alcoholics). São Paulo: Massao Ohno (1990)
- Bufólicas. São Paulo: Massao Ohno (1992)
- Do desejo (Of Desire). Campinas: Pontes (1992)
- Cantares do sem nome e de partidas (Songs of the Nameless and of Departures). São Paulo: Massao Ohno (1995)
- Do amor (Of Love). São Paulo: Edith Arnhold/Massao Ohno (1999)

=== Prose fiction ===
- Fluxo-floema. São Paulo: Perspectiva (1970) / São Paulo: Editora Globo (2001) ISBN 9788525036308
- Qadós. São Paulo: Edart (1973) / São Paulo: Editora Globo (2001) ISBN 9788525035431
- Ficções (Fictions). São Paulo: Quíron (1977)
- Tu não te moves de ti (You Don't Move from Yourself). São Paulo: Cultura (1980) / São Paulo: Editora Globo (2004) ISBN 9788525038531
- A obscena senhora D (The Obscene Miss D). São Paulo: Massao Ohno (1982) / São Paulo: Editora Globo (2001) ISBN 9788525034649. English translation: The Obscene Madame D. Callicoon: Nightboat (2012)
- Com meus olhos de cão e outras novelas (With My Dog Eyes and Other Novels). São Paulo: Brasilense (1986) / São Paulo: Editora Globo (2012) ISBN 9788525041005. English translation: With My Dog-Eyes. New York City: Melville House (2014)
- O caderno rosa de Lori Lamby (Lori Lamby's Pink Notebook). São Paulo: Massao Ohno (1990)
- Contos d'escárnio: Textos grotescos (Tales of Mockery: Grotesque Texts). São Paulo: Siciliano, (1990) / São Paulo: Editora Globo (2001) ISBN 9788525036193
- Cartas de um sedutor. São Paulo: Paulicéia (1991) / São Paulo: Editora Globo (2001) ISBN 9788525034915. English translation: Letters from a Seducer: Callicoon: Nightboat (2012)
- Rútilo nada. Campinas: Pontes (1993) / São Paulo: Editora Globo (2003) ISBN 9788525036957
- Estar sendo. Ter sido (Being. Having Been). São Paulo: Nankin (1997) / São Paulo: Editora Globo (2006) ISBN 8525041882
- Cascos e carícias: crônicas reunidas (Hooves and Caresses: Collected Chronicles). São Paulo: Nankin (1998)

=== Theater ===
- A empresa (A possessa) (The Business (the Possessed)) (1967) (Note: Published as part of Teatro completo (Complete Theater), São Paulo: Globo Livros, 2008.)
- O rato no muro (The Rat in the Wall) (1967)
- O visitante (The Visitor) (1968)
- Auto da barca de Camiri (Camiri's Boat) (1968)
- O novo sistema (The New System) (1968)
- Aves da noite (Night Birds) (1968)
- O verdugo (The Headsman) (1969)
- A morte de patriarca (The Death of the Patriarch) (1969)
