= História da Literatura Ocidental =

1959 book

- Author: Otto Maria Carpeaux
- Language: Brazilian portuguese
- Subject: Western literature
- Genre: Literary history
- Publisher: Edições O Cruzeiro
- Publication date: 1959
- Pages: 2882 (Federal Senate edition)
- Award: Prêmio Jabuti (1964)

História da Literatura Ocidental (English: A History of Western Literature) is a narrative history of Western literature written by the Brazilian literary critic Otto Maria Carpeaux, covering the period from Classical antiquity to the 20th century. Published in 1959, it is regarded as a singular work in Brazilian literature and culture.

== Content ==
Carpeaux's exploration of the Western canon begins in ancient Greek literature, particularly Homer, whom he deems "the greatest poet", and continues through Roman literature, the Early Christian period, the Middle Ages, the Renaissance, the Baroque, Classicism, Romanticism, Bourgeois literature, Naturalism, Symbolism, the so-called ''modernist revolts'', and finally reaching what he terms 20th-century ''contemporary tendencies''.

== Editions ==
The work was originally published in an eight-volume edition organized by the novelist Herberto Sales, and was followed by a revised and expanded 1978 edition from Editorial Alhambra, which was later reissued in 2008 by the Federal Senate in four volumes. In 2021, Editora Sétimo Selo published the series in a three-volume edition. Some extracts have been translated into other languages, including French.

The original version has been digitalised by HathiTrust and is available online at research libraries. Another version can be found on Internet Archive.

== Reception ==
Besides earning Carpeaux the 1964 Jabuti Prize for Literary History, the series received critical acclaim from major literary figures, such as Carlos Drummond de Andrade, Antonio Candido, Álvaro Lins, Carlos Heitor Cony, and Gilberto Freyre.
