= Dora Ferreira da Silva =

- Born: July 1, 1918; Conchas, Brazil
- Died: April 6, 2006 (aged 87); São Paulo, Brazil
- Education: University of São Paulo
- Occupations: Poet, teacher, translator
- Spouse: Vicente Ferreira da Silva (1937 or 1938 - 1963)
- Writing career
- Period: 1970 - 2009
- Notable work: Poesia reunida (1999)
- Notable awards: Prêmio Jabuti (1971, 1996 and 2005); Prêmio Machado de Assis (1999); Prêmio ABL de Poesia (2000)
- Movement: Modernism in Brazil

Dora Ferreira da Silva (July 1, 1918 – April 6, 2006) was a Brazilian poet, essayist and translator. According to the literary critic Ivan Junqueira, Silva used a ''voiceless language to express the inexpressible''.

Silva's poetry, which ranges from traditional to modern forms, including concrete verse, explores themes such as myth, the sacred, and time. She rendered into Portuguese works by Rainer Maria Rilke, Friedrich Hölderlin and Carl Gustav Jung. She was awarded the Prêmio Machado de Assis in 1999 and received the Prêmio Jabuti three times.

Silva was married to the philosopher Vicente Ferreira da Silva.

== Works ==
- Andanças, 1970
- Uma via de ver as coisas, 1973
- Menina e seu mundo, 1976
- Jardins (Esconderijos), 1979
- Talhamar, 1982
- Tauler e Jung, 1987
- Retratos da origem, 1988
- Poemas da estrangeira, 1996
- Poemas em fuga, 1997
- Poesia Reunida, 1999
- Cartografia do Imaginário, 2003
- Hídrias, 2005
- O Leque, 2007
- Appassionata, 2008
- Transpoemas, 2009
