= Alberto da Cunha Melo =

- Born: April 8, 1942; Jaboatão dos Guararapes, Pernambuco, Brazil
- Died: October 13, 2007 (aged 65); Recife, Pernambuco, Brazil
- Occupations: Journalist, writer
- Writing career
- Notable work: Poesia reunida (2017)
- Notable awards: Prêmio ABL de Poesia (2007)

José Alberto Tavares da Cunha Melo (April 8, 1942 – October 13, 2007) was a Brazilian poet. His works, written primarily in the octosyllabic meter – the rarest in Portuguese-language poetry – address themes like the sacred, freedom, death, and loneliness.

He was heavily influenced by João Cabral de Melo Neto.

== Biography ==
Born to a family with literary traditions, he was introduced to poetry at an early age, soon discerning in it his vocation. His father, Benedito Cunha Melo (pt), wrote the hymn of Melo's birthplace, Jaboatão dos Guararapes. He debuted with his 1966 book Círculo Cósmico, which was received with enthusiasm by the critic César Leal (pt).

Mello's poetry, conceived within the literary movement known as Geração 65, has been praised by the likes of Alfredo Bosi, Bruno Tolentino, and Raimundo Carrero. His book O Cão de Olhos Amarelos & Outros Poemas Inéditos earned him the ABL Prize for Poetry.

== Work ==
- Círculo Cósmico, 1966
- Oração pelo Poema. 1969
- Publicação do Corpo, 1974
- A Noite da Longa Aprendizagem, 1978
- Dez Poemas Políticos, 1979
- Noticiário, 1979
- Poemas à Mão Livre, 1981
- Soma dos Sumos, 1983
- Poemas Anteriores, 1989
- Clau, 1992
- A Rural também Ensina a Semear a Poesia, 1992
- Carne de Terceira com Poemas à Mão Livre, 1996
- Yacala, 1999
- Meditação sob os Lajedos, 2002
- Dois Caminhos e uma Oração, 2003
- O Cão de Olhos Amarelos & Outros Poemas Inéditos, 2006
- Marco Zero: Crônica, 2009
- Cantos de Contar, 2012
- Poesia completa, 2017
