= Aldemir Martins =

Brazilian artist

- Born: November 8, 1922; Ceará, Brazil
- Died: February 6, 2006 (aged 83); São Paulo, Brazil
- Known for: Paintings, drawings, illustrations of São Paulo flora and fauna
- Awards: Prêmio Jabuti

Aldemir Martins (born in Ceará on November 8, 1922; died in São Paulo on February 6, 2006) was a Brazilian artist. He is noted for paintings, drawings, and illustrations which depicted the flora and fauna of his native state.

His 1957 artwork, Bird, is held by the Museum of Modern Art.

== Awards ==
- 1959: Prêmio Jabuti
