= ApexBrasil =

Brazilian Trade and Investment Promotion Agency (ApexBrasil)
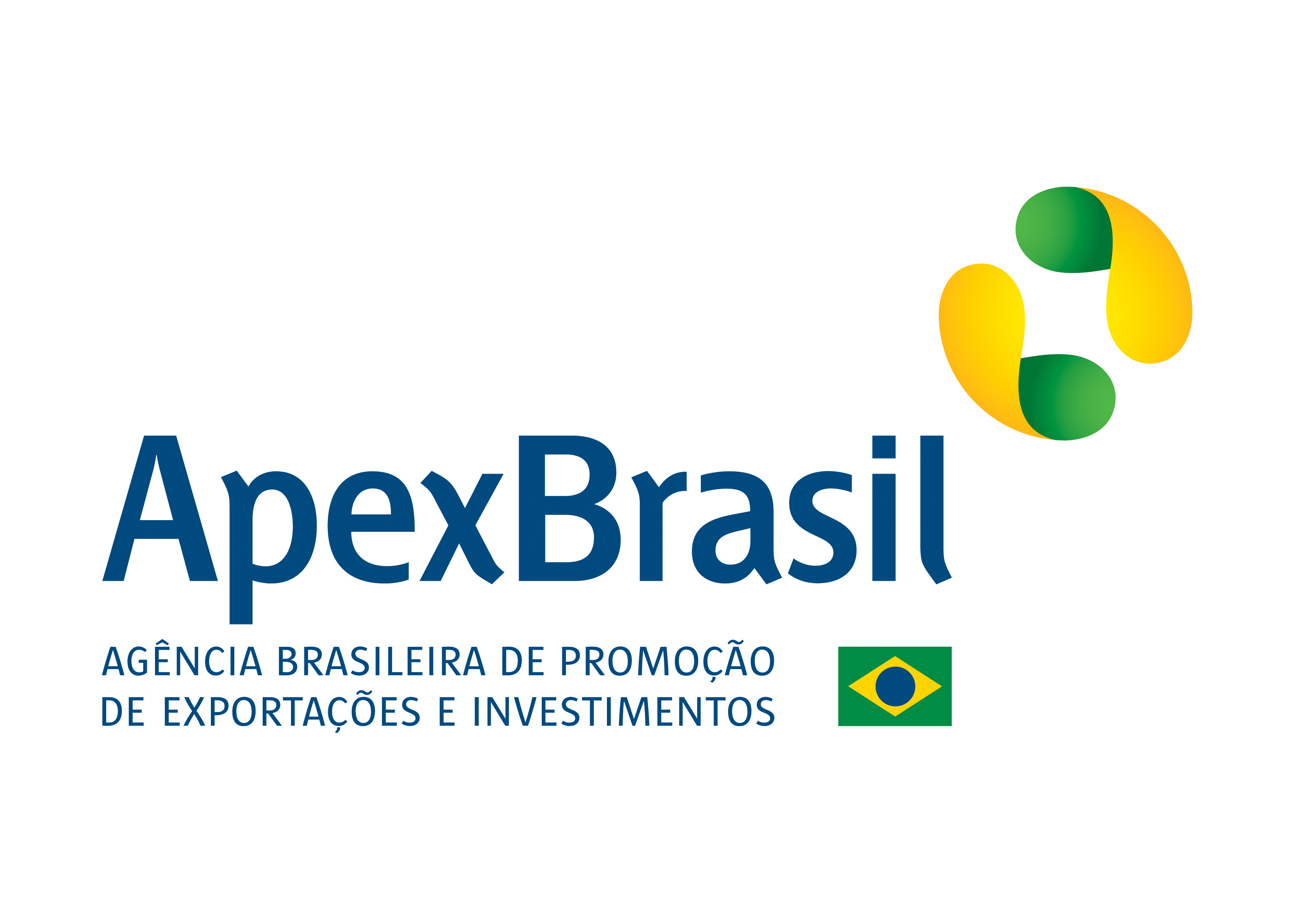

Agency overview
- Formed: 21 November 1997
- Headquarters: Brasília
- Employees: 360
- Annual budget: BRL 1.25 billion (circa USD 200 million) (2022 FY)
- Agency executives: Mauro Vieira, Chairman; Jorge Viana, CEO
- Parent agency: Ministry of Foreign Affairs
- Website: http://www.apexbrasil.com.br

The Brazilian Trade and Investment Promotion Agency, or ApexBrasil (Portuguese: Agência Brasileira de Promoção de Exportações e Investimentos), is both the trade promotion organisation (TPO) and the investment promotion agency (IPA) of Brazil. Founded in 1997 as a subsidiary of the micro- and small business support organisation SEBRAE, ApexBrasil became in 2003 an autonomous non-profit entity funded by the private sector and supervised by the Federal Government of Brazil. Formally linked to the Foreign Ministry since 2016, it promotes Brazilian products and services abroad, attracts foreign direct investment and supports national companies, especially small- and medium-sized, on their international journey.

Through its programmes and services, ApexBrasil supports approximately one third of Brazil's annual exports and contributes to facilitate at least one fourth of its foreign direct investment (FDI) inward flows each year. More than 15 thousand Brazilian companies are directly supported by the agency, virtually all of them micro-, small- or medium-sized.

== History ==
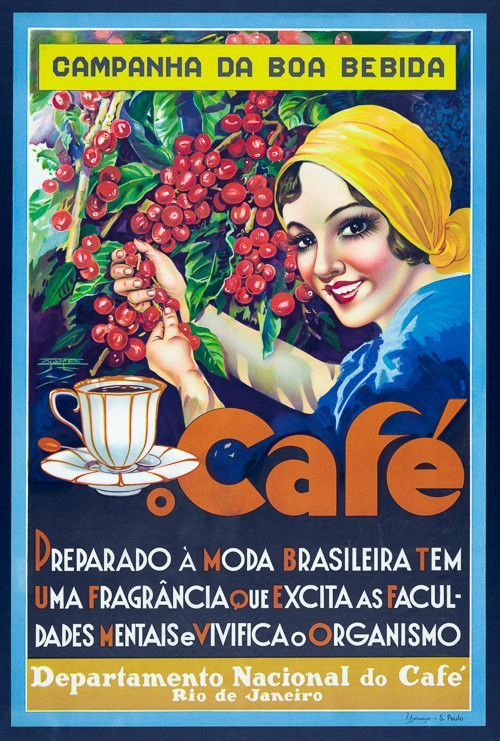
A 1930s poster promoting Brazilian coffee.

Brazil's trade promotion activities have been historically a task of the Foreign Service, stretching back to the 1834, 1847 and 1872 editions of the Imperial Consular Handbook, which pioneered marketing techniques and concepts such as business intelligence and advocacy. As coffee prevailed as the country's main export for at least a century (from the mid-19th century to the early 1960s), promotion activities were mostly aimed at the trading of that commodity, especially after the adoption of interventionist measures in the early 1900s by national and subnational governments, led by the states of São Paulo and Minas Gerais. In the 1930s, these activities included the operation of high-end coffeehouses to promote the Brazilian product and the cafezinho culture, such as the Café do Brasil (1934–40) in the central Ginza district of Tokyo, decorated with custom murals by great Japanese painter Tsuguharu Foujita.

Following the industrialisation process in the mid-20th century and the diversification of the Brazilian economic base during the governments of presidents Getúlio Vargas and Juscelino Kubitschek, a modern and result-oriented trade and investment promotion system was conceived and implemented in the early 1970s by ambassador Paulo Tarso Flecha de Lima, including the establishment of a network of trade bureaus in Embassies and Consulates located in major markets. The system devised by Flecha de Lima at the Foreign Ministry lost momentum in the 1990s due to budget constraints and to the lack of a consistent national trade policy strategy, linking free trade negotiations, FDI attraction and export promotion.

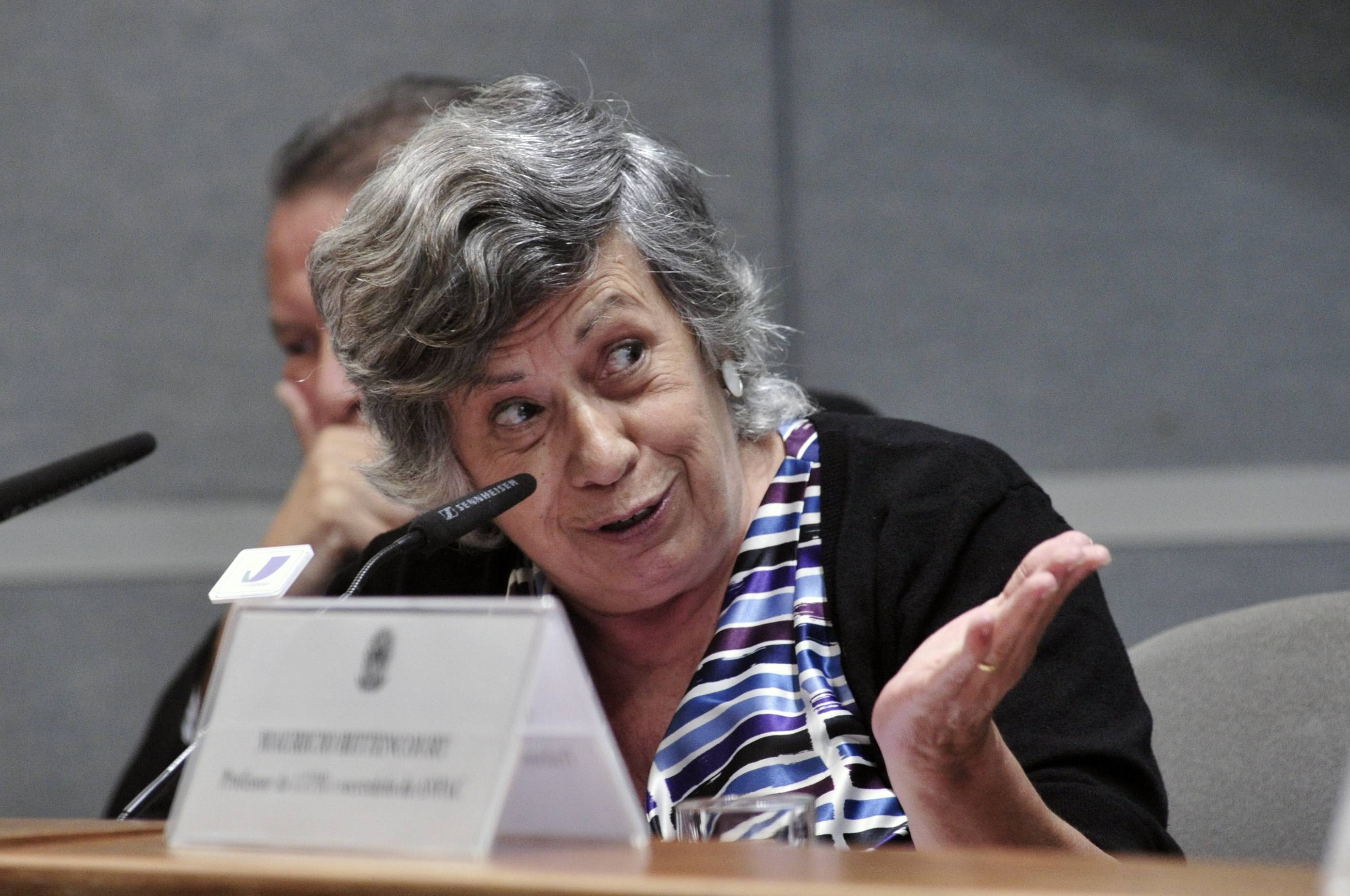
Minister Dorothea Werneck, main developer of Apex-Brasil.

In 1995, industry and trade minister Dorothea Werneck advocated an approach focused on the export potential of micro, small and medium-sized companies. In 1997, a new agency, Apex, was created by president Fernando Henrique Cardoso as part of the SEBRAE system. In 2003, development minister Luiz Fernando Furlan, one of the country's top business leaders, expanded the attributions of the agency, now called ApexBrasil, and led its transformation into an autonomous non-profit entity funded entirely by the private sector (through a fixed grant of 12.5% of the SEBRAE annual revenue).

In 2016, under the leadership of foreign minister José Serra, former governor of São Paulo, the agency was officially placed under the supervision of the Foreign Ministry, which chairs the Governing Board. ApexBrasil's strategic vision for 2020–2023 attaches priority to the full planning and operational integration with the trade and investment promotion activities of the Brazilian Foreign Service.

== Corporate governance and structure ==
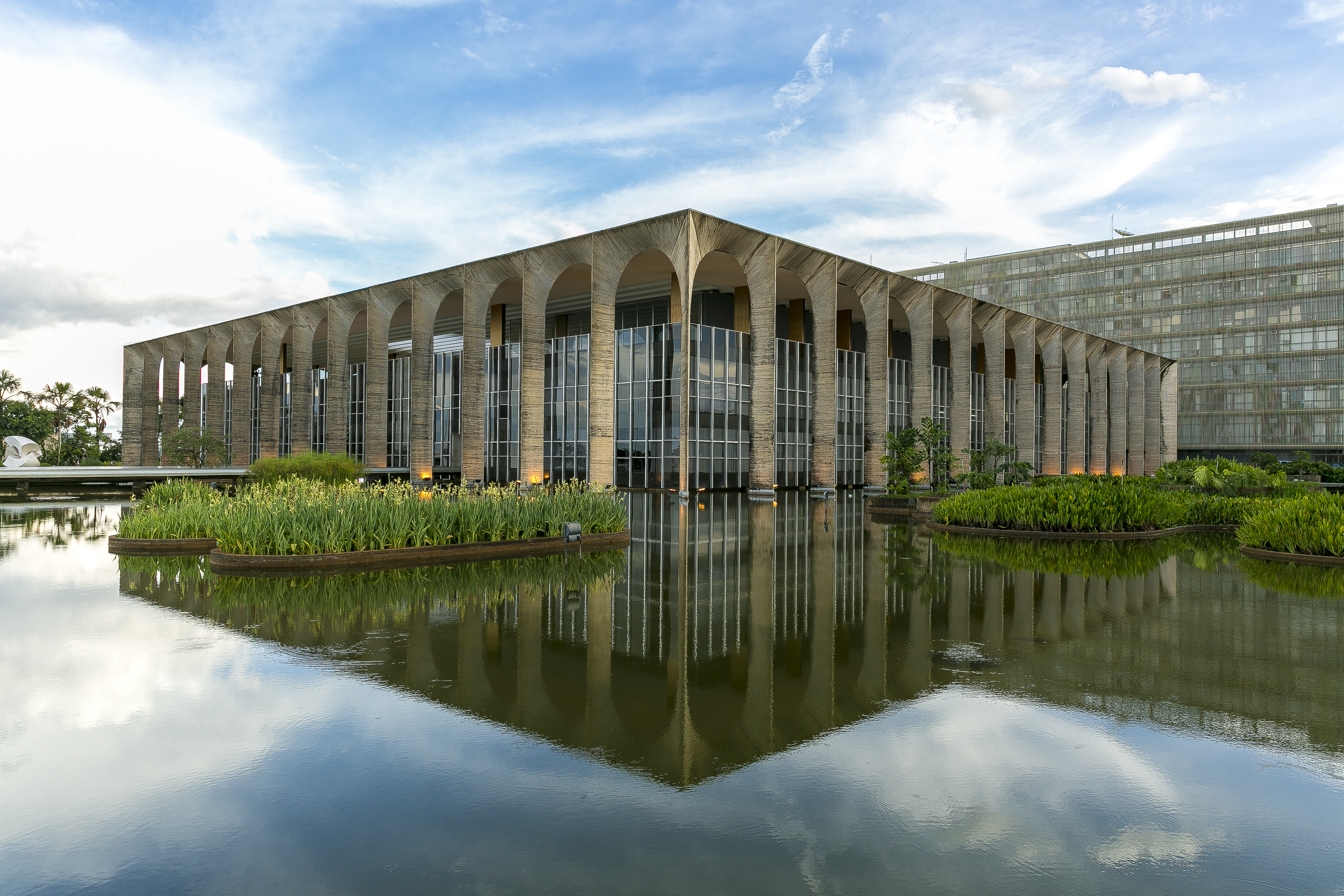
The Brazilian Foreign Ministry has ApexBrasil in its portfolio.

Under Federal Law 10668/2003 and Presidential Decree 4584/2003 (substantially amended in 2016), ApexBrasil's corporate structure is composed by three main bodies: the Governing Board, the Managing Board and the Audit Committee.

The Governing Board is entrusted with the strategic leadership and overall direction of the agency. Chaired by the foreign minister, it brings together five representatives from the public sector (Ministries of Foreign Affairs, Economy and Agriculture, the Special Secretariat for the Programme of Partnerships for Investments and the National Social and Economic Development Bank) and four from the private sector (SEBRAE, National Industry Confederation, National Agriculture Confederation and the Brazilian Exporters Association). The National Foreign Trade Chamber (CAMEX) is represented by a non-voting member.

The Managing Board is the executive and operational body of ApexBrasil. It is headed by a chief executive officer, appointed by the president of Brazil, and also integrated by two statutory directors, a chief business officer and a chief operation officer, both appointed by the Managing Board.

The Audit Committee is composed by representatives appointed by SEBRAE and by the Ministries of Foreign Affairs and the Economy. It analyses and supervises the financial statements and reports of the Agency.

Headquartered in Brasília at the Trade National Confederation business complex, ApexBrasil has a network of four regional offices (São Paulo, Porto Alegre, Recife and Belém) and nine international hubs (Beijing, Bogotá, Brussels, Dubai, Jerusalem, Miami, Moscow, San Francisco and Shanghai). The agency works in close coordination and partnership with the network of Brazilian Foreign Service posts, especially those with trade promotion sections, thus reaching priority markets around the globe.

== Regional offices and international hubs ==
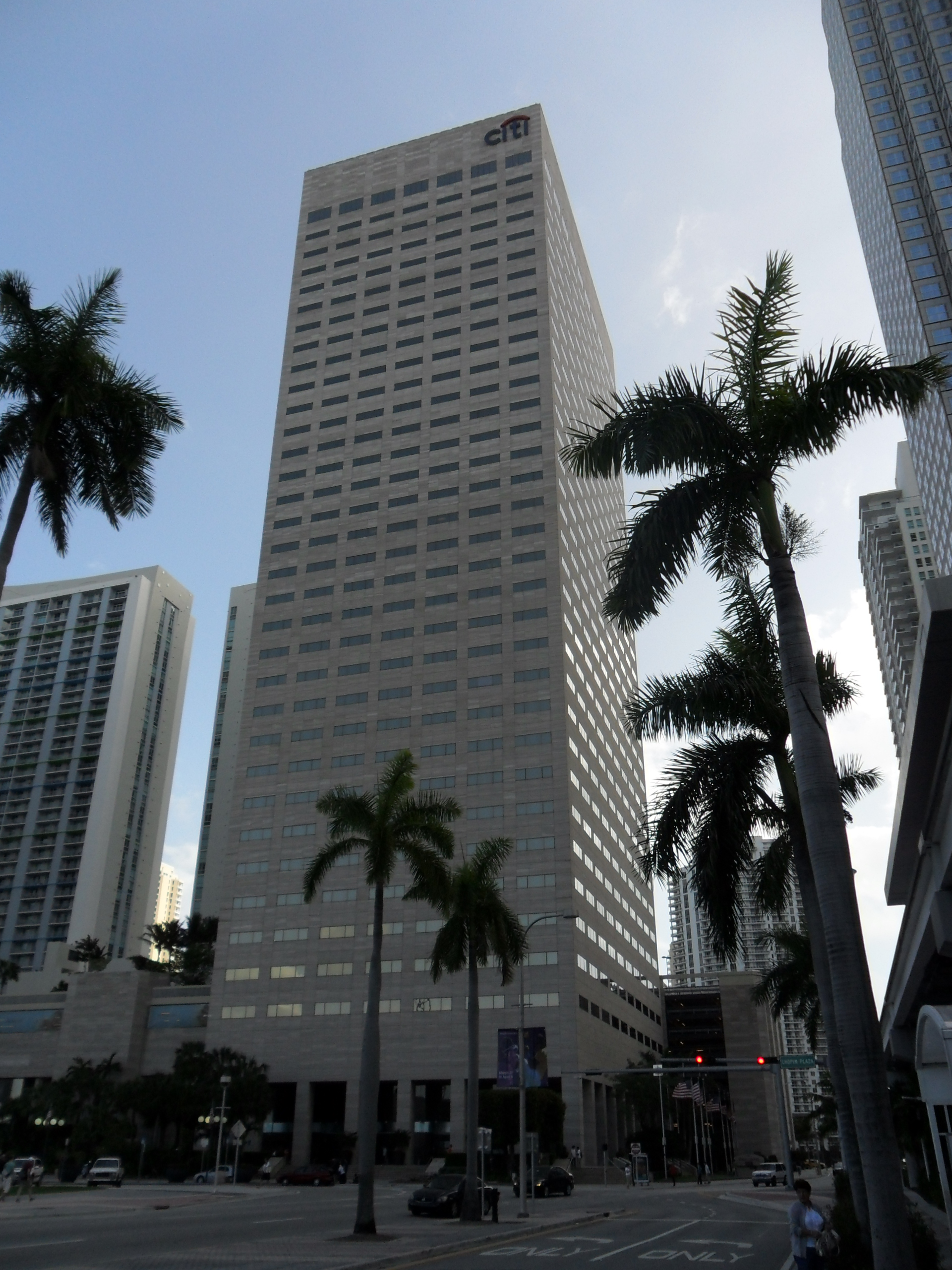
Miami Center, where Apex-Brasil has its HQ for Central and North America.

Brazil

- Belém, Pará (North Region)
- Brasília, Federal District (National HQ and Central-West Region)
- Porto Alegre, Rio Grande do Sul (South Region)
- Recife, Pernambuco (Northeast Region)
- São Paulo, São Paulo (Southeast Region)

Americas

- Bogotá, Colombia (South America)
- Miami, United States of America (Central and North America)
- San Francisco, United States of America (Start-ups and IT)

Asia-Pacific, Africa, Middle East and Russia

- Beijing, China (Chinese mainland)
- Dubai, United Arab Emirates (Middle East and Africa)
- Jerusalem, Israel (Start-ups and IT)
- Moscow, Russia (Russia and Central Asia)
- Shanghai, China (East Asia, ASEAN and Pacific)

Europe

- Brussels, Belgium (European Union and EFTA)

== Programmes and services ==
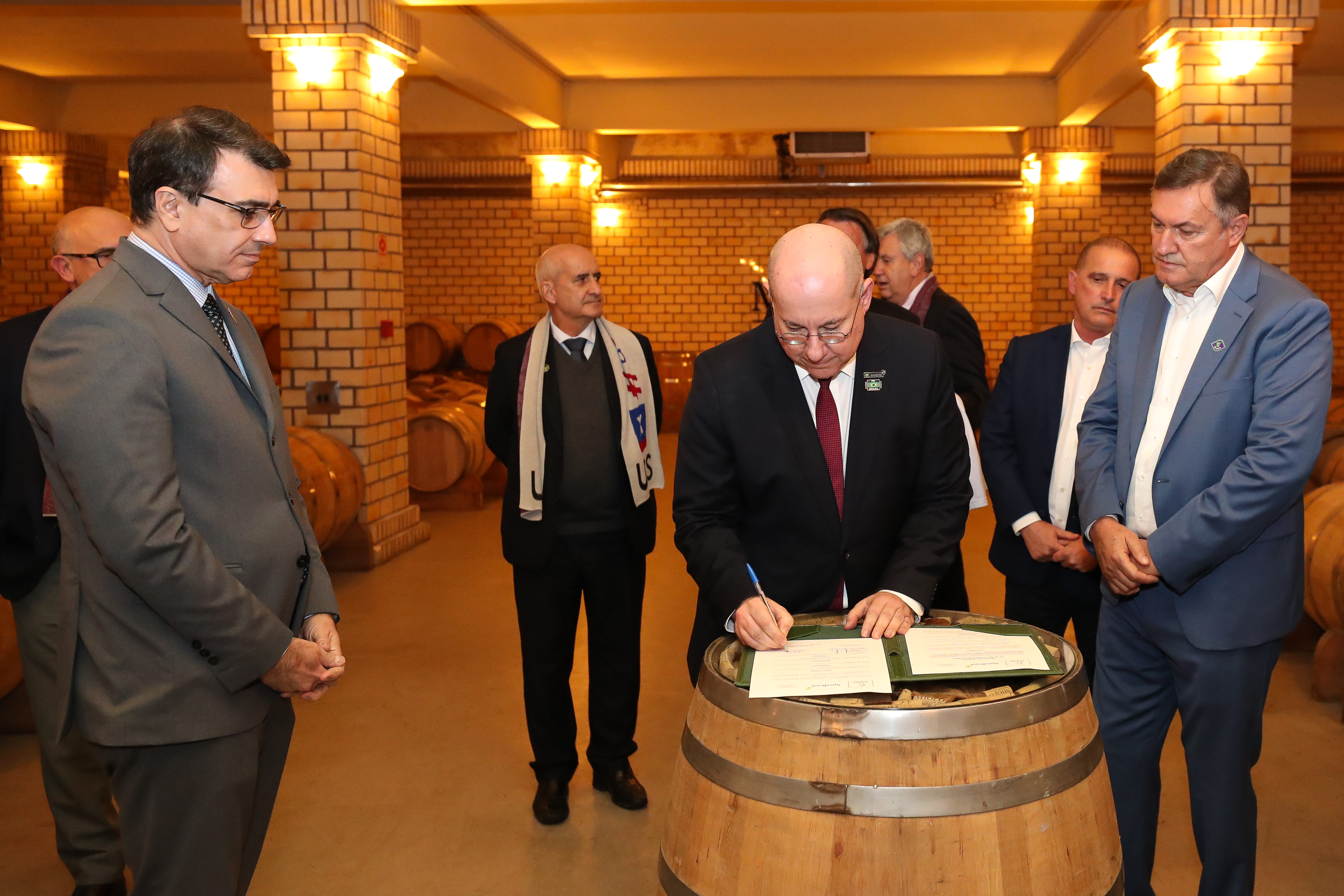
Signing of the 2021 Bento Gonçalves protocol to promote Brazil's winemaking industry.

To achieve its goals, ApexBrasil performs a range of trade promotion activities aimed at fostering exports and adding value to Brazilian products and services abroad, either directly or through special partnerships with associations representing specific sectors of Brazil's industry, agribusiness and services. These efforts comprise prospective trade missions, digital business rounds, support for the participation of Brazilian companies in major international trade fairs, arrangement of technical visits of foreign buyers and opinion makers to learn about the domestic productive structure, and other select activities designed to strengthen the country's branding abroad.

The agency employs a vast array of strategies to promote the competitiveness of Brazilian companies during their internationalisation process. The services offered by ApexBrasil to companies aiming to enter global markets include market intelligence and research, international business training, export capacity building and branding services.

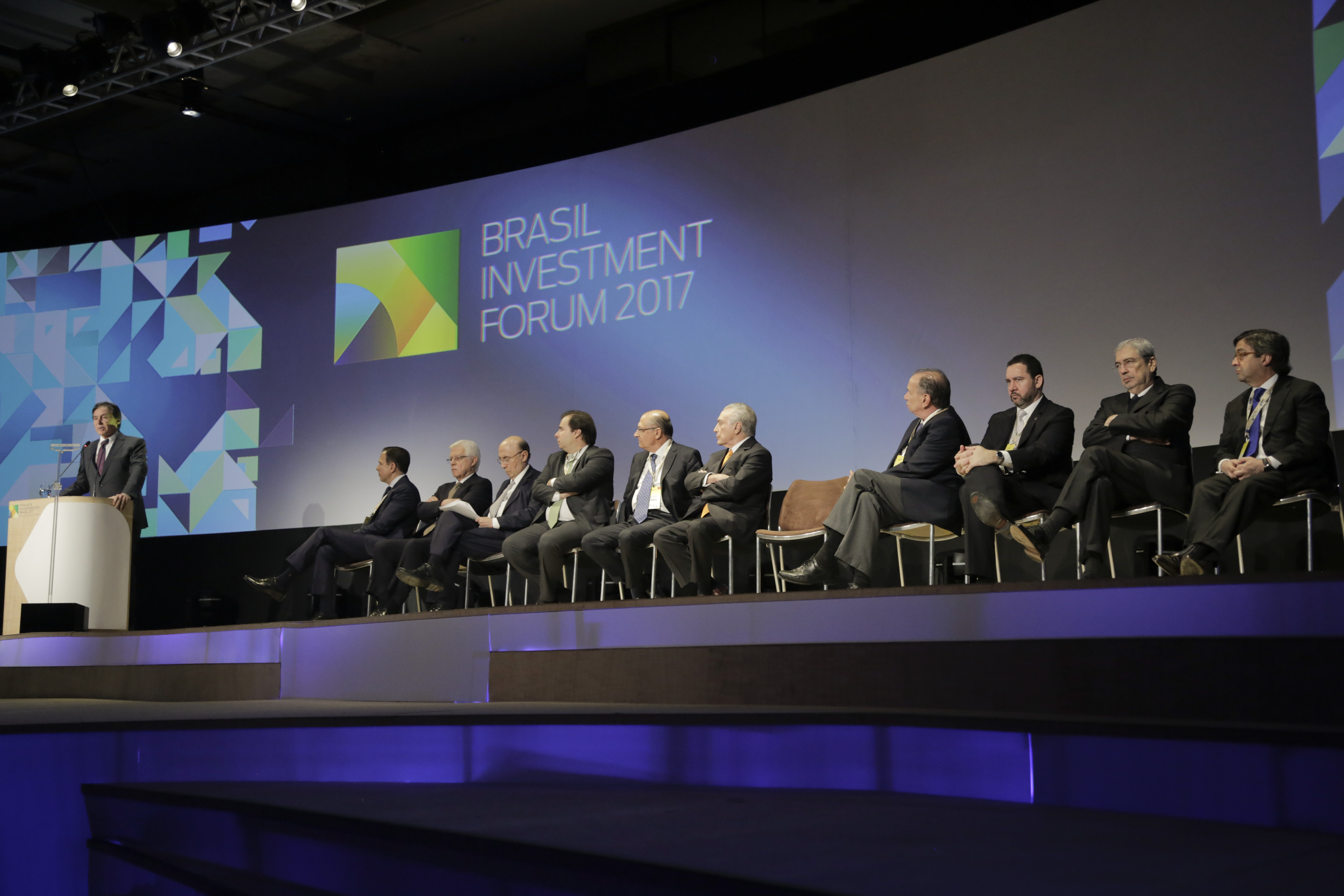
Brasil Investment Forum 2017.

ApexBrasil also plays a leading role in attracting foreign direct investment (FDI) to Brazil. It identifies business opportunities, promotes networking events and offers strategic advice to foreign investors. Additionally, investment attraction initiatives are designed to encourage the transfer of innovative technologies to Brazilian companies. During the COVID-19 pandemic, ApexBrasil was recognised by the United Nations Conference on Trade and Development (UNCTAD) as a model IPA and TPO for its quick response to the crisis, especially through a robust update of its online platforms that provide tools to support exporters and investors. According to UNCTAD, the agency swiftly launched an exclusive area on its digital portal "with pandemic-related information for foreign investors in English, (…) and actively engaged in online investment promotion events".

Since 2017, the agency organises an annual FDI summit, the Brasil Investment Forum (BIF), bringing together key authorities and foreign investors, highlighting major investment opportunities in the country, supporting investment promotion efforts of the subnational governments and addressing business climate concerns. The 2021 edition of the BIF, held entirely on a digital format, had more than 6 thousand participants, representing 102 countries and including at least 800 C-level foreign executives. ApexBrasil gives support to other organizations as well, like to the implementation of its Surinamese equivalent Suriname Investment and Trade Agency (SITA), when that was founded.

== World Expos ==
At the behest of the Federal Government, ApexBrasil was responsible for Brazil's participation (construction and operation of the national pavilion) in the World Expos of Shanghai (2010) and Milan (2015). The agency has also been designated at the Bureau International des Expositions as the national authority for the Expo 2020. The Brazilian pavilion in Dubai, designed by the JPG Architects, MMBB and Ben-Avid firms, comprises a central square covered in a thin layer of water and enclosed by giant screens with 140 mega projectors, showing a journey through Brazil's regions and highlighting its sustainable development. The complex includes a four-storey building inspired by Brazilian modern architecture, housing an exhibition hall, a gallery, a restaurant devoted to Brazilian regional gastronomy and a shop.

Brazil has been an active participant in World Expos since the Great Exhibition of London in 1851. Foreign minister José Paranhos, Baron of Rio Branco (1845–1912), founding father of modern Brazilian diplomacy, was personally involved in the country's presence in the 1884 International Exhibition of Saint Petersburg and especially in the 1889 Exposition Universelle of Paris.

== List of agency heads ==
term	CEO
1997–1999	José Frederico Álvares
1999–2003	Dorothea Werneck
2003–2007	Juan Quirós
2007–2011	Alessandro Golombiewski Teixeira
2011–2015	Maurício Borges
2015–2016	David Barioni Neto
2016–2019	Roberto Jaguaribe
2019	Mário Vilalva
2019–2021	Sérgio Segovia
2021–2023	Augusto Pestana
2023–	Jorge Viana
