= Modesto Carone =

Brazilian writer and translator (1937–2019)

Modesto Carone (1937–2019) was a Brazilian writer and translator. He was born in Sorocaba, and completed his bachelor's degree at the Faculty of Law of Largo São Francisco (Law School, University of São Paulo) in the early 1960s. He moved to Austria in 1965, where he taught Brazilian language and culture at the University of Vienna. On his return to Brazil, a few years later, he obtained a doctorate in Germanic letters from the University of São Paulo, and eventually became a professor there.

His literary debut occurred with As Marcas no Real (1979), and two years later Carone began his career at the Institute of Letters of the State University of Campinas (Unicamp), where he remained for 15 years. From 2000, he worked as a visiting professor at the Department of Literary Theory at the Faculty of Letters at USP.

Carone is best known for being the premier translator of Franz Kafka into Brazilian Portuguese language. He began the task with Metamorphosis in 1983, and completed translating the Czech writer's oeuvre in 2002. He also won renown for his own original work, notably winning the Premio Jabuti for the novel Resumos de Ana (1998), and the APCA 2009 award for best essay/criticism with Kafka's Lesson.
