= Prêmio ABL de Poesia =

- Description: Best book of poetry published in Brazil
- Presented by: Academia Brasileira de Letras (ABL)
- Website: www.academia.org.br

The Prêmio ABL de Poesia (ABL Award for Poetry) is a literary award bestowed annually by the Brazilian Academy of Letters upon the author of the best book of poetry published that year.

The prize was preceded by the Prêmio Olavo Bilac, which was established in 1911 and last awarded in 1994.

== Awardees ==
- 2014 - Gabriel Nascente for A biografia da cinza
- 2013 - Antonio Cícero for Porventura
- 2012 - Manoel de Barros for Escritos em verbal de ave
- 2011 - Salgado Maranhão for A cor da palavra
- 2010 - Ronaldo Costa Fernandes for A máquina das mãos
- 2009 - Denise Emmer for Lamparádio
- 2008 - Izacyl Guimarães Ferreira for Discurso urbano
- 2007 - Alberto da Cunha Melo for O cão dos olhos amarelos
- 2007 - Adriano Espínola for Praia provisória
- 2006 - Ruy Pinheiro Filho for Elegia de agosto e outros poemas
- 2005 - Neide Archanjo for Todas as horas e antes
- 2005 - Vera Lucia de Oliveira for A chuva dos ruídos
- 2004 - Astrid Cabral for Raso d'água
- 2004 - Alexei Bueno for Poesia reunida
- 2004 - Fabrício Carpinejar for Biografia de uma árvore
- 2003 - Antonio Carlos Secchin for Todos os ventos
- 2002 - Afonso Félix de Souza for Chamados e escolhidos
- 2002 - Fernando Ferreira de Loanda for O signo da serpente
- 2001 - Luiz de Miranda for Trilogia do azul do mar da madrugada e da ventania
- 2000 - Dora Ferreira da Silva for Poesia reunida
- 2000 - Moacyr Scliar for Singular plural
- 1999 - Nauro Machado for Antologia poética
