= Vicente Ferreira da Silva =

Brazilian logician

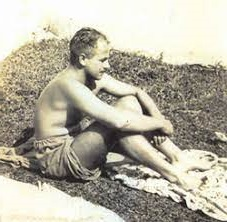
- Relaxing in the Sun
- Born: January 10, 1916; São Paulo, State of São Paulo, Brazil
- Died: July 19, 1963 (aged 47); São Paulo, State of São Paulo, Brazil
- Occupations: Philosopher, logician, and mathematician
- Spouse: Dora Ferreira da Silva

Academic background
- Education: Law School, University of São Paulo
- Influences: Plato, Schelling, Heidegger, Nietzsche, Quine, Novalis, Böhme, Lavelle, Eliot

Academic work
- Main interests: Art, mathematics, mythology, logic
- Notable works: Dialética das consciências (1950)
- Notable ideas: Rediscovery of myth
- Influenced: Reale, Rosa, Flusser, da Costa, de Andrade

Vicente Ferreira da Silva (10 January 1916 – 19 July 1963) was a Brazilian logician, mathematician, and philosopher. He was among the first in Brazil to write and publish academic books on Logic and Phenomenology, with a special interest in Heidegger.

== Biography ==
Ferreira was an assistant to Willard Van Orman Quine. Ferreira sought to develop a systematic foundational philosophy based on Heidegger's work and Schelling's philosophy of mythology. Vicente founded a form of neopaganism.

During his life, Vicente kept in touch and influenced thinkers like João Guimarães Rosa, Agostinho da Silva, Oswald de Andrade, Julian Marias, Miguel Reale, Saint-John Perse and Vilém Flusser, who said that Vicente was the only and greatest philosopher in the history of Brazil.

He died in 1963 in a car accident.

== Partial bibliography ==
- Modern Logic (1939)
- Elements of Mathematical Logic (1940)
- Philosophical Essays (1948)
- Exegesis of the Action (1949 and 1954)
- Ideas for a New Concept of Man (1951)
- Theology and Anti-Humanism (1953)
- Instruments, Things and Culture (1958)
- Dialectics of the Consciences (1950)
- Dialectics of the Consciences - Complete Works (2009)
- Symbolic Logic - Complete Works (2009)
- Transcendence of the World - Complete Works (2010)
