= Câmara Brasileira do Livro =

- Abbreviation: CBL
- Formation: September 20, 1946; 80 years ago
- Type: nonprofit trade association
- Headquarters: São Paulo, Brazil
- President: Sevani Matos
- Website: https://cbl.org.br/

Câmara Brasileira do Livro (English: Brazilian Book Chamber; CBL) is a non-profit trade association of the Brazilian publishing industry, whose purpose is "to promote access to books and the democratization of reading throughout the country, as well as to disseminate Brazilian literature in the international market." CBL is responsible for annually awarding the Prêmio Jabuti and for organizing the São Paulo International Book Fair (Bienal Internacional do Livro de São Paulo). The association also runs the Brazilian Publishers project, in partnership with ApexBrasil, aimed at fostering the export of Brazilian literature abroad.

== History ==
Câmara Brasileira do Livro was founded on September 20, 1946, during a meeting held at the Livraria O Pensamento bookstore in downtown São Paulo. Its origins trace back to the cultural effervescence of São Paulo in the 1940s, when a group of publishers and booksellers began meeting to discuss the sector's challenges and seek ways to act collectively and in an organized manner. The entity's first advertising campaign, also launched in 1946, was titled "Livro, presente de amigo" ("A Book, a Gift from a Friend").

Throughout its history, the CBL has created and continues to maintain some of the most important initiatives in the Brazilian publishing sector. In 1959, it held the first edition of the Prêmio Jabuti, an award that annually recognizes authors, publishers, and other book professionals. The association also organizes the São Paulo International Book Fair (Bienal Internacional do Livro de São Paulo), an event that has become the largest literary gathering in the country.

In 2020, the CBL became the Brazilian ISBN Agency, the institution authorized to issue the International Standard Book Number in Brazil. On the international front, the entity runs the Brazilian Publishers project in partnership with the Brazilian Trade and Investment Promotion Agency (ApexBrasil), with the aim of fostering the export of Brazilian literature.

The CBL also engages with public and governmental entities on matters related to the book production chain. Among its activities is the publication of annual studies on the book market, including the Production and Sales Surveys of the Brazilian Publishing Sector and the Digital Content of the Brazilian Publishing Sector, which provide data on the industry's performance. The CBL has also implemented projects such as "Retomada das Livrarias" (Bookstore Recovery), aimed at supporting small bookstores, and "Conexão Livraria," a program designed to assist small and medium-sized bookstores with e-commerce operations. The latter received the Innovation Award at the 33rd International Publishers Association (IPA) Congress in 2022.

== See also ==
- American Booksellers Association
- Börsenverein des Deutschen Buchhandels
