= Alexei Bueno =

Brazilian poet (1963–2026)

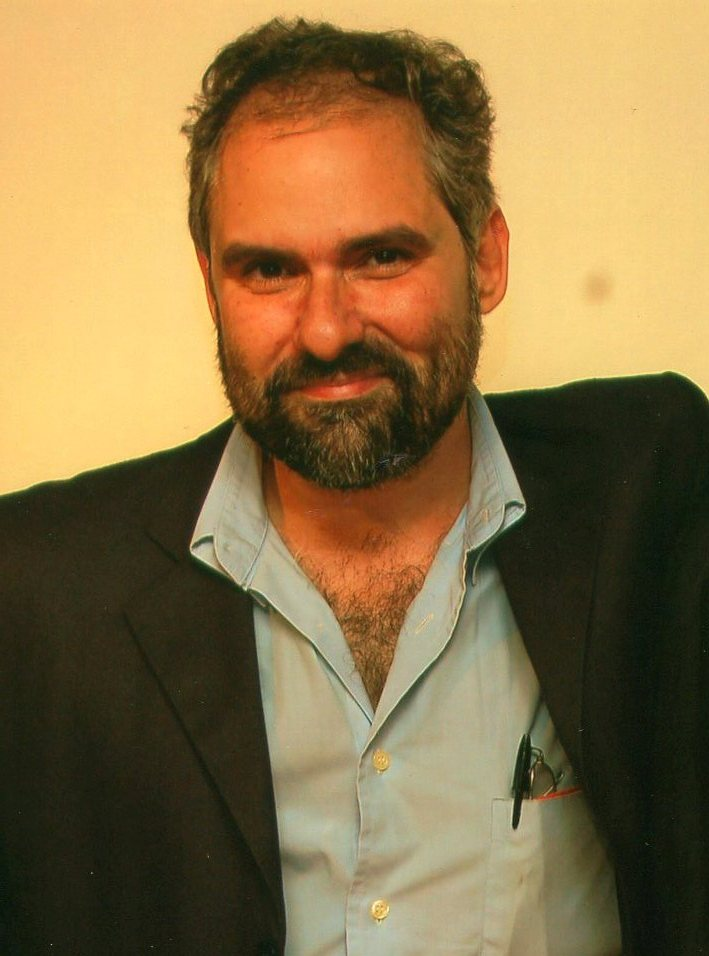
Alexei Bueno

Alexei Bueno (April 26, 1963 – June 27, 2026) was a Brazilian poet from Rio de Janeiro.

== Life and career ==
Alexei Bueno was born on April 26, 1963.

As curator, he organized more than eighty exhibitions on fine arts or on the history of literature. As editor, he published many selected or complete works of great classics of the Portuguese language, such as Camões, Fernando Pessoa, Mário de Sá-Carneiro, Almada Negreiros, Gonçalves Dias, Álvares de Azevedo, Machado de Assis, Cruz e Sousa, Olavo Bilac, Alphonsus de Guimaraens, Augusto dos Anjos (a complete critical edition), and Vinicius de Moraes.

He was, between 1999 and 2002, director of the Institute of the Cultural Heritage of Rio de Janeiro (INEPAC). He was also a member of PEN Club of Brazil.

Bueno died from cancer in Rio de Janeiro, on June 27, 2026, at the age of 63.

== Works ==
- As escadas da torre (The stairs of the tower), 1984
- Poemas gregos (Greek poems), 1985
- Livro de haicais (Book of haikais), 1989
- A decomposição de J. S. Bach (The decomposition of J. S. Bach), 1989
- Lucernário (Lucernarium), 1993
- Grandes poemas do Romantismo brasileiro (Great poems of the Brazilian Romanticism), 1994
- A via estreita (The narrow way), 1995 – Alphonsus de Guimaraens Prize, by the National Library, and APCA Prize
- A juventude dos deuses (The youngness of the gods), 1996
- Entusiasmo (Enthusiasm), 1997
- Poemas reunidos (Collected poems), 1998 – Fernando Pessoa Prize
- Em sonho (In dream), 1999
- Antologia da poesia portuguesa contemporânea, um panorama, (Anthology of the contemporary Portuguese poetry, a survey), with Alberto da Costa e Silva, 1999
- Os resistentes (The insurgents), 2001
- Gamboa (2002), in the collection Cantos do Rio (Places of Rio)
- O patrimônio construído (The building heritage), 2002, with Augusto Carlos da Silva Teles and Lauro Cavalcanti – Jabuti Prize
- La poésie romantique brésilienne, 2002
- Glauber Rocha, mais fortes são os poderes do povo! (Glauber Rocha, strongest are the powers of the people!), 2003
- Poesia reunida (Collected poetry), 2003 – Jabuti Prize, ABL Prize
- O Brasil do século XIX na Coleção Fadel (The 19th Century Brazil in the Fadel Collection), 2004
- Antologia pornográfica (Pornographic anthology), 2004
- A árvore seca (The dry tree), 2006
- O Nordeste e a epopeia nacional (The Northeast and the national epic), 2006 – Aula Magna at the Rio Grande do Norte's University
- Uma história da poesia brasileira (A history of Brazilian poetry), 2007
- As desaparições (The disappearances), 2009
- Sergio Telles, caminhos da cor (Sergio Telles, the paths of colour), 2009
- João Tarcísio Bueno, o herói de Abetaia (João Tarcísio Bueno, the hero of Abetaia), 2010
- Lixo extraordinário (Waste Land), with Vik Muniz, 2010
- O universo de Francisco Brennand ( The universe of Francisco Brennand), 2011
- Machado, Euclides & outros monstros (Machado, Euclides & other monsters), 2012
- Cinco séculos de poesia: poemas traduzidos (Five centuries of Poetry: translated poems), 2013
- São Luís, 400 anos, Patrimônio da Humanidade (São Luís, 400 years, Humanity Heritage), 2013
- Poesia completa (Complete poems), 2013
- Palácios da Borracha, arquitetura da Belle Époque amazônica (The rubber palaces, architecture from the Amazonian Belle Époque), 2014
- Os monumentos do Rio de Janeiro, inventário 2015 (The Rio de Janeiro monuments, 2015 inventory), 2015
- Alcoofilia, 5.000 anos de declarações de amor à bebida ('Alcohophilia, 5,000 years of love declarations to liquor), 2015
- Rio Belle Époque, álbum de imagens (Río Belle Époque, pictorial album), 2015
- Anamnese (Anamnese), 2016
- Desaparições (Disappearances), a Portuguese anthology
- O poste (The stake), drama in two acts, 2018.
- Les résistants, full French translation of the poem, by Didier Lamaison, in Courage! Dix variations sur le courage et un chant de résistance. (2020)
- Decálogo indigno para os mortos de 2020 (Unworthy decalogue for the dead of 2020, poems about coronavirus pandemic), 2020
- O Sono dos Humildes (The sleep of the humble, poems), 2021 – Candango Literature Prize and the National Library's Alphonsus de Guimaraens Prize
- A escravidão na poesia brasileira: Do século XVII ao XXI (Slavery in Brazilian Poetry: From the 17th to the 21st Century, anthology of poems about slavery in Brazil), 2022
- A noite assediada (The haunted night, poems in prose), 2022
- Rio de Janeiro en couleurs et en relief: À Travers Les Photos Du Voyage En Amerique Du Sud D'Albert Kahn (Rio de Janeiro in color and relief: Through Photos from Albert Kahn's South American Trip, French edition), 2022, with Delphine Allannic, Laurent Vidal and Mélanie Moreau
- Poesia completa e traduzida (Complete original and translated poems), 2023
- Bibliografia crítica da Lapa (Critical bibliography of Lapa), 2023
- Cândido Torres Guimarães: Um combatente brasileiro na Primeira Grande Guerra (Cândido Torres Guimarães: A Brazilian fighter in the First World War), 2023.
- Camões: Em nós, por nós (Camões: In us, for us, commemorative poem for the 500th anniversary of the birth of the Portuguese epic poet Camões) – 2024
- Naquele Remoto Agora (In That Remote Now, poems), 2024
