= Isa Silveira Leal =

Brazilian writer (1910–1988)

- Born: Isa Silveira Leal; 20 February 1910; Santos, São Paulo, Brazil
- Died: 5 April 1988 (aged 78); São Paulo, Brazil
- Occupations: Writer, journalist, poet, translator
- Spouse: Alberto Antônio Leal (1908–1948)
- Writing career
- Pen name: Isa Leal
- Notable works: Glorinha, O menino de Palmares, O único amor de Ana Maria
- Notable awards: Prêmio Jabuti (1959,1962,1969)

Isa Silveira Leal (20 February 1910 – 5 April 1988), also known as Isa Leal, was a Brazilian writer, poet, journalist and novelist (for radio and television). She won the Jabuti Award on three occasions and the best poetry book prize from the São Paulo Association of Art Critics.

== Career ==
Isa Leal began her career as a book translator and translated texts by William Shakespeare, Pearl S. Buck and André Gide. She worked as a journalist for over 20 years at Folha de São Paulo.

In 1948, Leal started working at Difusora Radio Station, as a producer. She wrote her first novel in 1956, with the title "A rainha do rádio".

She won the Jabuti Award on three occasions: In 1959 with "Glorinha", in 1962 with "O único amor de Ana Maria" and in 1969 with "O menino de Palmares". The book "O pescador vai ao mar" won the best poetry book prize in 1987 from the São Paulo Association of Art Critics.

== Personal life ==
Isa Leal was born in Santos, São Paulo on 20 February 1910. She was the only daughter of the couple of writers Valdomiro Silveira and Maria Isabel Silveira.

Leal was married to the well-known physician and writer Alberto Leal.

== Works ==
Selected works include:

- A rainha do rádio (The Queen of the radio) – 1956
- Glorinha – 1958
- O menino de Palmares (The boy from Palmares) – 1971
- O único amor de Ana Maria (The only love of Ana Maria) – 1961
- Glorinha e a quermesse (Glorinha and the kirmess) – 1972
- Glorinha e o Mar (Glorinha and the ocean) – 1973
- Elas liam romances policiais (They read detective novels) – 1973
- Sem cachimbo nem boné (Without a pipe or cap) – 1977
- Mistério na morada do sol (Mystery at the Sun's Abode) – 1982
- O Barco e a Estrela (The boat and the star) – 1983
