= Daniel Kondo =

Brazilian author and illustrator

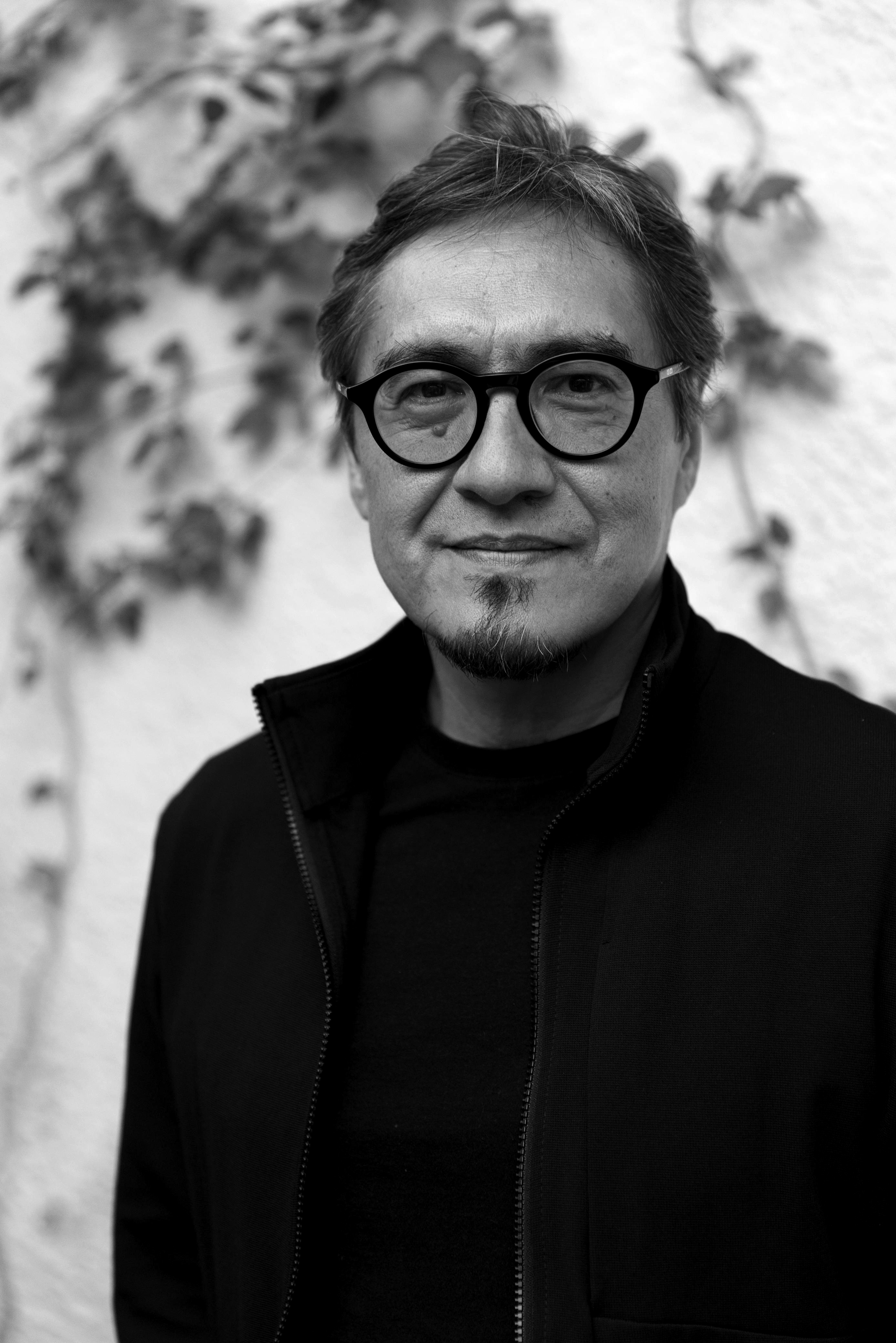
- Kondo in 2025
- Occupations: Author, illustrator and graphic designer
- Website: www.kondoestudio.com

Daniel Kondo is a Brazilian author, illustrator and graphic designer whose work includes picture books, editorial design and illustrated books based on Brazilian popular music. He received the 2022 Jabuti Prize for Children's Literature with writer Silvana Tavano for Sonhozzz.

== Career ==
Kondo was born in Passo Fundo, in the Brazilian state of Rio Grande do Sul. He began working in graphic design and advertising and later moved into editorial publishing and illustration. A profile in GZH described his work as including books published in Brazil, the United States, Japan, and Europe.

According to Gama, Kondo worked as an art director in advertising before turning to editorial publishing, and served for thirteen years as art director of the Brazilian edition of Le Monde diplomatique. The magazine has also reported on his illustrations for the World Press Cartoon.

Kondo has collaborated with Brazilian musician Gilberto Gil on illustrated books and visual projects connected with Gil's music. In 2023, he presented an exhibition of illustrations based on Gil's songs in Rome. Their collaboration has included Nós, a gente and Andar com Fé, among other books.

== Critical reception and academic studies ==
Several of Kondo's books have been discussed in criticism and academic writing about picture books, illustration, graphic design and the materiality of books.

A review of Sonhozzz by Renata Rossi in the Brazilian publication Lunetas said that the interaction between text and image invites the reader to participate in the narrative. Rossi also discussed Kondo's geometric forms and the placement of eyes at the centre of the pages as visual elements connected with the book's treatment of dreams.

In an article in the literary magazine Quatro Cinco Um, Jaqueline Silva described Kondo's illustrated adaptation of Gilberto Gil's song Sítio do Picapau Amarelo as a visual narrative using colours associated with Brazilian culture and folklore. She also noted that its interactive elements expand the experience of the book as an object.

Reviewing Eletricista, Rita da Costa Aguiar described materiality as a significant element in Kondo's work. She associated the book's visual language with Russian Constructivism and discussed the contrast between tools and electrical energy created by its use of metallic and neon inks.

Monstros do Cinema, created with Augusto Massi, was discussed by Gazeta do Povo as a book combining literature, cinema and graphic design and intended to be read jointly by children and adults.

A chapter by Lilane Maria de Moura Chagas and Caroline Machado in Classics of Children's Literature in Book-Object Format discusses Monstros do Cinema as a book-toy and examines the relationship between its materiality, illustrations and reading experience.

Sandra Trabucco Valenzuela interpreted Monstros do Cinema as a transmedia narrative in a paper published in the proceedings of the XVI International Congress of the Brazilian Association of Comparative Literature.

Lélia de Almeida Arraes Freitas analysed Sonhozzz in a 2026 article in REUNINA – Revista de Educacao e Ensino da UNINA, focusing on the interaction between text, colours, symbols and images in the book's visual language.

Lobo Mau com dor de dente, published in 2024, was reviewed by Guilherme Gontijo Flores for the Fundación Cuatrogatos. The review discusses the book's physical structure as part of its narrative experience. Dirce Waltrick do Amarante's essay in Le Monde diplomatique Brasil argues that the graphic design of the book contributes to the narrative rather than merely illustrating it. The Portuguese newspaper Público also reviewed the book, highlighting the unusual format of its Portuguese edition and the interaction between the book-object and the reader.

== Recognition ==
In 2010, Tchibum!, written by Gustavo Borges and illustrated by Kondo, received a Special Mention in the New Horizons category of the BolognaRagazzi Awards.

Monstros do Cinema, created with Augusto Massi, received the 2017 National Children's and Young People's Book Foundation (FNLIJ) Book-Toy Prize.

Sonhozzz received the 2022 Jabuti Prize for Children's Literature.

In 2023, El rojo orgulloso, illustrated by Kondo, was included in the Bologna Children's Book Fair's BRAW Amazing Bookshelf selection.

In 2025, Lobo Mau com dor de dente placed third in the Aloísio Magalhães Graphic Design category of the literary awards of the Fundação Biblioteca Nacional.

Big Bad Wolf with a Toothache was included in the 2025 shortlist of the Communication Arts Design Competition in the Books category and in the longlist of the World Illustration Awards' Children's Publishing category.
