= Sonia Coutinho =

Brazilian journalist and writer

Sônia Coutinho (1939 – August 24, 2013) was a Brazilian journalist, short story writer and novelist.

The daughter of Nathan Coutinho, a poet, she was born in Itabuna, Bahia and moved to Salvador while still young. She left school at the age of 20, returning later returning to earn a master's degree in Communication Theory. Her first published short stories appeared in the collections Reuniao (Reunion) in 1961 and in Histórias da Bahia e doze Contistas da Bahia (Stories from Bahia and twelve short story writers from Bahia) in 1969. In 1968, she moved to Rio de Janeiro, where she worked as a translator for Reuters and as a contributor to various newspapers. Coutinho also wrote for the magazines Nova and Status.

Her short story Cordelia, a caçadora (Cordelia the huntress) won the Status Prize for erotic literature. It was later included in the collection Os Venenos de Lucrécia (Lucretia's poisons) (1978) which was awarded the Prêmio Jabuti in 1979.

In 1994, she published the critical study Rainhas do Crime Otica Feminina no Romance Policial (Queens of Crime: the Female point-of-view in the detective novel).

Coutinho was Visiting Writer at the University of Texas at Austin and Writer in Residence (International Writing Program) at the University of Iowa. In 1989, she began working as a translator of English literary works into Spanish.

She married the poet and journalist Florisvaldo Mattos; the couple had a daughter but later divorced.

She died in Rio de Janeiro of a heart attack at the age of 74.

== Selected works ==
Sources:

- Do herói inútil: (On the useless hero), short stories (1966)
- Nascimento de uma mulher (Birth of a women), short stories (1971)
- Uma certa felicidade (A certain happiness) (1979)
- O jogo de Ifá (The game of Ifá), novel (1980)
- O último verão de Copacabana (The last Copacabana summer), short stories (1985)
- Atire em Sofia (Shoot Sofia), novel (1989)
- O Caso Alice (The Alice file), novel(1991)
- Os Seios de Pandora (Pandora's breasts), novel (1998), won the Prêmio Jabuti in 1999
- Ovelha Negra e Amiga Loura (Black sheep and blond friend), short stories (2006)
