= Bruno Tolentino =

Brazilian poet and intellectual (1940–2007)

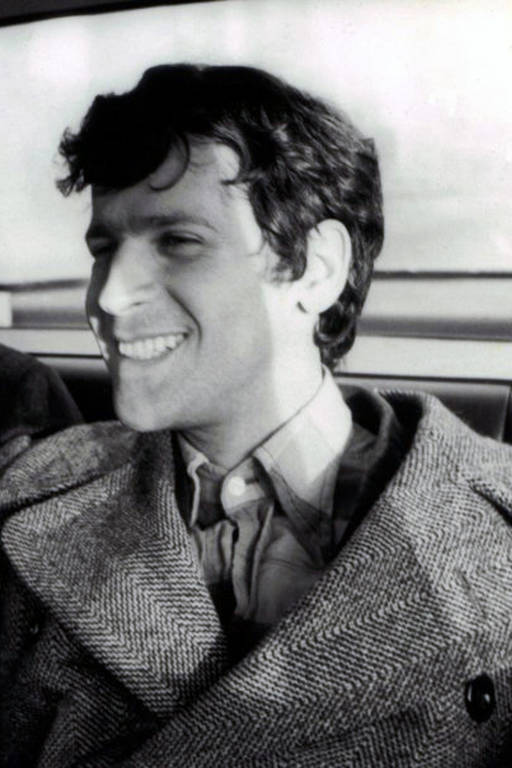
- Born: November 12, 1940; Rio de Janeiro
- Died: June 27, 2007 (aged 66); São Paulo
- Occupation: Poet
- Writing career
- Period: 1963 - 2006
- Notable work: As Horas de Katharina

Bruno Lúcio de Carvalho Tolentino (November 12, 1940 – June 27, 2007) was a Brazilian poet and intellectual, known for his opposition towards the more blatant avant-garde elements of Brazilian modernism, his advocacy of classical forms and subjects in poetry, his loathing of popular culture and concrete poetry, and by his being hailed as one of the most important and influential intellectuals of his generation. His work was awarded the Prêmio Jabuti three times, in 1994, 2000 and 2007.

== Early life ==
Tolentino was born in Rio de Janeiro.

== Work in Europe ==
After a military coup unseated President João Goulart, in 1964, Tolentino moved to Europe, when he was 24—something he later claimed to have done on the invitation of the Italian poet Giuseppe Ungaretti—at the advent of the Military Regime in Brazil. This European stay would last some thirty years. Amongst what he claimed to be his many important relationships in the European cultural scene was the English poet W. H. Auden - although Auden, in the 1960s, had long left England and was living in the USA. Tolentino was co-editor of the magazine Oxford Poetry Now, whose title was inspired by Auden's entirely distinct 1920s magazine Oxford Poetry. All four issues of Oxford Poetry Now had James Lindesay as chief-editor. Tolentino contributed to all four issues, and supported the magazine financially.

While in Europe, he published two books: Le Vrai Le Vain in 1971 and About the Hunt in 1978. Though published in France by La Part du Feu, an offprint of the magazine Actuels, Le Vrai Le Vain is absent from the Bibliothèque nationale de France integrated catalogue (as of 30 June 2010) and perhaps the only library catalogue in which it appears is that of the Albert Sloman Library of the University of Essex. This is a bilingual volume with Portuguese on the left-hand page and French on the right-hand page. Similarly, although published in England, About the Hunt failed to receive a copyright and the work is absent from the British Library integrated catalogue as of June 17. 2010, although it is present in the Oxford OLIS online catalogue. According to Tolentino's later accounts, both books were acclaimed by European critics, including Ungaretti and Auden, as well as Yves Bonnefoy, Saint-John Perse and Jean Starobinski.

== Imprisonment ==
In September 1987, at Heathrow, Tolentino, was caught, with a kilogram of cocaine, and was sentenced to eleven years in prison and served five years, mostly at Dartmoor prison.

== Controversies ==
Tolentino was an expert at self-mythologizing. Late in life multiple stories (of uncertain origin) about his life abounded, as claims that he had married Bertrand Russell's daughter, as well as René Char's and Rainer Maria Rilke's granddaughters, as well as about his being acquainted during his childhood with the most pre-eminent contemporary Brazilian men of letters in his family's salon. According to an obituary written by literary scholar Chris Miller, Tolentino was a character "stranger than fiction", and his claims about literary friendships were at least partially true (e.g. his friendship to Yves Bonnefroy); however, according to the same scholar, Tolentino's exaggerations made it very difficult to tell truth from fiction.

In a scathing account published in a history of Brazilian literature in the year of Tolentino's death, his fellow-poet Alexei Bueno charged Tolentino with having faked his entire biography from the earliest date, beginning with "his manor house and his English private female tutors": according to Bueno, Tolentino had been born "amid the most banal middle-class milieu from the neighbourhood of Tijuca, as the child of a military man, and had spent his teens in small apartments in the same neighbourhood and in Niterói". According also to Bueno, during 1957, when still in Brazil, Tolentino had been involved in a case of plagiarism, having published a book of poetry whose title and poems were taken from others. His later self-attributed resounding intellectual feats abroad, as well as his alleged connections with European literary figures, were, according to the same Bueno, simply a hoax, as "in order to have lived all happenings he publicly boasted of, [Tolentino] should have lived nearly three hundred years". Bueno, however, eventually downplayed what he saw as his mythomania by comparing him to the eminent filmmaker Mário Peixoto—who had put in circulation a bogus complimentary article on his work by Eisenstein—as well as acknowledging Tolentino's talent as a satirical poet.

Others critics have expressed similar doubts about the reality of Tolentino's biographical claims, such as being advised to write in English by Samuel Beckett, given the quality of his writing in Portuguese. Some, such as the poet and critic Ivan Junqueira, do not consider the issues mentioned above as real cases of plagiarism and hoaxing in Tolentino's career, highlighting instead his mastery of the art of pastiching the classics.

== Return to Brazil ==
After returning to Brazil in 1993, Tolentino published a series of books, collecting material produced over many years, which he considered to be the culmination of his poetic work. They are As Horas de Katharina (1971–1993), whose subject matter was loosely inspired on the life and message of Anne Catherine Emmerich, O Mundo Como Ideia (1959–1999), and A Imitação do Amanhecer (1979–2004), all winners of the Jabuti Prize for Brazilian literature. O Mundo Como Ideia is regarded as his most important literary work, developing the core of his ideas about literature. This work also won him the Senador José Ermínio de Moraes Prize, the first occasion on which this prize was awarded to a poet.

In his late phase, Tolentino adopted an activist stance in defense of classical forms and subjects, and it was as such that he clashed with the concrete poet Augusto de Campos. In an article published in the 3 September 1994 issue of Folha de S.Paulo, he criticised what he considered to be Campos' poor translation of the poem Praise for an Urn by Hart Crane, describing Campos as "prepotent and vain", "a delirious authoritarian", and a "vetuste poetic inspector". Campos issued a homophobic rejoinder published in O Estado de S. Paulo, describing Tolentino as an "international sissy" and "upstart", and his alternative translation of Crane's poem as "limping on every feet and stuffed with poor rhyming, flaccid and adipose". Though biased by polemics and homophobia, this opinion was shared by Alexei Bueno, who, although just as opposed to non-traditional poetic forms as Tolentino, nevertheless considered that

"All of Tolentino's poetry is [...] ruled by an addiction to enjambement, therefore he has written poems almost wholly without end-stopping. This kind of enjambement-powered barrel-organ, monotone to the extreme, cuts through all of his work [...] Occasionally, amid this boring and obsessive graphomany -- a kind of funfair music -- there are some great lyrical moments, which, however, are not enough to rescue the general emptiness of the whole.".

Nevertheless, Tolentino continued in his activism in defence of high culture. Shortly after the quarrel with Augusto de Campos, in an interview to Veja magazine, he criticised Campos' friend, the composer Caetano Veloso, considering the teaching of his lyrics alongside classical poetry in schools as a sign of the destruction of Brazilian culture.

Tolentino's last works include A Balada do Cárcere, published in 1996, a literary account of his experiences in Dartmoor prison.; the preceding year, he had published Os Deuses de Hoje, inspired by an experience in prison during the military dictatorship, although it is widely agreed that he left Brazil in or before 1964. Late in his life, he also came to be regarded as a cult figure by a circle of admirers, mostly for his classicizing stance in both poetry and aesthetics, expressed in a harsh critique of the present for the sake of the transcendental and mystical components of Catholicism. In his last years, Tolentino developed closer ties with conservative Catholicism through the Opus Dei, giving at least one lecture, in 2006, at one of the cultural centers kept by the prelature in Brazil.

== Death ==
Bruno, who was a victim of AIDS and had already overcome a cancer in the early 2000s, died aged 66, from multiple organ failure at the Emílio Ribas Hospital in São Paulo on 27 June 2007.

== Bibliography ==
- Pringle, Simon (2019). Das Booty: Bruno Tolentino, candomblé, tráfico e poesia: uma história real (in Portuguese). É Realizações Editora Livraria e Distribuidora LTDA. ISBN 9788580333619.
