= Otto Maria Carpeaux =

Austrian scholar and literacy critic

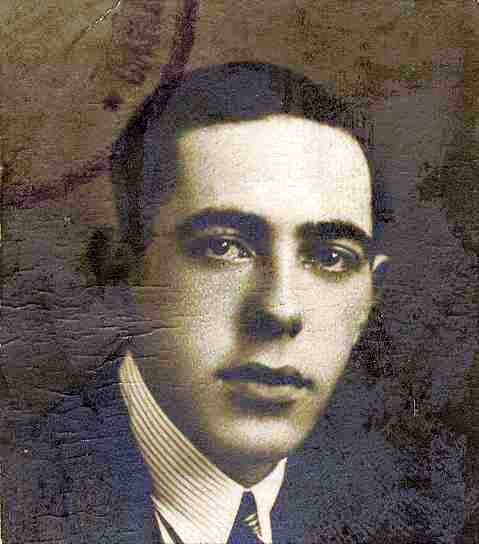
- Maria Carpeaux
- Born: 9 March 1900; Vienna, Austria
- Died: 3 February 1978 (aged 77); Rio de Janeiro, Brazil
- Education: University of Vienna (PhD, 1925)
- Occupations: Literary critic, journalist
- Writing career
- Notable work: História da Literatura Ocidental

Otto Maria Carpeaux (March 9, 1900 – February 3, 1978), born Otto Karpfen, was an Austrian-born Brazilian polymath active in the fields of literary criticism, music history, cultural studies, and political analysis.

== Career overview ==
Carpeaux was born Otto Karpfen in 1900 in Vienna, Austria-Hungary, to a Jewish family, and lived there until 1939. At the age of 20, he enrolled at the University of Vienna to study Law. In 1925, he received a PhD in letters and philosophy and began working as a journalist. Later, he also studied exact sciences and mathematics in Leipzig, sociology and philosophy in Paris, comparative literature in Naples, and politics in Berlin. At some point in his life, Karpfen converted to Roman Catholicism, adding Maria to his name and using Fidelis as his surname for some time. This conversion was evident in his political books (such as Wege Nach Rom) and his thinking, and led to his participation in the right-wing government of Engelbert Dollfuss.

When the Anschluss occurred and the Nazis took over Vienna, Carpeaux fled to Belgium. He stayed there for about a year and, at the break of the Second World War, he went to Brazil. Carpeaux did not speak Portuguese at first, and he mastered the language on his own, eventually also frenchifying his lastname to "Carpeaux", considering that it would seem more prestigious among Brazilian intellectuals. At first, he was given a simple rural job, but he gradually established himself as a literary critic. His first published article was on Franz Kafka, on the newspaper Correio da Manhã, something he did out of desperation when living under severe conditions. He was to introduce writers such as Robert Musil and Kafka to Brazilian audiences, along with the literary criticism of Wilhelm Dilthey, Benedetto Croce, Walter Benjamin and others.

His first book in Portuguese came in 1942, A Cinza do Purgatório. Two years later, he became director of Fundação Getúlio Vargas library. He also published essays on philosophers and sociologists such as Friedrich Engels and Max Weber, as well as on Brazilian writers he came to discover when in the country, writing on Carlos Drummond de Andrade e Graciliano Ramos.

Perhaps the peak of Carpeaux's production was his eight-volume História da Literatura Ocidental (History of Western Literature), available only in Portuguese, in spite of being in public domain. Carpeaux took eight years to write his masterwork, from 1941 to 1947. Late critic José Lino Grünewald labelled it one of the brightest moments of the language in prose, despite the fact that Carpeaux was not a native speaker. It is also unique in that it focuses on creating links between all periods, in order to create an organic vision of the literary history he is telling. The book also include more than 8,000 brief criticisms and expositions of the majority of the figures discussed along the way, minus the ones cited in passing; all are dealt with in their original languages, both in expositions and quotations and in the bibliography offered. The total bibliographical amount of cited works is on the merge of 30,000 books or more.

In this series, Carpeaux begins with an analysis of classical Greek and Latin literatures and proceeds until the twentieth century avant-garde movements such as surrealism and dadaism, encompassing every major literary establishments in between. For this reason, it has been called "definitive, encyclopaedic and multidisciplinary, a fundamental work in Brazilian literary and cultural bibliography". To Antonio Candido, Carpeaux's "universal vision allows him to surmount the eventual limitations of critic nacionalism, whose historic function is important in certain moments, but which must not serve to obliterate the true dimension of the literary phenomena, which, through its own nature, is transcendental as well as national. Carpeaux demonstrates in other moments how Brazilian literature benefits from being seen in a double perspective, such as his, capable of increasing insight and break routine."

Never abandoning his abomination to militarism and tyranny, Carpeaux opposed to the Brazilian Military Regime and abandoned his literary writings by 1968, in order to participate more actively on political debate. However, he did participate in the composition of an encyclopedia called Mirador. He maintained his convictions as a right-wing thinker, and died of a heart attack in 1978.

Recently, his essays have been compiled by Brazilian philosopher and journalist Olavo de Carvalho, with an added introduction. Critic Mauro Souza Ventura released De Karpfen a Carpeaux, a study in the life and work of Carpeaux. Carpeaux's other works include a dense history of German literature, several books of literary criticism, a popular history of Western music and various political writings.

== Works ==
- (1942). Cinza do Purgatório. Rio de Janeiro: Casa do Estudante do Brasil (Departamento Cultural).
- (1943). Origens e Fins. Rio de Janeiro: Casa do Estudante do Brasil (Departamento Cultural).
- (1951). Pequena Bibliografia Crítica da Literatura Brasileira. Rio de Janeiro: Ministério da Educação e Saúde, Serviço de Documentação [Letras e Artes, 1964].
- (1953). Respostas e Perguntas. Rio de Janeiro: Ministério da Educaçao e Saúde, Serviço de Documentaçao.
- (1953). Retratos e Leituras. Rio de Janeiro: Edição da "Organização Simões".
- (1958). Presenças. Ministério da Educação e Cultura, Instituto Nacional do Livro.
- (1958). Uma Nova História da Música. Zahar [José Olympio, 1967; Alhambra, 1977; Ediouro, 1999].
  - O Livro de Ouro da História da Música: Da Idade Média ao Século XX, Rio de Janeiro: Ediouro 2001.
- (1959–66). História da Literatura Ocidental (8 Vol.) Rio de Janeiro: Edições O Cruzeiro [Alhambra, 1978–87; Editora do Senado Federal, 4 Vol., 2008; Leya Brasil, 10 Vol., 2012].
- (1960). Livros na Mesa, Estudos de Crítica. Rio de Janeiro: Livraria São José.
- (1963). Novelas Alemãs. São Paulo: Editora Cultrix.
- (1964). A Literatura Alemã. São Paulo: Editora Cultrix [Nova Alexandria, 1994].
- (1965). A Batalha da América Latina. Rio de Janeiro: Editôra Civilização Brasileira.
- (1965). O Brasil no Espelho do Mundo. Rio de Janeiro: Editôra Civilização Brasileira.
- (1968). As Revoltas Modernistas na Literatura. Rio de Janeiro: Ed. de Ouro.
- (1968). Tendências Contemporâneas na Literatura. Um Esbôço. Rio de Janeiro, Ed. de Ouro, 1968.
- (1968). Vinte e Cinco Anos de Literatura. Rio de Janeiro: Editôra Civilização Brasileira.
- (1971). Hemingway: Tempo, Vida e Obra. Bruguera.
- (1976). Reflexões e Realidade. Rio de Janeiro: Fontana.
- (1978). Alceu Amoroso Lima. Paz e Terra.
- (1992). Sobre Letras e Artes. São Paulo: Nova Alexandria.
- (1999). Ensaios Reunidos, 1942-1978 (Vol.1). Rio de Janeiro: UniverCidade Editora.
- (2005). Ensaios Reunidos, 1946-1971 (Vol.2). Rio de Janeiro: UniverCidade Editora.
- (2014). Caminhos para Roma: Aventura, Queda e Vitória do Espírito. São Paulo: Vide Editorial.

== See also ==
- List of Austrian writers
