= Antonio Vieira College =

Private primary and secondary school in Salvador, Bahia, Brazil

Location
- Leovigildo Filgueiras Av., Garcia; Salvador, Bahia; Brazil; 12°59′33″S 38°31′03″W

Information
- Type: Private primary and secondary school
- Religious affiliation: Catholic
- Denomination: Jesuit
- Established: 15 March 1911; 115 years ago
- Director: Sérgio Silveira
- Grades: First through eleventh
- Gender: Coeducational
- Enrollment: 5,000
- Website: www.colegioantoniovieira.com.br

Antonio Vieira College is a private Catholic primary and secondary school located in Salvador, Brazil. Founded by the Society of Jesus in 1911, the school has about 5,000 students enrolled in grades one through eleven, and also gives night classes for youth and adults.

== History ==
The College was founded on 15 March 1911 at 43 Sodre Street. In 1912 it moved to Coqueiros da Piedade Street, and a boarding school was added. In 1915 this became Vieirense Academy of Science and Letters.

In 1926 land was acquired at Garcia Farm, and the foundation stone of a new building laid in 1930. The Jesuits acquired Mercy Farm Mar Grande in 1945. In 1967 the school began admitting girls.

In 1995 a multisport gym was opened at the college. In 1997 the College choir was founded under the direction of Cicero Alves Filho, and the Religious Music Festival (FEMURE) followed in 2000. The swimming pool was built in 2001. The Shrine of Our Lady of Fatima at the College hosts large groups like the Bahia Symphony Orchestra.

== See also ==
- List of Jesuit educational institutions
