= List of exports of Brazil =

Exports of Brazil by product category (2019) Chemical products Transportation Machines Mineral products Plastics and rubbers Metals Foodstuffs Precious metals Textiles Instruments Animal products Vegetable products Paper goods Footwear and headwear Miscellaneous Stone and glass Wood products Animal and vegetable bi-products Animal hides Arts and antiques Weapons

The following is a list of the exports of Brazil. Data is for 2012, in billions of United States dollars, as reported by The Observatory of Economic Complexity. Currently the top twenty exports are listed.

#	Product	Value
1	Iron ore	32,738
2	Crude petroleum	20,694
3	Soybeans	17,404
4	Raw sugar	13,176
5	Poultry meat	7,031
6	Soybean meal	6,707
7	Coffee	6,221
8	Corn	5,357
9	Aircraft, helicopters, and spacecraft	5,126
10	Refined petroleum	5,025
11	Sulfate chemical woodpulp	4,809
12	Cars	4,239
13	Vehicle parts	3,816
14	Semi-finished iron	3,767
15	Frozen bovine meat	3,622
16	Raw tobacco	3,330
17	Gold	3,051
18	Fruit juice	2,864
19	Ferroalloys	2,615
20	Alcohol > 80% ABV	2,351
