= Andaraí =

Municipality of Bahia, Brazil

Coordinates: 11°42′45″S 40°37′33″W

- Municipality
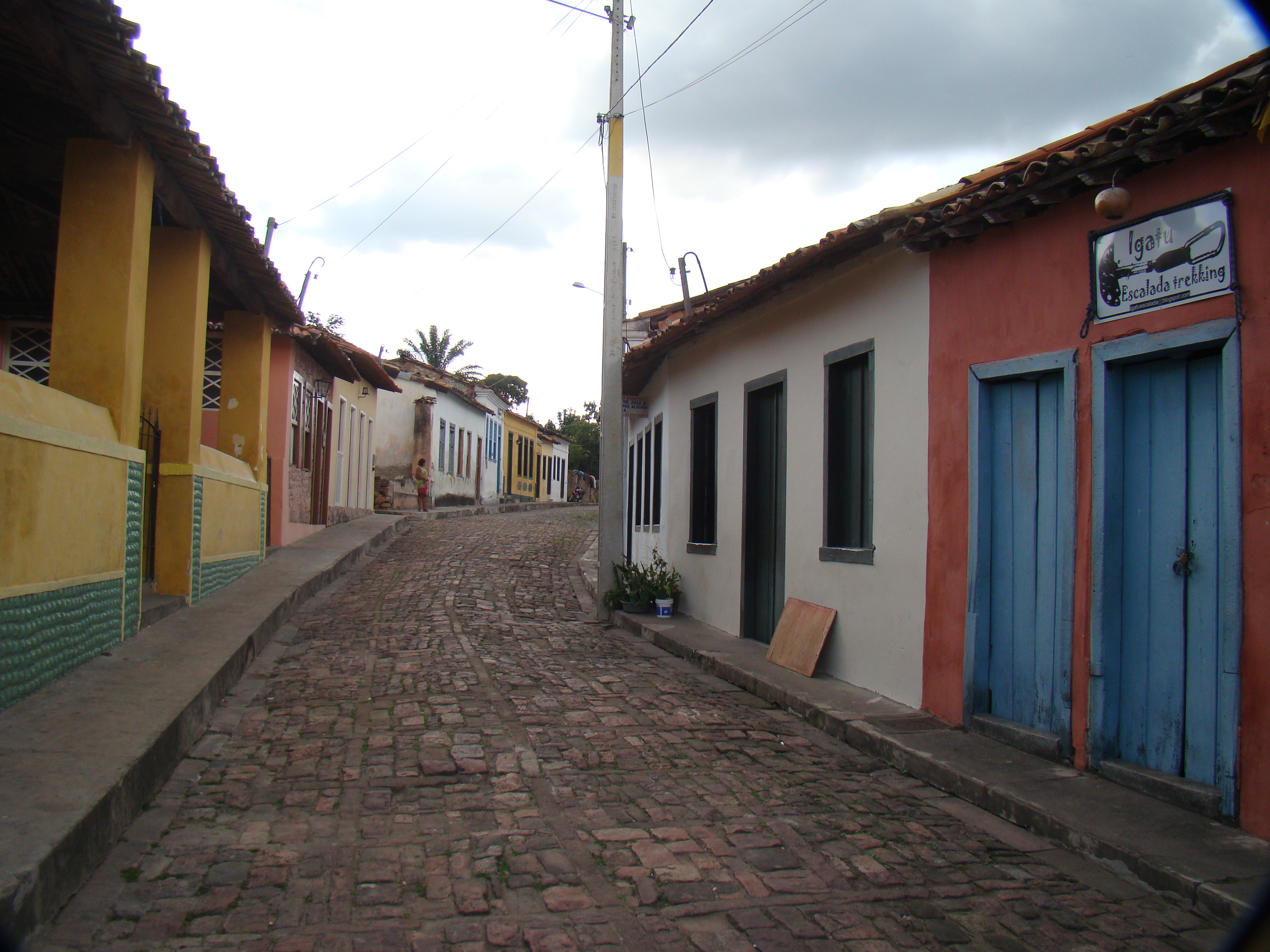

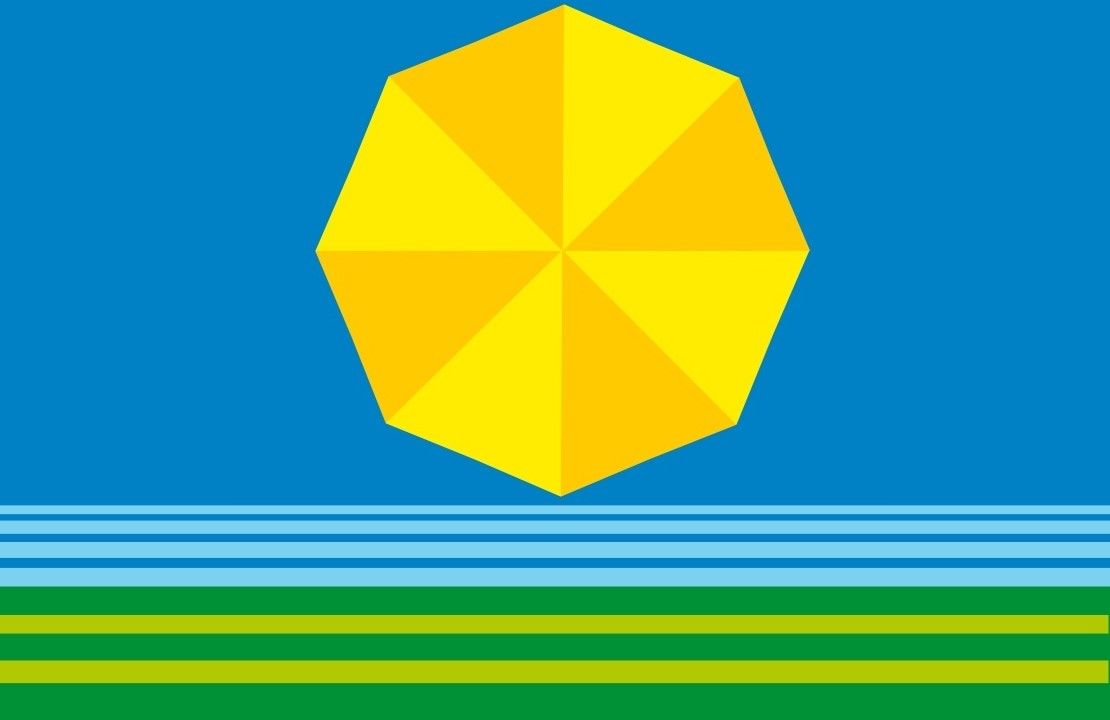
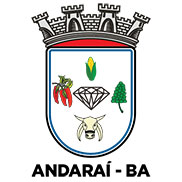
- Flag Coat of arms
- Interactive map of Andaraí
- Country: Brazil
- Region: Nordeste
- State: Bahia

Population (2020)
  - Total: 13,132
- Time zone: UTC -3

Andaraí is a municipality in the state of Bahia in the North-East region of Brazil.

== See also ==
- List of municipalities in Bahia
