= Marques Rebelo =

Brazilian writer

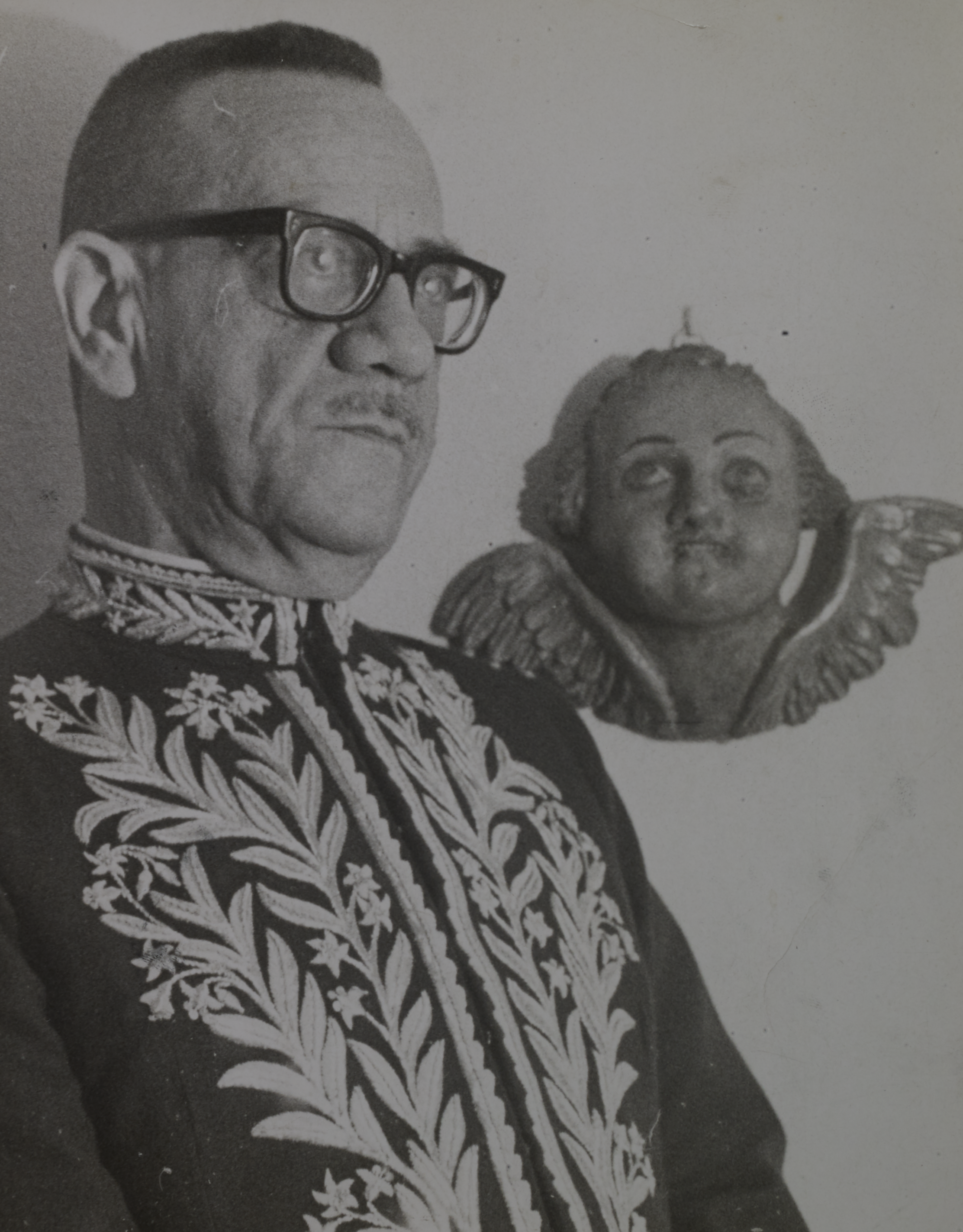
- Born: Edy Dias da Cruz; 6 January 1906; Rio de Janeiro
- Died: 26 August 1973 (aged 67); Rio de Janeiro
- Occupations: novelist, short story writer, children's writer, journalist
- Spouse(s): Alice Dora de Miranda França (1933); Elza Proença (c. 1940)
- Writing career
- Period: 1931–1970
- Notable works: A Estrela Sobe; O Espelho Partido
- Notable awards: Prêmio Jabuti (1960, 1963)

Marques Rebelo, pseudonym of Edy Dias da Cruz (6 January 1907 — 26 August 1973), was a Brazilian writer associated to the Modernist movement.

== Life ==
Edy Dias da Cruz was born in Rio de Janeiro, in 1907. He spent his childhood in Barbacena, in the state of Minas Gerais. There he studied and became an avid reader. He returned to Rio in 1918, to finish his secondary education. He later studied Medicine but did not finish the course, later working as a salesman.

Adopting the pen name Marques Rebelo, he started submitting poems and short stories for magazines. In 1931 he published his first book, Oscarina, a short story collection. The book was praised by the critics at the time. Rebelo worked for several newspapers and magazines and wrote a number of books, among them novels, short stories, and children's books. Despite being associated to the Brazilian Modernism, Rebelo's urban prose and social commentary owes much to writers like Manuel Antonio de Almeida (of whom Rebelo wrote a biography), Lima Barreto and Machado de Assis.

In 1965, Rebelo was nominated to the Brazilian Academy of Letters.

Rebelo died on 26 August 1973.

== Selected works ==
- Oscarina, 1931
- Três caminhos, 1933
- Marafa, 1935
- A estrela sobe, 1939
- Stela me abriu a porta, 1942
- Vida e obra de Manuel Antônio de Almeida, 1943
- Cenas da vida brasileira, 1943
- Bibliografia de Manuel Antônio de Almeida, 1951
- Cortina de ferro, 1956
- Correio europeu, 1959
- O Trapicheiro, 1959
- A mudança, 1962
- O simples Coronel Madureira, 1967
- Antologia Escolar Brasileira, 1967
- Brasil, Terra & Alma: Guanabara, 1967
- A Guerra está entre nós, 1968
- Antologia Escolar Portuguesa, 1970
