= Prêmio Jabuti =

Literary award in Brazil

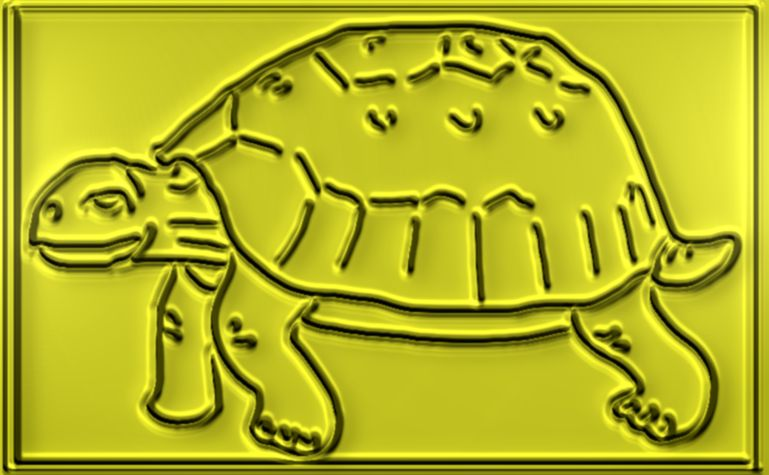
The logo for the Prêmio Jabuti.

The Prêmio Jabuti (the "Tortoise Prize") is the most traditional literary award in Brazil, given by the Câmara Brasileira do Livro. It was conceived by Edgard Cavalheiro in 1959 when he presided over the CBL, with the interest of rewarding authors, editors, illustrators, graphics and booksellers who stood out each year.

In 1959, there were only seven categories: Literature, Cover, Illustration, Editor of the Year, Chart of the Year, Bookseller of the Year and Literary Personality. Subsequently, the award incorporated other categories involving the creation and production of books, such as Adaptation, Graphic Design and Translation. In addition to the traditional categories such as Romance, Tales and Chronicles, Poetry, Children's, Youth, Reportage and Biography. The "Fiction Book of the Year" and "Non-Fiction Book of the Year" categories were created in 1991 and 1993, respectively. The Jabuti Award began to include two new divisions in 2017: Comics and Brazilian Book Published Abroad.

In 2018, the Jabuti Award changed its format, with the then 29 categories being reduced to 18, distributed along four axes. In addition, it also changed the "Book of the Year" category (which until then awarded two books, one fiction and one nonfiction), starting to prize only one book, regardless of genre.

The Yearbook will be awarded to a single work, whether Fiction or Non-Fiction. The author will receive a special Tortoise trophy and a gross value of R$ 100,000.00 (one hundred thousand reais). The publisher of the work will receive a unique figurine (2019).

Since its first edition in 1959 many new categories have been added, and today it covers numerous literary and related categories:

== Categories ==
- Translation
- Architecture and Urban Studies, Photography, Communications and Arts
- Literary Criticism and Literary Theory
- Illustration for Children's Literature or Young Adult Literature
- Exact Sciences, Technology and Information Technology
- Education, Psychology and Psychoanalysis
- Journalism
- Pedagogy
- Economics, Business Administration, Business
- Law
- Biography
- Cover Art
- Poetry
- Social Sciences
- Natural Sciences and Health Sciences
- Short Stories and Chronicles
- Children's Literature
- Young Adult Literature
- Novels (Premio Jabuti - Literary Novel category)
- Comic Book

== Partial selection of winners ==
=== 1959 ===
- Jorge Amado, Novel
- Jorge Medauar, Stories / novels
- Associação dos Geógrafos Brasileiros (Seção São Paulo), Literary Studies (Essays)
- Mário da Silva Brito, Literary History
- Renato Sêneca Fleury, Children's Literature
- Isa Silveira Leal, Juvenile literature
- Carlos Bastos, Illustrations
- Aldemir Martins, Cover Artist

=== 1960 ===
- Marques Rebelo, Novel / Fiction
- Dalton Trevisan, Stories / novels
- Sosigenes Costa, Poetry
- Paulo Cavalcanti, Literary Studies (Essays)
- Antonio Candido, Literary History
- Arnaldo Magalhães de Giacomo, Children's Literature
- Oswaldo Storni, Illustrations
- Eugênio Hirsch, Cover Artist

=== 1961 ===
- Maria de Lourdes Teixeira, Novel / Fiction
- Clarice Lispector, Stories / novels
- Olímpio de Sousa Andrade, Literary Studies (Essays)
- Cassiano Ricardo, Poetry
- Otto Maria Carpeaux, Literary History
- Breno Silveira, Literary translations
- Francisco de Barros Júnior, Children's Literature
- Frank Schaeffer, Illustrations
- Clóvis Graciano, Cover Artist

=== 1963 ===
- Marques Rebelo, Novel / Fiction
- Julieta de Godoy Ladeira, Stories / novels
- Mário Chamie, Poetry
- Mário Graciotti, Literary Studies (Essays)
- Jacob Penteado, Biography and memoir
- José Aderaldo Castelo, Literary History
- Jorge Mautner, Adult Literature (author revelation)
- Cecília Meireles, Literary translations
- Elos Sand, Children's Literature
- Vicente Di Grado, Cover Artist

=== 1964 ===
- Francisco Marins, Novel / Fiction
- João Antônio, Stories / novels
- Herman Lima, Poetry
- Cecília Meireles, Poetry
- Otto Maria Carpeaux, Literary History
- João Antônio, Adult Literature (author revelation)
- Maria José Dupré, Children's Literature
- Florestan Fernandes, Human Sciences (except letters)
- Oswaldo Sangiorgi, Exact science - Mathematics
- Crodoaldo Pavan/Antônio Brito da Cunha/Maury Miranda, Natural Sciences - Genetics
- Percy Lau, Illustrations
- Ove Osterbye, Cover Artist

=== 1970 ===
- Lupe Cotrim, Poetry

=== 1979 ===
- Mário Donato, Novel / Fiction
- Sônia Coutinho, Stories / novels
- Leila Coelho Frota, Poetry
- Davi Arrigucci Júnior, Literary Studies (Essays)
- Cyro dos Anjos, Biography or memoir
- Augusto de Campos, Translation of literary work
- Joel Rufino dos Santos, Children's Literature
- Adofo Crippa, Human Sciences (except letters)
- Cláudio Lucchesi, Tomasz Kowaltowski, Janos Simon, Imre Simon and Istvan Simon, Exact sciences
- Mário Guimarães Ferri, Natural Sciences
- Maurício Prates de Campos Filho, Science (Technology)
- Eugênio Amado, Translation of scientific work
- Alceu Amoroso Lima, Literary person of the year

=== 1983 ===
- Caio Fernando Abreu, Stories / novels

=== 1985 ===
- João Ubaldo Ribeiro, Novel / Fiction
- Charles Kiefer, Stories and chronicles
- Alphonsus de Guimaraens Filho, Poetry
- Antonio Paim, Human sciences

=== 1996 ===
- Charles M. Culver, Best Medical book published in Brazil in 1995

=== 1999 ===
- Carlos Nascimento Silva, Sônia Coutinho and Modesto Carone, Novel / Fiction
- Charles Kiefer, Rubens Figueiredo and João Inácio Padilha, Stories and chronicles
- Haroldo de Campos, Gerardo Melo Mourão and Salgado Maranhão, Poetry
- Editora Globo, Ivo Barroso and Victor Burton, Translation
- Ricardo Azevedo (duas publ) and Lourenço Cazarré, Children's / youth literature
- Eduardo Bueno, Hilário Franco Junior and Novais/Sevcenko/Schwarcz, Human Sciences
- Alfredo K. Oyama Homma, Pedro L. B. Lisboa and Lacaz/Porto/Vaccari/Melo, Natural Science and medicine
- Márcia Helena Mendes Ferraz, Herch Moysés Nussenzveig and Sônia Pitta Coelho/Francisco César Polcino Milies, Exact sciences, Technology and Computers
- Paul Singer, Josué Rios and Celso Furtado, Economics, Management, Business and Law
- Roger Mello, Demóstenes Vargas and Roberto Weigand, Illustration of children's or youth books

=== 2001 ===
- Boaventura de Sousa Santos, Human Sciences and Education

=== 2011 ===
- Ferreira Gullar, Fiction book of the year and Poetry.
- Dalton Trevisan, Stories / novels
- Marina Colasanti, Children's Literature

Note: Gilberto Freyre won a posthumous award.

=== 2022 ===
- Daniel Kondo, Children's Literature
