= João Caetano =

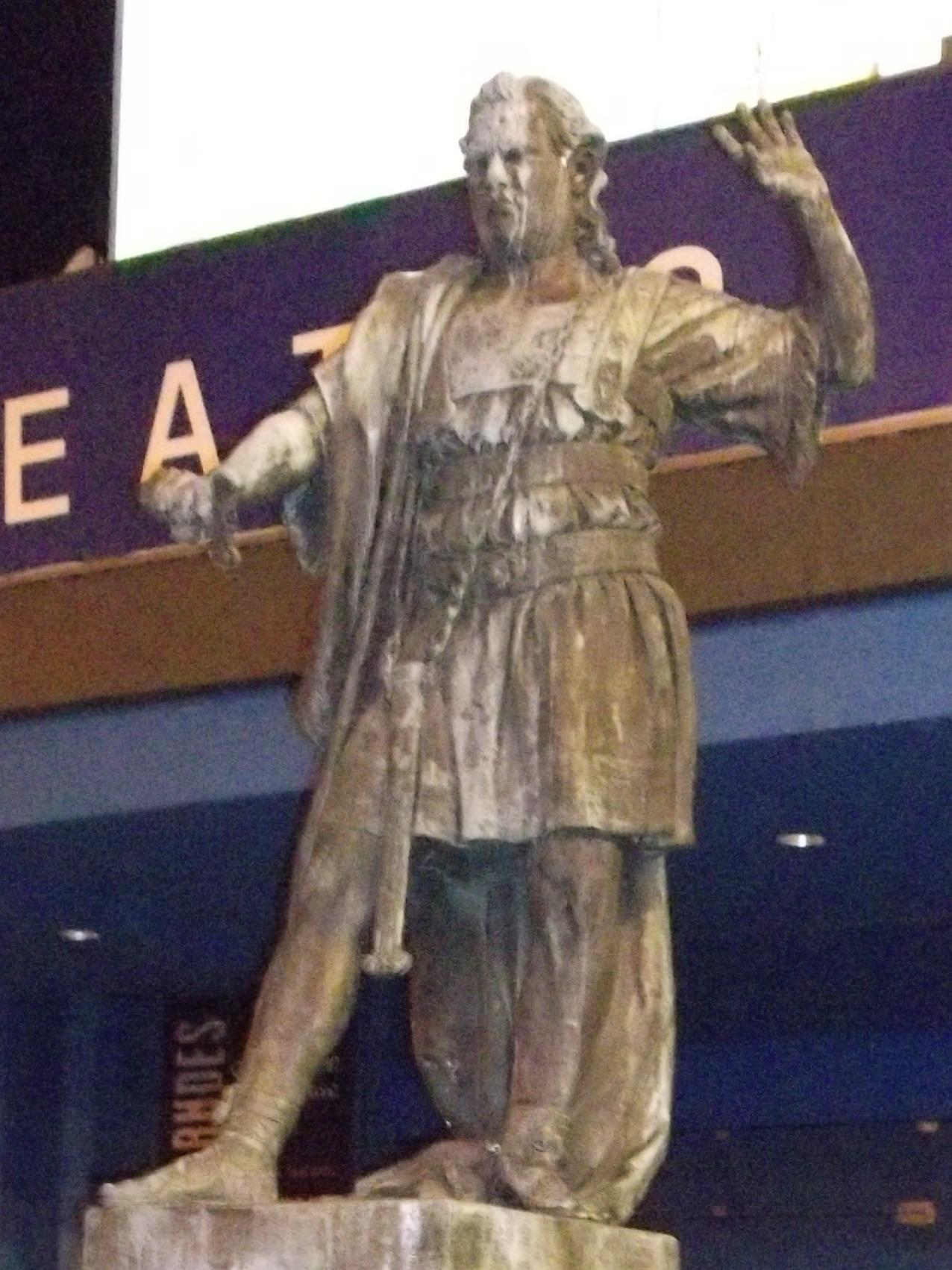
- Statue of João Caetano, in front of Teatro João Caetano, Rio de Janeiro, Brazil
- Born: João Caetano dos Santos; January 27, 1808. Itaboraí, Province of Rio de Janeiro, State of Brazil
- Died: August 24, 1863 (aged 55); Rio de Janeiro, Province of Rio de Janeiro,Empire of Brazil
- Occupations: Theater actor, theater director
- Years active: 1831–1862
- Spouse: Estela Sezefreda

João Caetano dos Santos (27 January 1808 – 24 August 1863) was a Brazilian theater actor and director.

Considered the "father of Brazilian theater", João Caetano was the first Brazilian actor to play Shakesperean roles. "Relatively early in his career", he decided to play Othello and Hamlet under the influence of poet and playwright Domingos José Gonçalves de Magalhães in translations done by Magalhães himself, not directly based on Shakespeare, but rather on Jean-François Ducis, due the Brazilian Francophile tradition.

Prior to this achievement, even in colonial Brazil and with Caetano himself, productions of Hamlet or any other Shakespearean play began to be staged by companies that used versions in European Portuguese — Hamlet would be the first Shakespearean play to be translated into Brazilian Portuguese in a published edition, but only in 1933 by Tristão da Cunha.

== Life ==
Caetano began his acting career as an amateur; his professional debut was on 24 April 1831, in the play O Carpinteiro da Livônia, later staged as Pedro, o Grande.

Two years later, in 1833, João Caetano was already performing at the Niterói theater with a cast of Brazilian actors and he later created the Companhia Nacional João Caetano. On March 13, 1838, he played the lead role in the tragedy António José, ou o Poeta e a Inquisição, by Gonçalves de Magalhães, considered the first original play in Brazilian theater. That same year, he staged the first Brazilian comedy, O Juiz de Paz na Roça, by Martins Pena.

Caetano also worked as impresário and rehearsal director. A self-taught performer, he favored tragedies, but also played comical roles.

In addition to acting in many plays, both in Rio and in the provinces, João Caetano published two books on the art of acting: Reflexões Dramáticas, from 1837, and Lições Dramáticas, from 1862.

In 1843, João Caetano became the main shareholder of the Teatro São Pedro de Alcântara in Rio de Janeiro, later named Teatro João Caetano.

=== School of art ===
In 1860, after a visit to France's Royal Conservatory, João Caetano organized in Rio a school of dramatic arts, where the tuition was free. Furthermore, he promoted the creation of a drama jury to award prizes to national productions.

== Bibliography ==
- Décio de Almeida Prado, João Caetano e a arte do ator - Estudos críticos. São Paulo: Ática, 1984.
- José Roberto O'shea, Early Shakespearean Stars Performing in Brazilian Skies: João Caetano and National Theater. In: KLIMAN, Bernice W; SANTOS, Rick J. (org.). Latin American Shakespeares. Madison; Teaneck, Fairleigh Dickinson University Press, 2005, pp. 25–36.
- Eugênio Gomes, Shakespeare no Brasil. Ministério da Educação e Cultura/ Departamento de Imprensa Nacional, 1961.
