= Order of Christ (Brazil) =

Brazilian imperial order of chivalry

Imperial Order of Christ Imperial Ordem de Cristo
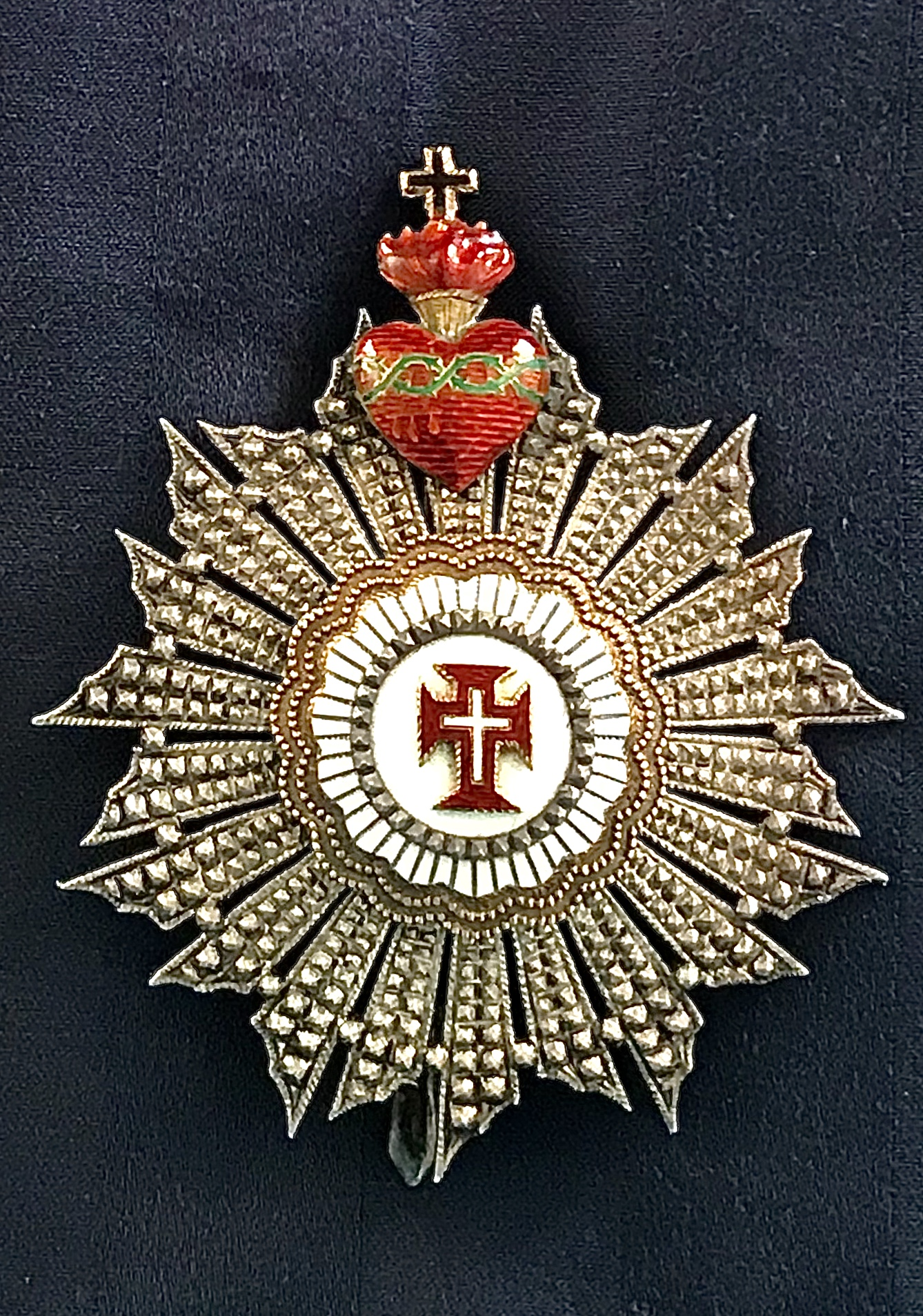
- Grand Cross star of the Imperial Order of Our Lord Jesus Christ

Awarded by the Head of the Brazilian Imperial Family
- Type: Dynastic Order
- Established: 7 December 1822; 1822–1890 (National Order); 1890–present (House Order)
- Royal house: House of Orleans-Braganza
- Status: Cancelled as national order in 1890, since then claimed as house order
- Grand Master: Disputed: Prince Bertrand of Orléans-Braganza; Prince Pedro Carlos of Orléans-Braganza
- Grades: Grand Cross; Commander; Knight

Precedence
- Next (higher): none (highest)
- Next (lower): Imperial Order of Aviz
- Ribbon bar of the Order

The Imperial Order of Our Lord Jesus Christ (Portuguese: Imperial Ordem de Nosso Senhor Jesus Cristo), (Note: Brazilian Portuguese pronunciation: [ĩpeɾiˈaw ˈɔʁdẽj̃ dʒi ˈnɔsu sẽˈɲoʁ ʒeˈzu(j)s ˈkɾistu]) often simply named Order of Christ, is an order of chivalry instituted by emperor Pedro I of Brazil on 7 December 1822, on the basis of the Portuguese Order of Christ founded by King Dom Dinis and Pope John XXII in 1316–1319.

The order was used to award persons for exceptional services that resulted in notable and proven utility to religion (Roman Catholicism), to humanity and the state. Knights of the Order of Christ were part of the untitled nobility of the Empire of Brazil.

On 22 March 1890, the order was cancelled as national order by the interim government of United States of Brazil. However, since the deposition in 1889 of the last Brazilian monarch, Emperor Pedro II, the order is claimed as a house order, being awarded by the heads of the House of Orleans-Braganza, pretenders to the defunct throne of Brazil. The current Brazilian Imperial Family is split into two branches, Petrópolis and Vassouras, and the Grand Mastership of the Order is disputed between those two branches.

== Origin ==
After the Independence of Brazil Emperor Dom Pedro I continued his inherent authority as the "Fount of Honour" transmitted by his father King Dom João VI of Portugal. His right extended to conferring titles of nobility and also the three ancient Portuguese orders of chivalry: Order of Christ, Order of Aviz and the Order of Saint James of the Sword. Dom Pedro I became the first Grand Master of the Brazilian branch of the Order of Christ. According to historian Roderick J. Barman, Dom Pedro I stated in a decree that his right originated in: "Sovereign Kings my Predecessors, ... and especially by my August and Sovereign Father D. João VI." After the death of his father, Dom Pedro I also became the Grand Master of the Portuguese Order of Christ as King Pedro IV of Portugal.

Description of the Order of Christ in the Almanak Laemmert court almanac published in 1889:

Created by King Dom Dinis, in 1316. Preserved as a Brazilian order by the law of October 20, 1823. Regulated by decree n. 321 of September 9, 1843. Also decree n. 2853 of December 7, 1861. This order has 12 Grand crosses (treatment of Excellency), not included in these numbers the members of the Imperial family and the princes and foreign citizens; Commanders and Knights are without a set number. The Emperor is the Grand Master; the heir of the Crown is the Major-Commander.

== Reform of 1843 ==
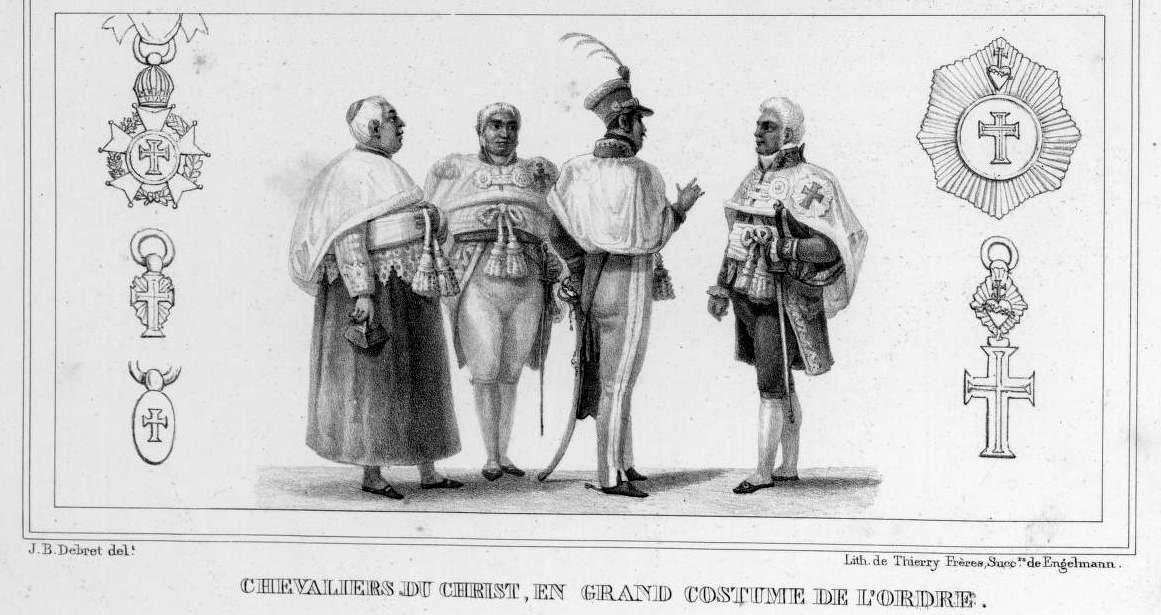
Knights of Christ in Rio de Janeiro during the reign of Dom Pedro I

In 1834 the Portuguese Order of Christ was reformed by the Liberal government of Portugal and Queen Maria II (sister of Emperor Dom Pedro II). The order lost its military prerogatives with the reform and became a national order. As such the Brazilian branch of the Order of Christ was the only branch that maintained its military status. In 1843 the Brazilian branch was also reformed by Emperor Dom Pedro II and became a national order with decree N. 2853. As such the Order of Christ ended its existence as a military order both in Portugal and Brazil; however the order remained highly regarded by the nobility of Brazil and Portugal as a result of its importance to history and the prestige that it provided to knights. Members of all Brazilian orders of knighthood were part of the untitled nobility regardless of grade, depending on the knight's grade they also received military honors, salutes and honorific styles.

== Admission ==
It was considered relevant and extraordinary services for admittance into all imperial orders after 1861 the following services:

- Services provided for the maintenance of the public order and for preservation of the national independence, integrity and dignity.
- Services provided during public calamity.
- Services provided for the benefit of the parish church (Roman Catholic), roads, waterways and other works or establishments for the public good.

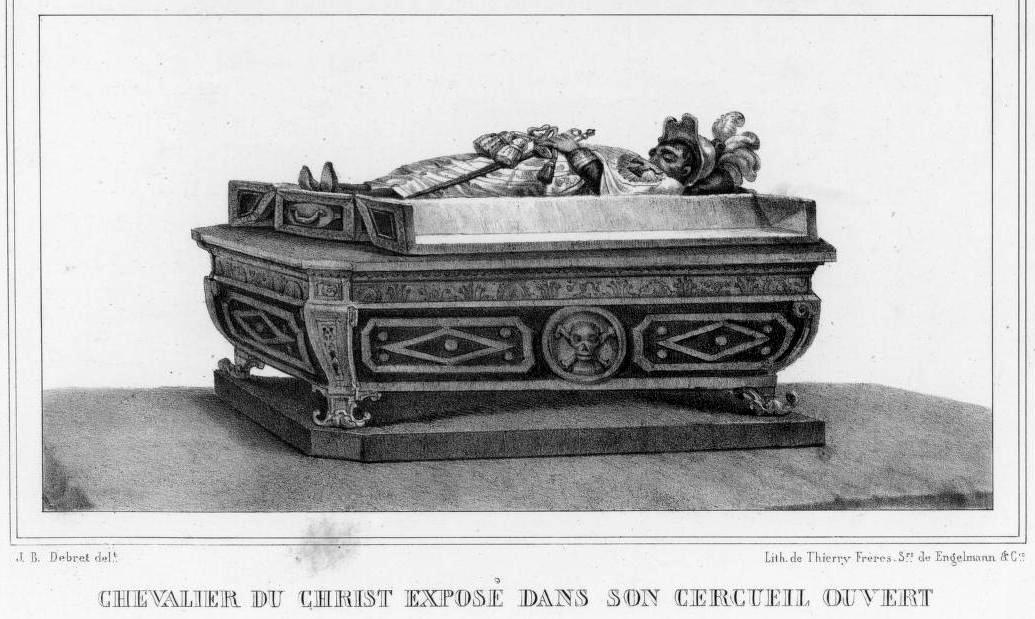
Military Funeral of a Knight of Christ in Rio de Janeiro during the reign of Dom Pedro I.

Basically all services that resulted in notable and proven utility to religion, to humanity and the state, that were provided during public, ecclesiastical or military functions; be it in science, letters, arts or industry.

=== Forms of admission ===
There were two ways to be admitted to the Order of Christ after the reform of 1861, they were:

- The Order was given by the Emperor after review by the Minister of Internal affairs for extraordinary services recognized by the Empire. Members of the Imperial administration, such as ministers of state, the Imperial family and high ranking foreigners were excluded from any requirements.
- A citizen could file a petition to the Emperor, the individual had to prove extraordinary services; the process was very complex and involved the approval of different authorities, including the state attorney, the provincial president, the Emperor and sometimes the Bishop.

=== Requirements for admission ===
If filing a petition, the following requirements had to be completed:

- Art 1. Nobody was admitted to the Empire's honorific orders without a request that proved at least 20 years of distinct services. The only exception was for members of the clergy of the Catholic Church, they were admitted with 10 years of service and also members of the military, they had the years of service counted twice for each year required.
- Art 2. The request had to be signed by a representative especially authorized and the following documents had to be added to the request: Authentic documents that proved the services provided; criminal record proving that the individual was not involved as a defendant in a criminal procedure; letters from superior authorities with whom the individual had served attesting to the records; other documents necessary to prove 20 years of service.
- Art 3. The provincial attorneys had to give their opinion regarding the individual and after it send the recommendation to the provincial president and the president sent the request to the Imperial government. If the individual was a member of the clergy the Church superiors also had to authorize the request. The provincial president and the bishop had to be explicit about their opinion of the individuals entering the order.
- Art 4. The person that petitioned for entrance into the order could use his record of service only once, if a new petition was made he could use only the services provided after the first petition.
- Art 5. Admission for any applicant if approved was always in the first grade of the order, individuals could not be promoted without proof of 4 extra years of service after admission to the previous grade.

=== Loss of Knighthood ===
Membership into the order was given for life, however, members could be expelled from the order if: a member lost his Brazilian citizenship for breaking articles 2, 3 or 7 of the Imperial constitution; if guilty of a criminal offence; if the individual lost his post in the Guarda Nacional as a result of a criminal offence; and if the individual committed a political crime that resulted in the loss of political rights.

== Grades ==
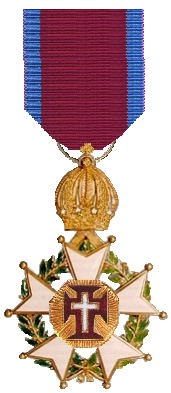
The decoration of a military knight (front)

The Order of Christ was issued in three grades:

- Grand Cross, who wore the badge on a sash on the right shoulder, plus the star on the left side of the chest;
- Commander, who wore the badge on a necklet, plus the star on the left side of the chest;
- Knight, who wore the badge on a ribbon on the left side of the chest.

The order had a limit of 12 Grand Crosses, not included in this numbers the members of the Brazilian Imperial Family (grand crosses) and the princes and foreign citizens. There was no maximum numbers set for Commanders and Knights.

== Insignia ==
The insignia were basically the same as the Portuguese Order of the same name, with the addition of a stylized Imperial Crown of Brazil to the badge and a different ribbon to distinguish it from the Portuguese Order.

- The badge was entirely different for civil and military knights: the civil knights wore a cross that was a silver gilt and red enamel cross potent formy with decorative chiseled border and with inset white enamel Latin cross. The military knights had a different insignia, this being a gilt, white enameled Maltese Cross with ball-tipped finials, with laurel wreath between the arms. The central disc was on the front a golden rayed disc and on the back a white enameled disc, with a miniature of the above described cross in it; the badge was topped by a gilt imperial crown.
- The star of the Order has 22 asymmetrical arms of rays, in gilt for Grand Cross, and in silver for Commander. The central disc was in white enamel, with a miniature of the above described cross in it. The Sacred Heart of Christ was placed at the top of the star.
- The historical ribbon of the Order was red with small light blue stripes at each edge.
- The modern ribbon of the Order is red.

== Recipients ==
=== Knights ===
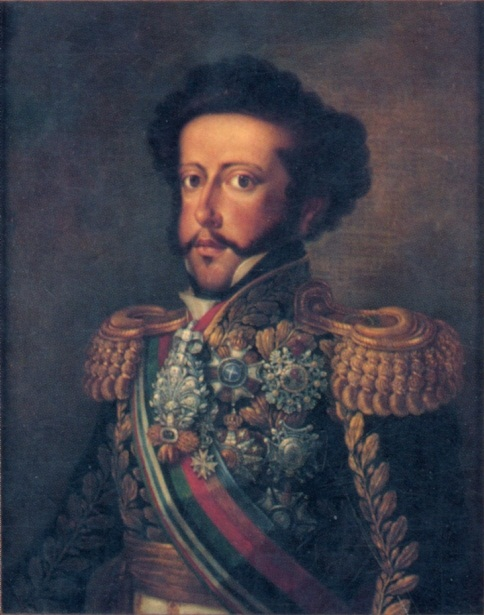
Emperor Dom Pedro I, first Grand Master of the Imperial Order of Christ and later Grand Master of the Portuguese Order of Christ, wearing the combined sash of the Brazilian Imperial Orders

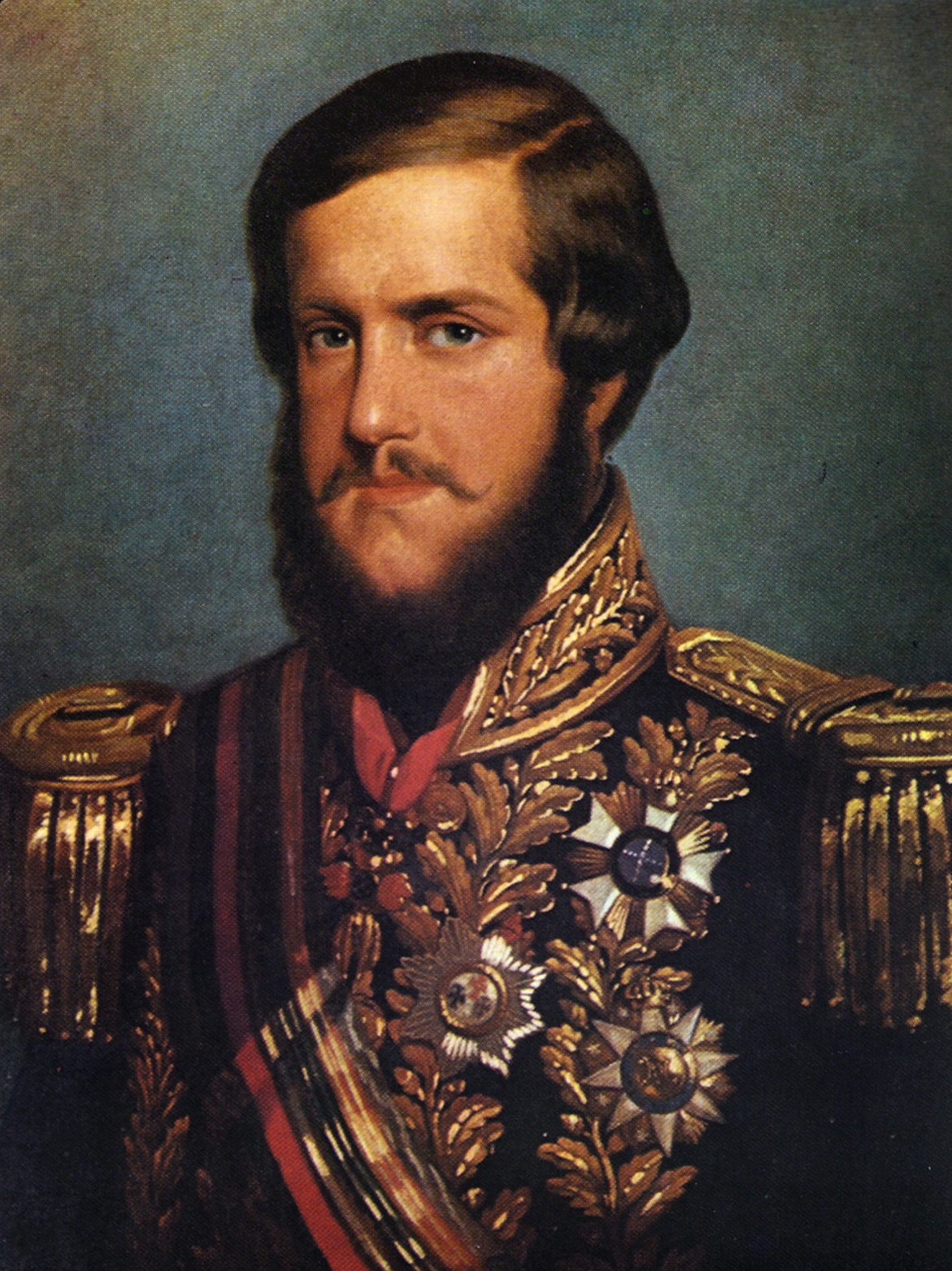
Emperor Dom Pedro II, second Grand Master of the Imperial Order of Christ, wearing the joint sash of the Brazilian Imperial Orders

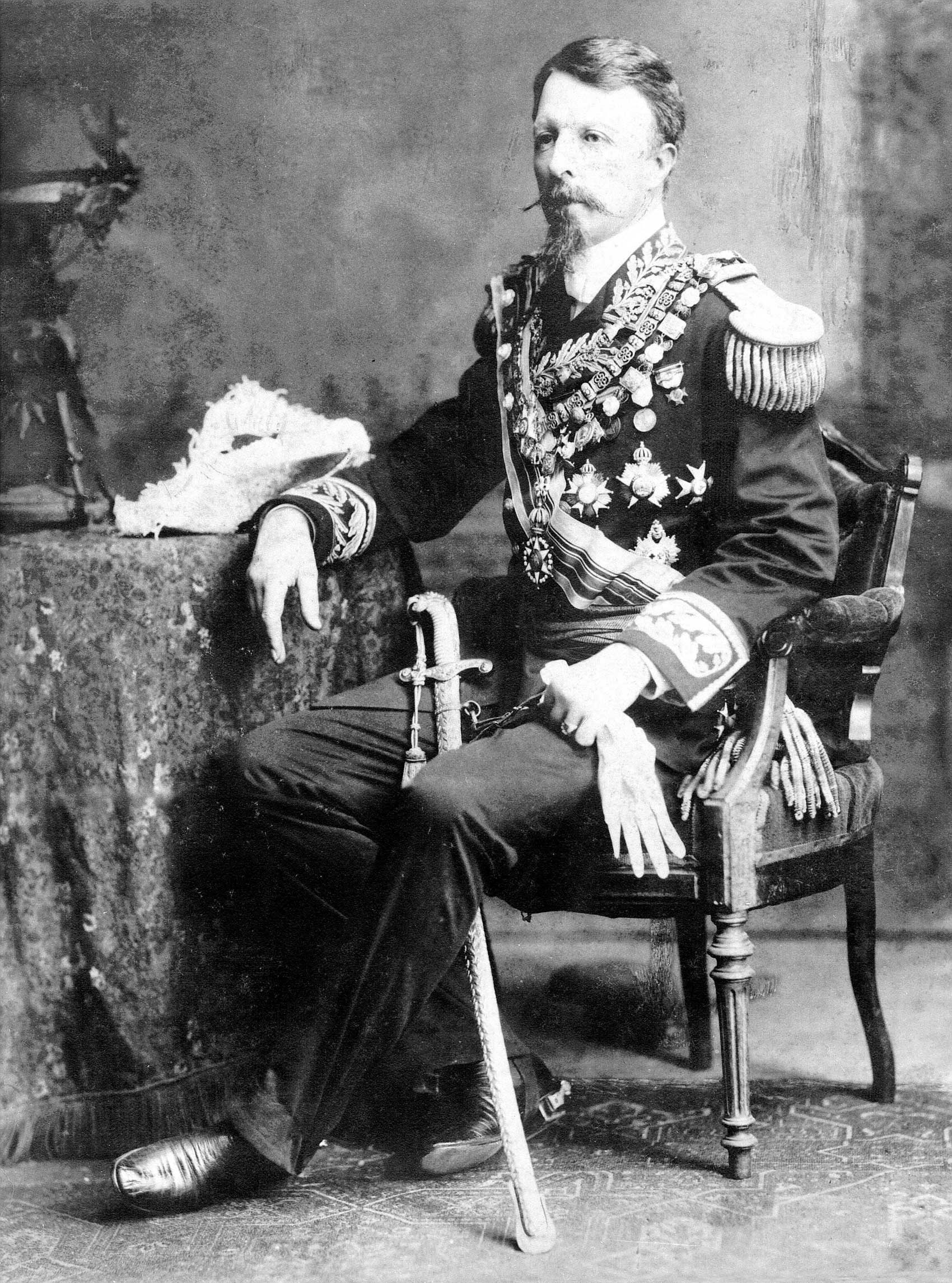
Prince Gaston, Count of Eu, wearing the sash of the order

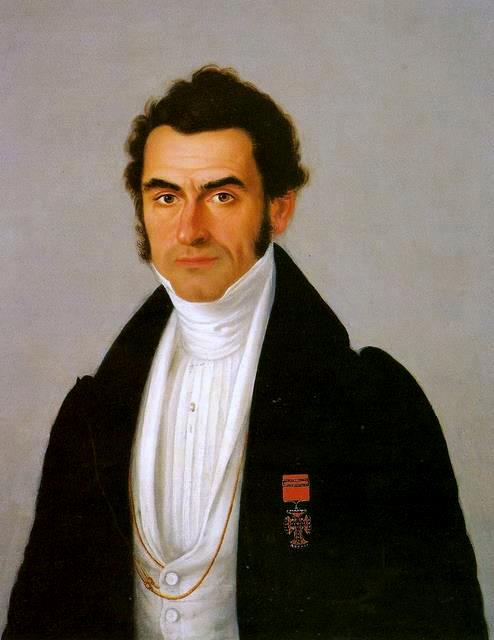
Baron Duarte da Ponte Ribeiro, Knight of the Order of Christ

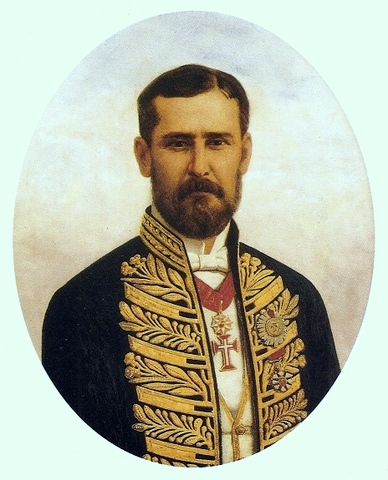
Antônio de Araújo de Aragão Bulcão, 3rd Baron of São Francisco

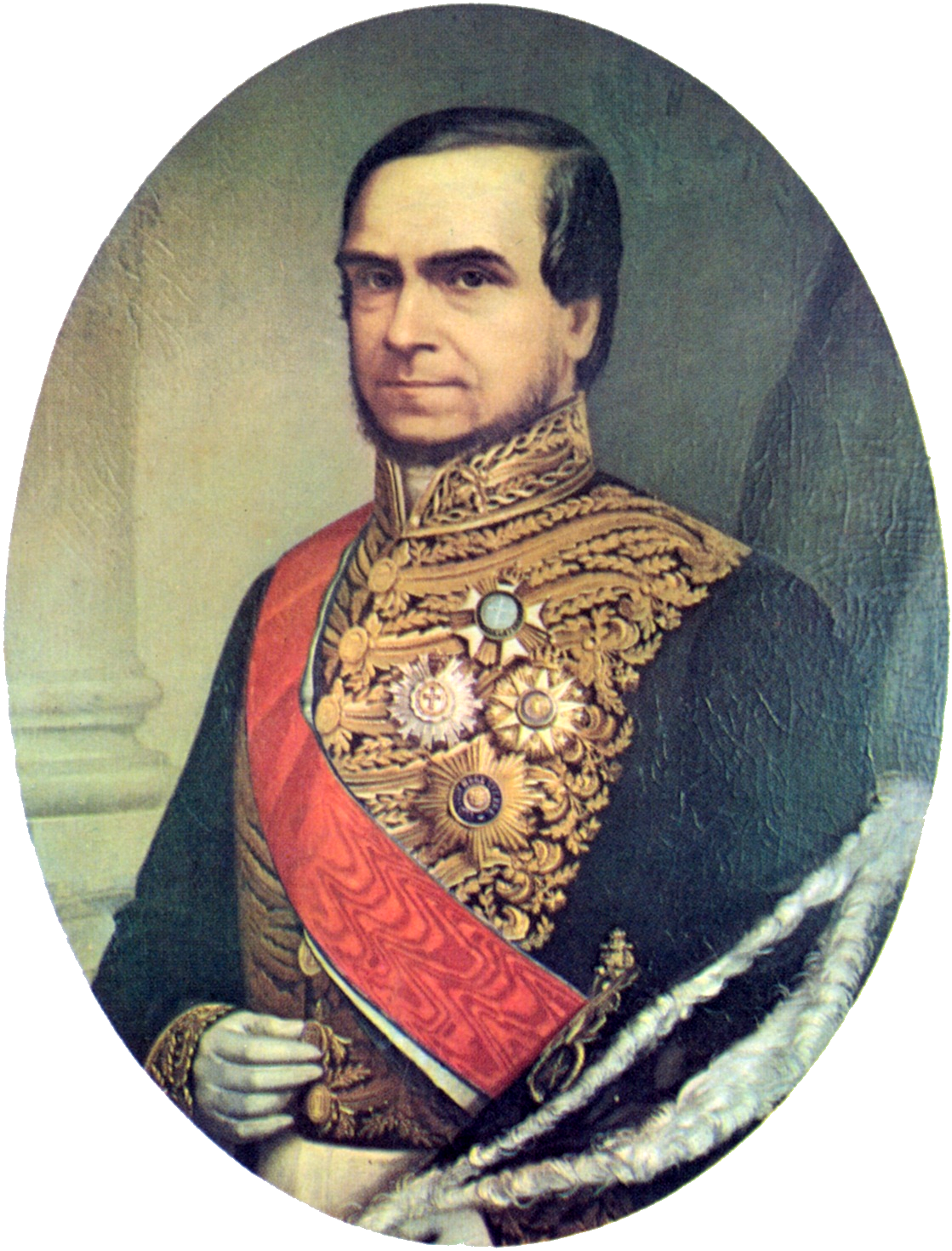
Honório Hermeto Carneiro Leão, Marquis of Paraná

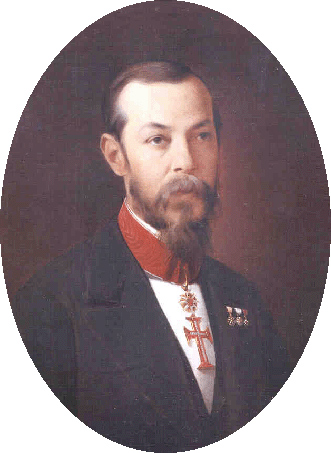
Count of Mesquita, Commander of the Order of Christ

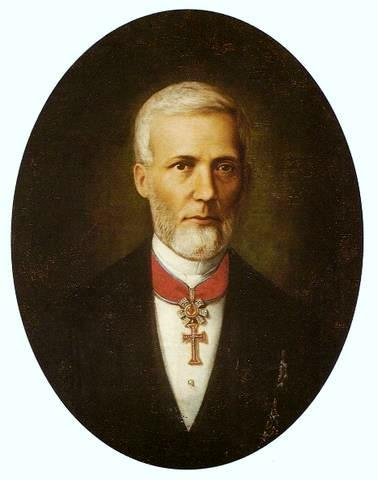
Francisco Vicente Viana Filho, Commander of the Order of Christ

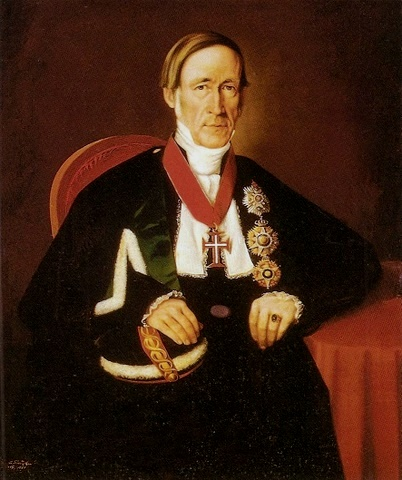
Counselor Jonathas Abbott, Commander of the Order of Christ

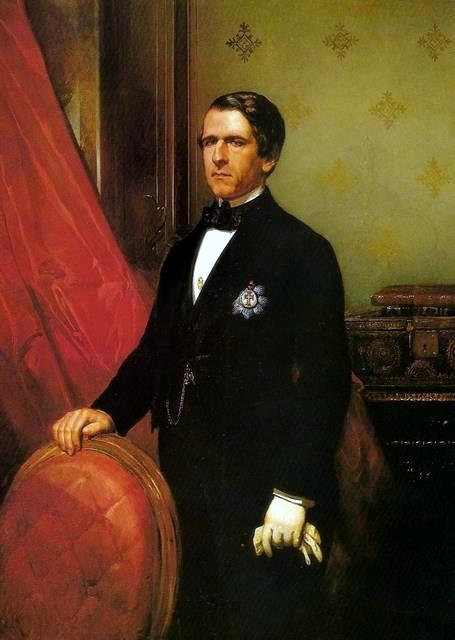
Count of Itamaraty, Commander of the Order of Christ

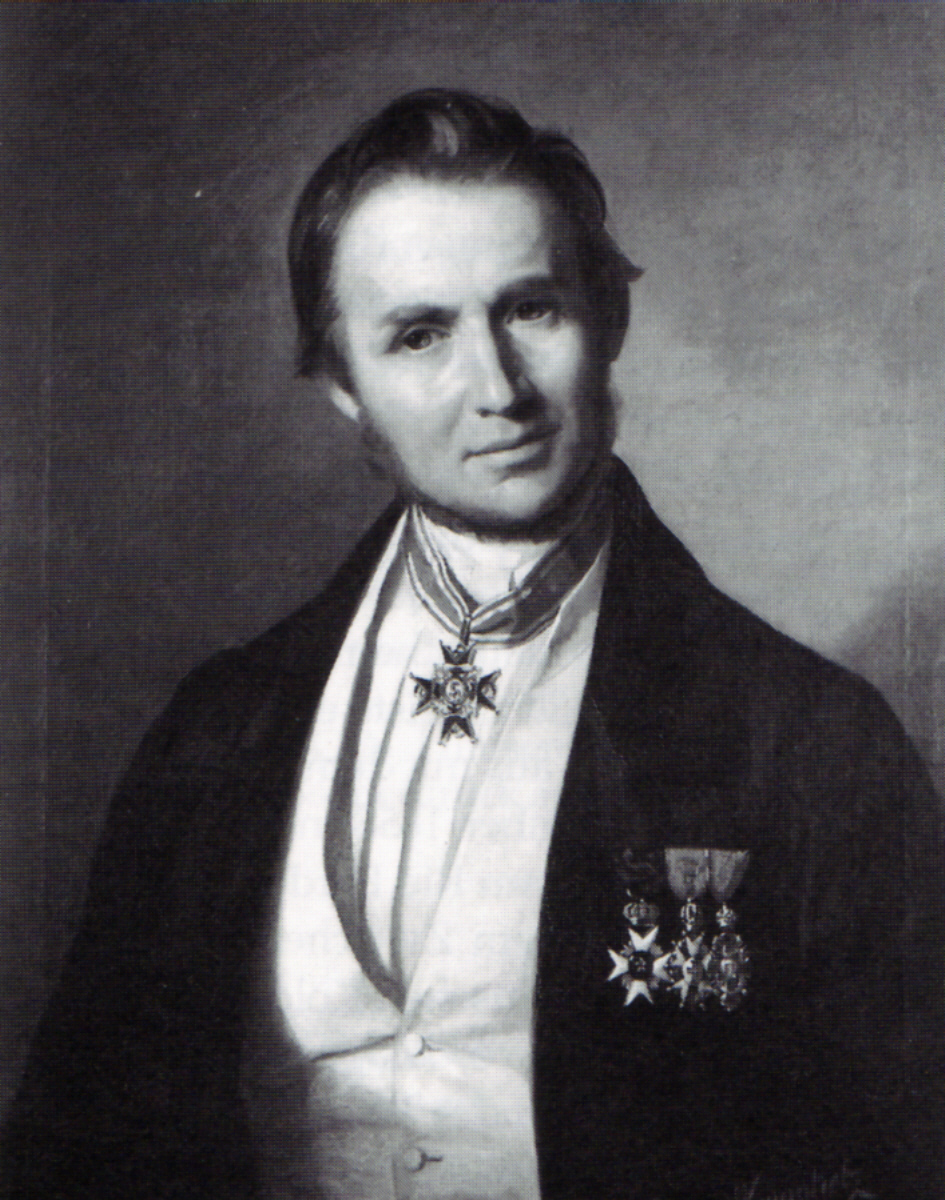
Robert Christian Avé-Lallemant, Knight of the Order of Christ

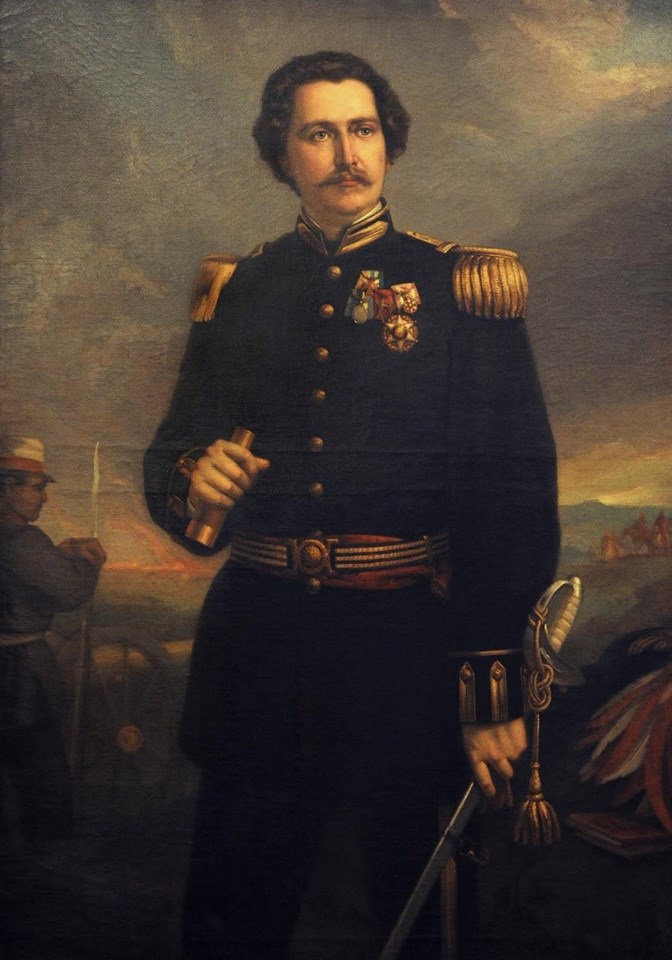
Alfredo d'Escragnolle Taunay, Viscount of Taunay, Knight of the Order of Christ

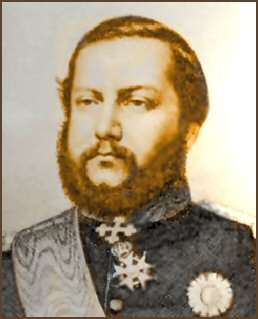
Francisco Solano López, Field Marshal and President of Paraguay wearing the badge of Commander of the Order. Ironically, he became enemy of the Brazilian Empire during the Paraguayan War.

=== Other recipients ===
- Afonso, Prince Imperial of Brazil
- Leonel Martiniano de Alencar, Baron of Alencar
- José Luís Mena Barreto
- Antônio Ferreira Viçoso
- Francisco de Sales Torres Homem, Viscount of Inhomirim
- Isabel, Princess Imperial of Brazil
- Prince Ludwig August of Saxe-Coburg and Gotha
- Gonçalves de Magalhães, Viscount of Araguaia
- Pedro Afonso, Prince Imperial of Brazil
- José Antônio Moreira, Count of Ipanema
- Manuel Marques de Sousa, Count of Porto Alegre
- Manuel de Araújo Porto-Alegre, Baron of Santo Ângelo
- Manuel Pinto de Sousa Dantas, President of the Council of Ministers
- Ângelo Moniz da Silva Ferraz, Baron of Uruguaiana
- Lafayette Rodrigues Pereira
- João Henrique Ulrich Júnior

== See also ==
- Order of Christ (Portugal)
- Order of Christ (Holy See)
- Order of Christ (Kongo)
