= João Henrique Ulrich Júnior =

Brazilian businessman

João Henrique Ulrich Júnior Knight of the Order of Christ
- Born: 22 November 1850; Rio de Janeiro, Brazil
- Died: 24 January 1895; Lisbon, Portugal
- Occupation: Brazilian businessman
- Spouse: Cristina d'Orta Ennes

João Henrique Ulrich Júnior (Rio de Janeiro, 22 November 1850 – Lisbon, 24 January 1895) was a Brazilian businessman. He married Maria Cristina d'Orta Ennes in Lisbon in 1879.

He was a Knight of the Order of Christ, Commander of the Spanish Order of Isabella the Catholic, Lieutenant Governor of the Land Credit Company, Vice-Consul of Brazil, Director-Treasurer of the Geographical Society (of which he was one of the founders), Director of the Minas de Santa Eufemia, Director of the National Tobacco Company and secretary of an organization providing housing for homeless children.
