= Niterói (magazine) =

Brazilian magazine

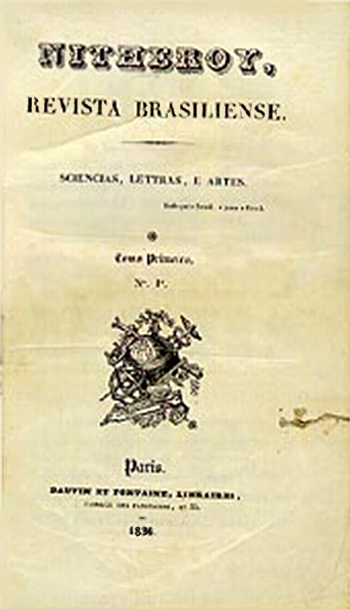
Front cover of the first issue of Niterói

Niterói: Revista Brasiliense (Portuguese for Niterói: Brazilian Magazine) was a magazine created in 1836 by three of the most prominent Brazilian writers at the time: Gonçalves de Magalhães, Porto Alegre and Torres Homem. It was edited in Paris, France.

Only two issues of the magazine were published before it became defunct.

== Historical ==
During the Regency period (1831–1840) of Brazil, the country saw a boom on the publication of periodicals. Due to the historical circumstances of the consolidation of institutions, politics and the own national territory, most of the periodicals at the time had political themes. Niterói, however, was an exception, since it discussed sciences, arts and literature. It is now considered to be a forerunner of the Romantic movement in Brazil.

== Editions ==
The magazine discussed numerous themes, from comets to the slavist economy of Brazil. In the first issue, Gonçalves de Magalhães published a manifesto named Discurso Sobre a História da Literatura no Brasil, in which he exposed to the Brazilian nation the ideals of the then-new Romantic movement.

Niterói's initial print run was very limited and the magazine's activity ceased down after Gonçalves de Magalhães was fired from his post at the Brazilian legation in France and had to return to Brazil due to divergences with its chief, Luís Moutinho.
