= Carlos Magalhães de Azeredo =

Brazilian writer (1872–1963)

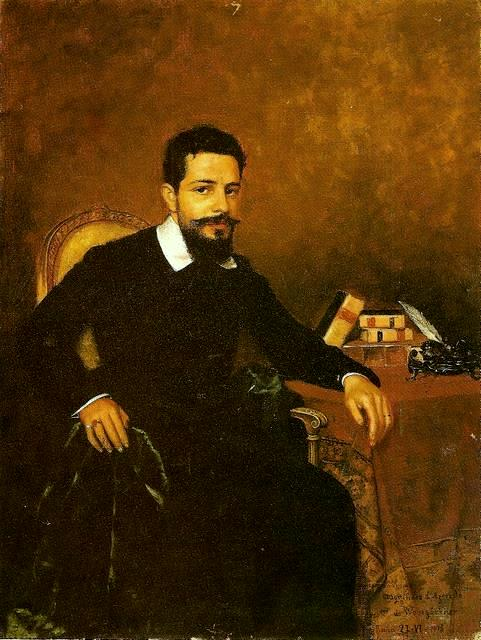
- A portrait of Azeredo made in 1903 by Pedro Weingärtner
- Born: September 7, 1872; Rio de Janeiro, Brazil
- Died: November 4, 1963 (aged 91); Rome, Italy
- Education: University of São Paulo
- Occupations: Poet, short story writer, journalist, diplomat
- Writing career
- Movement: Parnassianism

Carlos Magalhães de Azeredo (September 7, 1872 – November 4, 1963) was a Brazilian poet, short story writer, diplomat and journalist. He founded and occupied the 9th chair of the Brazilian Academy of Letters, from 1897 until his death in 1963, thus being the academic that occupied his chair for the longest time (66 years) and the youngest founder of the Academy (age 25).

== Life ==
Azeredo was born in Rio de Janeiro, in 1872, to Caetano Pinto de Azeredo (who died three months after Carlos' birth) and Leopoldina Magalhães de Azeredo. Since as a young man, Azeredo would write – when he was 12 years old he wrote a poetry book named Inspirações da Infância, that was never published, and with 17 years old he started to trade letters with Machado de Assis and Mário de Alencar.

He made his primary studies in the Colégio São Carlos, in Porto, Portugal, later returning to Brazil (more precisely to the city of Itu), where he finished them at the Colégio São Luís.

He entered the Faculdade de Direito da Universidade de São Paulo in 1888, graduating in 1893. Two years later, he entered the diplomatic career, where he served as minister in Uruguay, Cuba, Greece and the Holy See. He would stay permanently in Italy, until his death.

== Works ==
Azeredo was a very prolific writer, but his works remained unknown for some time in Brazil. In December 2003, former Brazilian President and then-ambassador of Brazil in Italy Itamar Franco found some then-unpublished writings by him, delivering them to the Brazilian Academy of Letters.

=== Poetry ===
- Procelárias (1898)
- Portugal no Centenário das Índias (1898)
- O Poema da Paz, na Aurora do Século XX (1901)
- Horas Sagradas (1903)
- Odes e Elegias (1904)
- O Hino de Púrpura (1906)
- Vida e Sonho (1919)
- A Volta do Imperador (1920)
- Laudes do Jardim Real de Atenas (1921)

=== Short stories ===
- Alma Primitiva (1895)
- Baladas e Fantasias (1900)
- Quase Parábola (1913)
- Ariadne (1922)
- Casos do Amor e do Instinto (1924)
- O Eterno e o Efêmero (1936)

=== Other ===
- José de Alencar (essay – 1895)
- Homens e Livros (studies – 1902)

| Preceded by Gonçalves de Magalhães (patron) | Brazilian Academy of Letters – Occupant of the 9th chair 1897–1963 | Succeeded by Marques Rebelo |
