= Teatro João Caetano =

Theater in Rio de Janeiro, Brazil

João Caetano Theater
- Teatro João Caetano
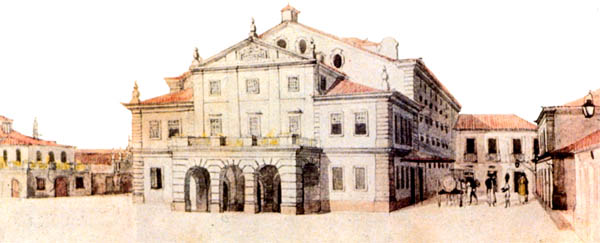
- The theater, c.1830, by Jean-Baptiste Debret.

- Location within Rio de Janeiro Location within Brazil

General information
- Architectural style: Neoclassic
- Location: Rio de Janeiro, Rio de Janeiro, Brazil
- Coordinates: 22°54′22″S 43°10′56″W
- Inaugurated: October 12th, 1813

Other information
- Seating capacity: 1 139

The João Caetano Theater (Portuguese: Teatro João Caetano) is located in Tiradentes Square, in the Brazilian city of Rio de Janeiro. It offers 1,139 seats, including 605 in the audience, 117 in the noble balcony and 417 in the simple balcony. It is the oldest playhouse in the city.

== History ==
The João Caetano Theater was inaugurated on October 12, 1813 by Dom John VI under the name Royal Theater of São João (Real Theatro de São João) in celebration of his son Dom Pedro I's 15th birthday. The inauguration included the performance of O Julgamento de Nunes by the Portuguese writer and playwright Dom Gastão Fausto da Câmara Coutinho, with music by Bernardo José de Souza e Queiroz, the theater's official composer. Dom John VI became a frequent attendee of the theater, which made the place the meeting point for political and social life.

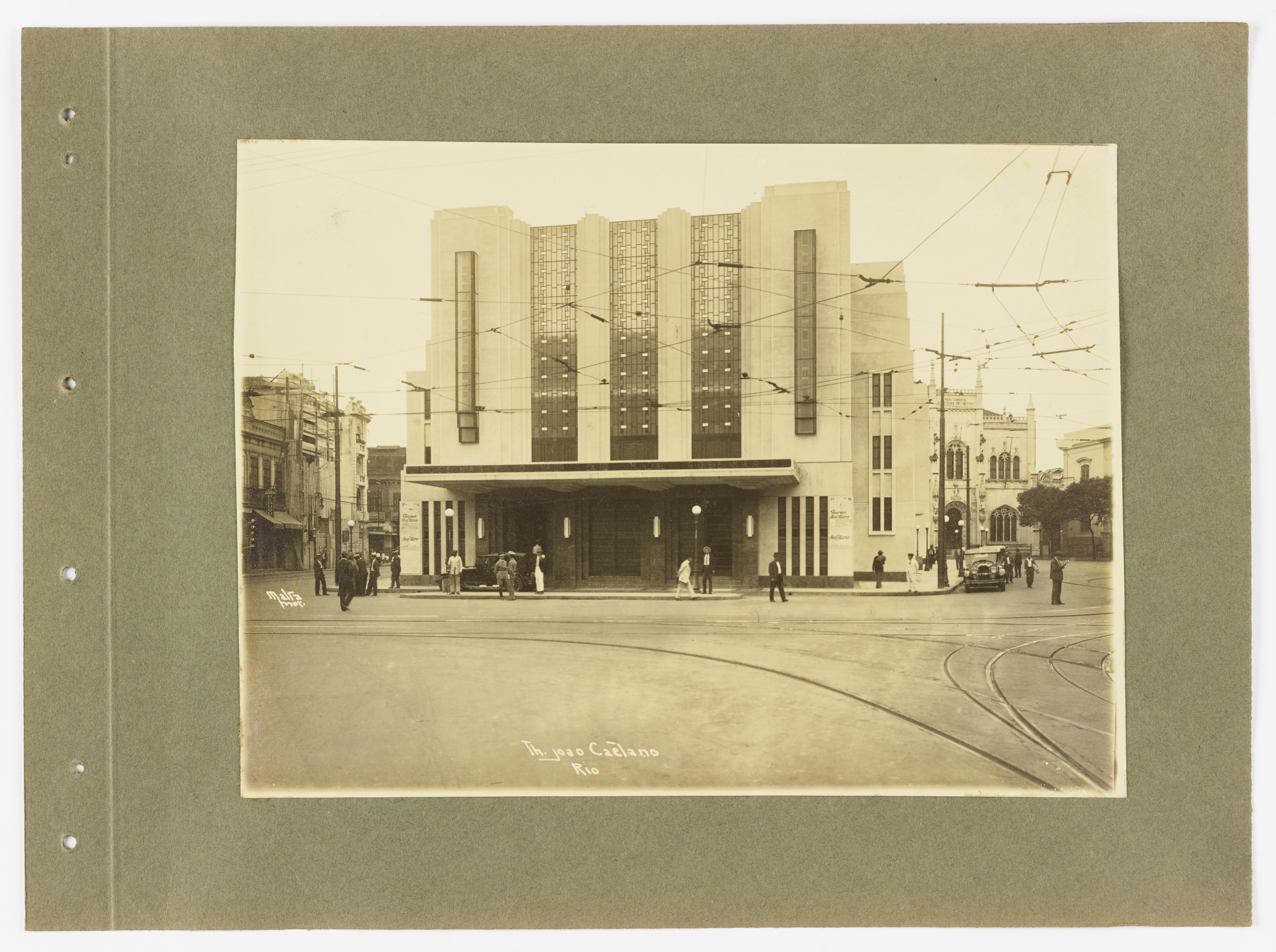
Picture of the theater between 1928 and 1932 by Augusto Malta.

Built with stones destined for Rio de Janeiro's cathedral, the construction occurred on land acquired by Fernando José de Almeida; engineer João Manuel da Silva was responsible for the neoclassical design. The facade resembled the Royal Theater of São Carlos in Lisbon, designed by José da Costa e Silva, who came to Rio de Janeiro in 1812.

In 1821, Dom Pedro I became Prince Regent and swore allegiance to the Portuguese Constitution from one of the theater's balconies. In the same year, the building was painted inside and out. In 1824, the first Brazilian Constitution was promulgated at the venue in the presence of Emperor Dom Pedro I and Empress Leopoldina. During the ceremony, at the end of the performance of the sacred drama Vida de Santo Hermenegildo, the theater started to catch fire.

The theater reopened on January 22, 1826, Empress Leopoldina's birthday, under the name Imperial Theater of São Pedro de Alcântara (Imperial Theatro de São Pedro de Alcântara). The ceremony included the opera Tancredo, by Gioachino Rossini. It closed for the completion of the renovation and reopened on April 4 of the same year. It had 100 boxes distributed in four sections with a capacity for 300 people and separated by a golden railing from the audience, which accommodated around 600 spectators. The imperial box decorated with the coat of arms of the Empire of Brazil, gilded carvings and blue silk curtains embroidered in gold stood in the center. Lighting was provided by 220 wax candles housed in glass sleeves.

The theater remained temporarily closed in 1831 and José Fernando de Almeida, son of the previous owner, leased the venue to the Banco do Brasil. It reopened on May 3rd under the name of Fluminense Constitutional Theater (Theatro Constitucional Fluminense) with a performance of the play Tolita ou O Império das Leis. On May 3, 1832, the drama A reconciliação das duas tribos pelo poder da inocência played at the theater. João Caetano dos Santos, an important Brazilian actor of the 19th century, joined the cast. In 1838, in order to fully settle the debt, Banco do Brasil auctioned off the property to Manuel Maria Bregaro and Joaquim Valério Tavares, who formed a joint stock company composed of forty shareholders, including João Caetano.

In October 1838, it closed again for renovation. The second floor was built and the ceiling was painted by Olivier. On September 7, 1839, it reopened under the name Theater of São Pedro de Alcântara (Theatro de São Pedro de Alcântara). In 1843, João Caetano became the main shareholder. On August 9, 1851, the second fire occurred in the theater after a performance of O captativo de Fez, by João Antônio da Costa. On August 18, 1952, the place reopened in the presence of Dom Pedro II and Empress Teresa Cristina. On January 26, 1856, another fire destroyed the entire building. On January 3, 1857, it opened again with the drama Affonso Pietro, starring João Caetano. In the 1880s, two other renovations were made.

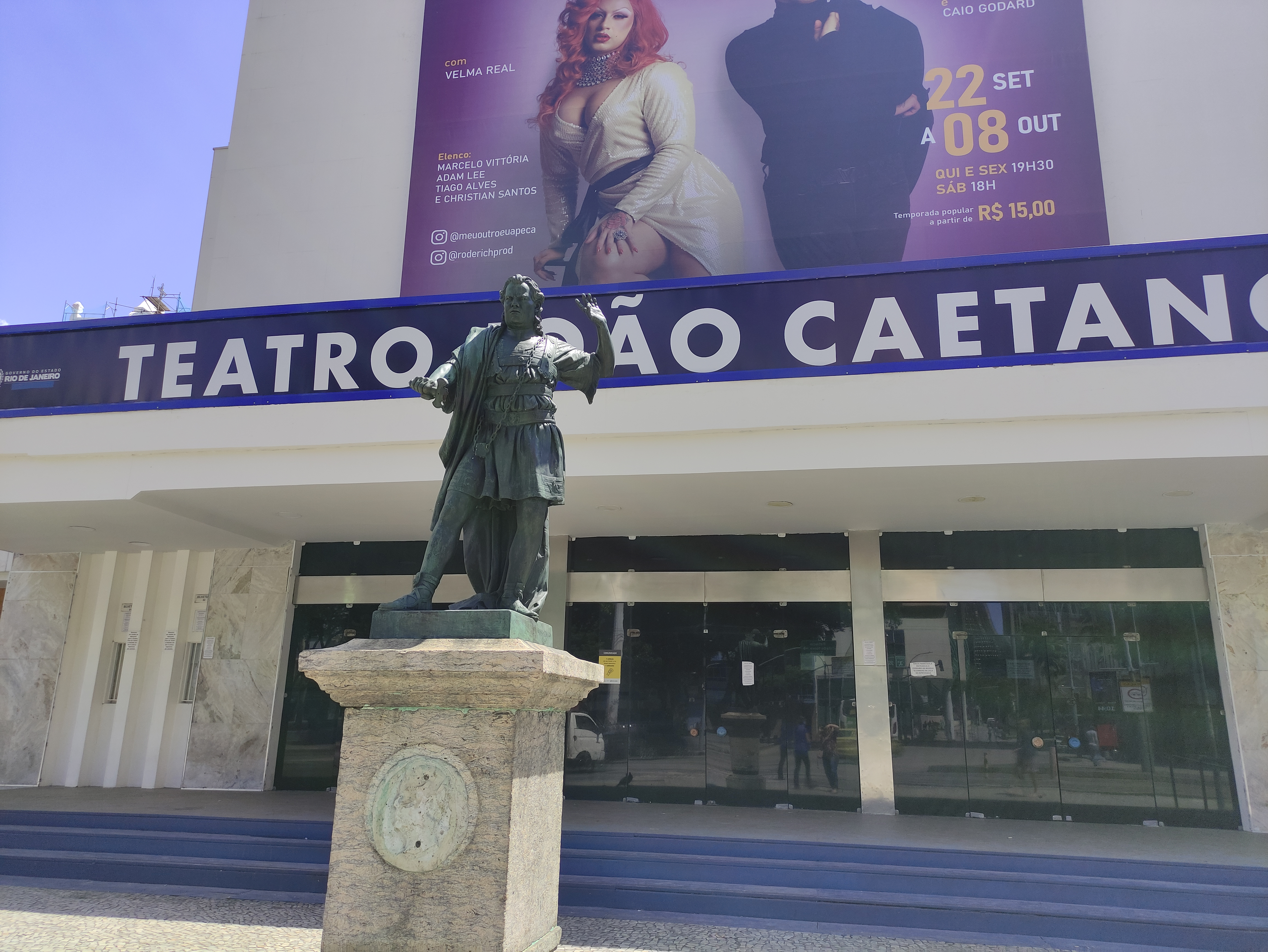
Statue of João Caetano in front of the theater.

On May 3, 1891, a life-size statue of João Caetano was inaugurated in a square in front of the Imperial Academy of Fine Arts (Academia Imperial de Belas Artes). In 1916, it was transferred to Tiradentes Square. On June 14, 1898, Banco do Brasil became the owner of the property. In 1916, the venue was renovated by the engineer Silveira da Mota with the construction company Andrade Lima & Cia; F. R. Moreira & Cia were responsible for the lighting and electrical equipment. On December 22, 1920, it became property of the City Hall of the Federal District. On August 24, 1923, by Decree No. 1891, it was renamed João Caetano Theater (Teatro João Caetano) in honor of the actor. It was demolished, rebuilt and inaugurated on June 28, 1930 with the operetta Rose Marie.

In the 1940s and 1950s, the João Caetano hosted several musical revues and carnival balls. In the 1960s, the theater underwent a three-year restoration project based on a design by Roberto Thompson Motta and led by engineer Stélio de Morais. It reopened on September 7, 1965. In July 1989, the roof lining on the second balcony collapsed onto the chairs during a concert by the singer Belchior, which was caused by widespread leaks in the roof and poor maintenance of the building.

In 2009, new interventions included the restoration of the two Di Cavalcanti panels and the refurbishment of the foyers, audience and balconies. A new carpet and new armchairs were purchased. In 2022, the panels were renovated again to restore the original colors. In 2023, the theater closed for renovations that included modernizing the cooling system and installing solar energy panels.

Throughout almost two centuries, renowned artists have performed at the João Caetano Theater. On June 25, 1885 and January 6, 1886, Eleonora Duse and Sarah Bernhard performed at the venue. Besides them, Fernanda Montenegro, Paulo Autran, Bibi Ferreira, Fernanda Torres, Marco Nanini, Maria Bethânia and Gal Costa have staged shows at the theater.

== See also ==
- Carlos Gomes Theater
- Municipal Theater of Rio de Janeiro
