= Manuel de Araújo Porto-Alegre, Baron of Santo Ângelo =

Brazilian poet, playwright and painter (1806–1879)

Baron of Santo Ângelo
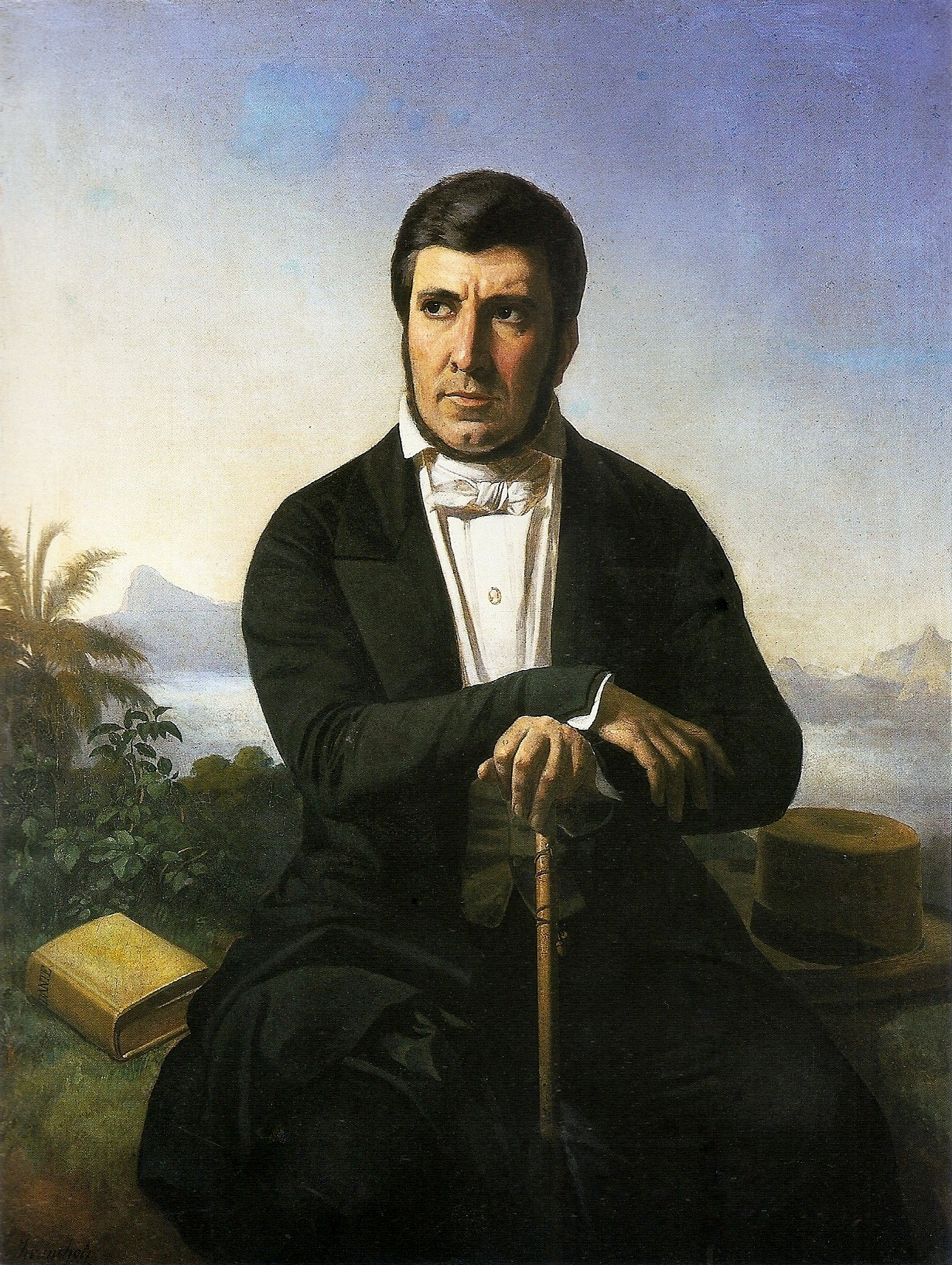
- Porto-Alegre by Ferdinand Krumholz, c. 1848
- Born: Manuel José de Araújo; 29 November 1806; Rio Pardo, Colonial Brazil
- Died: 30 December 1879 (aged 73); Lisbon, Kingdom of Portugal
- Education: Imperial Academy of Fine Arts
- Occupations: Writer, painter, caricaturist, professor, diplomat, architect
- Spouse: Ana Paulina Delamare
- Children: Carlota Porto-Alegre; Paulo Porto-Alegre
- Writing career
- Pen name: Tibúrcio do Amarante
- Period: 19th century
- Genres: Poetry, theatre, painting, drawing, editorial cartoon
- Movement: Romanticism
- Coat of Arms of the Baron of Santo Ângelo

Manuel José de Araújo Porto-Alegre, Baron of Santo Ângelo (29 November 1806 – 30 December 1879), was a Brazilian Romantic writer, painter, architect, diplomat and professor, considered to be one of the first Brazilian editorial cartoonists ever. He is the patron of the 32nd chair of the Brazilian Academy of Letters.

== Life ==
Porto-Alegre was born Manuel José de Araújo in Rio Pardo, Rio Grande do Sul, to Francisco José de Araújo and Francisca Antônia Viana. He would change his name to Manuel de Araújo Pitangueira during the independence of Brazil, citing nativist reasons. Later on, he finally changed it to Manuel de Araújo Porto-Alegre.

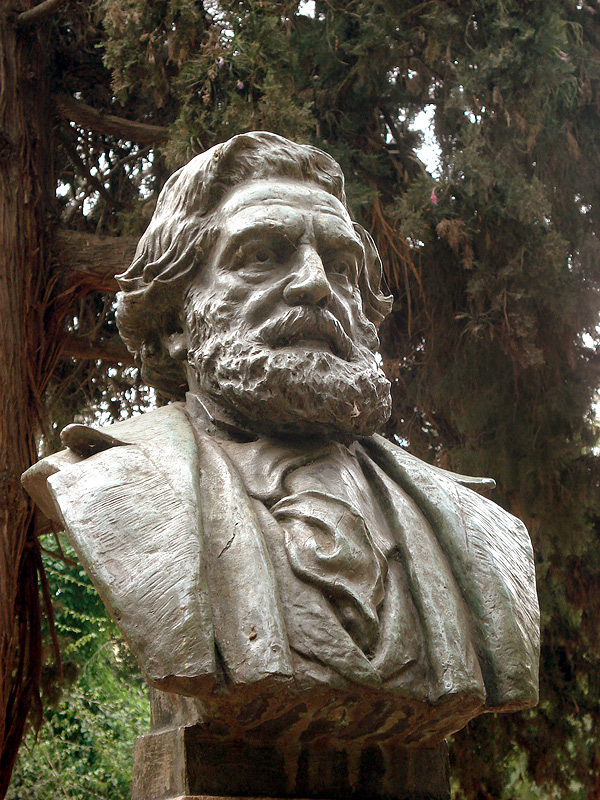
A herma of Porto-Alegre in Porto Alegre, Rio Grande do Sul, Brazil

In 1826, he moved to Rio de Janeiro, in order to study painting with Jean-Baptiste Debret at the Imperial Academy of Fine Arts. He also studied at what is now the Academia Militar das Agulhas Negras and took a medicine course and philosophy. In 1831, he left Brazil along with Debret to Europe, in order to improve his painting techniques. In 1835, he went to Italy, where he met Gonçalves de Magalhães, another Brazilian poet. Porto-Alegre and Magalhães would create in France, in the year of 1837, a short-lived magazine named Niterói, alongside Francisco de Sales Torres Homem. Also in 1837, he became history painting teacher at the Imperial Academy of Fine Arts, in a post that would last until 1848, when he became a drawing teacher at the Academia Militar das Agulhas Negras, and started doing his first caricatures. In 1838, he married Ana Paulina Delamare, having two children with her: Carlota Porto-Alegre (the future wife of painter Pedro Américo) and future diplomat Paulo Porto-Alegre.

In 1840 he was named the official painter and decorator of emperor Pedro II's palace. He decorated the imperial palace in Petrópolis, the wedding of Pedro II with Teresa Cristina of the Two Sicilies and the emperor's coronation. He was decorated with the Order of Christ and the Order of the Rose.

Reuniting with Gonçalves de Magalhães and Torres Homem, he founded a periodical named Minerva Brasiliense, that lasted from 1843 to 1845. He would publish in this periodical his poem Brasiliana. In 1844, alongside Torres Homem, he founded the humoristic magazine Lanterna Mágica, where he published his caricatures.

In 1849, Porto-Alegre founded the magazine Guanabara, alongside Joaquim Manuel de Macedo and Gonçalves Dias. The magazine, considered the official journal of the Romantic movement in Brazil, lasted until 1856.

In 1852, he entered the political career, assuming a position as a substitute councilman in the Municipal Chamber of Rio de Janeiro, lending service in the areas of urbanism and public health. He exercised this post until 1854, the year when he became the headmaster of the Imperial Academy of Fine Arts, lasting until 1857.

In 1860, Porto-Alegre entered the diplomatic career, where he served as the consul of the Empire of Brazil in the Kingdom of Prussia, in the Kingdom of Saxony and later in Portugal, where he died. (Porto-Alegre's remains were brought to Brazil in 1922.)

He was granted the title of Baron of Santo Ângelo by emperor Pedro II in 1874, and was a member of the Brazilian Historic and Geographic Institute.

== Spiritism ==
While in Dresden in 1865, Porto-Alegre wrote a letter to Joaquim Manuel de Macedo, then-tutor of Princess Isabel's children, in which he reveals that he became a Spiritist and was able to psychograph messages from the Underworld, and Isabel would ask him "who was [her] guardian spirit". The letter, now being kept at the Brazilian National Archives, has 12 pages.

== Literary works ==
=== Poetry ===
- Ode Sáfica (1830 — dedicated to Jean-Baptiste Debret)
- Canto Inaugural (1855)
- Brasiliana (1863)
- Colombo (epic poem — 1866)

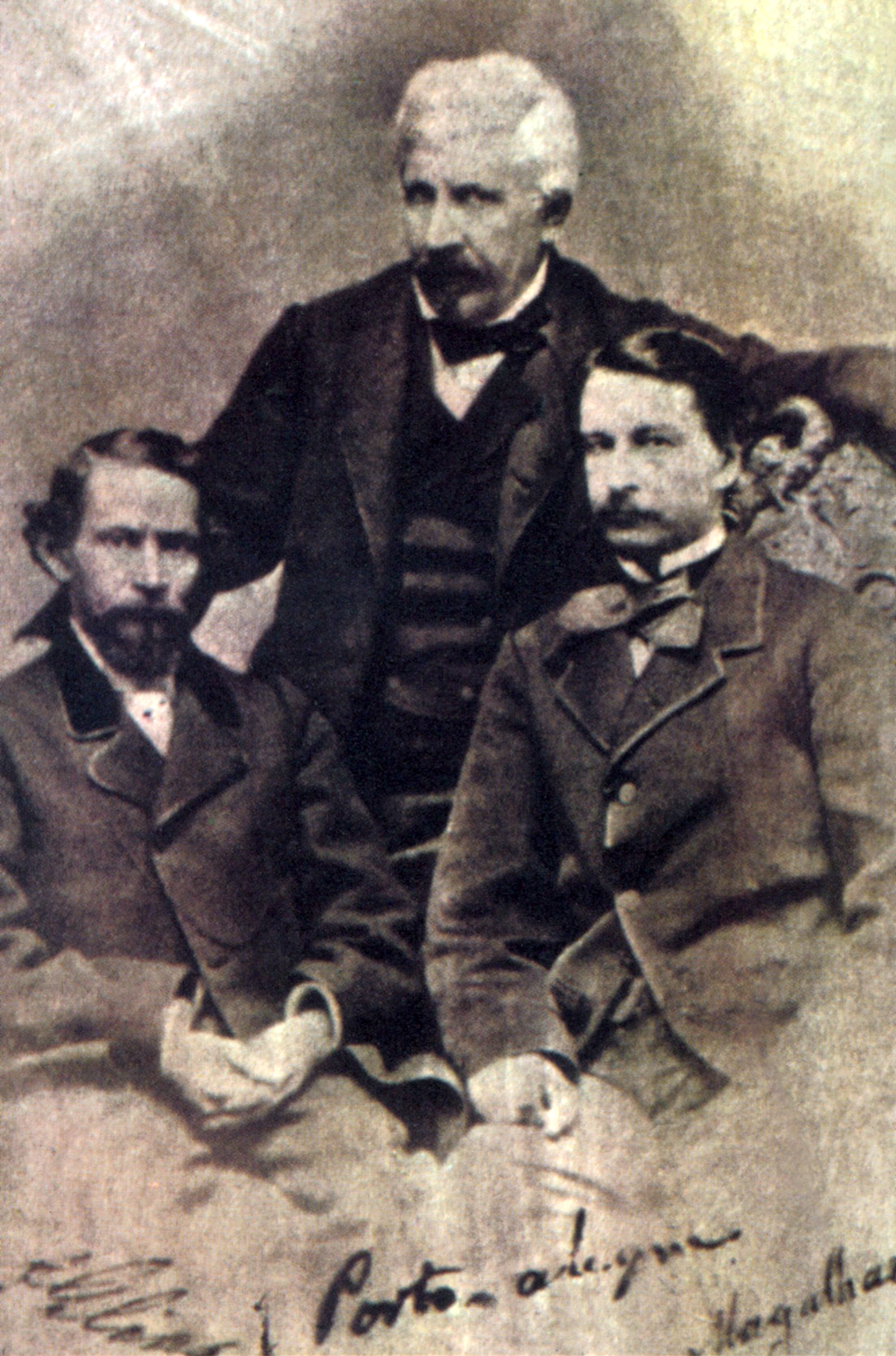
From left to right: Gonçalves Dias, Porto-Alegre and Gonçalves de Magalhães, on a picture dating from circa 1858

=== Theater plays ===
- Prólogo Dramático (1837)
- Angélica e Firmino (1845)
- A Destruição das Florestas (1845)
- A Estátua Amazônica (1851)
- A Restauração de Pernambuco (1852)
- A Noite de São João (1857)
- Cenas de Penafiel (1858)
- Os Judas (1859)
- O Prestígio da Lei (1859)
- Os Lobisomens (1862)
- Os Voluntários da Pátria (1877)

=== Fiction ===
- Excertos das Memórias e Viagens do Coronel Bonifácio do Amarante (under pen name Tibúrcio do Amarante) (1848)

=== Translations ===
- Electra by Euripides
- Lucrèce Borgia by Victor Hugo
- Christine of Sweden by Alexandre Dumas

== Gallery ==
=== Portraits ===
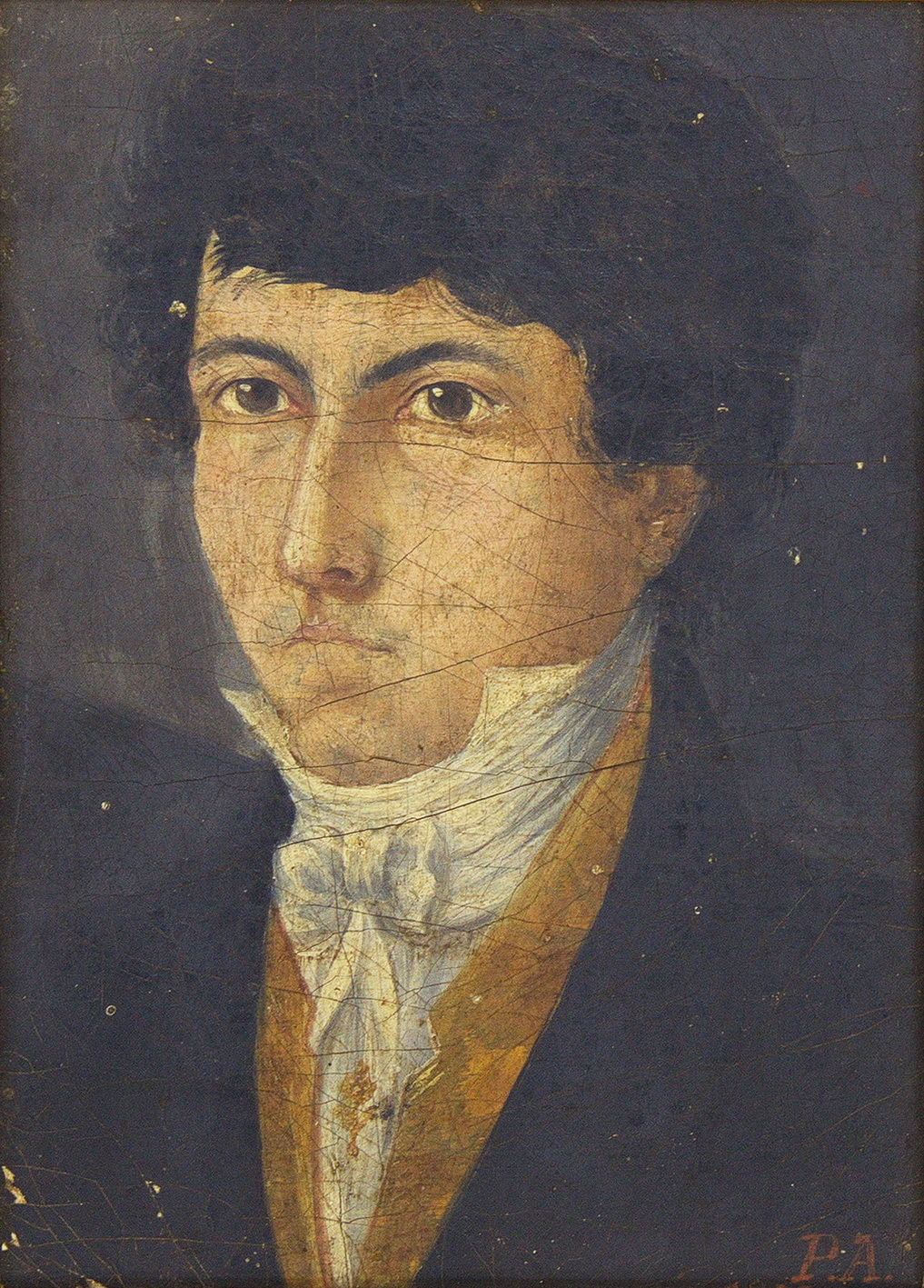
Self-portrait, c. 1823

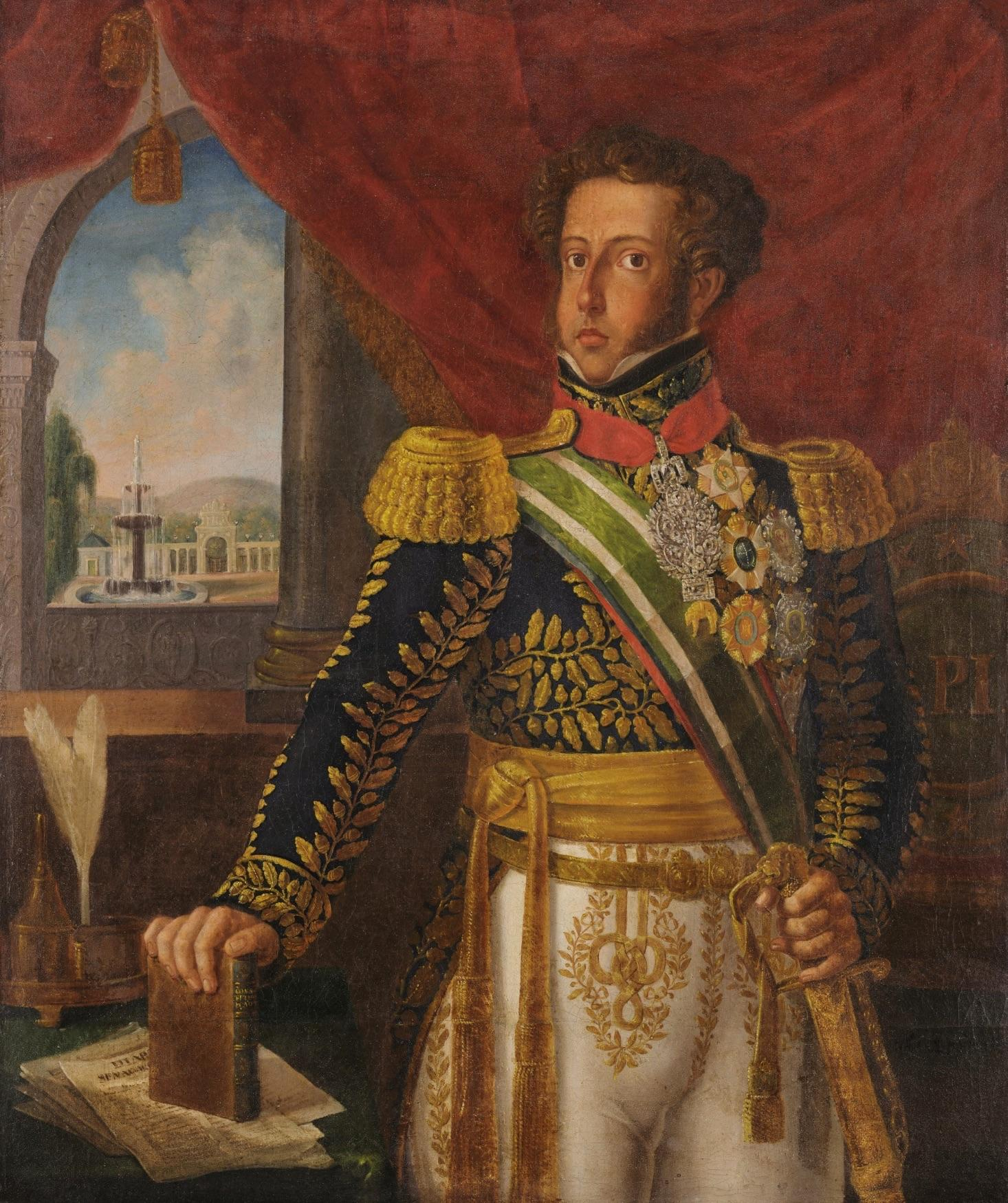
Portrait of Emperor Pedro I, 1826

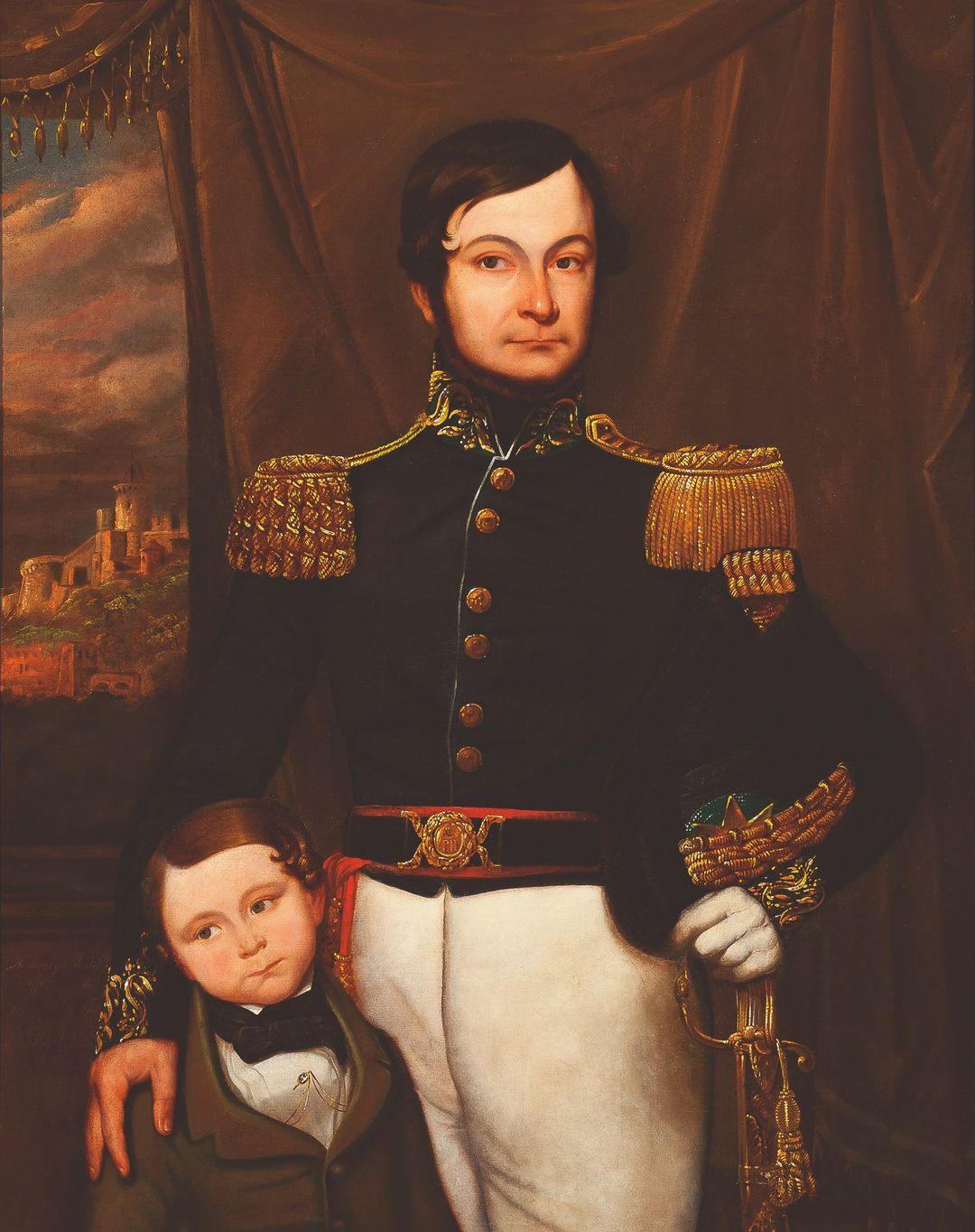
Portrait of Lieutenant Colonel José Simeão de Oliveira and his son João Baptista, c. 1840

=== Others ===
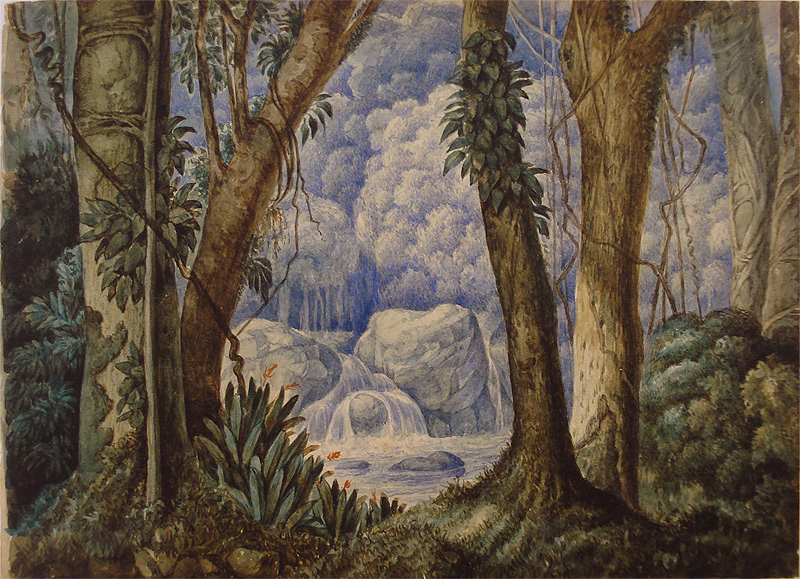
Brazilian Jungle, watercolor painting

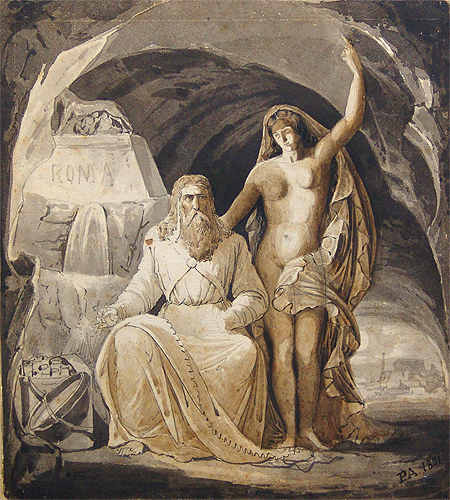
Study for a Decorative Panel, oil and nankeen

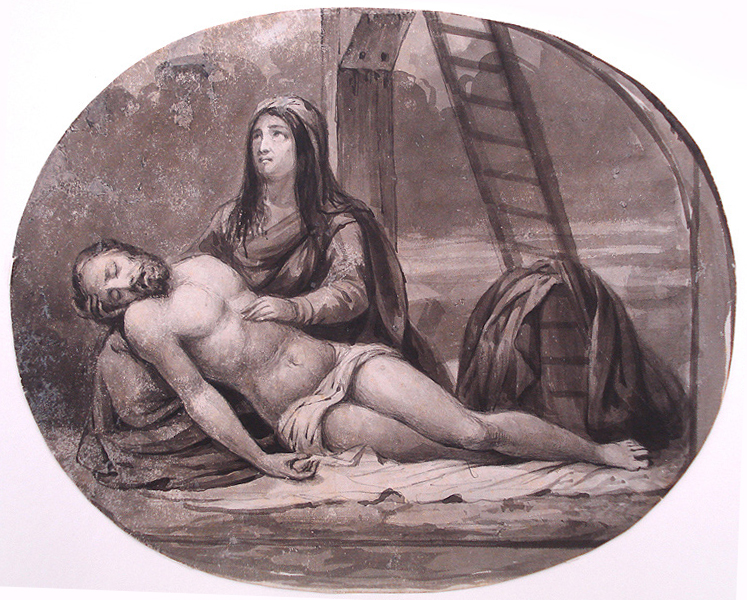
Pietà

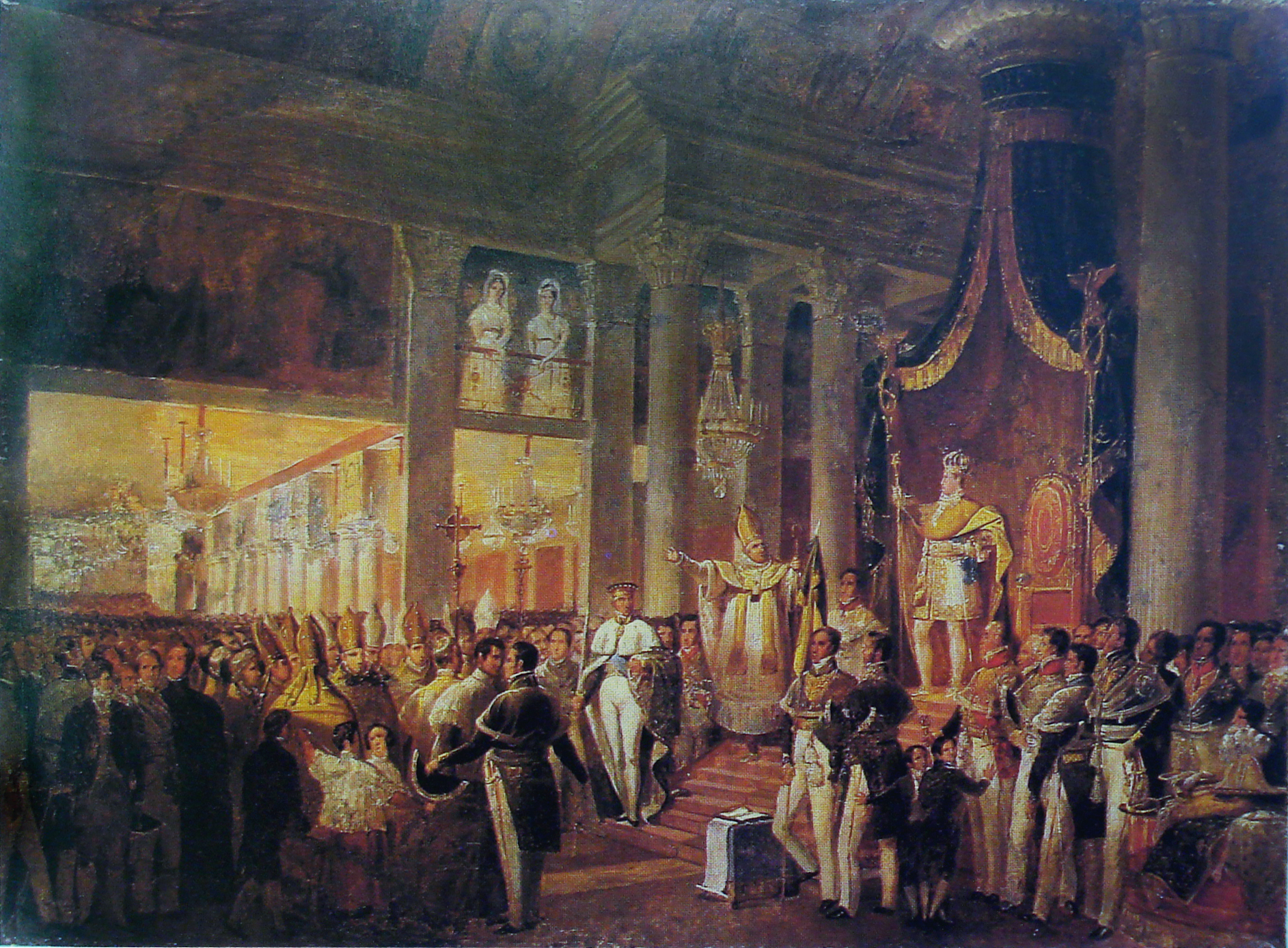
Study for Pedro II's Sagration, oil painting

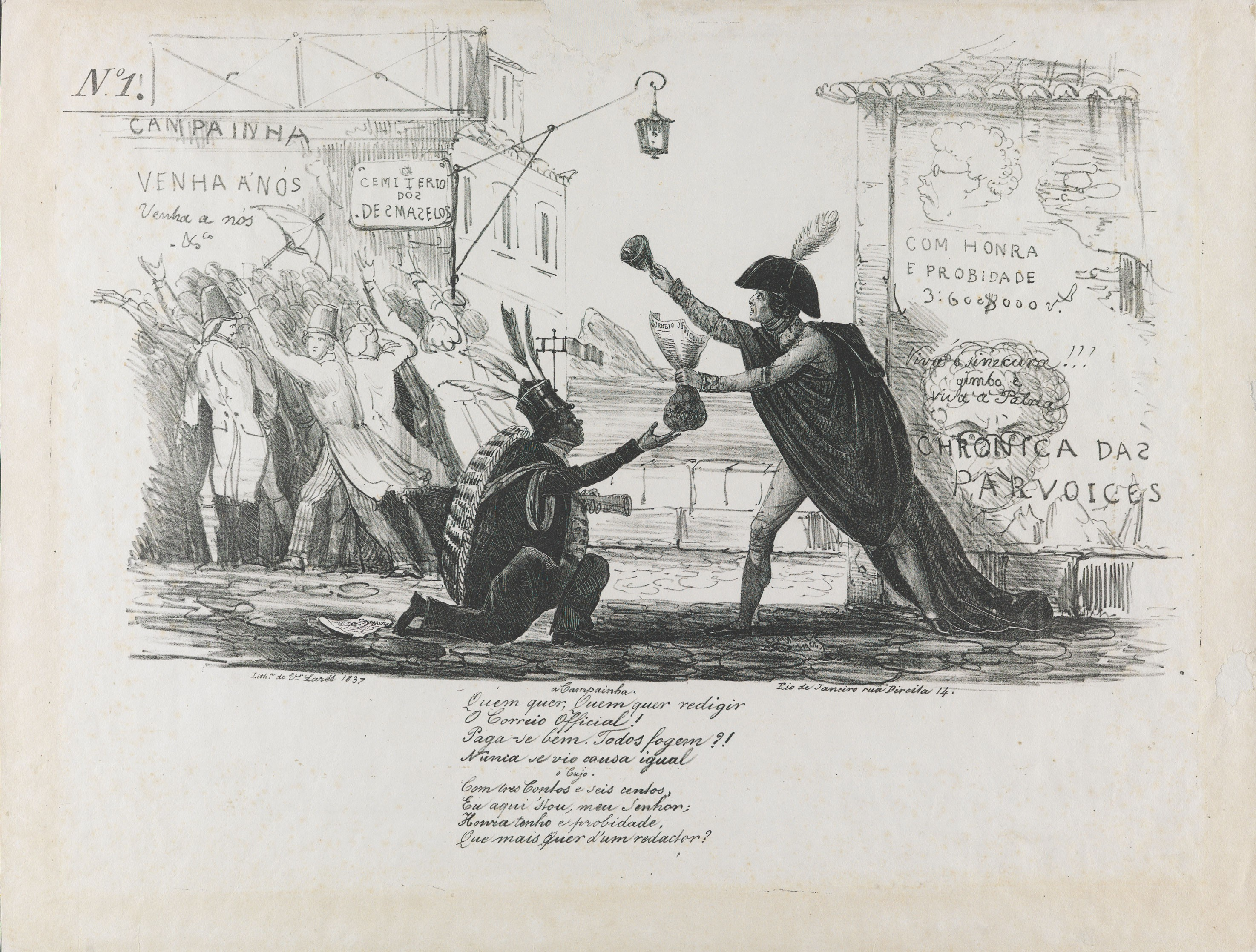
This caricature that satirizes the Regency period of the Empire of Brazil (1831–1840) was made by Porto-Alegre, and is considered to be the first Brazilian editorial cartoon ever

Preceded by New creation	Baron of Santo Ângelo; 1874 — 1879	Succeeded by None

Preceded by New creation	Brazilian Academy of Letters - Patron of the 32nd chair	Succeeded by Carlos de Laet (founder)
