= António José, ou O Poeta e a Inquisição =

António José, ou O Poeta e a Inquisição (in English: António José, or The Poet and the Inquisition) is a theatre play by Gonçalves de Magalhães, the first Brazilian Romantic author. Written in and performed for the first time in 1838, it was published in that same year. It is considered to be the first play of a "pure" Brazilian theatre.

Its plot is loosely based on the final days of Luso-Brazilian Jewish playwright António José da Silva, who was garroted and later burned by the Inquisition.
