= Francisco de Sales Torres Homem, Viscount of Inhomirim =

The Viscount of Inhomirim
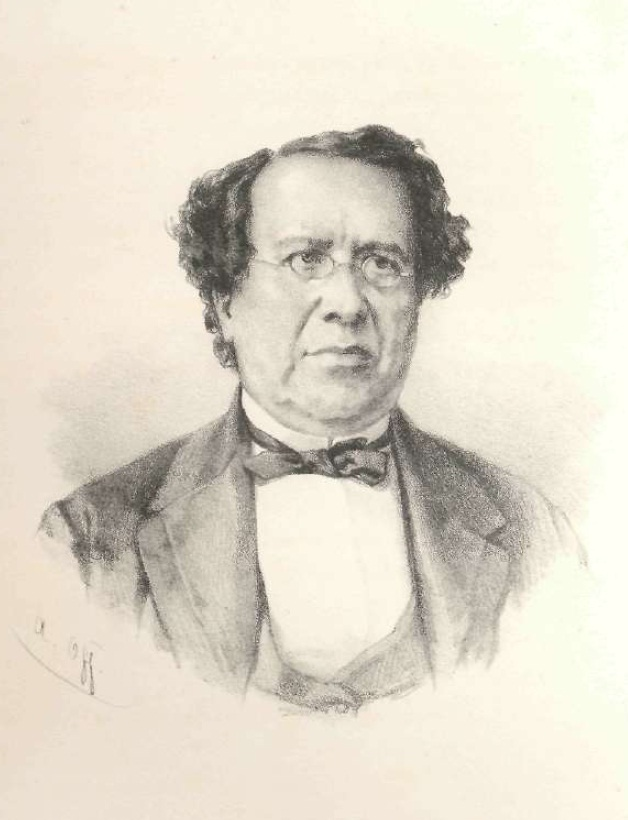
- The Viscount of Inhomirim, c. 1870

Minister of Finance
- In office September 29, 1870 – March 7, 1871
- Monarch: Pedro II
- Prime Minister: The Marquis of São Vicente
- Preceded by: The Viscount of Itaboraí
- Succeeded by: The Viscount of Rio Branco
- In office December 12, 1858 – August 10, 1859
- Monarch: Pedro II
- Prime Minister: The Viscount of Abaeté
- Preceded by: Bernardo de Sousa Franco
- Succeeded by: The Baron of Uruguaiana

Personal details
- Born: 29 January 1812 Rio de Janeiro, Colonial Brazil
- Died: 3 June 1876 (aged 64) Paris, France

Francisco de Sales Torres Homem, Viscount of Inhomirim (January 29, 1812 – June 3, 1876), was a medical doctor, lawyer, journalist, romantic writer, deputy, senator, top officer of the National Treasury, president of the Bank of Brazil and Minister of Treasury. He was the only Afro-Brazilian ever to have been in charge of the economy of Brazil throughout its history.

== Biography ==
Francisco de Sales Torres Homem was born on January 29, 1812, at Rio de Janeiro, Brazil. His father, Apolinário Torres Homem, was a shady businessman, married to María Patrícia, a mulatto traveling market salesman, nicknamed You kill me.

After finishing his career in medicine at the Medical-Surgical Academy at Rio de Janeiro in 1832, he became enrolled by Evaristo Ferreira da Veiga at the Society for the Defense of Freedom and National Independence, a political group related to the moderate liberal party, and asked to write political articles for some journals. At first he was unwilling to perform these duties, according to him because he lacked knowledge and interest on politics; however, Ferreira da Veiga made him change his mind after praising his first article written for the journal Aurora Fluminense. He later traveled to Paris to study law, with a focus on political economy.

He maintained a close friendship since childhood with Gonçalves de Magalhães, who made him get into the Historical Institute of Paris to write a dissertation in 1834 along with poet Manuel de Araújo Porto-alegre on the state of sciences in Brazil entitled Resumo da História da Literatura, das Ciências e das Artes no Brasil por três brasileiros, membros do Instituto Histórico (Brief Resume on the History of Literature, Sciences and Arts in Brazil by three Brazilians, members of the Historical Institute). In 1836, along with Gonçalves de Magalhães, Araújo Porto-alegre and João Manuel Pereira da Silva, he creates Niterói, a journal considered the initial landmark of the literary romantic movement of Brazil.

In 1837 he returned to Brazil. He wrote for the Journal of Political and Literary Debates (Jornal dos Debates Políticos e Literários) from 1837 to 1838; his peers from France also collaborated in this journal. Jornal dos Debates was a journal which reflected the liberal thought opposed to regent Diogo Antônio Feijó's government, having a considerable influence of its writing on the people. Torres Homem went later on to write for other journals: Despertador (1838–1841) and Maiorista (1838–1841).

In 1842 he joined the Society of Invisible Patriarchs, a secret revolutionary organization that took up arms against the monarchy. Because of this, Torres Homem was sent to exile for some months in Portugal.

In politics, Torres Homem became a deputy for Ceará (1842–1844) and, later on, for Minas Gerais (1845–1847) and Rio de Janeiro (1848–1850).

In 1849, after being editor for a whole year of a newspaper called Correio Mercantil (Mercantile Post), he publishes in its pages his famous Libelo do Povo (People's Libel); by using Timandro as pen name, Torres Homem criticized the imperial House of Braganza for the mismanagement of Brazil, provoking criticism against him by those who sympathized with the monarchy. His Libelo do povo was a liberal protest against the arbitrary measures used by the crown to suppress the liberal revolt of 1848 in Pernambuco, and to prevent the fulfillment of the promise of independence, "social and political renovation." In 1852, after establishing a Conciliation Ministry, the attacks diminished; however, Torres Homem maintained himself as a firm opponent of the regime.

From December 12, 1858, to October 10, 1859, he became Minister of Treasury. As such, he was considered metalist by being a firm defender of monetary restriction and a coin backed by gold. By 1870 he arrives to the Senate where he defended freedom for all children of slaves, which earned him a year later, the conferment of the Order of Christ, and later, the title of Viscount of Inhomirim.

During the final days of his life, sick with asthma, he again disobeyed the Empire by traveling abroad to treat himself without asking for license. He returned to Brazil and resumed his legislative chores, but his health problems forced him to go to Paris where he died on June 3, 1876.
