= Gonçalves de Magalhães, Viscount of Araguaia =

Brazilian writer

Gonçalves de Magalhães
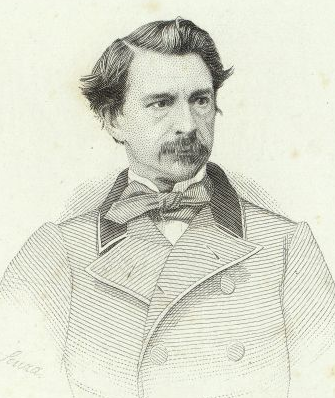
- A drawing of Gonçalves de Magalhães
- Born: Domingos José Gonçalves de Magalhães; August 13, 1811; Rio de Janeiro, Colonial Brazil
- Died: July 10, 1882 (aged 70); Rome, Kingdom of Italy
- Occupations: Poet, playwright, medician, diplomat
- Children: Antônio José Gonçalves de Magalhães de Araguaia
- Writing career
- Period: 1836–1880
- Notable works: A Confederação dos Tamoios, Suspiros Poéticos e Saudades, António José, ou O Poeta e a Inquisição
- Movement: Romanticism

Domingos José Gonçalves de Magalhães, Viscount of Araguaia (August 13, 1811 – July 10, 1882), was a Brazilian poet, playwright, medical doctor and diplomat. He is considered the founder of Romanticism in Brazilian literature, and was a pioneer of Brazilian theatre.

He is the patron of the 9th chair of the Brazilian Academy of Letters.

== Early life ==
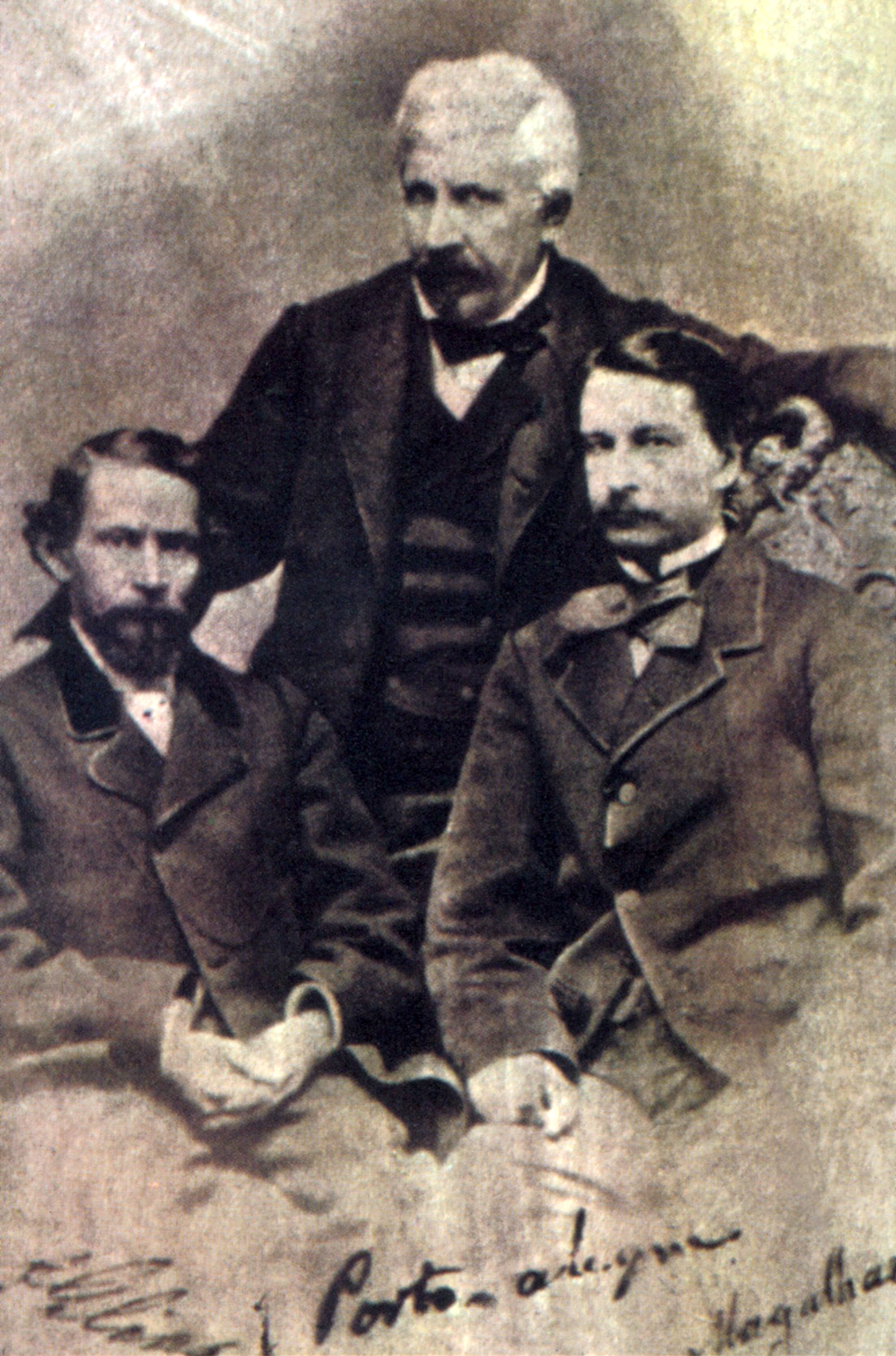
From left to right: Gonçalves Dias, Manuel de Araújo Porto-Alegre and Magalhães, on a picture dating from c. 1858

Domingos José Gonçalves de Magalhães was born in Rio de Janeiro, to Pedro Gonçalves de Magalhães Chaves. His mother's name is unknown. He entered a Medicine course in 1828, graduating in 1832.

== Career ==
In the following year, he travelled to Europe, where he met and befriended Manuel de Araújo Porto-Alegre and was exposed to the Romantic ideals. He wrote in 1836 a Romantic manifesto, Discurso Sobre a História da Literatura no Brasil, and, in the same year, he published the poetry book Suspiros Poéticos e Saudades, the first Romantic work to be written by a Brazilian.

Returning to Brazil in 1837, he wrote two tragic plays: António José, ou O Poeta e a Inquisição in 1838 and Olgiato in 1839. In 1838 he became a Philosophy teacher in the Colégio Pedro II. He founded with Porto-Alegre and Francisco de Sales Torres Homem the short-lived magazine Niterói; only two issues were published.

He began a diplomatic career in 1847, serving as minister in the United States, Argentina, Austria and in the Holy See. He was a chargé d'affaires in the Kingdom of the Two Sicilies, the Piedmont, Russia, and Spain. He was esteemed by Emperor Pedro II, and was decorated with the Order of the Rose, the Order of Christ and the Order of the Southern Cross, and with the title of Baron of Araguaia in 1872, and was elevated to Viscount two years later.

== Personal life ==
Magalhães married Januaria de Sa Pinto Ribeiro. They had a daughter Januaria, born in Rio de Janeiro on 2 August 1855, who married at Paris on 12.12.1883 Bozon Doublet Marquess of Persan and Bandeville, and died in Versailles (France) on 27 April 1928. Their son Antônio José Gonçalves de Magalhães de Araguaia was proclaimed Count of Araguaia by the Holy See. Antonio José Maria, known in France as Amédée Joseph Marie, was part of the Brazilian diplomatic delegation in Paris. He was born on 21 January 1859 and died in Paris on 29 October 1917.

He married Marie Eugénie Cornelio Dos Santos, daughter of Jean and Cecilia Souza Breves. She was born in Petropolis on 27 November 1870 and died in Paris on 2 October 1936. They had 4 children. Marie known as Olga was born in Paris on 3 October 1889, and died in Paris on 26 August 1960. She married Georges de Marande. Edmond Amédée was born in Paris on 29 November 1890 and died in Paris on 22 February 1892. Armand Marie Joseph died in Ouchy on 14 May 1910 at 15 years old. Odette was born in Paris on 27 February 1902 and died in Rouen 15 July 1990. His only descendants are on the Persan side.

Gonçalves de Magalhães died in Rome, on July 10, 1882.

== Works ==
- Discurso Sobre a História da Literatura no Brasil (1836)
- Suspiros Poéticos e Saudades (1836)
- António José, ou O Poeta e a Inquisição (1838)
- Olgiato (1839)
- A Confederação dos Tamoios (1856)
- Os Mistérios (1857)
- Urânia (1862)
- Cânticos Fúnebres (1864)
- Fatos do Espírito Humano (1865)
- A Alma e o Cérebro (1876)
- Comentários e Pensamentos (1880)

Preceded by New creation	Baron of Araguaia; 1872 — 1874	Succeeded by None (title abolished)
Preceded by New creation	Viscount of Araguaia; 1874 — 1882	Succeeded by None

Preceded by New creation	Brazilian Academy of Letters - Patron of the 9th chair	Succeeded by Carlos Magalhães de Azeredo (founder)
