= Premio Jabuti – Literary Novel category =

This is a list of all winners of the Prêmio Jabuti in the Literary Novel category since 1959.

== Winners ==
Year	Winner		Title	Publisher	Nominees	Notes
1959	Jorge Amado		Gabriela, Cravo e Canela			
1960	Marques Rebelo		O Trapicheiro			
1961	Maria de Lourdes Teixeira		Rua Augusta			
1962	Osório Alves de Castro		Porto Calendário			
1963	Marques Rebelo		A Mudança			
1964	Francisco Marins		Grotão do Café Amarelo			
1965	José Candido de Carvalho		O Coronel e o Lobisomem			
1966	Érico Veríssimo		O Senhor Embaixador			
1967	José Mauro de Vasconcelos		Confissões do Frei Abóbora			
1968	Bernardo Elis		O Tronco			
1969	Ibiapaba Martins		Noites do Relâmpago			
1970	Maria de Lourdes Teixeira		Pátio das Donzelas			
1971	Lenita Miranda de Figueiredo		O Sexo Começa às Sete			
1972	Luis Martins		A Girafa de Vidro			
1973	Rubens Teixeira Scavone		Clube de Campo			
1974	Lygia Fagundes Teles		As Meninas			
1975	Adonias Filho		As Velhas			
1976	Ivan Ângelo		A Festa			
1977	Herberto Sales		O Fruto do Vosso Ventre			
1978	Clarice Lispector		A Hora da Estrela			
1979	Mário Donato		Partidas Dobradas			
1980	Fernando Sabino		O Grande Mentecapto			
1981	Dyonélio Machado		Endiabrados	Ática		
1982	Sylviano Santiago		Em Liberdade			
1983	José J. Veiga		Aquele Mundo de Vasabarros			
1984	Rubem Fonseca		A Grande Arte			
1985	João Ubaldo Ribeiro		Viva o Povo Brasileiro			
1986	Rubem Mauro Machado		A Idade da Paixão			
1987	Maria Adelaide Amaral		Luisa			
1988	Emil Farhat		Dinheiro na Estrada			
1989	Maria Alice Barroso		A Saga do Cavalo Indomado			
1989	Renato Modernell		Sonata da Última Cidade			
1990	Milton Hatoum		Relato de um Certo Oriente			
1991	Zulmira Ribeiro Tavares		Joias de Família			
1992	Chico Buarque de Hollanda		Estorvo			
1993	Rachel de Queiroz		Memorial de Maria Moura			
1993	João Silvério Trevisan		O Livro do Avesso			
1993	José J. Veiga		O Risonho Cavalo do Príncipe			
1993	Moacyr Scliar		Sonhos Tropicais			
1993	Silviano Santiago		Uma História de Família			
1994	Isaías Pessotti		Aqueles Cães Malditos de Arquelau	Editora 34		
1994	João Gilberto Noll		Harmada	Companhia das Letras		
1994	Otto Lara Resende		O Braço Direito	Companhia das Letras		
1995	1º	Jorge Amado	A Descoberta da América pelos Turcos	Record		
1995	2º	João Silvério Trevisan	Ana em Veneza	Editora Best Seller		
1995	3º	José Roberto Torero	Galantes Memórias e Admiráveis Aventuras do Virtuoso Conselheiro Gomes, o Chalaça	Companhia das Letras		
1996	1º	Ivan Ângelo	Amor?	Companhia das Letras		
1996	2º	Rodrigo Lacerda	O Mistério do Leão Rampante	Ateliê Editorial		
1996	3º	Carlos Heitor Cony	Quase Memória	Companhia das Letras		
1997	João Gilberto Noll		A Céu Aberto	Companhia das Letras		
1997	Fausto Wolff		À Mão Esquerda	Civilização Brasileira		
1997	Flávio Moreira da Costa		O Equilibrista do Arame Farpado	Record		
1997	Luiz Alfredo Garcia-Roza		O Silêncio da Chuva	Companhia das Letras		
1998	1º	Carlos Heitor Cony	A Casa do Poeta Trágico	Companhia das Letras		
1998	2º	Márcio Souza	Lealdade	Marco Zero		
1998	3º	Sérgio Sant'Anna	Um Crime Delicado	Companhia das Letras		
1999	1º	Carlos Nascimento Silva	Cabra-Cega	Relume Dumará		
1999	2º	Sônia Coutinho	Os Seios de Pandora	Rocco		
1999	3º	Modesto Carone	Resumo de Ana	Companhia das Letras		
2000	Moacyr Scliar		A Mulher que escreveu a Bíblia	Companhia das Letras		
2000	Flávio Aguiar		Anita	Boitempo Editorial		
2000	Carlos Heitor Cony		Romance sem Palavras	Companhia das Letras		
2001	Milton Hatoum		Dois Irmãos	Companhia das Letras		
2001	Patrícia Melo		Inferno	Companhia das Letras		
2001	Domingos Pellegrini		O Caso da Chácara Chão	Record		
2002	1º	Rubens Figueiredo	Barco a Seco	Companhia das Letras		
2002	Dionisio Jacob		A Utopia Burocrática de Máximo Modesto	Companhia das Letras		
2002	Luís Giffoni		Adágio para o Silêncio	Pulsar		
2003	1º	Ana Miranda	Dias e Dias	Companhia das Letras		
2003	Domingos Pellegrini		No Coração das Perobas	Record		
2003	Bernardo Carvalho		Nove Noites	Companhia das Letras		
2004	1º	Bernardo Carvalho	Mongólia	Companhia das Letras		
2004	2º	Luiz Antônio de Assis Brasil	A Margem Imóvel do Rio	L&PM Editores		
2004	3º	Chico Buarque de Hollanda	Budapeste	Companhia das Letras		
2005	1º	Nélida Piñon	Vozes do Deserto	Record		
2005	2º	João Gilberto Noll	Lorde	Francis		
2005	3º	Cristóvão Tezza	O Fotógrafo	Rocco		
2006	1º	Milton Hatoum	Cinzas do Norte	Companhia das Letras		
2006	2º	Godofredo de Oliveira Neto	Menino Oculto	Record		
2006	2º	Domingos Pellegrini	Meninos no Poder	Record		
2006	3º	Edgard Telles Ribeiro	Olho de Rei	Record		
2007	1º	Carlos Nascimento Silva	Desengano	Agir		
2007	2º	Luiz Ruffato	Vista Parcial da Noite	Record		
2007	3º	Antônio Torres	Pelo Fundo da Agulha	Record		
2008	1º	Cristovão Tezza	O Filho Eterno	Record		
2008	2º	Bernardo Teixeira de Carvalho	O Sol se Põe em São Paulo	Companhia das Letras		
2008	3º	Beatriz Bracher	Antonio	Editora 34		
2009	1º	Moacyr Scliar	Manual da Paixão Solitária	Companhia das Letras		
2009	2º	Milton Hatoum	Órfãos do Eldorado	Companhia das Letras		
2009	3º	Daniel Galera	Cordilheira	Companhia das Letras		
2010	1º	Edney Silvestre	Se Eu Fechar Os Olhos Agora	Record		
2010	2º	Chico Buarque	Leite Derramado	Companhia das Letras		
2010	3º	Luis Fernando Veríssimo	Os Espiões	Objetiva		
2011	1º	José Castello	Ribamar	Bertrand Brasil		
2011	2º	Rubens Figueiredo	Passageiro do Fim do Dia	Companhia das Letras		
2011	3º	José Roberto Torero e Marcus Aurelius Pimenta	O Evangelho de Barrabás	Editora Objetiva		
2012	1º	Oscar Nakasato	Nihonjin	FGV Direito		
2012	2º	Edival Lourenço	Naqueles morros, depois da chuva	Editora Hedra		
2012	3º	Chico Lopes	O estranho no corredor	Editora 34		
2013	1º	Evandro Affonso Ferreira	O Mendigo que Sabia de Cor os Adágios de Erasmo de Rotterdam	Editora Record		
2013	2º	Victor Heringer	Glória	Editora 7Letras		
2013	3º	Daniel Galera	Barba ensopada de sangue	Companhia das Letras		
2014	1º	Bernardo Carvalho	Reprodução	Companhia das Letras		
2014	2º	Michel Laub	A Maçã Envenenada	Companhia das Letras		
2014	3º	Veronica Stigger	Opisanie Świata	Cosac Naify		
2015	1º	Maria Valéria Rezende	Quarenta Dias	Editora Objetiva		
2015	2º	João Anzanello Carrascoza	Caderno de um Ausente	Cosac Naify		
2015	3º	Evandro Affonso Ferreira	Os Piores Dias de Minha Vida Foram Todos	Editora Record		
2016	1º	Julián Fuks	A Resistência	Companhia das Letras		
2016	2º	Luis S. Krausz	Bazar Paraná	Benvirá		
2016	3º	Sheyla Smanioto	Desesterro	Record		
2017	1º	Silviano Santiago	Machado	Companhia das Letras	Bernardo Carvalho (Simpatia pelo demônio / editora Companhia das Letras); Elvira Vigna (Como se estivéssemos em palimpsesto de putas / editora Companhia das Letras); Eugen Weiss (Tristorosa / editora @linkeditora); J.P. Cuenca(Descobri que estava morto / editora Tusquets); Javier Arancibia Contreras (Soy loco por ti America / editora Companhia das Letras); José Luiz Passos (O Marechal de costas / editora Companhia das Letras); Michel Laub (O tribunal da quinta-feira / editora Companhia das Letras)	
2017	2º	Cristovão Tezza	A Tradutora	Record		
2017	3º	Maria Valéria Rezende	Outros Cantos	Companhia das Letras		
2018	Carol Bensimon		O clube dos jardineiros de fumaça	Companhia das Letras	Acre (Lucrecia Zappi / editora Todavia); Adeus, cavalo (Nuno Ramos / editora Iluminuras); Machamba (Gisele Mirabai / editora Nova Fronteira); Nigredo: estudos de morte e dulia (Joaquim Brasil Fontes / editora Cultura e Barbárie); Noite dentro da noite (Joca Reiners Terron / editora Companhia das Letras); Oito do sete (Cristina Judar / editora Reformatório); Pai, Pai (João Silvério Trevisan / editora Companhia das Letras); Roupas sujas (Leonardo Brasiliense / editora Companhia das Letras); Última Hora (José Almeida Júnior / editora Record)	
2019	Tiago Ferro		O pai da menina morta	Todavia	A biblioteca elementar (Alberto Mussa / editora Record); A tirania do amor (Cristovão Tezza / editora Todavia); Cloro (Alexandre Vidal Porto / editora Companhia das Letras); Enterre seus mortos (Ana Paula Maia / editora Companhia das Letras); Entre as mãos (Juliana Leite / editora Record); Eufrates (André de Leones / editora José Olympio); Manual da demissão (Julia Wähmann / editora Record); Mauricéa (Adrienne Myrtes / Editora Selo Demônio Negro); Nunca houve um castelo (Martha Batalha / editora Companhia das Letras)	
2020	Itamar Vieira Junior		Torto arado	Todavia	Carta à rainha louca (Maria Valéria Rezende/Editora(s): Alfaguara); Essa gente (Chico Buarque / Editora Companhia das Letras); Marrom e Amarelo (Paulo Scott /Editora Alfaguara); O melindre nos dentes da besta (Carol Rodrigues / Editora 7Letras); O quarto branco (Gabriela Aguerre/ Todavia); O último dia da inocência (Edney Silvestre / Record); O verão tardio (Luiz Ruffato / Companhia das Letras); Se deus me chamar não vou (Mariana Salomão Carrara / Nós); Todos os santos (Adriana Lisboa /Alfaguara)	
2021	Jeferson Tenório		O avesso da pele	Companhia das Letras	Semi-finalists: As sobras de ontem (Marcelo Vicintin/Editora Companhia das Letras); Maboque (Tina Vieira/Editora: Quelônio); Maria altamira (Maria José Silveira/ Editora Instante); O que ela sussurra (Noemi Jaffe/Editora Companhia das Letras); Suíte Tóquio (Giovana Madalosso/ Editora Todavia); Finalists: Fé no Inferno (Santiago Nazarian/ Editora(s): Companhia das Letras); Nem sinal de asas (Marcela Dantés / Editora Patuá); Os supridores (José Falero /Editora Todavia); Solução de dois Estados (Michel Laub)/ Editora Companhia das Letras	
2022	Micheliny Verunschk		O som do rugido da onça	Companhia das Letras	Semi-finalists: A palavra que resta (Stênio Gardel / editora Companhia das Letras); É sempre a hora da nossa morte amém (Mariana Salomão Carrara / editora Nós); Uma tristeza infinita (Antônio Xerxenesky / editoria Companhia das Letras); Vozes de batalha (Marina Colasanti / editora Planeta); Vozes de retratos íntimos / Taiasmin Ohnmacht / editora Taverna); Finalists: A extinção das abelhas (Natalia Borges Polesso / editora Companhia das Letras); A pediatra (Andréa Del Fuego / editora Companhia das Letras); Pequena coreografia do adeus (Aline Bei / editora Companhia das Letras); Vista chinesa (Tatiana Salem Levy / editora Todavia)	
2023		Ruy Castro	Os perigos do Imperador	Companhia das Letras	Semi-Finalists: Agora agora (Carlos Eduardo Pereira/editora Todavia); Homem de papel (João Almino/editora Record); O que pesa no Norte (Tiago Germano/Editora Moinhos); Saturno translada (Lucas Lazzaretti/Editora 7Letras); Um crime bárbaro (Ieda Magri/editora Autêntica Contemporânea); Finalists: A vida futura (Sérgio Rodrigues/editora Companhia das Letras); Beatriz e o poeta (Cristóvão Tezza/editora Todavia); Menos que um (Patrícia Melo/editora Casa dos Mundos); Via Ápia(Geovani Martins/editora Companhia das Letras)	
2024	Itamar Vieira Junior		Salvar o fogo	Todavia	Semi-Finalists: Chuva de papel (Martha Batalha/Companhia das Letras); Como se fosse um monstro (Fabiane Guimarães/ Alfaguara); Contra alheias terras (Carlos Mendes Valença/Mondrongo); Oração para desaparecer(Socorro Acioli/Companhia das Letras); Finalists: Jogo de armar (Edgard Telles Ribeiro/Todavia); Mata doce (Luciany Aparecida/Alfaguara); Meu irmão, eu mesmo (João Silvério Trevisan /Alfaguara); Nunca vou te perdoar por ter me obrigado a te esquecer (Jacques Fux/Faria e Silva)	

|}
