= Oceanos-Prêmio de Literatura em Língua Portuguesa =

Brazilian literary award

Oceanos-Prêmio de Literatura em Língua Portuguesa (until 2014 Portugal Telecom Prize for Literature Portuguese: Prêmio Portugal Telecom de Literatura) is a Brazilian literary award established in 2003 by Portugal Telecom and awarded annually to Brazilian literature. From 2007 onwards, Portuguese-language works from other countries are also eligible.

In 2014 Portugal Telecom was bought by the French company Altice. From 2015 on, the prize was named Oceanos- Prêmio de Literatura em Língua Portuguesa (Oceans- Portuguese Language Literature Prize) sponsored by Itaú Cultural foundation.

== Winners ==
Year	Author	Country	Title	English Translation	
2003	1st Bernardo Carvalho; 1st Dalton Trevisan; 2nd Sebastião Uchoa Leite; 3rd Mário Chamie	Brazil; Brazil; Brazil; Brazil	Nove Noites; Pico na veia A regra secreta Horizonte de esgrimas	Nine Nights n/a n/a n/a	
2004	1st Paulo Henriques Britto; 2nd Sérgio Sant'Anna; 3rd Luiz Antonio de Assis Brasil	Brazil; Brazil; Brazil	Macau; O vôo da madrugada A margem imóvel do rio	n/a n/a n/a	
2005	1st Amílcar Bettega Barbosa; 2nd Silviano Santiago; 3rd Edgard Telles Ribeiro	Brazil; Brazil; Brazil	Os lados do círculo O falso mentiroso Histórias mirabolantes de amores clandestinos	n/a n/a n/a	
2006	1st Milton Hatoum; 2nd Alberto Martins; 3rd Ricardo Lísias	Brazil; Brazil; Brazil	Cinzas do Norte; História dos ossos Duas praças	Ashes of the Amazon n/a n/a	
2007	1st Gonçalo M. Tavares; 2nd Dalton Trevisan; 3rd Teixeira Coelho	Angola/Portugal; Brazil; Brazil	Jerusalém; Macho não ganha flor História natural da ditadura	Jerusalem n/a n/a	
2008	1st Cristóvão Tezza; 2nd António Lobo Antunes; 2nd Beatriz Bracher; 3rd Bernardo Carvalho	Brazil; Portugal; Brazil; Brazil	O filho eterno Eu hei-de amar uma pedra António; O Sol Se Põe Em São Paulo	The Eternal Son n/a n/a n/a	
2009	1st Nuno Ramos; 2nd João Gilberto Noll; 3rd Lourenço Mutarelli	Brazil; Brazil; Brazil	Ó Acenos e afagos A arte de produzir efeito sem causa	n/a n/a n/a	
2010	1st Chico Buarque; 2nd Rodrigo Lacerda; 3rd Armando Freitas Filho	Brazil; Brazil; Brazil	Leite Derramado; Outra Vida; Lar	Spilt Milk n/a n/a	
2011	1st Rubens Figueiredo; 2nd Gonçalo M. Tavares; 3rd Marina Colasanti	Brazil; Angola/Portugal; Brazil	Passageiro do Fim do Dia; Uma Viagem à Índia; Minha Guerra Alheia	n/a n/a n/a	
2012	1st Valter hugo mãe 2nd Dalton Trevisan; 3rd Nuno Ramos	Portugal; Brazil; Brazil	A Máquina de Fazer Espanhóis; O Anão e a Ninfeta; Junco	n/a n/a n/a	
2013	1st José Luiz Passos; 2nd Eucanaã Ferraz; 3rd Cíntia Moscovich	Brazil; Brazil; Brazil	O sonâmbulo amador Sentimental; Essa coisa brilhante que é a chuva	n/a n/a n/a	
2014	1st Sérgio Rodrigues; 2nd Everardo Norões; 3rd Gastão Cruz	Brazil; Brazil; Portugal	O drible Entre moscas Observação de verão seguido de fogo	n/a n/a n/a	
2015	1st Silviano Santiago; 2nd Elvira Vigna; 3rd Alberto Mussa & Glauco Mattoso	Brazil; Brazil; Brazil	Mil rosas roubadas Por escrito A primeira história do mundo e Saccola de feira	n/a n/a n/a	
2016	1st José Luís Peixoto; 2nd Julián Fuks; 3rd Ana Martins Marques; 4th Arthur Dapieve	Portugal; Brazil; Brazil; Brazil	Galveias; A Resistência; O livro das semelhanças Maracanazo e outras histórias	n/a n/a n/a	
2017	1st Ana Teresa Pereira; 2nd Silviano Santiago; 3rd Helder Moura Pereira	Portugal; Brazil; Portugal	Karen; Machado; Golpe de Teatro	n/a n/a n/a	
2018	1st Marília Garcia; 2nd Bruno Vieira Amaral; 3rd Luís Quintais; 4th Luís Carlos Patraquim	Brazil; Portugal; Portugal; Mozambique	Câmera lenta Hoje estarás comigo no paraíso A noite imóvel O deus restante	n/a n/a n/a n/a	
2019	1st Djaimilia Pereira de Almeida; 2nd Dulce Maria Cardoso; 3rd Nara Vidal	Portugal; Portugal; Brazil	Luanda, Lisboa, Paraíso; Eliete – A vida normal Sorte	n/a n/a n/a	
2020	1st Itamar Vieira Junior; 2nd Djaimilia Pereira de Almeida; 3rd Maria Valéria Rezende	Brazil; Portugal; Brazil	Torto arado A visão das plantas Carta à rainha louca	Crooked Plow n/a n/a	
2021	1st Luís Cardoso; 2nd Edmilson de Almeida Ferreira; 3rd Gonçalo M. Tavares	Timor-Leste; Brazil; Angola/Portugal	O Plantador de Abóboras; O Ausente; O osso do meio	The Pumpkin Planter n/a n/a	
2022	1st Alexandra Lucas Coelho; 2nd João Paulo Borges Coelho; 3rd Micheliny Verunschk	Portugal; Mozambique; Brazil	Líbano, labirinto Museu da Revolução; O som do rugido da onça	n/a n/a The Jaguar's Roar	
2023	Prose - Joaquim Arena Poetry - Prisca Agustoni	Cape VerdeBrazil	Siríaco e Mister Charles O gosto amargo dos metais	Prose Poetry	n/a n/a
2024	Prose - Micheliny Verunschk Poetry - Nuno Júdice	Brazil Portugal	Caminhando com os mortos Uma colheita de silêncios	Prose Poetry	n/a n/a
2025	Prose - Silvana Tavano Poetry - Ana Maria Vasconcelos	Brazil Brazil	Ressucitar mamutes Longarinas	Prosa Poesia	n/a n/a
