= Cosac =

Cosac is a surname. Notable people with the surname include:

- Charles Cosac (born 1964), Brazilian publisher
- George Cosac (born 1968), Romanian tennis player
