= Bernardo Carvalho =

Brazilian author and journalist (born 1960)

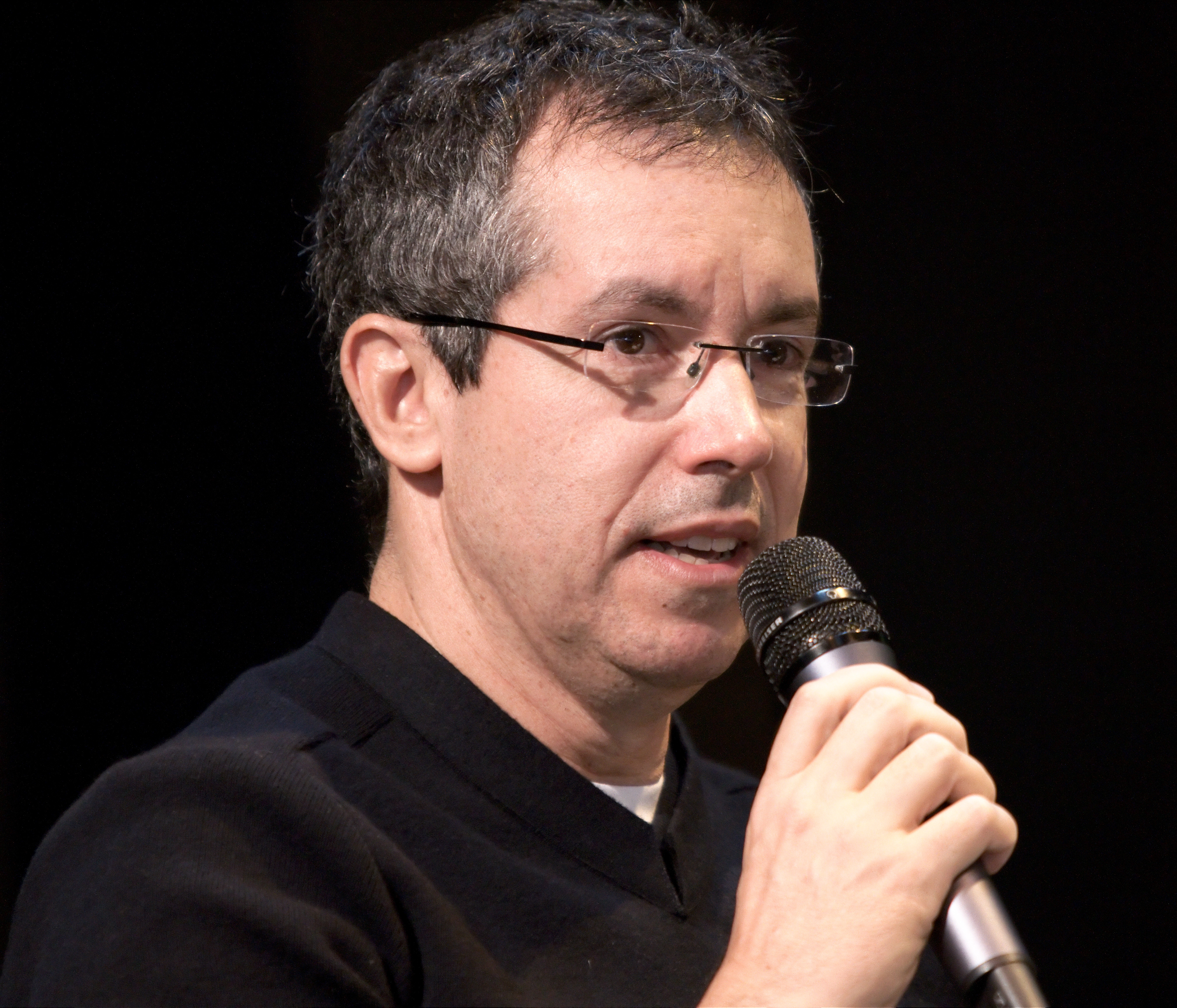
- Carvalho in March 2010
- Born: 1960 (age 65–66) Rio de Janeiro, Brazil
- Occupation: Author; journalist
- Notable awards: Portugal Telecom Prize for Literature (2003)

Bernardo Teixeira de Carvalho (born 1960 in Rio de Janeiro) is a Brazilian author and journalist.

== Career ==
He graduated in journalism at the Pontifical Catholic University of Rio de Janeiro in 1983. In 1986 he began writing for Folha de S.Paulo, where he was the editor of the essay section “Folhetim", and was a Paris and New York correspondent for the newspaper.

In 1993 he got a master's degree in cinema at the University of São Paulo's School of Communications and Arts. Between 1998 and 2008 he was a columnist for Folha's culture section Ilustrada. He debuted in literature with the short story collection Aberração. His first two novels were edited in France.

His novel Mongólia received the 2003 prize of the Associação Paulista dos Críticos de Arte. He shared the Portugal Telecom Prize for Literature with Dalton Trevisan for his novel Nove Noites.

== Awards and recognitions ==
- 2003 Associação Paulista dos Críticos de Arte prize of Best Novel for Mongólia
  - Portugal Telecom Prize for Literature for Nove Noites
- 2004 Jabuti Prize -Literary Novel — 1st place for Mongólia.
- 2008 São Paulo Prize for Literature — Shortlisted in the Best Book of the Year category for O Sol se Põe em São Paulo
- 2010 São Paulo Prize for Literature — Shortlisted in the Best Book of the Year category for O Filho da Mãe
- 2014 São Paulo Prize for Literature — Shortlisted in the Best Book of the Year category for Reprodução
- 2014 Jabuti Prize -Literary Novel — 1st place for Reprodução.

== Bibliography ==
- Aberração (short story collection) 1993
- Onze (novel) 1995
- Os Bêbados e os Sonâmbulos (novel) 1996
- Teatro (novel) 1998
- As Iniciais (novel) 1999
- Medo de Sade (novel) 2000
- Nove Noites (novel) 2002 - published in English in 2007 as Nine Nights (translated by Benjamin Moser)
- Mongólia (novel) 2003
- O Sol se Põe em São Paulo (novel) 2007
- O Filho da Mãe (novel) 2009
- Reprodução (novel) 2013
- Simpatia pelo demônio (novel) 2016
- O último gozo do mundo (novel) 2021
- Os substitutos (novel) 2023
