= Ely Building =

Brazilian historic building

Coordinates: 30°01′34″S 51°13′11″W

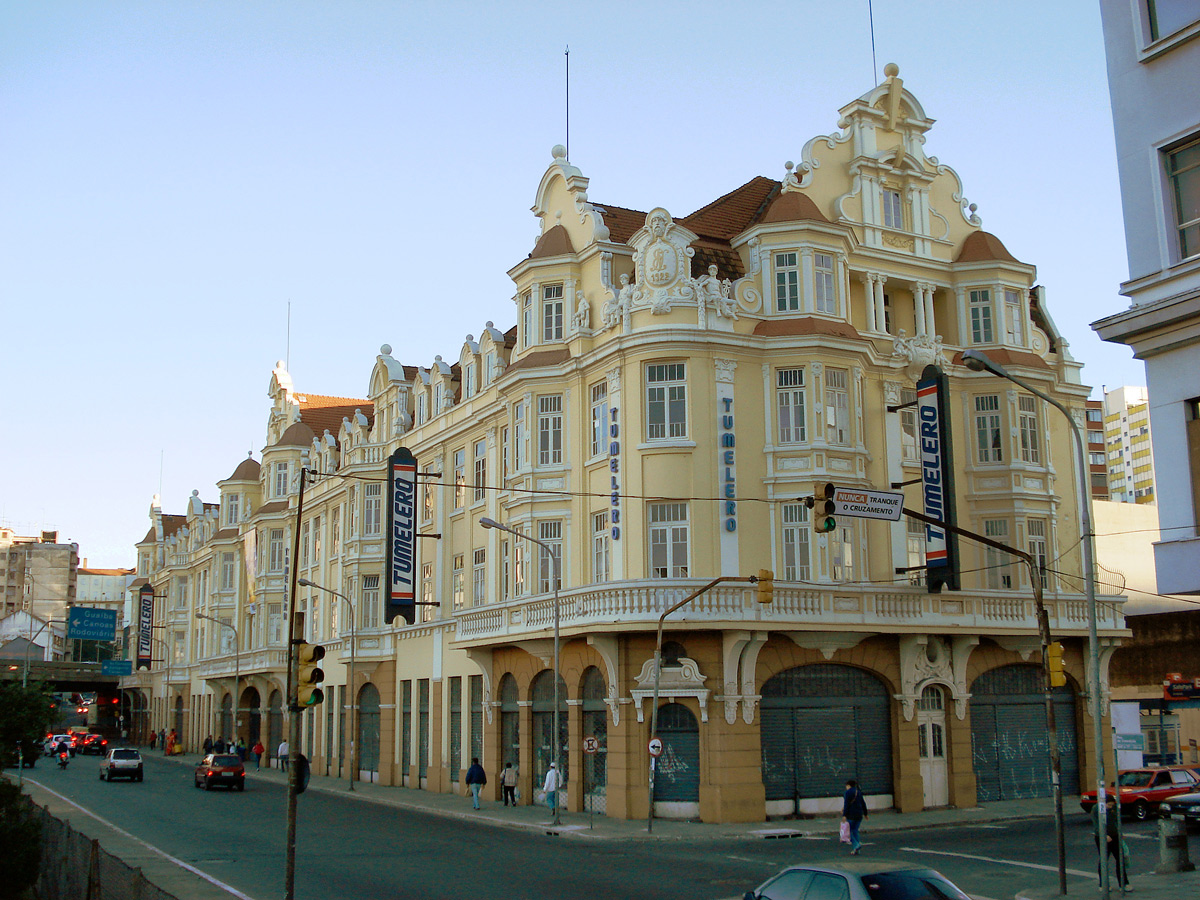
Ely Building.

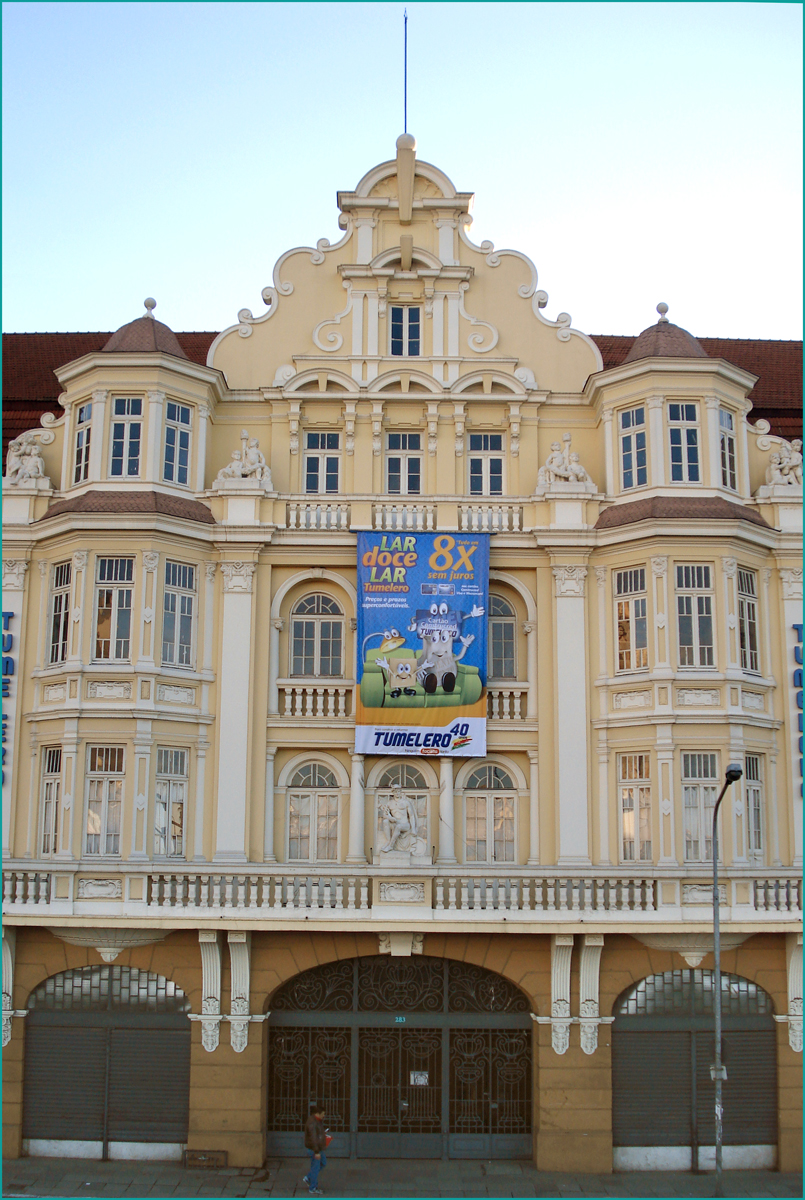
Detail of central part of facade.

The Ely Building is a historic construction located in the Brazilian city of Porto Alegre, capital of Rio Grande do Sul, considered a cultural heritage of the city.

The building, located at 283 Conceição Street, next to the bus station, was designed and erected between 1922 and 1923 by the German-Brazilian architect Theodor Wiederspahn, to be a store of the merchant Nicolau Ely, who became rich in the fabric trade. Originally, Ely kept his business on the first floor and rented out the upper floors for offices.

Built in masonry in an eclectic style of Germanic inspiration, with Renaissance and Baroque elements, the building has about 8,000 square metres (86,000 sq ft), spread over four floors, and 3,220 m^{2} (34,700 sq ft) of facade, decorated with tall and narrow windows with delicate frames, balustrades, domes, ornaments, statuary and wrought iron railings, highlighting a pediment with volutes and a statue of Mercury over the entrance, created by Alfredo Staege.

It currently houses the downtown branch of Tumelero, a chain of construction materials stores. Despite being quite well preserved, the building has suffered aggressive interventions in its surroundings in recent years, such as the construction of a viaduct at a short distance, which hides part of the facade. Over the years it has undergone several repairs, and in 2012 a revitalization was carried out. Sergius Gonzaga, municipal secretary for culture, explained the initiative by saying that "this is a contribution to the soul of the city". Luiz Antonio de Assis Brasil, state secretary for culture, said that "the work has an aesthetic value for the collective memory of Porto Alegre". For historian and architect Arnoldo Doberstein, the building is particularly important for the history of architecture in Porto Alegre. According to Poltosi & Roman, from the Memory Center of the Council of Architecture and Urbanism of Rio Grande do Sul, its variety of elements lends dynamism to its extensive facade and its aesthetic qualities place it as "one of the most outstanding examples of eclectic architecture in Porto Alegre".

== See also ==
- History of Porto Alegre
- Architecture of Porto Alegre
