= Isaías Pessotti =

Brazilian psychologist and writer (1933–2024)

Isaías Pessotti (1933–2024) was a Brazilian psychologist, writer, and professor. He was born in São Bernardo do Campo and trained at the University of São Paulo. A prolific researcher, he wrote several books on madness in the 1990s, such as A louca e as épocas, O século dos manicômios, and Os nomes da louca. He taught at the University of São Paulo and at the Federal University of São Carlos. Also in 1993, he published the novel Aqueles cães malditos de Arquelau. The book won the Prêmio Jabuti for Best Novel in 1994.

He died in Ribeirão Preto in March 2024.
