= Ênio Silveira =

Brazilian book editor

Ênio Silveira, Leandro Konder, Álvares da Silva, and Lima Campos

Ênio Silveira (November 18, 1925 – January 11, 1996) was a Brazilian journalist, translator, and book editor. He is best known for pioneering innovations in the Brazilian publishing market as well as for his active opposition to the Brazilian military dictatorship.

== Biography ==
Born in São Paulo to a middle-class family, Silveira was still a student at the University of São Paulo when he was invited by Monteiro Lobato to work at Companhia Editora Nacional, at the time one of the largest publishing houses in Brazil. In 1946, Silveira moved to New York City, where he trained as a book editor at Columbia University and worked as an intern at Alfred A. Knopf.

Settled in Rio de Janeiro, he began directing the publishing house Civilização Brasileira, which saw rapid expansion with the introduction of editorial innovations, such as the use of paperbacks, the mass engraving of drawings in books, and modern cover designs, as well as new marketing strategies, such as outdoor advertising. Over time, it became the largest house in Brazil, publishing both native and foreign authors, including Ernest Hemingway, Bertolt Brecht, Karl Marx, Hermann Hesse, Vladimir Nabokov, Carlos Heitor Cony, Caio Prado Júnior, Ferreira Gullar, Sérgio Buarque de Holanda, and Antonio Callado.

Following the 1964 military coup, Silveira, a member of the Brazilian Communist Party, was arrested several times, had many of his books confiscated and burned, and saw his bookshop targeted by bomb attacks and a possible arson. Nonetheless, Civilização Brasileira continued to thrive through the 1960s and 1970s, until it was acquired by Editora Record after a period of steady financial decline.

Silveira died in 1996, at age 70.
