= Alexandre Vidal Porto =

Brazilian writer and diplomat

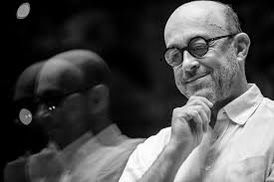
- Alexandre Vidal Porto (2023). Photo by Ana Castro
- Born: São Paulo, São Paulo, Brazil
- Occupations: Writer, Diplomat
- Writing career
- Notable works: Matias na Cidade (2005), Sergio Y. vai à América (2014), Cloro (2018), Sodomita (2023)
- Website: alexandrevidalporto.com

Alexandre Vidal Porto (born March 19, São Paulo) is a Brazilian writer and diplomat.

== Biography ==
Born in São Paulo, he holds degrees from the University of Fortaleza, Harvard Law School and Instituto Rio Branco, the Brazilian Diplomatic Academy. He joined the Brazilian foreign service as a diplomat in 1991 and, in addition to São Paulo, lived in Fortaleza, Brasília, New York, Santiago, Boston, Mexico City, Washington, Tokyo, and Frankfurt. Currently, he lives and works in Amsterdam.

In 2005, he was admitted to the Order of Rio Branco by President Luiz Inácio Lula da Silva, already at the rank of ordinary Officer. He currently holds the rank of Grand Officer.

Since 2002, he has been married to a U.S. citizen, being one of the few openly homosexual ambassadors in Itamaraty, the Brazilian Ministry of Foreign Affairs.

In 2012, he wrote a blog ("Elemento Estrangeiro") for Bravo! magazine online, and, from 2012 to 2016, had a weekly column in Folha de S.Paulo, the largest Brazilian daily newspaper.

His debut novel, "Matias da Cidade", was released in 2005 by Editora Record and had a new edition in 2023 by Companhia das Letras. In 2014, he published "Sérgio Y. Vai à América", winner of the Paraná Literature Prize and translated into English and Italian. His third novel, "Cloro", shortlisted for the Jabuti Award, was released in 2018. In 2023, he published "Sodomita", winner of the Mix Literary Prize at the 31st edition of the Mix Brasil Festival of Cultural Diversity.

== LGBTQIA+ Activism ==
Author of books addressing sexual and gender diversity, Alexandre Vidal Porto is an LGBTQIA+ activist and correlates his literary career to his own homosexuality. He addresses LGBT+ issues personally and in his writing "to make the path easier for new generations", extending this understanding to the Ministry of Foreign Affairs, where he is part of a project honoring the memory of colleagues from the foreign service who suffered persecution due to gender and sexual orientation.

He advocates for and finds it important to have literature that speaks about the gay universe. In an interview with Correio Braziliense in 2018, he stated, "People dislike being labeled as an LGBT author or having a book called LGBT literature. I don't. On the contrary, I am proud to be an LGBT writer while writing about LGBT. There is a certain discomfort for many authors, not all, and, in great literature, it is a somewhat proscribed theme. But I think LGBT literature is also coming out of the closet".

== Works ==
=== Novels ===
- "Matias na Cidade" (2005)
- "Sergio Y. vai à América" (2012)
- "Cloro" (2018)
- "Sodomita" (2023)

=== Blogs and Columns ===
- Bravo! Magazine, blog Elemento Estrangeiro.
- Folha de S. Paulo, "World" section.

== Awards ==
- Paraná Literature Prize (2014)
- Finalist for the Jabuti Award (2018)
- Mix Literary Prize at the Mix Brasil Festival of Culture and Diversity (2023)
- Best novel in The National Library Literaty Award (2024)
