= João Anzanello Carrascoza =

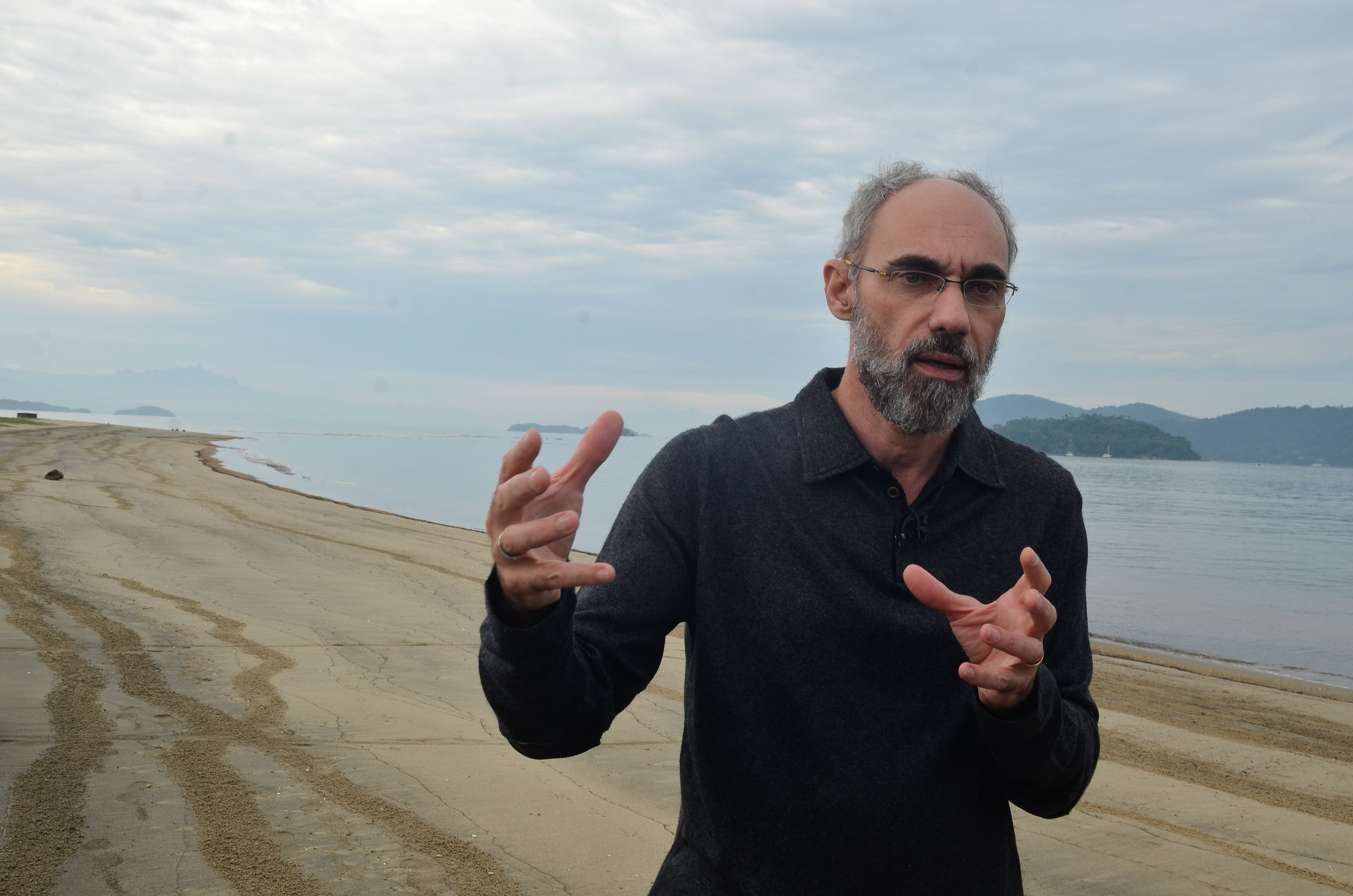
image of João Carrascoza

João Luís Anzanello Carrascoza (born 1962) is a Brazilian writer. He was born in Cravinhos, São Paulo and studied advertising at the University of São Paulo. He eventually proceeded to obtain a PhD from ECA/USP. As a writer, he began publishing in the 1980s. His first book of short stories Hotel Solidão appeared in 1992, and later volumes have cemented his reputation as one of Brazil's finest writers of short fiction. His work has been praised by Carlos Bosi and Raduan Nassar among others, and his stories have been translated into Italian and Spanish.

He was one of the three winners of the 2015 Premio Jabuti for Best Novel; his winning book was called Caderno de um Ausente.
