= Flávio Aguiar =

Brazilian writer (born 1947)

Flávio Wolf de Aguiar is a Brazilian writer and academic. He was born in Porto Alegre in 1947. He studied at the University of São Paulo, where he completed his Master's and Doctorate in Literary Theory and Comparative Literature. He taught at USP for more than 30 years.

Aguiar has written around 20 books. He is a four-time winner of the Premio Jabuti. He won the prize in the Literary Essay category for his 1984 work A comédia nacional no teatro de José de Alencar and he also won in 2000 in the Literary Novel category for Anita.

Aguiar is based in Berlin.
