= Maria Alice Barroso =

Brazilian novelist (1926–2012)

Maria Alice Giudice Barroso Soares (1926–2012) was a Brazilian librarian, novelist and short story writer. Her novel A Name to Kill (1967) won the Walmap Award, and The Untamed Horse Saga (1988) won the 1989 Premio Jabuti. She was also director of the National Book Institute, the National Library of Brazil and the Brazilian National Archives.

== Life ==
Maria Alice Barroso was born in 1926. Some sources give her birthplace as Miracema, while other sources say that she was born in Rio de Janeiro and moved to Miracema when she was very young.

Maria Alice trained as a librarian. Her first novel, The Squatters (1955) won praise from Jorge Amado. It was published in the Soviet Union, selling 200,000 copies. A Name to Kill (1967) won the Walmap Award. It was the first of a cycle of novels, God's Stop Cycle. The second in the series, Who Killed Pacifico? (1969), was adapted as a 1977 film starring Jece Valadão, Joffre Soares and Ruth de Souza. The cycle also included The Untamed Horse Saga (1988), which won her the literary novel category of the Prêmio Jabuti in 1989.

She was director of the National Book Institute, the National Library of Brazil and the Brazilian National Archives.

Maria Alice died on 12 October 2012 in Juiz de Fora, Minas Gerais.

In 2018, in an initiative led by judge Marcus Faver, she was memorialized by a statue in the main square of Miracema.

== Works ==
- Os posseiros [The squatters]. 1955.
- Estamos sós [We are alone]. 1957.
- História de um casamento [Story of a wedding]. 1960.
- Um simples afeto reciproco [A simple reciprocal affection]. 1962.
- Um nome para matar: romance [A name To kill]. 1967.
- Quem matou Pacífico? [Who killed Pacific?]. 1969.
- Um dia vamos rir disso tudo [One day let's laugh about it all]. 1976.
- O globo da morte: divino das flores: romance [The globe of death: divine of flowers: romance]. 1981.
- A saga do cavalo indomado [The untamed horse saga]. 1988.
- A morte do presidente, ou, A amiga de mamãe [The president's death, or, Mama's friend]. 1994.
