= Quatro Cinco Um =

- Editor: Associação Quatro Cinco Um
- Categories: Literary reviews, human rights, scientific communication
- Frequency: Monthly
- Founder: Paulo Werneck; Humberto Werneck
- First issue: May 2017
- Country: Brazil
- Language: Portuguese
- Website: www.quatrocincoum.com.br
- ISSN: 2526-558X

Quatro Cinco Um is an independent Brazilian magazine that focuses on literary criticism. It is published on multiple platforms (press, podcasts, websites, newsletters, and events) by the Associação Quatro Cinco Um, a non-profit organization created for the magazine's publication.

With journalists Paulo Werneck and Humberto Werneck as directors, the magazine covers around 20 different areas of Brazilian editorial production, with an emphasis towards literature, human rights, and the dissemination of scientific research. It is funded through subscribers, sales in newsstands and book stores, announcements on the literary market, private donations, and voluntary projects for books and reading. The magazine was inspired by foreign literary review organizations such as the London Review of Books and The New York Review of Books, publishing reviews of fiction and non fiction releases that serve as the foundation for discussions of societal themes of interest. At the end of very printed edition, the "Listão" brings together nearly 100 notes about releases of the month in different areas.

The title is in reference to the Ray Bradbury novel Fahrenheit 451, where books are prohibited and incinerated at 451 °F (approximately 233 °C) - the temperature at which paper combusts. Quatro Cinco Um is affiliated with Ajor (Associação de Jornalismo Digital) and is a member of the LEQT (Leitura e Escrita de Qualidade para Todos) network.

Djaimilia Pereira de Almeida has been a contributor to the magazine.

== History ==
The magazine was created in 2017 by Paulo Werneck and Fernanda Diamant, and published in print. Quatro Cinco Um had an initial circulation of 35,000 copies, which was freely distributed for 6 months by subscribers of Piauí.

On the occasion of its release, the magazine hosted, in partnership with Sesc São Paulo, the Livros em Revista seminary, with editors of literary review publications from Brazil, Portugal, France, and Argentina in attendance.

In December 2018, Quatro Cinco Um received the IPL Retratos da Leitura Prize, given by the Instituto Pró-Livro, in the Media category.

In March 2019, Diamant left the Associação Quatro Cinco Um, remaining as an editor of the scientific research section of the magazine until December 2020.

In July 2019, the magazine premiered the podcast 451 MHz, with them publishing it bimonthly and with production by Rádio Novelo. The program is hosted by Paulo Werneck and interviews writers, critics, and intellectuals. The podcast was a finalist for the Prêmio Jabuti in 2020 in the Fomento à Leitura category of the Innovation hub. They were selected as one of the best podcasts of 2019 by Spotify.

In October 2019, the magazine published its third edition, the Especial Infantojuvenil, with the best books for kids and adolescents, having actress Fernanda Montenegro on the cover playing as a witch about to burn books in a bonfire. The edition was directed by Luciano Schmitz and with photography by Marian Maltoni, and had major repercussions.

In March 2020, Quatro Cinco Um became part of the LEQT (Leitura e Escrita de Qualidade para Todos) network, which brings together more than 80 Brazilian projects geared towards books and reading.

In October 2020, Quatro Cinco Um produced and released the scientific research podcast Vinte Mil Léguas, recounting the scientific and literary aspects of Charles Darwin in On the Origin of Species. With direction by Diamant and hosted by Sofia Nestrovski and Leda Cartum, the podcast received support from the Instituto Serrapilheira and was realized in partnership with the bookstore Megafauna, which produced and released the second season.
