= Rubem Mauro Machado =

Brazilian writer and translator

Rubem Mauro Machado (born 1941) is a Brazilian writer and translator. He came to prominence with his first collection of short stories Jacares ao Sol (1976) and won further renown with books such as Jantar envenenado (1979) and A idade da paixão (1985). He won the Jabuti Prize for Literary Fiction in 1986 for A idade da paixão.

== Scholarly works ==
- Machado, Rubem Mauro (1976). Jacarés ao sol (in Brazilian Portuguese). Editora Ática.
- Machado, Rubem Mauro (2000). O executante (in Brazilian Portuguese). Editora Record. ISBN 978-85-01-05708-2.
- Machado, Rubem Mauro (1979). Jantar envenenado: contos (in Brazilian Portuguese). Atica.
