= Rubens Teixeira Scavone =

Brazilian writer (1925–2007)

Rubens Teixeira Scavone (1925–2007) was a Brazilian writer, best known for his works of science fiction. He won the Jabuti Prize for best novel in 1973, for his book Clube de Campo. His first book, O Homem que Viu o Disco-voador, was published in 1958, and he wrote other titles such as Degrau para as Estrelas and O Projeto Dragão.

His mother Maria de Lourdes Teixeira (1907–1989) was also a well-known writer, and a two-time winner of the Jabuti Prize for best novel.
