= Djaimilia Pereira de Almeida =

Portuguese novelist and essayist

Djaimilia Pereira de Almeida is a Portuguese novelist and essayist of partial African descent. She was born in Luanda, Angola, in 1982, but grew up near Lisbon. She completed a PhD in literary theory from the University of Lisbon. She is the author of Esse Cabelo [That Hair], Ajudar a cair, Luanda, Lisboa, Paraíso, Pintado com o pé and A visão das plantas. Her writing has appeared in granta.com, Blog da Companhia das Letras, Granta Portugal, Serrote, Zum, Pessoa, Ler, Buala, and elsewhere. She is a contributor for the Brazilian magazine Quatro Cinco Um.

That Hair was released in an English translation by Eric M. B. Becker in 2020.

== Course ==
She graduated in Portuguese Studies at the New University of Lisbon. Her Master's dissertation, Amadores, written in 2006, was awarded the Primeiras Teses Prize 2010, by the Centro de Literatura Portuguesa da Universidade de Coimbra. She received her PhD in 2012 in Theory of Literature from the Programme in Theory of Literature at the University of Lisbon.

This Hair, her first book, published in 2015, combines biographical elements with novel and essay and starts from the experience of a black-skinned, curly-haired girl from Angola in the Portuguese society of the mid-1980s. She started writing it when she left academic life, however, she claims to find a relationship between the book and her doctoral thesis.

She has published work in Ler, Granta, Serrote Magazine, Zum Magazine, Common Knowledge, Pessoa Magazine, Words Without Borders, and has written in the blog of the publisher Companhia das Letras. She writes for Quatro Cinco Um Magazine.

In March 2021, she was appointed consultant to the Civil House of the President of the Republic, Marcelo Rebelo de Sousa.

== Awards ==
Luanda, Lisboa, Paraíso was awarded the Prémio Literário Fundação Inês de Castro, 2018; the Prémio Literário Fundação Eça de Queiroz, 2019; and the Prêmio Oceanos, 2019.

== Books ==
- 2015, Esse Cabelo. Teorema. ISBN 9789724750385.
- 2017, Esse Cabelo. Leya. ISBN 9788544105221.
- 2017, Ajudar a cair. Fundação Francisco Manuel dos Santos. ISBN 9789898838919.
- 2018, Luanda, Lisboa, Paraíso. Companhia das Letras. ISBN 9789896655914.
- 2019, Luanda, Lisboa, Paraíso. Companhia das Letras / Brazil. ISBN 9788535932690.
- 2019, Pintado com o pé. Relógio D’Água Editores. ISBN 9789896419172.
- 2019, A Visão das Plantas. Relógio D'Água Editores. ISBN 9789896419752.
