= André de Leones =

Brazilian novelist

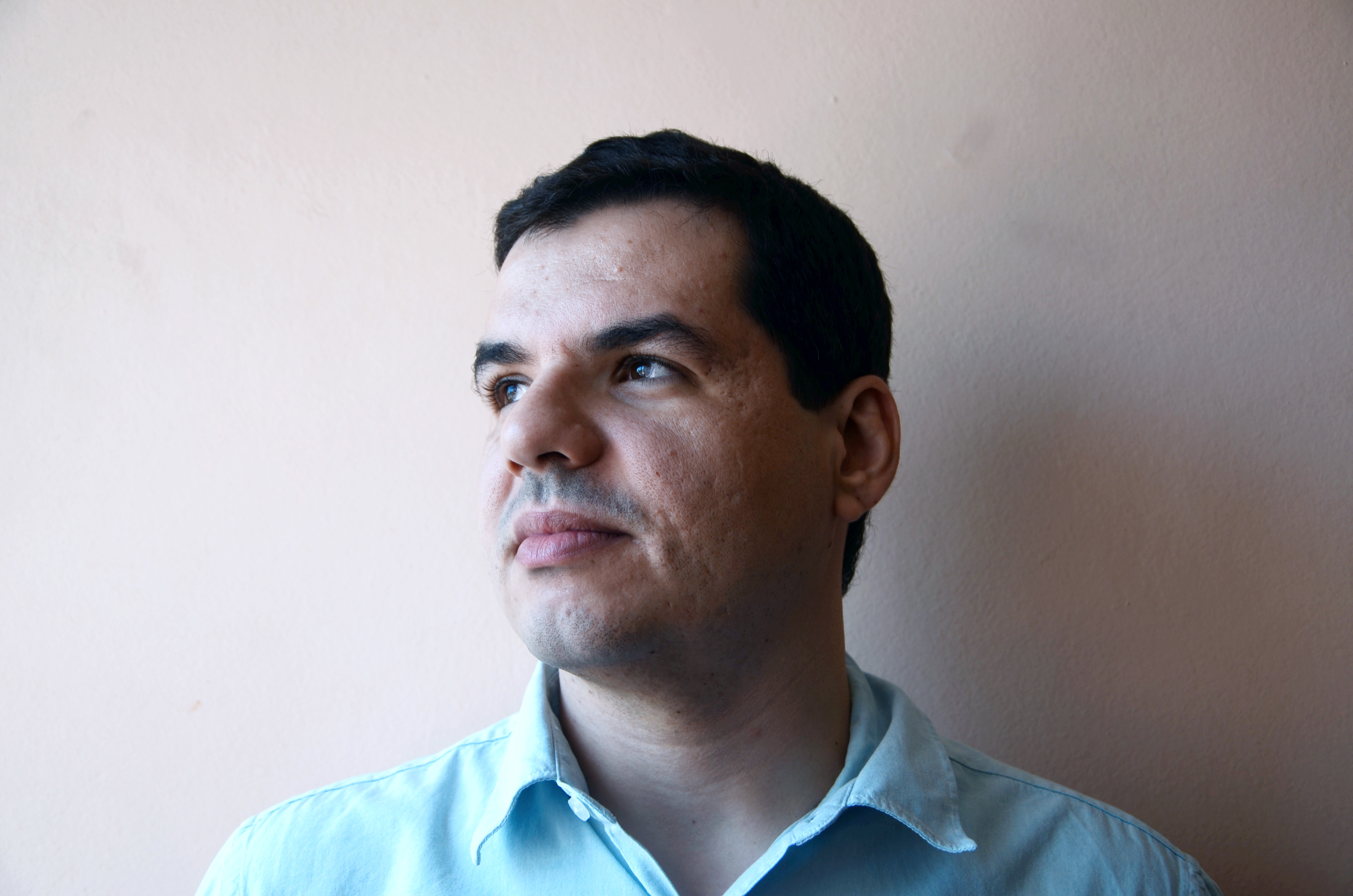
- Born: André de Leones; 1980 (age 45–46); Goiânia, Goiás, Brazil
- Education: Pontifical Catholic University of São Paulo
- Occupation: Novelist
- Writing career
- Period: 2006
- Genre: fiction
- Notable works: Hoje Está um Dia Morto, Terra de Casas Vazias, Abaixo do Paraíso, Vento de Queimada
- Notable awards: Prêmio Sesc for Writing; 2005
- Website: andredeleones.com.br//

André de Leones (born 1980 in Goiânia) is a Brazilian novelist.

He was born in Goiânia and grew up in Silvânia, in the inner state of Goiás, Brazil. His home town frequently appears in his novels.

He was the winner of the 2005 Prêmio Sesc de Literatura for his debut novel Hoje Está um Dia Morto. Leones has released five more novels and a short story collection and has been published in several short story anthologies. He has a Bachelor's degree in Philosophy by the Pontifical Catholic University of São Paulo and has also written about literature for Brazilian newspapers and magazines.

== Works ==
His short story (and a novella) collection Paz na Terra Entre os Monstros followed shortly after his debut. His third novel, Dentes Negros, was released in 2011. The novel is about a fictitious apocalypse and its aftermath. In 2013 he released Terra de Casas Vazias. The novel was granted the Programa Petrobras Cultural sponsorship. His following novel, Abaixo do Paraíso, was considered by the newspaper O Globo one of the best fiction books published in 2016. Eufrates, his next novel, was shortlisted for the 2019 São Paulo Prize for Literature and longlisted for the Oceanos and Jabuti literary prizes. His latest work is Vento de Queimada, a crime novel set in the Brazilian Midwest, in the early 1980s. The main character of the novel is a female professional killer involved with corrupt politicians and other criminals.

Leones lives in São Paulo since 2010.

=== Novels ===
- (2006) Hoje Está um Dia Morto (Today is a Dead Day)
- (2010) Como Desaparecer Completamente (How to Disappear Completely)
- (2011) Dentes Negros (Black Teeth)
- (2013) Terra de Casas Vazias (Land of Empty Houses)
- (2016) Abaixo do Paraíso (Below Heaven)
- (2018) Eufrates
- (2023) Vento de Queimada (Scorched Wind)

=== Short story ===
- (2008) "Paz na Terra Entre os Monstros" (Peace on Earth Amongst Monsters)
