= Maria de Lourdes Teixeira =

Brazilian writer, translator, and biographer

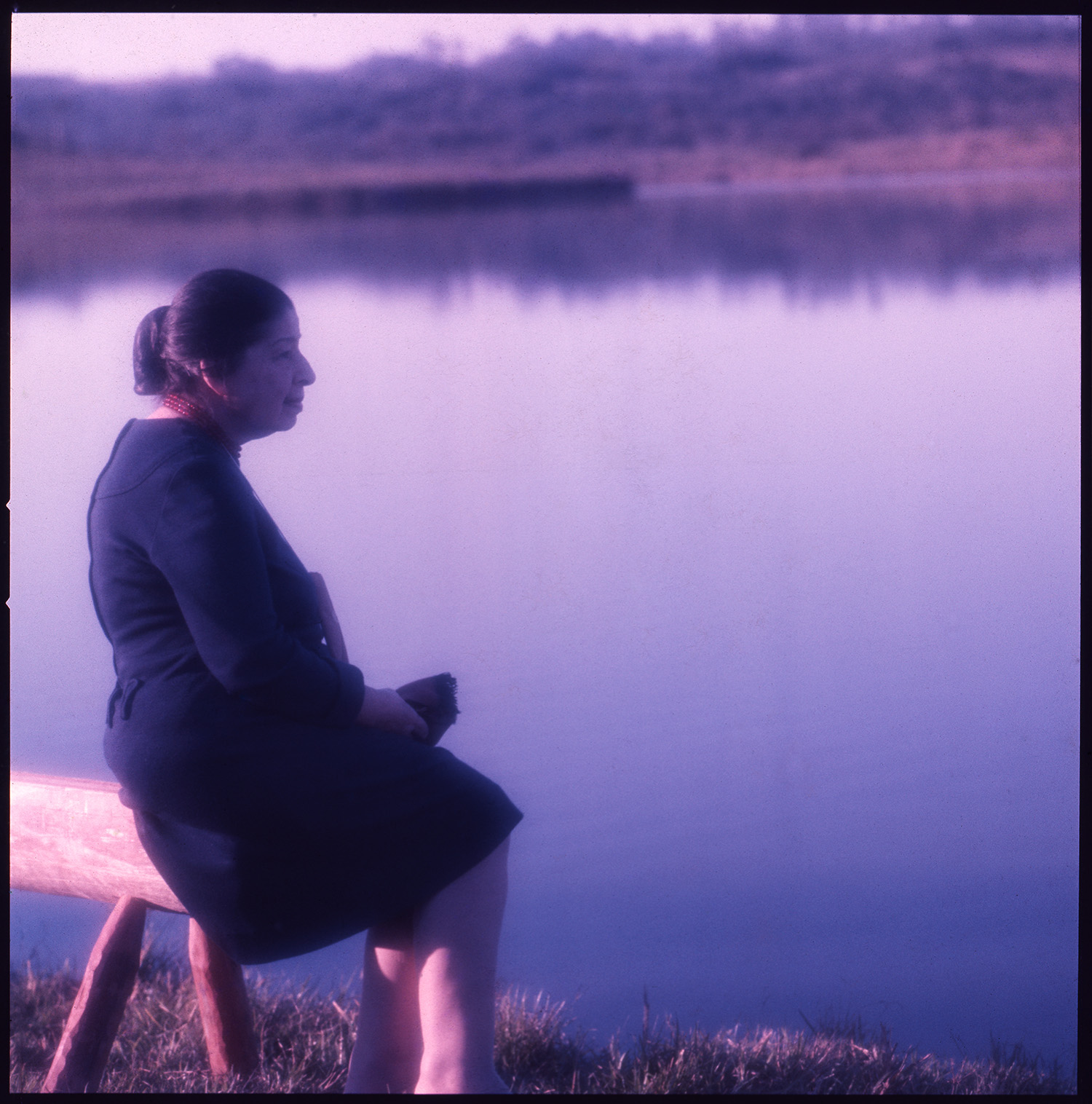
Maria de Lourdes Teixeira in 1987

Maria de Lourdes Teixeira (25 March 1907 – 1989) was a Brazilian writer, translator, biographer and journalist best known for having received the Prêmio Jabuti (Jabuti Prize for Literature) for Best Novel in 1961 and 1970, for Rua Augusta and Pátio das Donzelas respectively. She was also the first woman to be accepted to the Paulista Academy of Letters.

== Biography ==
Born in São Pedro, she made her debut in the literary field in the 1920s when she published two essays in the magazine Papel e Tinta. Around 1952 she contributed to the newspaper O Estado de S. Paulo. In her personal life, Teixeira was first married to Ermelindo Scavone, who forbade her from publishing her writings. She had a second marriage with the academic José Geraldo Vieira (1897-1977), whose son Rubens Teixeira Scavone (1925–2007) also was a member of the Paulista Academy and won the Jabuti Prize for Best Novel in 1973 with Clube de Campo.

== Works ==
=== Novels ===
- Raiz amarga (1960)
- Rua Augusta (1963)
- O pátio das Donzelas (1969)
- O banco de Três Lugares (1975)
- A virgem noturna (1975)

=== Short stories ===
- O criador de centauros (1964)
- Todas as horas de um homem (1983)

=== Other ===
- A carruagem alada (memoirs, 1986)
- O pássaro-tempo (1968)
- A Ilha da Salamandra (1976)
- Graça Aranha (1952)
- Esfinges de papel (essay, 1966)
