= Tiago Ferro =

Brazilian writer and editor

Tiago Ferro is a Brazilian writer. Founder and editor of the Brazilian independent publishing house e-galáxia, he brought out the literary magazine Peixe-elétrico, packed with contributions from writers such as Umberto Eco, Juan Villoro and Fredric Jameson.

Ferro's daughter Manu died in 2016, at the age of eight. This triggered him to write fiction; his 2018 novel O pai da menina morta appeared in 2018, and won the Prêmio Jabuti.

Ferro teaches at the University of Sao Paulo.
