= Cosac Naify =

Brazilian publishing house

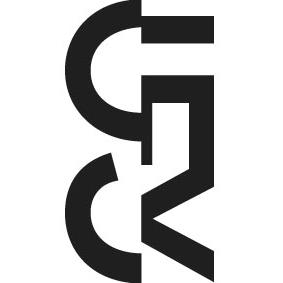
- Industry: Publishing house
- Genre: Art books, fiction, and children's books
- Founded: 1996
- Founder: Charles Cosac
- Defunct: 2015
- Headquarters: São Paulo, Brazil

Cosac Naify ([koˈzak ˈnejfi]) was a Brazilian publishing house which operated from 1996 to 2015. Founded by Charles Cosac and Michael Naify, the publisher became known about their luxury designed art, humanities, novels and children's books; Charles Cosac described the house as a "cult publishing house, whose books are destined to scholars and art students".

Cosac Naify debuted with the book Barroco de lírios, by the artist Tunga. The house published books by novelists such as Alejandro Zambra, valter hugo mãe, Enrique Vila-Matas, Karen Blixen, Herman Melville, Leo Tolstoy, and Victor Hugo. Among the children's books were works by Shel Silverstein, Maurice Sendak, Edward Gorey and the Captain Underpants series.

The publisher closed its activities at the end of 2015; Cosac said the high costs of book production and his unwillingness to compromise its editorial line led him to that decision. Companhia das Letras has acquired some of Cosac Naify's catalogue, including the works of Dav Pilkey, Leo Tolstoy, and Shel Silverstein.
