= Cristóvão Tezza =

Brazilian novelist and university professor

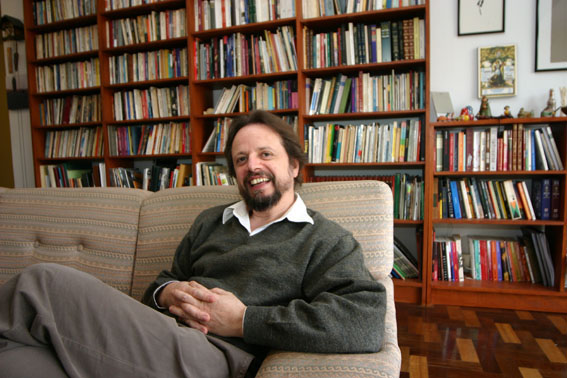
- Born: August 21, 1952 (age 74); Lages, Santa Catarina, Brazil
- Occupations: Author and Professor
- Writing career
- Language: Portuguese
- Genre: Fiction
- Notable work: The Eternal Son
- Notable awards: São Paulo Prize for Literature
- Website: www.cristovaotezza.com.br/index_english.htm

Cristóvão Tezza (born 21 August 1952) is a Brazilian novelist and university professor.

== Biography ==
Cristóvão Tezza was born in Lages, Santa Catarina, Brazil in 1952, but moved to Curitiba in Paraná by the time he was ten. This city would later serve as the backdrop for many of his stories, with characters visiting familiar streets and local attractions.

Tezza had a variety of jobs when he was younger. His experience included time in the theater and the merchant marine, working illegally in Europe, and working as a watchmaker. He really loved this last job, but soon recognized that fixing clocks would not satisfy his desire to work with literature. By the time he was thirteen, Tezza had already finished his first book, one which he himself described as "very bad".

He has published several novels, and a creative autobiography. One of the distinguishing features of his works is the presence of more than one narrator. For example, in his story Trapo the story is told simultaneously from the points of view of both a teacher of poetry, Manoel, and a poet, whose work is studied by Manoel. In 2003, Tezza published an essay on Mikhail Bakhtin, which he had originally written as his doctoral thesis.

Tezza has a doctorate in Brazilian Literature, and was a professor of Linguistics at the Federal University of Paraná. On several occasions he has claimed that only four or five Brazilians could make their living from writing books, and for this reason he became a professor. He won the prize of the Brazilian Academy of Letters for the Best Brazilian Novel in 2004, for his book "O fotógrafo". The magazine Época named him as one of the 100 Most Influential Brazilians of 2009. He also served on the jury to determine the finalists for the 2013 Portugal Telecom Prize. Until recently, Tezza wrote a biweekly column for the Folha de S.Paulo and was a regular contributor to the Gazeta do Povo, in Curitiba. In 2009, following the success of The Eternal Son, Tezza left his position as a university professor to pursue his literary interests full-time.

== The Eternal Son ==
Tezza's most successful work so far has been The Eternal Son (Portuguese: O Filho Eterno), a novel about a father learning to deal with his son's Down's syndrome. In 2008 his book was recognized by the Jabuti Prize, the Portugal Telecom Prize, and the São Paulo Prize for Literature, the last of which came with a cash prize of R$200,000 (roughly US$97,000).

This book was later adapted for the theater by Bruno Lara Resende. The presentation by Cia Atores de Laura, with director Daniel Herz, and actor Charles Fricks was chosen by O Globo as one of the best plays of 2011. The book was also adapted into the 2016 Brazilian film O filho eterno. The film was directed by Paulo Machline and it stars Marcos Veras and Débora Falabella in the main roles.

The Eternal Son has been translated into several languages including English, with the French translation winning the 2009 Prix littéraire Charles-Brisset and the English translation being a finalist for the 2012 International Dublin Literary Award.

== Works ==
=== Short stories ===
- "A Primeira Noite de Liberdade" (1994).

Originally published as a 25 page booklet by the Fundação Cultural de Curitiba & Ócios do Ofício Editora, with only 150 copies. Republished in the digital release of A Cidade Inventada.

=== Short story collections ===
- A Cidade Inventada, Curitiba, PR: Coo Editora (1980).
- Beatriz, Rio de Janeiro, RJ: Record (2011).

=== Novels ===
- Gran Circo das Américas, São Paulo, SP: Editora Brasiliense (1979).
- O Terrorista Lírico, Curitiba, PR: Criar Edições (1981).
- Ensaio da Paixão, Curitiba, PR: Criar Edições (1985).
- Trapo, São Paulo, SP: Editora Brasiliense (1988).
- Aventuras Provisórias, Porto Alegre, RS: Mercado Aberto (1989).
- Juliano Pavollini, Rio de Janeiro, RJ: Editora Record (1989).
- A Suavidade do Vento, Rio de Janeiro, RJ: Editora Record (1991).
- O Fantasma da Infância, Rio de Janeiro, RJ: Editora Record (1994).
- Uma Noite em Curitiba, Rio de Janeiro, RJ: Rocco (1995).
- Breve Espaço entre a Cor e a Sombra, Rio de Janeiro, RJ: Rocco (1998).
- O Fotógrafo, Rio de Janeiro, RJ: Rocco (2004).
- O Filho Eterno, Rio de Janeiro, RJ: Editora Record (2007).
- Um Erro Emocional, Rio de Janeiro, RJ: Editora Record (2010).
- O Professor, Rio de Janeiro, RJ: Editora Record (2014).
- A tradutora, Rio de Janeiro, RJ: Record (2016)
- A tirania do amor, São Paulo, SP: Todavia (2018)
- A tensão superficial do tempo, São Paulo, SP: Todavia (2020)

=== Essays ===
- Entre a Prosa e a Poesia: Bakhtin e o Formalismo Russo, Rio de Janeiro, RJ: Rocco (2003).
- O Espírito Da Prosa: Uma Autobiografia Literária, Rio de Janeiro, RJ: Editora Record (2012).
- Um Operário em Férias, Rio de Janeiro, RJ: Editora Record (2013).

== Adaptations ==
=== Theater ===
- Trapo. Text adapted for theater by Cristóvão Tezza himself. Directed by Ariel Coelho, with Mark Winter, Cláudio Mamberti, and Imara Reis in the cast. Originally staged in Curitiba and various locations in Paraná in 1992.
- O Filho Eterno. Text adapted for theater by Bruno Lara Resende. Directed by Daniel Herz, with Charles Fricks in the cast. Originally staged by Companhia Atores de Laura in Rio de Janeiro and various locations in Brazil in 2011.

=== Film ===
- O Filho Eterno. Produced by RT Features. Directed by Paulo Machline. Release date: 2016.
- Juliano Pavollini. Produced and directed by Caio Blat. Still in production. Expected release date: 2015.

=== Translations ===
- Bambino Per Sempre, Milan: Sperling & Kupfer (2008)

Italian translation of O Filho Eterno by Maria Baiocchi

- El Fill Etern, Barcelona: Club Editor (2009)

Catalan translation of O Filho Eterno by Josep Domènech Ponsatí

- Eeuwig Kind, Amsterdam: Contact (2009)

Dutch translation of O Filho Eterno by Arie Pos

- Le Fils Du Printemps, Paris: Editeur Métailié (2009)

French translation of O Filho Eterno by Sébastien Roy

- The Eternal Son, Carlton North, VIC: Scribe Publications (2010)

English translation of O Filho Eterno by Alison Entrekin

- Noč V Curitibi, Novo mesto: Goga (2011)

Slovenian translation of Uma Noite em Curitiba, by Nina Kovič

- Een Emotionele Fout, Amsterdam: Contact (2011)

Dutch translation of Um Erro Emocional by Arie Pos

- El Hijo Eterno, Ciudad de México: Editorial Elephas (2012)

Spanish translation of O Filho Eterno by María Teresa Atrián Pineda

- Večni sin, Ljubljana: Modrijan (2013)

Slovenian translation of O Filho Eterno by Katja Zakrajšek

- 永远的菲利普, Beijing: People's Literature Publishing House (2014)

Chinese translation of O Filho Eterno by 马琳

- Brief Space Between Color and Shade, Seattle: AmazonCrossing (2014)

English translation of Breve Espaço entre a Cor e a Sombra by Alan R. Clarke
