= Oscar Nakasato =

Brazilian writer

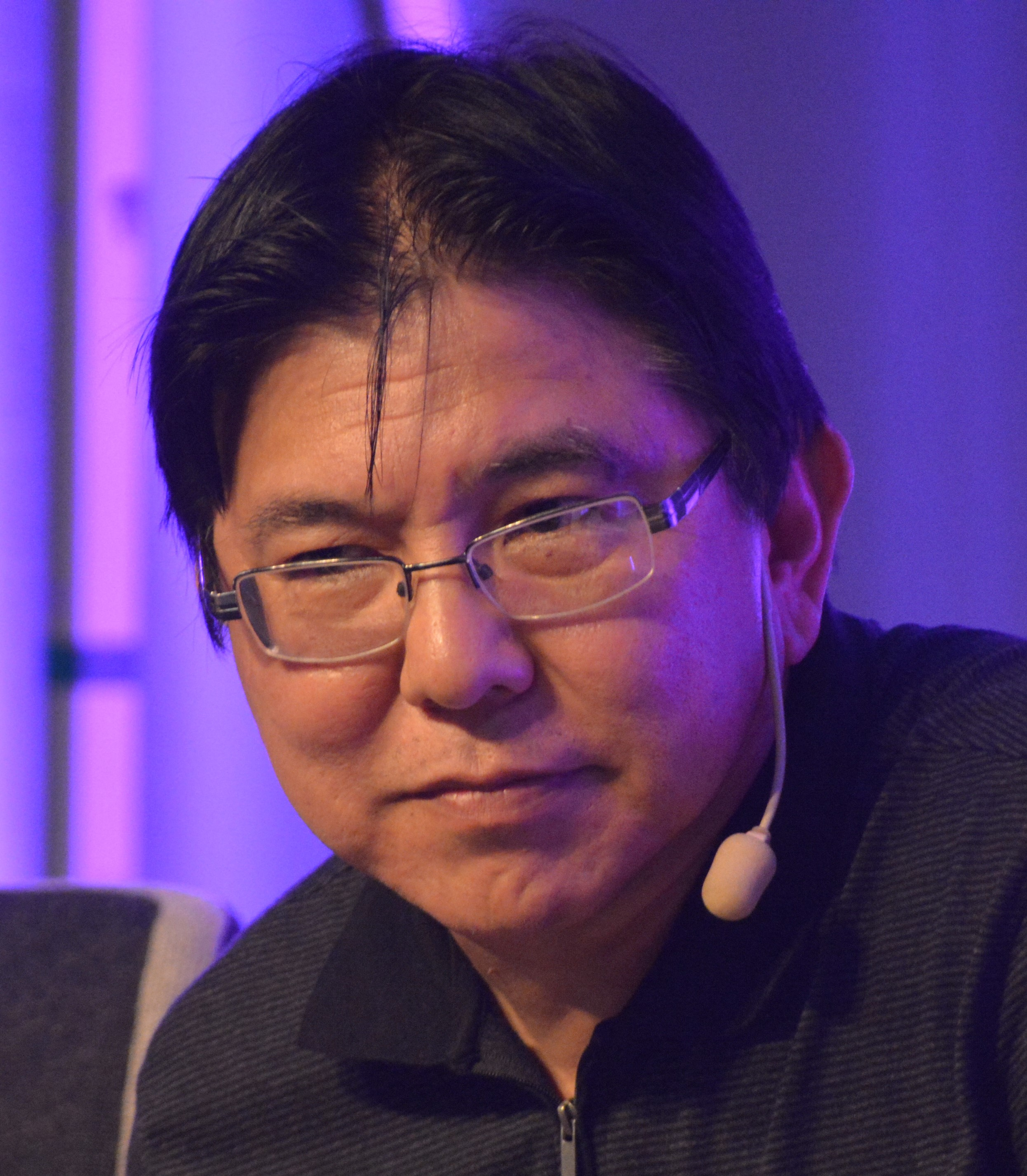
Image of Oscar Nakasato

Oscar Nakasato is a Brazilian writer of ethnic Japanese origin. He was born in Maringa, Parana, and he now teaches at the Federal University of Technology, Paraná.

Nakasato is best known for his debut novel Nihonjin (2011), which won the Benvirá Prize, the Bunkyo Prize and the coveted Jabuti Prize for best novel. Nihonjin has been adapted into an animated feature.

Nakasato's other books include Dois and Ojiichan.
