= Michel Laub =

Brazilian writer and journalist

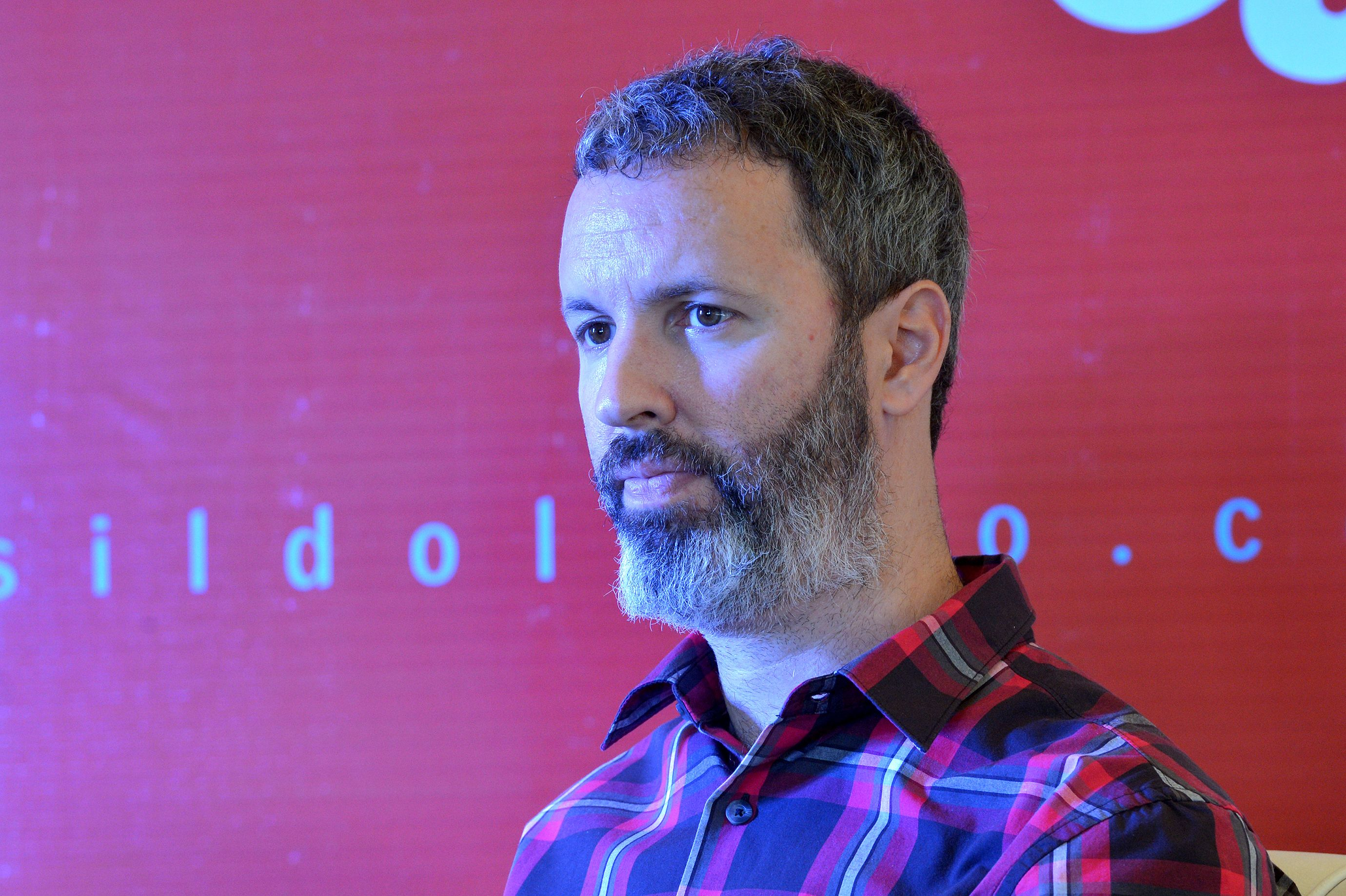
- Born: 1973 (age 52–53) Porto Alegre, Brazil

Michel Laub (born 1973 in Porto Alegre) is a Brazilian writer and journalist.

== Biography ==
Laub graduated in Law at the Federal University of Rio Grande do Sul in 1996. He also enrolled in the Journalism at PUC-RS, but did not complete he course. He worked for a few months as a lawyer in Porto Alegre, his hometown, but gave up the career.

Laub wrote about business and politics for the magazines Carta Capital and República. In 1997, he moved to São Paulo, where he worked on Bravo! magazine, which became managing editor. In 1998 published his first book, the short story collection Não depois do que aconteceu.

He was the coordinator of publications and courses of Moreira Salles Institute, later assuming the function of editor for their website.

His first novel Música Anterior was published in 2001. In 2005 he was awarded a scholarship from Fundação Vitae, which enabled him to write O Segundo Tempo. Diário da Queda (published in English as Diary of the Fall), written with support from a grant from Funarte, was his first work to address his Jewish origins, from the diaries of his grandfather, a survivor of the concentration camp of Auschwitz.

== Awards and honors ==
- 2002 Erico Verissimo Award from União Brasileira de Escritores (Brazilian Union of Writers) New Author Category for Música Anterior
- 2012 Brasilia Prize for Literature in category Novel during the 1st Bienal de Brasília do Livro e Literatura for Diary of the Fall
- ???? Bravo Award / Bradesco for Best Novel for Diary of the Fall
- ???? Granta Magazine "The Best of Young Brazilian Writers"
- 2012 Portugal Telecom Award shortlist for Diary of the Fall
- 2015 Jewish Quarterly-Wingate Prize winner for Diary of the Fall (Translated by Margaret Jull Costa)

== Published works ==
- 1998 - Não Depois do que Aconteceu - short stories
- 2001 - Música anterior - novel
- 2004 - Longe da água - novel
- 2006 - O segundo tempo - novel
- 2009 - O gato diz adeus - novel
- 2011 - Diary of the Fall - novel
- 2013 - A maçã envenenada- novel
- 2016 - O Tribunal da quinta-feira- novel
- 2020 - Solução de dois estados - novel
