= Silviano Santiago =

Brazilian poet and writer

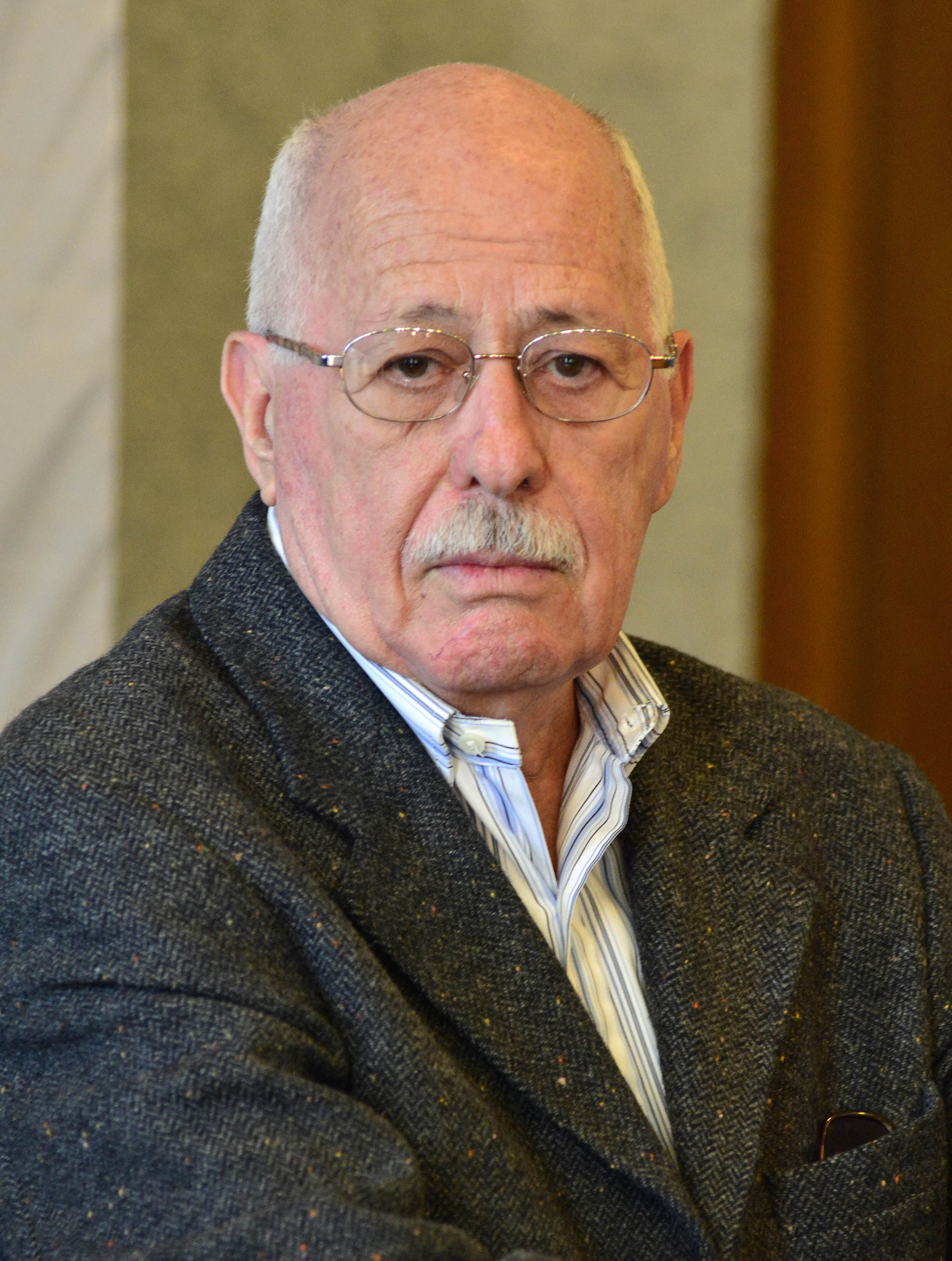
- Born: September 26, 1936 (age 89) Formiga, Minas Gerais, Brazil

Silviano Santiago (born 29 September 1936) is a Brazilian writer, literary critic, essayist and scholar. In 2013, he was awarded the Prêmio Machado de Assis for his body of work.

== Early life ==
Santiago was born in the city of Formiga. At the age of ten, he moved to Belo Horizonte. In 1954, he began writing for a film magazine and helped to idealize and publish the magazine Complemento. He got a degree in Neolatin languages at the Federal University of Minas Gerais

Santiago moved to Rio de Janeiro in 1961, where specialized in French literature, which will lead him to a doctorate at the University of Paris, Sorbonne.

He applied as an instructor at the University of New Mexico in Albuquerque from 1962 to 1964. In 1969, he published in an anthology of Brazilian literature in New York.

Santiago taught at the Rutgers, Toronto, New York, Buffalo and Indiana universities. In Brazil, he was a professor at the Pontifical Catholic University of Rio de Janeiro and at the Fluminense Federal University.

== Works ==
- 1955 Os velhos (short story ).
- 1960 4 poetas (poetry).
- 1961 Duas faces (short stories, coauthored by Ivan Ângelo).
- 1969 Brasil: prosa e poesia (Anthology published in New York).
- 1970 Salto (poems). O banquete (short stories).
- 1974 O olhar (novel).
- 1975 Ariano Suassuna (Anthology). Iracema ( commented version of the work byJosé de Alencar).
- 1976 Carlos Drummond de Andrade (essays). Glossário de Derrida (supervisor of the work by his students at the Masters' course of Letters at PUC-RJ).
- 1978 Crescendo durante a guerra numa província ultramarina (poemas). Uma literatura nos trópicos; essays sobre dependência cultural (essays).
- 1981 Em liberdade (novel).
- 1982 Vale quanto pesa; essays sobre questões político-culturais (essays).
- 1985 Stella Manhattan (novel). Poemas (Translation of the book by Jacques Prévert).
- 1988 Brasilianische Literatur der Zeit der Militärherrschaft (1964–1988) (organization).
- 1989 Nas malhas da letra (essays).
- 1993 Uma história de família (novel). Viagem ao México (novel).
- 1995 Cheiro forte (poems). Por que amo Barthes (Translation of the book by Alain Robbe-Grillet).
- 1996 Keith Jarrett no Blue Note (improvisos de jazz) (short stories).
- 1999 De cócoras (novel).
- 2000 Intérpretes do Brasil (organization).
- 2001 The Space in-between - essays on Latin American culture (essays anthology published byr Ana Lúcia Gazzola, at Duke University Press).
- 2002 Carlos e Mário (organization and notes of the collected letters between Mário de Andrade ad Carlos Drummond de Andrade).
- 2003 República das Letras, de Gonçalves Dias a Ana Cristina César: cartas de escritores brasileiros: 1965-1995 (organization).
- 2004 O Cosmopolitismo do Pobre: Crítica Literária e Crítica Cultural (essays). O Falso Mentiroso: memórias (novel).
- 2005 Histórias Mal Contadas (short stories).
- 2006 As Raízes e o Labirinto da América Latina (essays). A Vida como Literatura: o amanuense Belmiro (essays).Ora (Direis) puxar conversa! (essays).
- 2008 Heranças (novel).
- 2010 Anônimos (short stories).
- 2014 Mil Rosas Roubadas.
- 2016 Machado (novel).
- 2017 Genealogia da Ferocidade (análise da obra Grande Sertão: Veredas de Guimarães Rosa)

== Honors ==
- 2005 -Ordem do Mérito Cultural
- 2013 -Prêmio Machado de Assis
- 2015- Prêmio Oceanos of Best Novel, for Mil Rosas roubadas.
- 2022 - Prêmio Camões
