= Taiasmin Ohnmacht =

Brazilian writer

Taiasmin Ohnmacht is a Brazilian writer. She was born in Porto Alegre, to a white father and a black mother. She is a trained psychoanalyst.

Her book Vozes de Retratos Íntimos (2021) won the Prêmio Açorianos de Literatura and the Premio AGES in the Long Narrative category. It was also shortlisted for the Premio Jabuti, the most important literary prize in Brazil. In addition, she has written the following:

- Ela Conta Ele Canta (2016), co-authored with the poet Carlos Alberto Soares
- Visite o Decorado (2019)
- Uma Chance de Continuarmos Assim (2023)

Uma Chance was inspired by the science fiction of American writer Octavia Butler.
