= Osório Alves de Castro =

Brazilian novelist

Osório de Castro Alves (born 1898/1901?, died 1978) was a Brazilian novelist, tailor and communist. The son of a notary public, he was born in Santa Maria da Vitória where he lived until 1922. He moved and lived in cities like Rio de Janeiro, São Paulo, Bauru, Lins and Marília.

He wrote about "barranqueiro" life along the São Francisco river, and won the 1962 Jabuti Prize for Literature for his novel Porto Calendar (1961). He maintained an epistolary friendship with the writer Guimarães Rosa, who was a big fan of Osorio's writings.

Osório died in Itapecerica da Serra, in an old home, at the age of 80. He left his second novel Maria Fecha a Porta prau boi no te pegar (published by Editora Symbol in 1978), and other manuscripts like Bahiano Tietê Nhonhô Pedreira and A cidade do Velho.

His life was the subject of a monograph by Eliana Nogueira de Lima Pastana.
