= Micheliny Verunschk =

Brazilian writer and poet

Micheliny Verunschk (born 1972) is a Brazilian writer.

Verunschk was born in Recife. She obtained her doctorate from Pontifícia Universidade Católica de São Paulo. She debuted in literature in 2003 with the book of poems Geografia Intima do Deserto, nominated for that year's Prêmio Portugal Telecom. For her first novel, Nossa Teresa - Vida e morte de uma santa suicida, she was awarded the São Paulo Prize for Literature in the debut author over 40 category. Her novel O som do rugido da onça won the Premio Jabuti in 2022.

== Selected works ==
- Geografia Íntima do Deserto (poetry collection, 2003)
- O Observador e o Nada (poetry collection, 2003)
- A Cartografia da Noite (2010)
- B de bruxa (2014)
- Nossa Teresa: vida e morte de uma santa suicida (novel, 2015 Prêmio São Paulo)
- Desmoronamentos (short story collection, 2022)
- O som do rugido da onça (novel, 2022 Premio Jabuti)
  - English translation: The Jaguar's Roar: A Novel (translated by Juliana Barbassa; Liveright, 2025. ISBN 978-1324097464)
