= Domingos Pellegrini =

Domingos Pellegrini (born 1949) is a Brazilian writer. He was born in Londrina, in the Southern Brazilian state of Paraná. He worked as a journalist after graduation. His first book O Homem Vermelho , a short story collection, appeared in 1977 and won the Premio Jabuti. Other works of note include:

- Os Meninos (The Boys)
- Terra Vermelha (Red Land)
- O Caso da Chácara Chão (The Case of the Country Bungalow)
- No Coração das Perobas
- Meninos no Poder

Pellegrini has won the Jabuti Prize six times, including three times in the Literary Novel category.
