= Renato Modernell =

Renato Modernell (born 1953) is a Brazilian writer. He was born in Rio Grande, Rio Grande do Sul. He graduated from Fundação Armando Alvares Penteado in 1975, and later studied at Universidade de São Paulo and Universidade Presbiteriana Mackenzie. He also taught at Mackenzie for many years.

He is best known for his novel Sonata de Ultima Cidade which won the Premio Jabuti. Other books include Gird, Che Bandoneon and Viagem ao Pavio da Vela.
