= Edney Silvestre =

Edney Silvestre (born 1955) is a Brazilian writer and journalist. He worked for TV Globo for 30 years, from 1992 to 2022. Working as a foreign correspondent in New York City, he was the first Brazilian journalist on site during the 9/11 attacks. He also covered the Iraq War.

As a writer, he is best known for his novels Se eu fechar os olhos agora ( "If I close my eyes now"; winner of the Premio Jabuti) and A felicidade e fácil ("Happiness is easy"). Both novels have been translated into English.

Silvestre lives in Rio de Janeiro.
