= Tia Lenita =

Maria Helena Miranda de Figueiredo (1927-2024), better known as Tia Lenita (Aunt Lenita), was a Brazilian journalist and writer. She was born in Belenzinho, São Paulo. A pioneering female journalist, she was for a long time associated with the São Paulo newspaper Folha de São Paulo, where she created the children's supplement Folhinha. She had also worked at Diário de São Paulo and at O Tempo. Under the editor Herminio Sachetta, she worked at both O Tempo and Shopping News.

As a writer, she is known for her novel O sexo começa às Sete which won the Prêmio Jabuti in 1971. A decade earlier, her debut novel Deus Aposentado had also been commended by the Prêmio Jabuti.

Tia Lenita died in June 2024.
