= Grupo Editorial Record =

Brazilian publishing group

- Industry: Publishing
- Founded: 1943
- Headquarters: Rio de Janeiro, Brazil
- Website: editorarecord.com.br

Grupo Editorial Record is a Brazilian publishing group, one of the largest in Latin America.

It was founded in 1943 by Alfredo Machado and Décio de Abreu as Distribuidora Record de Serviços de Imprensa, a comic strip and feature syndicate.

The group publishes around eight thousand book titles of fiction and non-fiction by authors such as Graciliano Ramos, Sidney Sheldon, Gabriel García Márquez, Isabel Allende, Albert Camus and Colleen Hoover, and owns 13 labels; the main one, Editora Record, was established in the 1950 decade. Several of those labels were independent publishing houses purchased by Record, such as Editora Civilização Brasileira, founded by Ênio Silveira in 1932 and José Olympio Editora, founded in 1931.

== Labels ==
- Editora Record
- Rosa dos Tempos
- Nova Era
- Bertrand Brasil
- Editora Civilização Brasileira
- José Olympio Editora
- Best Seller
- BestBolso
- Galera Record
- Galerinha
- Paz & Terra
- Difel
- Viva Livros
