= Julián Fuks =

Brazilian writer (born 1981)

- Born: Julián Miguel Barbero Fuks; 1981 (age 44–45); São Paulo, São Paulo (state), Brazil
- Education: University of São Paulo
- Occupations: novelist, short story writer, cronista
- Writing career
- Notable work: Resistance
- Notable awards: Prêmio Jabuti (2016); Oceanos Prize (2016); José Saramago Literary Prize (2017); Anna Seghers Prize (2018)

Julián Fuks (born 1981) is a Brazilian writer.

== Life and career ==
Fuks was born in São Paulo to Argentine parents, who left their country fleeing from the dictatorship. He graduated in journalism and has a master's degree in literary theory at University of São Paulo. He has worked for the newspaper Folha de São Paulo and for the magazine Cult. His first book Fragmentos de Alberto, Ulisses, Carolina e eu was published in 2004. He has since published several more books, winning a number of literary prizes. His 2015 autofictional novel Resistance won the Jabuti Award for Book of the Year (2016), the Oceanos Prize (2016), the José Saramago Literary Prize (2017) and the Anna Seghers Prize (2018). It has been translated into English by Daniel Hahn.

Fuks was chosen as one of Granta magazine's Best of Young Brazilian Novelists in 2012. He worked with Mia Couto as part of the Rolex Mentor and Protégé Arts Initiative. He lives in São Paulo.

== Works ==
- 2004 - Fragmentos de Alberto, Ulisses, Carolina e eu
- 2007 - Histórias de literatura e cegueira
- 2012 - Procura do romance
- 2015 - A resistência
  - English translation: Resistance. Translated by Daniel Hahn; London, Charco Press, 2018. ISBN 9781999859329
- 2019 - A ocupação
  - English translation: Occupation. Translated by Daniel Hahn; London, Charco Press, 2021. ISBN 9781916277878.
- 2022 - Lembremos do futuro: Crônicas do tempo da morte do tempo
