= Sérgio Rodrigues (author) =

Brazilian writer and journalist (born 1962)

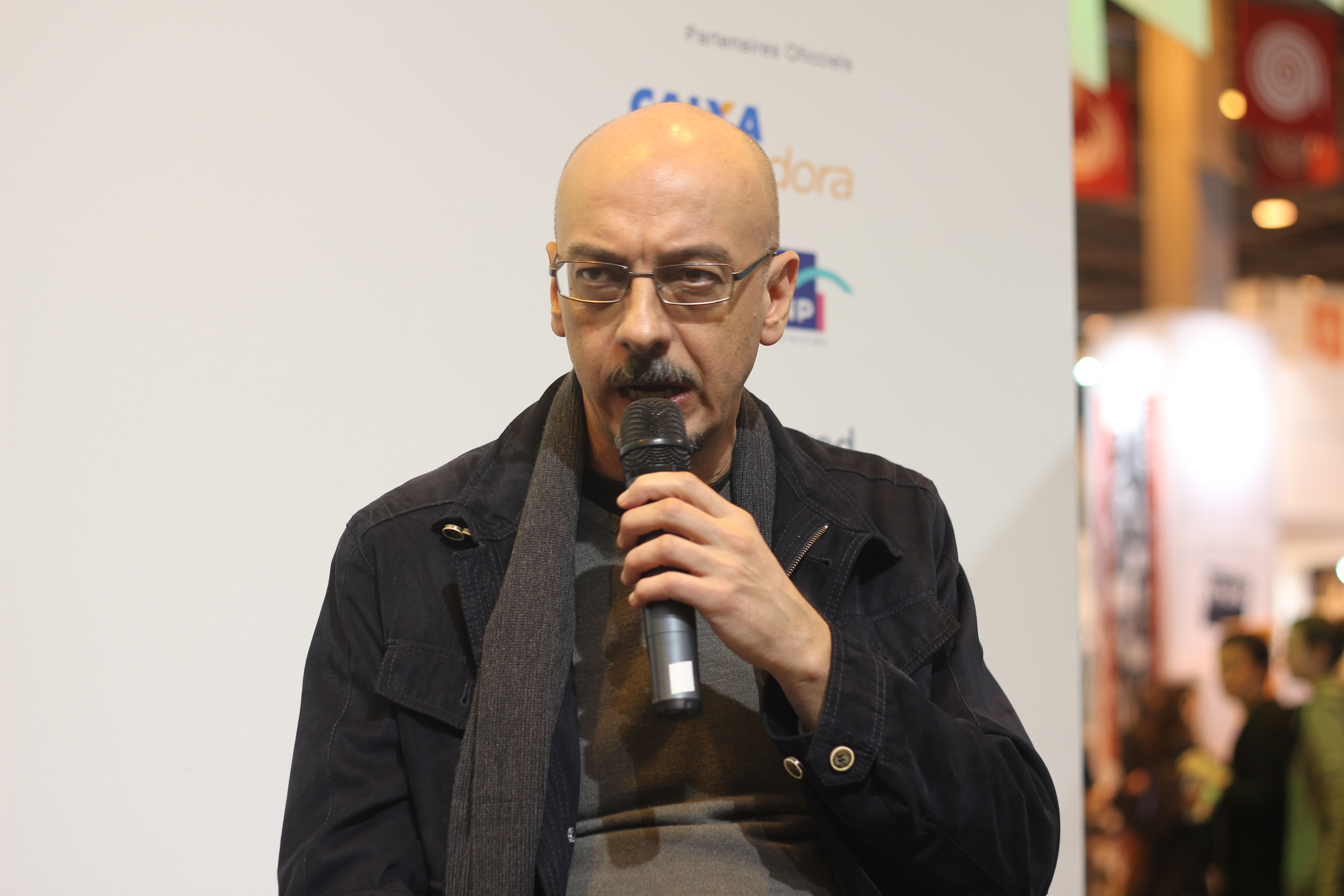
- speaking at the 2015 Paris Book Fair
- Born: 1962 (age 63–64); Muriaé, Brazil
- Occupations: fiction writer, literary critic, columnist and journalist
- Website: srodrigues.com.br

Sérgio Rodrigues (born in 1962) is a Brazilian fiction writer, literary critic, columnist and journalist—winner of the 2014 Prêmio Portugal Telecom de Literatura for his book O drible (published by Companhia das Letras) [The Feint]. His books have been translated to English, French, Spanish and Danish.

== Works in English ==
- Elza: The Girl (novel, 2014)

== Works in Portuguese ==
- O homem que matou o escritor (stories, 2000)
- Manual do mané (humor, 2003), with co-authors Arthur Dapieve and Gustavo Poli
- What língua is esta? (chronicles and articles, 2005)
- As sementes de Flowerville (novel, 2006)
- Elza, a garota (novel, 2009)
- Sobrescritos: 40 histórias de escritores, excretores e outros insensatos (stories, 2010)
- O drible (novel, 2013)
- Jules Rimet, meu amor (novel, 2014)
- Viva a língua brasileira! (almanac, 2016)
- Cartas Brasileiras (letter compilation, 2017)
- A vida futura (novel, 2022)
