= Emil Farhat =

Brazilian writer

Emil Farhat (1914–2000) was a Brazilian writer. He was born in Maripá de Minas to a family of Arab immigrant origin. He worked as a journalist and marketing professional; in the latter capacity, he rose to become the head of the Brazilian branch of the American ad firm McCann Erickson.

As a writer, he won the 1988 Premio Jabuti for his epistolary novel Dinheiro na Estrada. It recounted the immigrant experience of his Lebanese ancestors. He was one of several Arab-Brazilian writers (such as Salim Miguel and Gilberto Abrao) who explored their ancestral roots in their fiction. Other notable works by Farhat include:

- O País dos Coitadinhos (1968)
- Outras obras destacadas: Educação, a nova ideologia (1975)
- O Paraíso do Vira-Bosta (1987)
- Memórias Ouvidas e Vividas (1999)

He died in São Paulo in 2000.
