= José Roberto Torero =

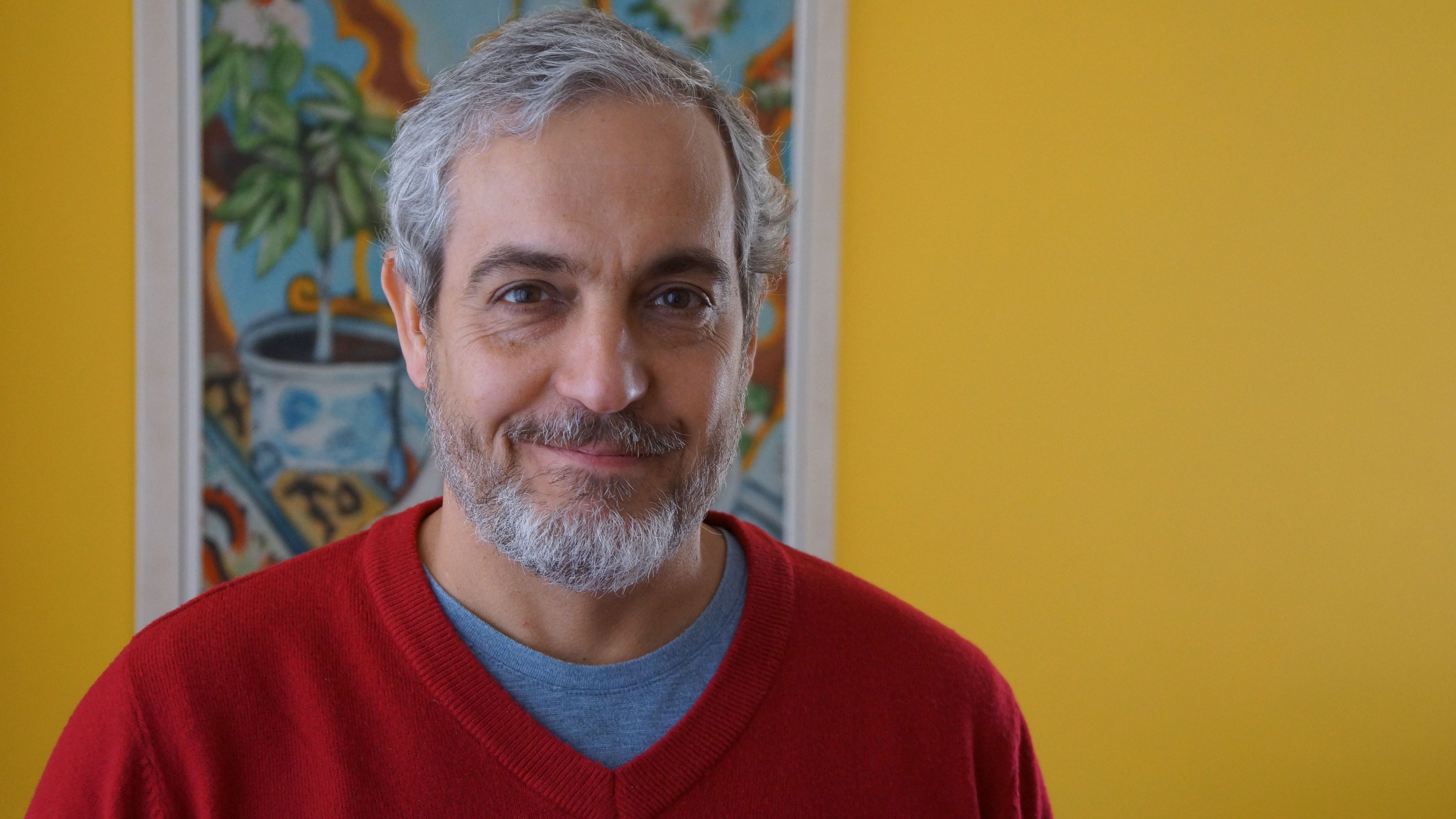
- Born: 9 October 1963
- Occupations: writer screenwriter film director

José Roberto Torero (born 1963) is a Brazilian writer and film director. He was born in Santos, São Paulo. He has won the Prêmio Jabuti for his books O Chalaça (1995) and Pequenos Amores (2002). He is also a screenwriter and director, known for his work on films such as Como fazer um filme de amor. Another of his popular works is Uma História de Futebol, released as a short film and also as a children's book.
