= Fabiane Guimarães =

Brazilian writer (born 1991)

Fabiane Guimarães is a Brazilian writer.

== Life and career ==
Guimarães was born in Goiás in 1991, growing up in the town of Formosa. She studied journalism at the University of Brasília, and she still lives in the Brazilian federal capital. She is best known for her two novels: Como se fosse um monstro, which was a finalist for the Premio Jabuti, and Apague a luz se for chorar, which was a finalist for the Sao Paulo Prize for Literature.
