= Elvira Vigna =

Brazilian writer, illustrator and journalist

- Born: 29 September 1947; Rio de Janeiro, Brazil
- Died: 10 July 2017 (aged 69)
- Occupation(s): Writer, illustrator, journalist

Elvira Vigna (29 September 1947 – 10 July 2017) was a Brazilian writer, illustrator and journalist.

== Biography ==
Born in Rio de Janeiro and raised in São Paulo, she graduated in literature at the University of Nancy in 1974 and a master's degree at the Federal University of Rio de Janeiro. She wrote for newspapers such as O Globo and O Estado de S. Paulo and edited the literary magazine A Pomba.

She wrote and illustrated children's books in the beginning of her career, moving to novels later. Vigna's works won literary prizes such as the Jabuti Prize, Machado de Assis and Oceanos.

Vigna died on 10 July 2017 in São Paulo from cancer, aged 69.

== Bibliography ==
=== Novels ===
- 1988 – Sete anos e um dia
- 1997 – O assassinato de Bebê Martê
- 1998 – Às seis em ponto.
- 2002 – Coisas que os homens não entendem
- 2006 – Deixei ele lá e vim
- 2010 – Por Escrito
- 2012 – O que deu pra fazer em matéria de história de amor
- 2016– Como se estivéssemos em palimpsesto de putas

=== Children's books ===
- 1971–1983 Asdrúbal series:
  - A breve história de Asdrúbal, o Terrível;
  - A verdadeira história de Asdrúbal, o Terrível;
  - Asdrúbal no Museu;
  - O triste fim de Asdrúbal, o Terrível.
- 1978 – Viviam como gato e cachorro
- 1979 – Lã de umbigo
- 1982 – Uma história pelo meio
- 1983 – A pontinha menorzinha do enfeitinho do fim do cabo de uma colherzinha de café
- 1996 – Mônica e Macarra
- 2001 – O jogo dos limites.
- 2013 – Vitória Valentina
