= Luis S. Krausz =

Luis Sergio Krausz (born 1961) is a Brazilian novelist. He comes from a family of Austrian Jews who fled to Brazil in the 1920s. His first book Desterro: memórias em ruínas (2011) deals with this milieu as do his subsequent novels Deserto (2013) and Bazar Paraná (2015). Bazar Paraná was nominated for the Premio Jabuti. Recent books include "O livro da imitação e do esquecimento" (2017), Outro lugar (2017), Opulência (2020) and O outono dos ipês-rosas (2024).

Krausz has a PhD in Jewish literature from the University of Sao Paulo, where he is now a professor.
