= Charles Cosac =

Brazilian book editor

Charles Cosac (born 1964) is a Brazilian book editor and art curator. He is best known for co-founding the defunct publishing house Cosac Naify, noted for its luxury designed editions of books on literature, the arts, anthropology, theatre, and children's literature.

== Biography ==
Born in Rio de Janeiro into a wealthy family of Syrian origin, Cosac spent his childhood in the Urca neighbourhood and in Petrópolis, raised in a strict and deeply religious family environment. He attended a private school directed by his aunt before moving to the United Kingdom, where he studied English, mathematics, and art history, continuing his formation at the University of Essex, in Colchester. He completed his education at the University of Saint Petersburg, with a doctorate on the Russian painter Kazimir Malevich.

At the time of his doctorate, Cosac had already built a large art collection focused on Baroque and Latin-American pieces, many of which he donated to the Essex Collection of Art from Latin America (ESCALA).

In 1996, settled in São Paulo, he founded the publishing house Cosac Naify, which debuted with the book Barroco de Lírios, by Tunga. Over the years, Cosac Naify established itself as a reference in the market of art books, with titles such as Storia dell arte italiana, by Giulio Carlo Argan, illustrated and divided into three volumes, and Pierro della Francesca, by Roberto Longhi, with a preface by Carlo Ginzburg. Other titles included Les Miserables, Moby-Dick, and Anna Karenina, as well as books by Brazilian writers, such as Murilo Mendes and Manuel Bandeira. The carefully designed editions, combined with rigorous editorial standards, made the house one of Brazil's most prestigious.

After a period of financial deficit, Charles Cosac announced the closure of the company, explaining that it had distanced itself from its original purposes. In November 2023, he returned to the book market with the imprint Cosac Edições, dedicated to publishing Brazilian authors.
