= Edival Lourenço =

Edival Lourenço (born 1952) is a Brazilian poet and author. He was born in Iporá, Goiás. He studied law and worked at the Caixa Econômica Federal. He has published widely in both fiction and non-fiction genres, including poetry, short stories and novels. His novel Naquele morros, depois da chuva won second place in the 2012 Jabuti Award for literary novels. He lives in Goiânia, Goiás.
