= Fausto Wolff =

Brazilian journalist and writer

Faustin von Wolffenbüttel (1940–2008), better known as Fausto Wolff, was a Brazilian journalist and writer. A native of Santo Ângelo, Rio Grande do Sul, he entered journalism in his teens, a profession he pursued for the next half century. He was also a prolific writer and published in many genres: plays, stories, poems, essays, etc. His novel A mão esquerda (The Left Hand) won the Premio Jabuti in 1997. He was married to the writer Mônica Tolipan.
