= Dalton Trevisan =

Brazilian writer (1925–2024)

- Born: 14 June 1925; Curitiba, Paraná, Brazil
- Died: 9 December 2024 (aged 99); Curitiba, Paraná, Brazil
- Education: Federal University of Paraná
- Occupation: Writer
- Writing career
- Notable awards: Prêmio Machado de Assis (2011), Camões Prize (2012)

Dalton Jérson Trevisan (14 June 1925 – 9 December 2024) was a Brazilian short story writer. He published more than thirty collections of short stories. He was awarded the 2011 Prêmio Machado de Assis and the 2012 Camões Prize.

== Life and work ==
Trevisan grew up in Curitiba, where his father owned a small lamp and glass factory next door to the family home. Trevisan graduated from the Federal University of Paraná with a degree in legal studies, but he seldom worked in the law profession.

In the 1940s, Trevisan created and edited the literary magazine Joaquim. The magazine "reported on debates centered on the challenging ideas belonging to the new generation of modern artists" and sought to "question the concepts of ethics and aesthetics that were in style at that time in Brazil." The Public Library of Paraná states that the magazine brought Paraná into mainstream Brazilian literary discourse and describes the magazine as essential to understanding the cultural trajectory of the state. The magazine published 21 issues and circulated between April 1946 and December 1948. It provided the first publication in Portuguese for work by James Joyce, T. S. Eliot, Franz Kafka, Louis Aragon, Tristan Tzara, García Lorca, Rainer Maria Rilke, André Gide, and Jean-Paul Sartre. Other contributors included Vinícius de Moraes, Carlos Drummond, Mário de Andrade, Oswald de Andrade, and Antônio Cândido. Joaquim also published original artwork by visual artists such as Candido Portinari, Di Cavalcanti, Guido Viaro, and Poty Lazzarotto. Lazzarotto continued to work with Trevisan as an editorial partner and illustrator over the following decades.

After two early novels, which he later disowned, Trevisan published his debut short story collection, Novelas Nada Exemplares, in 1959. It brought him his first Prêmio Jabuti. As in all the collections he went on to publish over the next half century, the stories are inspired by daily life in Curitiba, his hometown. Among his other most notable collections are Cemitério de Elefantes (1964), which won the Fernando Chinaglia Prize and a second Prêmio Jabuti, Morte na Praça (1964), which won the Luís Cláudio de Sousa Prize, O Vampiro de Curitiba (1965), Ah é? (1994), which has been credited with popularising the mini-story in Brazil, Pico na Veia (2002), for which he was the co-winner of the First Portugal Telecom Award for Brazilian Literature, and Desgracida (2010), for which he won a third Prêmio Jabuti.

In 1972, translator Gregory Rabassa translated Novelas Nada Exemplares and O Vampiro de Curitiba into English. As of 2025, these remain the only English translations of Trevisan's collections. Two translated stories, "The Corpse in the Parlor" and "The Vampire of Curitiba", are included in the English-language Oxford Anthology of the Brazilian Short Story. His works have also been translated into other languages, including Spanish, German, and Swedish.

A number of Trevisan's stories have been adapted into films, including Guerra Conjugal (1974), which won several awards including the Candango Trophy for Best Film in 1975.

Trevisan lived in the same house in Curitiba for almost all his adult life, only moving to an apartment in the same city in 2021, during the COVID-19 pandemic. He rarely went out or received visitors, and he did not attend award ceremonies or give interviews. His reclusive behavior and the content of his work earned him the nickname "The Vampire of Curitiba", after one of his most famous short stories, the title story of his 1965 collection, O Vampiro de Curitiba.

Trevisan died in Curitiba on 9 December 2024, at the age of 99.

== Writing style and reception ==
Trevisan's stories are "inverted moral fables" that satirise the ethics and sexual mores of the middle class. His stories have been described as "lurid scenes of sex and death among the lower middle classes". World Literature Today described his stories as depicting "blood-soaked violence, primarily the domestic kind frequently splashed across lurid tabloids that sensationalize the conjugal warfare between oppressive husbands and oppressed wives." However, he was also noted for depicting the "loneliness, moral dilemmas and contradictions of the middle class, with a keen eye for the excluded and marginalized" and for "literary rigor, creativity and a sharp and relentless vision of human beings". His work is also noted for its dark humour.

Trevisan is known as a writer of very short stories. There were 44 stories in his first collection and his stories grew increasingly more condensed. He experimented with very short forms, including the Japanese Haibun. K. David Jackson's introduction to the Oxford Anthology of the Brazilian Short Story describes Trevisan as a modernist innovator, who "continues to pare his stories, which demolish bourgeois desire, until arriving at the mini-story, or minimalist form."

Trevisan is noted for having published almost exclusively short stories, with only one novel among his mature works. He has been called "a Brazilian master of the genre" and "one of the preeminent modern short story writers."

== Honors and awards ==
In 2012 Trevisan won the Camões Prize, the leading prize for Portuguese language literature.

In 2011, he was awarded Brazil's Prêmio Machado de Assis for his body of work.

He has won the Prêmio Jabuti three times. He also won the Prêmio Ministério da Cultura de Literatura in 1996 and was the co-winner of the Prêmio Portugal Telecom de Literatura Brasileira in 2003.

== Works ==
- Abismo de Rosas (1976)
- Ah, É? (1994)
- A Faca No Coração (1975)
- A Guerra Conjugal (1969)
- A Polaquinha (1985) (novel)
- Arara Bêbada (2004)
- A Trombeta do Anjo Vingador (1977)
- Capitu Sou Eu (2003)
- Cemitério de Elefantes (1964)
- 111 Ais (2000)
- Chorinho Brejeiro (1981)
- Contos Eróticos (1984)
- Crimes de Paixão (1978)
- Desgracida (2010)
- Desastres do Amor (1968)
- Dinorá – Novos Mistérios (1994)
- 234 (1997)
- Em Busca de Curitiba Perdida (1992)
- Essas Malditas Mulheres (1982)
- Gente Em Conflito (with Antônio de Alcântara Machado) (2004)
- Lincha Tarado (1980)
- Macho não ganha flor (2006)
- Meu Querido Assassino (1983)
- Morte na Praça (1964)
- Mistérios de Curitiba (1968)
- Noites de Amor em Granada
- Novelas nada Exemplares (1959)
- 99 Corruíras Nanicas (2002)
- O Grande Deflorador (2002)
- O Pássaro de Cinco Asas (1974)
- O Rei da Terra (1972)
- O Vampiro de Curitiba (1965) (The Vampire of Curitiba)
- Pão e Sangue (1988)
- Pico na veia (2002)
- Primeiro Livro de Contos (1979)
- Quem tem medo de vampiro? (1998)
- Vinte Contos Menores (1979)
- Virgem Louca, Loucos Beijos (1979)
- Vozes do Retrato – Quinze Histórias de Mentiras e Verdades (1998)
