= Maria Valéria Rezende =

Brazilian writer and nun (born 1942)

Maria Valéria Rezende (born 1942) is a Brazilian writer and nun. She is a recipient of the Jabuti Prize, Casa de las Américas Prize, and São Paulo Prize for Literature.

== Biography ==
Rezende was born in Santos. She was a member of the National Student Youth Catholic leadership and, after the 1964 coup d'état, housed militants fighting against the military regime. She joined the Congregation of Our Lady -Canonesses of St. Augustine in 1965

Rezende graduated in French language and literature from the University of Nancy and in Pedagogy from PUC-SP. She holds a master's degree in sociology from the Federal University of Paraíba. In the 1960s she began to work with popular education, working in different regions of the country and on all continents, in educator training programs. Rezende lived in the backlands of Pernambuco in Recife / Olinda from December 1972 to 1976. She moved to Paraíba in 1976, living in Brejo Paraibano and, since 1988, in João Pessoa.

She published several fiction and non-fiction works. Her debut in literature was in 2001, with the book Vasto Mundo. She won the 2009 Jabuti Prize in the category of children's literature with No risco do caracol, in 2013, juvenile category, with Ouro dentro da cabeça and in 2015 in the categories romance and Book of the Year of Fiction, with Quarenta dias.

In January 2017, she received the Casa de las Américas Prize for the book Outros Cantos, and for the same novel she won the São Paulo Prize for Literature and the third place at the Jabuti Prize in November 2017.

== Works ==
=== Novels ===
- Vasto Mundo 2001
- O Voo da Guará Vermelha – 2005
- Quarenta Dias - 2014
- Outros cantos - 2016
- Carta à Rainha Louca - 2019

=== Short stories and crônicas ===
- Modo de Apanhar Pássaros à Mão - 2006
- A face serena - 2017
- Histórias nada sérias -2017
- "Toda palavra dá samba" - 2024. Biblioteca Nacional award

=== Children's and young adult books ===
- O Arqueólogo do Futuro - 2006
- O Problema do Pato - 2007
- No Risco do Caracol - 2008
- Conversa de Passarinhos – Haikais para crianças de todas as idades (com Alice Ruiz) - 2008
- Histórias daqui e d'acolá – 2009
- Hai-Quintal - Haicais descobertos no quintal – 2011,
- Ouro Dentro da Cabeça - 2012
- Jardim de Menino Poeta - 2012
- Vampiros e outros sustos - 2013
- Uma Aventura Animal - 2013
