= Spilt Milk (novel) =

Book by Chico Buarque

- Title page for Leite Derramado Portuguese language original edition (2009)
- Author: Chico Buarque
- Original title: Leite Derramado
- Translator: Alison Entrekin
- Language: Portuguese
- Publisher: Companhia das Letras
- Publication date: 2009
- Publication place: Brazil
- English publication date: 2012
- Pages: 195

Spilt Milk (original title in Portuguese: Leite Derramado) is a novel written by Chico Buarque.

== Synopsis ==
A very old man is in a hospital bed. A member of a traditional Brazilian family, he presents the history of his family in a monologue addressed to his daughter, the nurses, and anyone else who will listen. He follows his family's path from his Portuguese ancestors, including a baron of the Empire, and a First Republic's Senator, down to his grandson, a youth from Rio de Janeiro. His family saga is characterized by social and economic decadence against the background of Brazilian history over the last two centuries.

== Awards and Recognitions ==
- Voted best book of 2009 by readers of O Globo.
- 2010 São Paulo Prize for Literature — Shortlisted in the Best Book of the Year category

== Editions ==
Brazilian edition

- Leite Derramado, São Paulo, SP: Companhia das Letras, 2009. ISBN 978-8-5359-1411-5

Translations

- English translation by Alison Entrekin, Spilt Milk, New York, NY: Grove Press, 2012. ISBN 978-0-8021-2008-3
- French translation by Geneviève Leibrich, Quand je sortirai d'ici, Paris: Gallimard, 2011. ISBN 978-2-07-012817-4
- German translation by Karin von Schweder-Schreiner, Vergossene Milch, Frankfurt am Main: S. Fischer, 2013. ISBN 978-3-10-046331-9
- Hebrew translation by Erela Talenberg Lerer, חלב שנשפך, Israel, Xargol Books, Ltd., 2017 ISBN 978-965-560-033-9
- Italian translation by Roberto Francavilla, Latte versato, Milano: Feltrinelli, 2010. ISBN 978-8-80-701803-9
- Spanish translation by Ana Rita da Costa García, Leche derramada, Barcelona: Salamandra, 2010. ISBN 978-8-49-838340-9
