= Luiz Antonio de Assis Brasil =

Brazilian writer and university professor

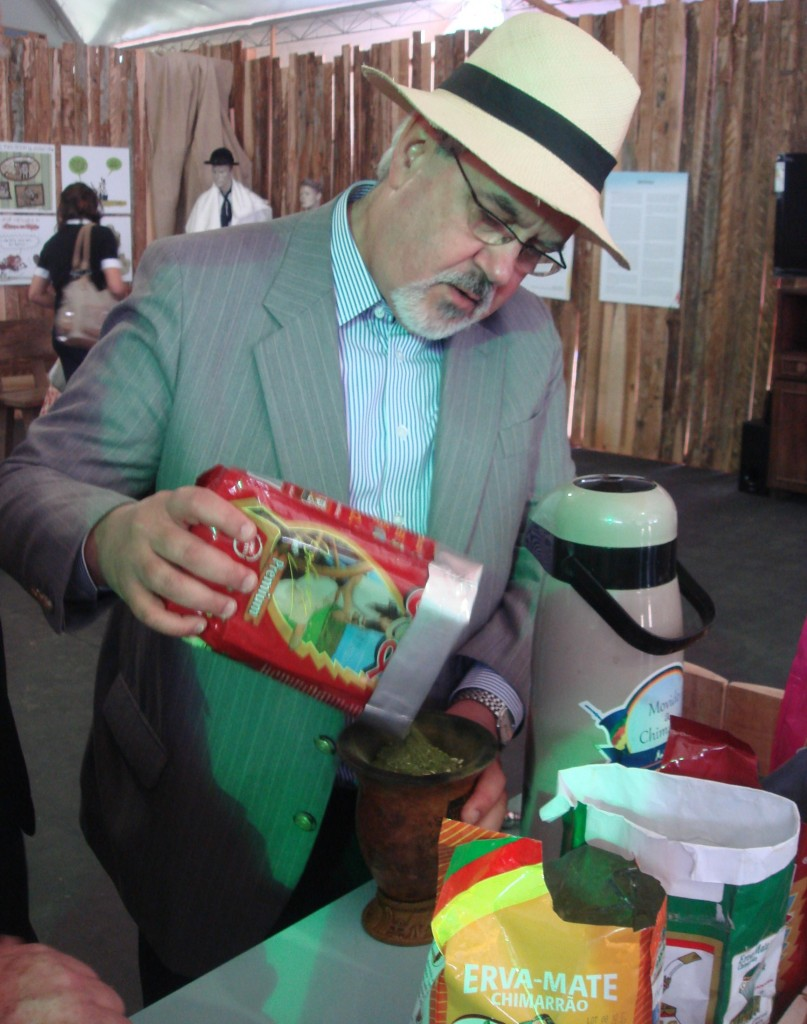
Luiz Antonio de Assis Brasil

Luiz Antonio de Assis Brasil (born 1945 in Porto Alegre) is a Brazilian writer and university professor.

Author of 22 books, most of them historical novels set in Rio Grande do Sul, he divides his time between writing and teaching in the master's and doctoral programs in Literature and Creative Writing at the Pontifical Catholic University of Rio Grande do Sul and at the same university's Literary Creation Workshop.

== Literary workshop ==
Founded in 1985, it is the oldest and most award-winning literary workshop in Brazil, among their alumni are writers such as Amílcar Bettega Barbosa, Letícia Wierzchowski, Cíntia Moscovich, Daniel Pellizzari, Michel Laub, Monique Revillion, and Daniel Galera, among dozens of others.

== Books ==
=== Fiction ===
- Um quarto de légua em quadro (1976)
- A prole do corvo (1978)
- Bacia das almas (1981)
- Manhã transfigurada (1982)
- As virtudes da casa (1985)
- O homem amoroso (1986)
- Cães da província (1987)
- Videiras de cristal (1990)
- Perversas famílias (1992)
- Pedra da memória (1993)
- Os senhores do século (1994)
- Concerto campestre (1997)
- Anais da Província-Boi (1997)
- Breviário das terras do Brasil (1997)
- O pintor de retratos (2001)
- A margem imóvel do rio (2003)
- Música perdida (2006)
- Figura na sombra (2012)
- O inverno e depois (2016)
- Leopold (2023)

=== Non-fiction ===
- Ensaios íntimos e imperfeitos (2008)
- Escrever ficção (2019)

=== As organizer ===
- 2014 - Melhor não abrir essa gaveta
- 2018 - Caleidoscópio
