= Rodrigo Lacerda =

Brazilian writer

Rodrigo Lacerda (born 1969) is a Brazilian writer. He was born in Rio de Janeiro. He has a PhD in literature from the University of São Paulo.

== Works ==
Lacerda is known for his works in several genres. Notable works include:

- O mistério do leão rampante (novel, 1995, Jabuti Prize)
- A dinâmica das larvas (novel, 1996)
- Tripod (short stories, 1999)
- Vista do Rio (novel, 2004)
- O Fazedor de Velhos (young adult, 2008)
- Outra Vida (novel, 2009)
- A República das Aves (novel, 2013)
- Hamlet or Amleto? (young adult, 2015)
- Todo dia é dia de apocalipse (young adult, 2016)
- Reserva Natural (short stories, 2018)

He is a multiple winner of the Jabuti Prize.
