= Edgard Telles Ribeiro =

Brazilian diplomat and writer (born 1944)

Edgard Telles Ribeiro (born 1944) is a Brazilian writer and diplomat. He was born in Valparaiso, Chile, into a diplomatic household and thus had a peripatetic childhood, mostly in Europe. He studied film at UCLA. He has written more than a dozen books of fiction, among which several have been translated into English:

- As If By Magic
- His Own Man
- I Would Have Loved Him If I Had Not Killed Him
- The Impostor

His most recent book Jogo de armar was nominated for the Premio Jabuti.

On 11 December 2024, he was elected to occupy Chair number 27 at the Brazilian Academy of Letters, in succession to Antonio Cicero.
