= João Gilberto Noll =

Brazilian writer

- Born: April 15, 1946; Porto Alegre, Brazil
- Died: March 29, 2017 (aged 70); Porto Alegre, Brazil
- Education: PUC-Rio
- Writing career
- Notable works: O cego e a dançarina Hotel Atlântico
- Website: joaogilbertonoll.com.br

João Gilberto Noll (April 15, 1946 – March 29, 2017) was a Brazilian writer, born in Porto Alegre, in the southern Brazilian state of Rio Grande do Sul.

== Early life ==
His early years were spent studying at the Catholic Colégio São Pedro. In 1967 he began university coursework in literature at the UFRGS (Federal University of Rio Grande do Sul), but in 1969 interrupted his studies to pursue a career as a journalist in Rio de Janeiro, working for the newspapers Folha da Manhã and Última Hora. In 1970, Noll spent a year in São Paulo working as a copy editor at the publishing house Editora Nacional, but a year later moved back to Rio and resumed both his work in journalism at Última Hora—writing on literature, theater and music—and his university studies in literature, first at the Faculdade Notre Dame and then at the PUC-Rio, where he received his degree in 1979.

== Career ==
Noll published his first short story as part of a 1970 Porto Alegre anthology titled Roda de Fogo, but his more formal literary debut came in 1980 when his first book of short stories O cego e a dançarina (English title: The blind man and the dancer) was released, for which he received three literary prizes. One of Noll's short stories from O cego e a dançarina, "Alguma coisa urgentemente" ("Something urgent"), was the basis for the film Nunca fomos tão felizes (English title: We've Never Been So Happy) in 1983, directed by Murilo Salles and starring actor Claudio Marzo.

Noll received early international attention as a participant in the Writer's Program at the University of Iowa in 1982, and when his work appeared in an anthology of new Brazilian writers published in Germany in 1983. After a short visit to the University of California, Berkeley in 1996, he was invited to teach Brazilian literature there in 1997. He was an invited scholar for a Rockefeller Foundation seminar in Bellagio, Italy, was the recipient of a Guggenheim Fellowship in 2002, and spent a two-month writing residency at the Centre for the Study of Brazilian Culture & Society at King's College London in 2004. All of these experiences were to shape the subject matter of later works.

His first collection of stories was followed by the novels A fúria do corpo (1981), Bandoleiros (1985) and Rastros do Verão (1986). Two of his subsequent and perhaps best-known works, the novels Hotel Atlântico (1989) and Harmada (1993), later came out in a 1997 English edition, translated by David Treece and published by Boulevard Books in London. Another novel, titled O quieto animal da esquina, appeared in 1991.

From 1998 to 2001 Noll published a twice-weekly series of short stories in the major São Paulo daily Folha de S.Paulo, and in 2004 he began to publish longer stories every two weeks in the daily Correio Braziliense, published in the federal capital, Brasília.

His most recent works include the novels A céu aberto (1996), Canoas e Marolas (1999), Berkeley em Bellagio (2002), Lorde (2004), and Acenos e afagos (2008), as well as the collections of short stories Mínimos múltiplos comuns (2003) and A máquina de ser (2006).

Noll died on March 29, 2017, in Porto Alegre.

== Awards and recognitions ==
- 2009 São Paulo Prize for Literature shortlisting in the Best Book of the Year category of Acenos e Afagos
