= Alberto Mussa =

Brazilian writer and translator

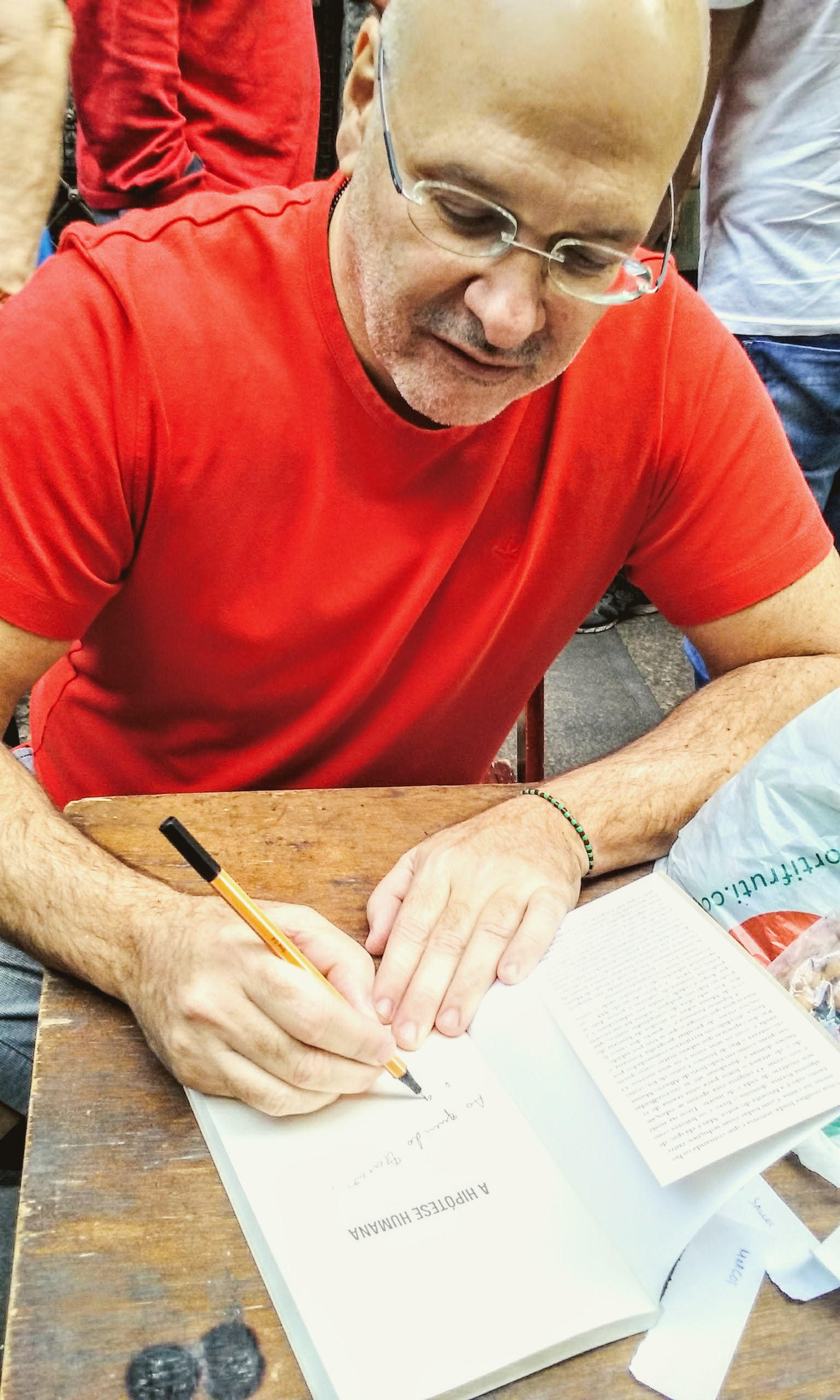
- Born: 1961; Rio de Janeiro
- Occupations: Writer, journalist
- Website: www.albertomussa.com

Alberto Mussa (born 28 June 1961) is a Brazilian novelist and translator.

== Life and career ==
Mussa was born in Rio de Janeiro, in a family of Indigenous and Lebanese descent. He first studied mathematics, then graduated in Languages at the Federal University of Rio de Janeiro.

His writings fuse Western narrative tradition with mythological accounts from other cultures, such as Afro-Brazilian, pre-Islamic Arabian and indigenous Brazil. His works have been published in 17 countries and 15 languages, such as Argentina, Cuba, Portugal, Italy, France, England, Romania, Turkey, Spain and Egypt, and were awarded prizes such as the Premio Casa de Las Americas, the Prêmio Machado de Assis and the Prêmio APCA.

Together with historian Luiz Antonio Simas, he wrote Samba de enredo: história e arte, a study about the aesthetic evolution of samba-enredo. He translated pre-islamic poems, recollected in the book Os poemas suspensos.

=== Compêndio Mítico ===
Mussa is the author of Compêndio Mítico do Rio de Janeiro [Rio de Janeiro's Mythical Compendium] a series of five crime novels, each one set in a different century and aiming to portrait the history of Rio through reports of actual or fictional crimes.

== Published works ==
=== Novels ===
- 1999 - O trono da rainha Jinga (Compêndio Mítico do Rio de Janeiro #1)
- 2004 - O enigma de Qaf
- 2006 - O movimento pendular
- 2011 - O senhor do lado esquerdo (Compêndio Mítico do Rio de Janeiro #2)
  - English translation:The Mystery of Rio; transl. Alex Ladd. Europa Editions, 2013. ISBN 978-1-60945-136-3
- 2014 - A Primeira História do Mundo (Compêndio Mítico do Rio de Janeiro #3)
- 2017 - A hipótese humana (Compêndio Mítico do Rio de Janeiro #4)
- 2018 - A biblioteca elementar (Compêndio Mítico do Rio de Janeiro #5)

=== Short stories ===
- 1997 - Elegbara - (Editora Revan:new edition: Editora Record, 2005, Rio de Janeiro)
- 2016 - Os contos completos

=== Organizer ===
- 2013 - Altas Universal do Conto (with Stéphane Chao)

=== Translation ===
- 2006 - Os poemas suspensos -Pre-Islamic Arabic poetry

=== Non-fiction ===
- 2009 - Meu destino é ser onça
- 2010 - Samba de enredo: história e arte (with Luiz Antônio Simas)
