= Companhia das Letras =

Brazilian publishing company

- Parent company: Penguin Random House (70%); Luis Schwarcz and Lilia Moritz Schwarcz (30%)
- Founded: 1986
- Founder: Luiz Schwarcz and Lilia Moritz Schwarcz
- Country of origin: Brazil
- Headquarters location: São Paulo
- Key people: Luiz Schwarcz (CEO/chairman); Lilia Moritz Schwarcz (COO/board member)
- Publication types: Books
- Nonfiction topics: Brazil Publisher
- Revenue: R$ 196 million (2009)
- Official website: www.companhiadasletras.com.br

Companhia das Letras is the largest publishing house in São Paulo, Brazil. It was founded in 1986 by Luiz Schwarcz and his wife, Lilia Moritz Schwarcz.

Companhia das Letras began as a literary publishing house and gradually grew into 17 independent publishing units with a broad readership of all ages and industries.

== History ==
In an interview with The Guardian, Luis Schwarcz said he knew Brazil lacked quality publishing houses after working eight years in the publishing industry at Editora Brasiliense. In 1986, recognizing the opportunity, he and his wife, Lilia Moritz, established a publishing house that combined literary, commercial, and progressive marketing techniques.

One of the publisher's first four titles, Edmund Wilson's To the Finland Station, had never been published in Brazil, despite having been published in English 40 years before. Their Portuguese version sold more copies in Brazil than the English edition sold in the United States. Consequently, Companhia das Letras gained in reputation and signed a well-known Brazilian contemporary writer, Rubem Fonseca. In its first year, Companhia das Letras published 48 different titles. In 1989, businessman, writer and economist Fernando Moreira Salles became a partner of Companhia das Letras.

In 2010, the Penguin Companhia label began to publish Portuguese translations from the Penguin Classics catalogue, with the internationally recognized Penguin format, as well as a series of classics in Portuguese and new projects designed especially for the collection. In December 2011, Penguin bought 45% of the company. Following the sale to Penguin, Companhia das Letras expanded its publishing genres and created more brands. Luis Schwarcz said the transaction "gave us great learning opportunities and the ability to share their experience with fellow publishers worldwide".

In 2015, the company bought Editora Objetiva, which was previously owned by Grupo Santillana / PRISA.

In 2015, Nielsen BookScan determined "Companhia das Letras is the second largest book publisher with an 8.08% market share in Brazil." In 2017, BookScan listed Companhia das Letras as "the largest book publisher with over 5,000 titles and 34 Nobel Prize winners".

In 2017, Luiz Schwarcz won the London Book Fair's Lifetime Achievement Award. David Roche, a London Book Fair Advisory Group member, said, "Luiz is one of the world's leading publishers, and his name could be said to represent the Brazilian publishing industry".

In 2018, Penguin Random House increased its stake in the publisher to 70%, leaving the Schwarcz family with a 30% minority stake.

On October 2, 2019, the company bought publishing house Zahar of Rio de Janeiro.

On March 18, 2022, Companhia das Letras announced the purchase of 70% of Editora JBC, aiming to support the distribution, commercialization and promotion of JBC manga. Management remained in the hands of the Shoji sisters due to their experience with the manga and licensing area, and the purchase was announced in the week that Editora JBC celebrated its 27th anniversary.

== Main Genres ==
Companhia has focused on literature and social sciences since its establishment. The company covers subgenres such as Brazilian fiction, foreign language and original fiction, poetry, detective and thriller novels, literary criticism, historical works, political science, biographies, memoirs, travel reports, anthropology, philosophy, and psychology.

According to the publisher's 2015 survey of the favourite books and authors of all age groups, foreign works are among the most popular, but more than half of them still come from Brazil. Furthermore, the publisher created two new sub-brands to differentiate commercial books and purely literary works: Paralela, a commercial book brand, and Seguinte, a young adult book brand.

== Published Authors ==
The list of the publisher's authors includes 12 Nobel Prize-winning writers, including the famous American poet Elizabeth Bishop, the American experimental psychologist Steven Pinker, Doris Lessing, and José Saramago.

Other authors in the catalog include:

- Jorge Luis Borges (Argentina)
- Jorge Amado (Brazil)
- José Saramago (Portugal)
- Vinicius de Moraes (Brazil)
- Chico Buarque (Brazilian singer)
- Machado de Assis (Brazil)
- Luis Verissimo (Brazil)
- Harold Bloom (USA)
- Philip Roth (USA)
- Feodor Dostoevsky (Russia)
- Roberto Bolaño (Chile - Spain)
- Dr. Seuss (United States)
- Caetano Veloso (Brazilian singer)
- Alejo Carpentier (Cuba, creator of magical realism)
- Dav Pilkey (USA; was signed to Cosac Naify before 2015, when that publisher closed)
- William Steig (USA)
- Shel Silverstein (USA)
- Jostein Gaarder (Norway)

== Crisis ==
In the ten years between 1995 and 2005, the Brazilian publishing industry declined, with book sales falling nearly 23% cumulatively at a 2.7% average annual decline. A Brazilian Publishing Association survey found only 1/3 of the educated population reads more than one book a year, with adult readers account for only 33% of all sales. After a series of government stimulus policies from 2006 onwards, the Brazilian publishing industry gradually recovered and grew.

On October 30, 2004, Brazil enacted its first federal book law. It is an essential milestone in the development of the publishing industry in Brazil, as books are recognized by law as an "irreplaceable medium for the dissemination of culture and the transmission of knowledge". On December 22, 2004, the government legislated a complete tax exemption for book publishing.

After announcing the closure of 20 bookstores in October 2018, Brazil's largest bookstore chain, Saraiva, announced late last month that it was filing for bankruptcy protection due to debts totaling more than $160 million. Cultura, another major bookstore chain, also announced a restructuring plan this fall to avoid bankruptcy, and together they have more than 100 bookstores in Brazil, accounting for 40 percent of the country's bookselling market.

The downturn in the book market has affected publishers in the upper reaches of the industry. In August, Editora Abril, one of Brazil's largest publishing houses, announced a massive layoff plan, with 10 of its magazines ceasing publication and some 550 employees, including some 150 journalists, being laid off. Writers' lives have also been affected.

In his blog, Cartas de Amor aos livros (Love Letters to Books), Luiz Schwarcz, wrote: "It's impossible to predict how big the impact of this crisis will be, but it's frightening enough ... Many towns will not have a single bookstore left, and publishers are now facing the challenge of getting their books to consumers and having to deal with losses that have accumulated over time".

The difficult situation for bookstores and publishers is not a new problem. Earlier this year, a survey done by the Brazilian Book Council showed that the Brazilian publishing market has continued to decline over the past three years, having fallen by a cumulative 22 percent since 2015. Between 2016 and 2017, book sales fell by 30 million copies.

In response to the immediate crisis, Schwarcz said he has fired six employees and said it was "one of the most painful moments in his personal and professional life." Schwarcz's company has been trying innovative alternatives to overcome the current crisis. They have launched a phone and mail service called "Socorro, Companhia" to make it easier for readers to find books; in addition, the company has set up a sales team to provide door-to-door service. For instance, calling on other publishers, booksellers, and authors to join Com in "finding creative and idealistic solutions".

"If you share my passion for books, I hope you will respond and share my call to urge others to pick up a few books this holiday season. Whether it's a work by your favourite author or a new one you've always wanted to try," Schwarcz writes in the article, "there are bookstores that have persevered in the face of adversity, and you can go there to pay tribute to them in a tangible way, or to help those that have fallen on hard times. Most importantly, many small, obscure publishers desperately need your support to deal with this existential crisis".

In response to Schwarcz's call, the hashtag "DêLivrosDePresente" (which means "books are gifts") quickly spread on Brazilian social media. Schwarcz told Publishing Perspectives that he found the response generous and surprising but also said, "Unfortunately, current politics is always about creating divided groups, and people are always against things rather than accepting them. So I try to create a good community, a loving community, or a community that loves books".

Companhia das Letras has launched a service to help consumers track book information via cell phone and email and has built a home delivery sales team.

Schwarcz's blog, which has received an overwhelming response on Brazilian social media, urges people to buy more books during the Christmas season to help bookstores weather the crisis.

== Adoption of Amazon Distribution ==
Brazil-based publisher Companhia das Letras has been an active seller since Amazon.com.br first entered the Brazilian market in 2012. In the same pioneering spirit, they were also an early adopter of Amazon's self-service advertising product immediately after the solution was first launched in Brazil in December 2020.

Currently, the brand invests approximately 30% of its advertising budget in Amazon advertising. To diversify its marketing mix and help further increase product awareness, Companhia das Letras' advertising budget is spread across multiple channels, such as natural and paid search, social media, physical bookstores, email marketing, and e-newsletters.

As one of the first sellers in Brazil to use Amazon advertising, the company had no prior experience with the solution. But from explaining webinars to online video tutorials, Companhia das Letras has used Amazon Advertising's online resources to improve its campaigns and identify critical business dates, using a solid strategy to be well prepared. With the support of Amazon Advertising, the publisher had an impressive first quarter. Companhia das Letras' familiarity with advertising solutions helped them diversify their campaign strategies and use on-demand advertising analytics for ongoing optimization. This strategic campaign management has resulted in an advertising input-to-output ratio (ACOS)1 of about 20%, a figure the publisher calls "quite satisfactory".

Overall, collaboration through Amazon Ad Execution has helped achieve the following goals.

- Companhia das Letras achieved triple-digit growth in early 2021.2

- The ripple effect of success observed outside of Amazon, combined with the now successful advertising campaign, also helped increase sales in the physical bookstore.

- Since December 2020, there have been more than 19,000 new exclusive customers.

"Amazon advertising has enabled us to reach a wider audience. In addition, it has allowed us to run both merchandising and branding campaigns." Castro says. By exploring different techniques and experimenting with alternative budgets, our ability to test and learn has helped our valued readers find their ideal book.—Kyara Castro, Marketing Analyst, Companhia das Letras

Luiz Schwarcz, the founder of Companhia das Letras, has felt the tremendous changes in the global publishing world over the last thirty years and "the world to see Brazilian writers. Nowadays, the demand for reading is growing all over the world, and copyright deals play a crucial role in bridging cultures. As Luiz says: "We are using new ways to tell people that reading is a precious blanket to help them escape the hustle and bustle of the world.

== Recent cultural activities ==
Most recently, the company has been working on a campaign called "Books are immigrants" which is closely tied to current events in society. "It is a way to emphasize their appreciation and support of cultural exchange, and their hope that the exchange of cultures will become more frequent and of higher quality in Brazil". It has successfully continued this activity until now and retains its original beginnings.
