= São Paulo Prize for Literature =

- Location: São Paulo
- Country: Brazil
- First award: 2008
- Final award: 2023
- Website: www.premiosaopaulodeliteratura.org.br

The São Paulo Prize for Literature (Portuguese: Prêmio São Paulo de Literatura) is a Brazilian literary prize for novels written in the Portuguese language and published in Brazil. It was established in 2008 by the Secretary of Culture for the State of São Paulo. Though not as old as other literary prizes in Brazil, such as the Machado de Assis Prize, the São Paulo Prize has quickly risen in prestige. For example, in 2011, there were 221 submissions for the prize. This rapid rise in popularity is partly because of the large cash prize. Every year two prizes of R$200,000 each are awarded—one for the best novel of the year by an established author, and the other for the best novel of the year by a debut author—making the São Paulo Prize the largest prize for a published work in Brazil, and one of the largest literary prizes in the world. Ten finalists are listed for each award, during the Festival da Mantiqueira, and the winners are announced on the first Monday of August in the Museum of the Portuguese Language.

== Winners ==
The following is a list of the winners since the prize's beginning:

Year	Best Book of the Year		
Year	Author	Title	English Translation
2008	Cristóvão Tezza	O Filho Eterno	The Eternal Son
2009	Ronaldo Correia de Brito	Galiléia	n/a
2010	Raimundo Carrero	A minha alma é irmã de Deus	n/a
2011	Rubens Figueiredo	Passageiro do Fim do Dia	n/a
2012	Bartolomeu Campos de Queirós	Vermelho Amargo	n/a
2013	Daniel Galera	Barba ensopada de sangue	Blood-Drenched Beard
2014	Ana Luísa Escorel	Anel de vidro	n/a
2015	Estevão Azevedo	Tempo de espalhar pedras	n/a
2016	Beatriz Bracher	Anatomia do Paraíso	n/a
2017	Maria Valéria Rezende	Outros cantos	n/a
2018	Ana Paula Maia	Assim na terra como embaixo da terra	On Earth As It Is Beneath
2019	Ana Paula Maia	Enterre Seus Mortos	n/a
2020	Claudia Lage	O corpo interminável	n/a
2021	Edimilson de Almeida Pereira	Front	n/a
2022	Antônio Xerxenesky	Uma tristeza infinita	An Infinite Sadness
2023	Mariana Salomão Carrara	Não fossem as sílabas do sábado	n/a
2024	Luciany Aparecida	Mata Doce	n/a
2025	Mariana Salomão Carrara	A árvore mais sozinha do mundo	n/a

Year	Best Book of the Year – Debut Author		
Year	Author	Title	English Translation
2008	Tatiana Salem Levy	A Chave de Casa	The House in Smyrna
2009	Altair Martins	A Parede no Escuro	n/a
2010	Edney Silvestre	Se eu fechar os olhos agora	If I Close My Eyes Now
2011	Marcelo Ferroni	Método Prático da Guerrilha	n/a
2012	Suzana Montoro	Os Hungareses	n/a
*From 2013 to 2018 this prize was split to create separate categories for debut authors under and over 40*
2019	Tiago Ferro	O Pai da Menina Morta	n/a
2020	Marcelo Labes	Paraízo-Paraguay	n/a
2021	Morgana Kretzmann	Ao pó	n/a
2022	Rita Carelli	Terrapreta	n/a
2023	Alexandre Alliatti	Tinta branca	n/a
2024	Eliane Marques	Louças de Família	n/a
2025	Marcílio França Castro	O último dos copistas	n/a

Year	Best Book of the Year – Debut Author 40 and Under		
Year	Author	Title	English Translation
2013	Jacques Fux	Antiterapias	n/a
2014	Marcos Peres	O evangelho segundo Hitler	n/a
2015	Débora Laís Ferraz dos Santos	Enquanto Deus não está olhando	n/a
2016	Rafael Gallo	Rebentar	n/a
2017	Maurício de Almeida	A instrução da noite	n/a
2018	Aline Bei	O peso do pássaro morto	n/a

Year	Best Book of the Year – Debut Author Over 40		
Year	Author	Title	English Translation
2013	Paula Fábrio	Desnorteio	n/a
2014	Veronica Stigger	Opisanie Swiata	n/a
2015	Micheliny Verunschk	Nossa Teresa – Vida e morte de uma santa suicida	n/a
2016	Marcelo Maluf	A imensidão íntima dos carneiros	n/a
2017	Franklin Carvalho	Céus e terra	n/a
2018	Cristina Judar	Oito do sete	n/a

== Detailed Summary by Year ==
= winner.

=== 2008 São Paulo Prize for Literature ===
The initial jury for the inaugural year of the São Paulo Prize for Literature reviewed 146 novels submitted by 55 publishers and 19 independent authors. The initial jury selected five finalists for each category, after which the final jury selected one winner from each category. The awards ceremony took place on 1 December 2008, and the presenter was the MTV VJ Cazé Peçanha. All entries were first published in Brazil in 2007.

Shortlist for Best Book of the Year

- Cristóvão Tezza, O Filho Eterno (English translation: The Eternal Son), Rio de Janeiro, RJ: Editora Record, 2007. ISBN 9788501077882
- Beatriz Bracher, Antonio, São Paulo, SP: Editora 34, 2007. ISBN 9788573263770
- Bernardo Carvalho, O sol se põe em São Paulo, São Paulo, SP: Companhia das Letras, 2007. ISBN 9788535909777
- Menalton Braff, A muralha de Adriano, Rio de Janeiro, RJ: Bertrand Brasil, 2007. ISBN 9788528612738
- Wilson Bueno, A copista de Kafka, São Paulo, SP: Editora Planeta do Brasil, 2007. ISBN 9788576653134

Shortlist for Best Book of the Year – Debut Author

- Tatiana Salem Levy, A chave de casa, Rio de Janeiro, RJ: Editora Record, 2007. ISBN 9788501079275
- Cecilia Giannetti, Lugares que não conheço pessoas que nunca vi, Rio de Janeiro, RJ: Agir, 2007. ISBN 9788522006526
- Eduardo Baszczyn, Desamores, Rio de Janeiro, RJ: 7 Letras, 2007. ISBN 9788575773574
- Tiago Novaes, Estado vegetativo, São Paulo, SP: Callis, 2007. ISBN 9788574163154
- Wesley Peres, Casa entre vértebras, Rio de Janeiro, RJ: Editora Record, 2007. ISBN 9788501079428

Prize Administrators

- Board of Trustees: Virna Teixeira, Marcos Kirst, Marino Lobello, Frederico Barbosa, and Antonio Vicente Pietroforte
- Initial Jury: Ivana Arruda Leite, Marcia Elisa Garcia de Grandi, Marcia Tiburi, Paula Fábrio, Evandro Affonso Ferreira, Horácio Costa, Michel Sleiman, Cláudio Daniel, Julio Cesar Pimentel Pinto Filho, and Marcelino Freire
- Final Jury: Bernardo Ajzenberg, Fabio de Souza Andrade, Marisa Lajolo, José Castello, and Samuel Seibel

=== 2009 São Paulo Prize for Literature ===
The 2009 São Paulo Prize for Literature received 217 novels submissions by 75 publishers and 13 independent authors, (an increase of 48% over the previous year). From those submissions, the initial jury selected ten finalists for each category (an increase from five the previous year), which were announced on 30 May 2009, at the Second Festival da Mantiqueira. Included among the finalists was one book with two authors. All entries were first published in Brazil in 2008.

The winners selected by the final jury were announced on 3 August 2009 at a ceremony at the Museum of the Portuguese Language. The announcement was made by the Governor of São Paulo, José Serra, and the Secretary of Culture of the State of São Paulo, João Sayad. The ceremony was also attended by the Mayor of São Paulo city, Gilberto Kassab, São Paulo State Secretary of Education, Paulo Renato Souza, São Paulo State Secretary of Institutional Relations, José Henrique Reis Lobo, the Coordinator of the Unit for Promotion and Diffusion of Cultural Production of the SEC, André Sturm, and several prominent literary figures in addition to the 20 finalists.

Shortlist for Best Book of the Year

- Ronaldo Correia de Brito, Galiléia, Rio de Janeiro, RJ: Editora Objetiva, 2008. ISBN 9788560281589
- Carola Saavedra, Flores azuis, São Paulo, SP: Companhia das Letras, 2008. ISBN 9788535913040
- João Gilberto Noll, Acenos e Afagos, Rio de Janeiro, RJ: Editora Record, 2008. ISBN 9788501082091
- José Saramago, A Viagem do Elefante (English translation: The Elephant's Journey), São Paulo, SP: Companhia das Letras, 2008. ISBN 9788535913415
- Lívia Garcia-Roza, Milamor, Rio de Janeiro, RJ: Editora Record, 2008. ISBN 9788501084415
- Maria Esther Maciel, O Livro dos Nomes, São Paulo, SP: Companhia das Letras, 2008. ISBN 9788535911640
- Milton Hatoum, Órfãos do Eldorado (English translation: The Orphans of Eldorado), São Paulo, SP: Companhia das Letras, 2008. ISBN 9788535911671
- Moacyr Scliar, Manual da Paixão Solitária, São Paulo, SP: Companhia das Letras, 2008. ISBN 9788535913552
- Silviano Santiago, Heranças, Rio de Janeiro, RJ: Rocco, 2008. ISBN 9788532523525
- Walther Moreira Santos, O Ciclista, Belo Horizonte, MG: Autêntica, 2008. ISBN 9788575263471

Shortlist for Best Book of the Year – Debut Author

- Altair Martins, A Parede no Escuro, Rio de Janeiro, RJ: Editora Record, 2008. ISBN 9788501080554
- Contardo Calligaris, O Conto do Amor, São Paulo, SP: Companhia das Letras, 2008. ISBN 9788535912043
- Estevão Azevedo, Nunca o Nome do Menino, São Paulo, SP: Terceiro Nome, 2008. ISBN 9788578160289
- Francisco Azevedo, O Arroz De Palma, Rio de Janeiro, RJ: Editora Record, 2008. ISBN 9788501081940
- Javier Arancibia Contreras, Imóbile, Rio de Janeiro, RJ: 7 Letras, 2008. ISBN 9788575775493
- Marcus Freitas, Peixe Morto, Belo Horizonte, MG: Autêntica, 2008. ISBN 9788575263693
- Maria Cecília Gomes dos Reis, O Mundo Segundo Laura Ni, São Paulo, SP: Editora 34, 2008. ISBN 9788573264135
- Rinaldo Fernandes, Rita no Pomar, Rio de Janeiro, RJ: 7 Letras, 2008. ISBN 9788575775134
- Sérgio Guimarães, Zé, Mizé, Camarada André, Rio de Janeiro, RJ: Editora Record, 2008. ISBN 9788501082558
- Vanessa Barbara and Emilio Fraia, O Verão do Chibo, Rio de Janeiro, RJ: Objetiva, 2008. ISBN 9788560281510

Prize Administrators

- Board of Trustees: Antonio Dimas, Beth Brait, Julio Cesar Pimentel Pinto Filho, Manuel da Costa Pinto, and Marino Lobello (who also served on the board of trustees for the 2008 prize).
- Initial Jury: Ivan Marques (professor), Marcos Moraes (professor), Menalton Braff (author and a finalist for the 2008 prize), Fernando Paixão (author), Paula Fabrio (bookseller), José Carlos Honório (bookseller), Marcelo Pen (literary critic), Josélia Aguiar (literary critic), Márcia de Grandi (reader), and Mario Vitor Santos (reader).
- Final Jury: Cristóvão Tezza (author of the winning entry for the 2008 prize), Luis Antonio Giron (literary critic), Walnice Nogueira Galvão (professor), Aldo Bocchini (bookseller), and Claudiney Ferreira (reader).

=== 2010 São Paulo Prize for Literature ===
The list of ten finalists for each category chosen by the initial jury for the 2010 São Paulo Prize for Literature was officially announced at the Festival da Mantiqueira in São Francisco Xavier, São Paulo on 29 May 2010 by Governor Alberto Goldman. The finalists included Bernardo Carvalho, who made his second appearance, having previously made the list in 2008, and Ivana Arruda Leite, who had served on the initial jury for the 2008 prize.

There were originally 217 entries under consideration by the initial jury. All entries were first published in Brazil in 2009. The winners selected by the final jury were granted their awards by the Secretary of Culture of the State of São Paulo, Andrea Matarazzo, on behalf of the Governor of São Paulo, on 2 August 2010 at a ceremony at the Museum of the Portuguese Language.

Shortlist for Best Book of the Year

- Raimundo Carrero, A Minha Alma É Irmã de Deus, Rio de Janeiro, RJ: Editora Record, 2009. ISBN 9788501086648
- Bernardo Carvalho, O Filho da Mãe, São Paulo, SP: Companhia das Letras, 2009. ISBN 9788535913965
- Chico Buarque, Leite Derramado (English title: Spilt Milk), São Paulo, SP: Companhia das Letras, 2009. ISBN 9788535914115
- João Ubaldo Ribeiro, O Albatroz Azul, Rio de Janeiro, RJ: Nova Fronteira, 2009. ISBN 9788520923863
- Luiz Ruffato, Estive em Lisboa e Lembrei de Você, São Paulo, SP: Companhia das Letras, 2009. ISBN 9788535915259
- Ondjaki, AvóDezanove e o Segredo do Soviético (English title: Granma Nineteen and the Soviet's Secret), São Paulo, SP: Companhia das Letras, 2009. ISBN 9788535914702
- Paulo Rodrigues, As Vozes do Sótão, São Paulo, SP: Cosac Naify, 2009. ISBN 9788575038338
- Reinaldo Moraes, Pornopopeia, Rio de Janeiro, RJ: Editora Objetiva, 2008. ISBN 9788573029444
- Ricardo Lísias, O Livro dos Mandarins, Rio de Janeiro, RJ: Alfaguara, 2009. ISBN 9788560281978
- Rodrigo Lacerda, Outra Vida, Rio de Janeiro, RJ: Alfaguara, 2009. ISBN 9788560281855

Shortlist for Best Book of the Year – Debut Author

- Edney Silvestre, Se Eu Fechar os Olhos Agora (English title: If I Close My Eyes Now), Rio de Janeiro, RJ: Editora Record, 2009. ISBN 9788501088109
- Brisa Paim Duarte, A morte de Paula D., Maceió, AL: EDUFAL: Faculdade de Letras, Universidade Federal de Alagoas, 2009. ISBN 9788571774537
- Carlos de Brito e Mello, A Passagem Tensa dos Corpos, São Paulo, SP: Companhia das Letras, 2009. ISBN 9788535915730
- Carol Bensimon, Sinuca Embaixo D'Água, São Paulo, SP: Companhia das Letras, 2009. ISBN 9788535915143
- Cíntia Lacroix, Sanga Menor, Porto Alegre, RS: Dublinense, 2009. ISBN 9788562757020
- Claudia Lage, Mundos de Eufrásia, Rio de Janeiro, RJ: Editora Record, 2009. ISBN 9788501083357
- Ivana Arruda Leite, Hotel Novo Mundo, São Paulo, SP: Editora 34, 2009. ISBN 9788573264227
- Ivone Castilho Benedetti, Immaculada, São Paulo, SP: WMF Martins Fontes, 2009. ISBN 9788578271398
- Lívia Sganzerla Jappe, Cisão, Rio de Janeiro, RJ: 7 Letras, 2009. ISBN 9788575776124
- Maria Carolina Maia, Ciranda de Nós, São Paulo, SP: Grua Livros, 2009. ISBN 9788561578091

Prize Administrators

- Board of Trustees:
- Initial Jury: Egle Amato, Estevão Azevedo (author and finalist for the 2009 debut-author prize), Javier Arancibia Contreras (author and finalist for the 2009 debut-author prize), João Luís Ceccantini, Josélia Aguiar (literary critic and member of the 2009 initial jury), Cida Saldanha, Norma Ferreira, Ricardo Daumas, Rinaldo Gama, and Rosemary Conceição dos Santos.
- Final Jury: Walther Moreira Santos (a finalist for the 2009 prize), Luiz Felipe Pondé, Moacyr Scliar (a finalist for the 2009 prize), Plínio Martins, and Valentim Facioli.

=== 2011 São Paulo Prize for Literature ===
The initial jury for the 2011 São Paulo Prize for Literature reviewed 221 novels—104 for the primary prize and 117 for the debut author prize. The list of ten finalists for each category was officially announced at the 4th Festival da Mantiqueira in São Francisco Xavier on 28 May 2011. Included among the finalists were Evandro Affonso Ferreira, who had been on the initial jury for the 2008 prize, Menalton Braff, who had been a finalist for the 2008 prize and on the initial jury for the 2009 prize, and Carola Saavedra, who had been a finalist in 2009. The winners selected by the final jury were announced on 1 August 2011 at a ceremony at the Museum of the Portuguese Language. All entries were first published in Brazil in 2010.

Shortlist for Best Book of the Year

- Rubens Figueiredo, Passageiro do Fim do Dia, São Paulo, SP: Companhia das Letras, 2010. ISBN 9788535917604
- Adriana Lisboa, Azul-corvo, Rio de Janeiro, RJ: Rocco, 2010. ISBN 9788532525987
- Carola Saavedra, Paisagem com Dromedário, São Paulo, SP: Companhia das Letras, 2010. ISBN 9788535916386
- Evandro Affonso Ferreira, Minha Mãe se Matou sem Dizer Adeus, Rio de Janeiro, RJ: Editora Record, 2010. ISBN 9788501090935.
- Joca Reiners Terron, Do Fundo do Poço se Vê a Lua, São Paulo, SP: Companhia das Letras, 2010. ISBN 9788535916522
- Menalton Braff, Bolero de Ravel, São Paulo, SP: Global, 2010. ISBN 9788526015142
- Miguel Sanches Neto, Chá das Cinco com o Vampiro, Rio de Janeiro, RJ: Editora Objetiva, 2010. ISBN 9788539000463
- Nelson de Oliveira, Poeira: Demônios e Maldições, Rio de Janeiro, RJ: Língua Geral, 2010. ISBN 9788560160396
- Ronaldo Wrobel, Traduzindo Hannah, Rio de Janeiro, RJ: Editora Record, 2010. ISBN 9788501091147
- Sérgio Mudado, Os Negócios Extraordinários de um certo Juca PeraltaBelo Horizonte, MG: Crisálida, 2010. ISBN 9788587961624

Shortlist for Best Book of the Year – Debut Author

- Marcelo Ferroni, Método Prático da Guerrilha, São Paulo, SP: Companhia das Letras, 2010. ISBN 9788535917482
- Andréa del Fuego, Os Malaquias, Rio de Janeiro, RJ: Língua Geral, 2010. ISBN 9788560160501
- Bráulio Mantovani, Perácio – Relato Psicótico, São Paulo, SP: Leya, 2010. ISBN 9788580440218
- Eduardo Giannetti, A Ilusão da Alma: Biografia de uma Ideia Fixa, São Paulo, SP: Companhia das Letras, 2010. ISBN 9788535917055
- Gabriela Guimarães Gazzinelli, Prosa de Papagaio, Rio de Janeiro, RJ: Editora Record, 2010. ISBN 9788501090973
- Hélio Pólvora, Inúteis Luas Obscenas, São Paulo, SP: Casarão do Verbo, 2010. ISBN 9788561878016
- Luis Alberto Brandão, Manhã do Brasil, São Paulo, SP: Scipione, 2010. ISBN 9788526278523
- Marcelo Cid, Os Unicórnios, Rio de Janeiro, RJ: 7 Letras, 2010. ISBN 9788575776377
- Marco Lucchesi, O Dom do Crime, Rio de Janeiro, RJ: Editora Record, 2010. ISBN 9788501091680
- Reni Adriano, Lugar, Rio de Janeiro, RJ: Tinta Negra, 2010. ISBN 9788563114051

Prize Administrators

- Board of Trustees:
- Initial Jury: Anna Maria Martins, Cibele Lopresti Costa, Donizete Galvão de Souza, Helena Bonito Couto Pereira, Luiz Avelino de Lima, Luiz Gonzaga Marchezan, Maria Antonia Pavan de Santa Cruz, Maria da Aparecida Saldanha, Mirna Queiroz dos Santos, and Rodrigo Vilella.
- Final Jury: Ignácio de Loyola Brandão, Alexandre Martins Fontes, Ruy Altenfelder, Regina Dalcastagnè, and Francisco Foot Hardman.

=== 2012 São Paulo Prize for Literature ===
The initial jury for the 2012 São Paulo Prize for Literature reviewed 209 novels, 90 of which came from established authors, and 119 of which came from debut authors. On 2 August 2012, the Secretary of Culture for the State of São Paulo announced the ten finalists for each category. Included among the finalists was the reappearance of Tatiana Salem Levy, who had won the 2008 São Paulo Prize for Literature for debut authors, Luiz Ruffato who had been a finalist for the 2010 main prize, and Hélio Pólvora who had been a finalist for the 2011 debut author prize. Bartolomeu Campos de Queirós died in January 2012, but was still made a finalist and allowed to compete posthumously. His novel ultimately won the prize. Bartolomeu Campos de Queirós was represented at the awards ceremony by his publisher, Isabel Coelho, who accepted the prize on his behalf and stated the prize money would go to his family. The winners selected by the final jury were announced by Governor Geraldo Alckmin on 24 September 2012 at the Museum of the Portuguese Language. All entries were first published in Brazil in 2011.

Shortlist for Best Book of the Year

- Bartolomeu Campos de Queirós, Vermelho Amargo, São Paulo, SP: Cosac Naify, 2011. ISBN 9788575039625
- Adriana Lunardi, A Vendedora de Fósforos, Rio de Janeiro, RJ: Rocco, 2011. ISBN 9788532526885
- Domingos Pellegrini, Herança de Maria, São Paulo, SP: Leya, 2011. ISBN 9788580440942
- Hélio Pólvora, Don Solidon, Casarão do Verbo, 2011. ISBN 9788561878115
- Luiz Ruffato, Domingos sem Deus, Rio de Janeiro, RJ: Editora Record, 2011. ISBN 9788501075123
- Luiz Vilela, Perdição, Rio de Janeiro, RJ: Editora Record, 2011. ISBN 9788501095244
- Michel Laub, Diário da Queda, São Paulo, SP: Companhia das Letras, 2011. ISBN 9788535918175
- Paulo Scott, Habitante Irreal, Rio de Janeiro, RJ: Alfaguara, 2011. ISBN 9788579621079
- Silvio Lancellotti, Em Nome do Pai dos Burros, São Paulo, SP: Global, 2011. ISBN 9788526015913
- Tatiana Salem Levy, Dois Rios, Rio de Janeiro, RJ: Editora Record, 2011. ISBN 9788501096197

Shortlist for Best Book of the Year – Debut Author

- Suzana Montoro, Os Hungareses, São Paulo, SP: Ofício da Palavra, 2011. ISBN 9788560728282
- Ana Mariano, Atado de Ervas, Porto Alegre, RS: L&PM, 2011. ISBN 9788525424570
- Bernardo Kucinski, K. (English translation: K), São Paulo, SP: Expressão Popular, 2011. ISBN 9788577431892
- Chico Lopes, O Estranho no Corredor, São Paulo, SP: Editora 34, 2011. ISBN 9788573264777
- Edmar Monteiro Filho, Fita Azul, São Paulo, SP: Babel, 2011. ISBN 9788581111544
- Eliane Brum, Uma Duas, São Paulo, SP: Leya, 2011. ISBN 9788580441239
- Julián Fuks, Procura do Romance, Rio de Janeiro, RJ: Editora Record, 2011. ISBN 9788501094742
- Luciana Hidalgo, O Passeador, Rio de Janeiro, RJ: Rocco, 2011. ISBN 9788532527158
- Marcos Bagno, As Memórias de Eugênia, Curitiba, PR: Editora Positivo, 2011. ISBN 9788538548744
- Susana Fuentes, Luzia, Rio de Janeiro, RJ: 7 Letras, 2011. ISBN 9788575779187

Prize Administrators

- Board of Trustees: José Renato Nalini (secretary-general of the São Paulo Academy of Letters), Joaquim Maria Botelho (author and journalist), José Castilho Marques Neto (president of the UNESP Foundation Press and president of the Brazilian Association of University Publishers), Marisa Lajolo (professor, author, and member of the 2008 final jury), and Márcia Elisa Grandi (librarian).
- Initial Jury: Marcos Antonio de Moraes (professor of literature at USP), Francisco Foot Hardman (professor of literature at Unicamp and member of the final jury for the 2011 prize), Maria da Aparecida Saldanha (professor of literature at USP and member of the initial jury for the 2011 prize), Margaret Alves Antunes (librarian), Luis Avelino de Lima (author), Ricardo de Medeiros Ramos Filho (author), Egle Rita Amato (bookseller), Maria Zilda da Cunha (bookseller), Vitor Tavares da Silva Filho (bookseller), and Manuel da Costa Pinto (literary critic and member of the board of trustees for the 2009 prize).
- Final Jury: Helena Bonito Couto Pereira (professor and member of the 2011 initial jury), Fernando Augusto Magalhães Paixão (author, professor, and member of the 2009 initial jury), Lucio Claudio Zaccara (bookseller), Fábio Lucas Gomes (literary critic), and Djair Rodrigues de Souza (librarian).

=== 2013 São Paulo Prize for Literature ===
The window for submissions for the 2013 edition of the prize opened on 5 June 2013, along with a notification of a change to the prize structure. Under the new structure the 2013 prize for the best book of the year would remain at R$200,000, while the prize for the best book of the year by a debut author would be split, with R$100,000 being awarded for the best book by a debut author 40 and under and R$100,000 for the best book by a debut author over 40. An author who has previously published books in another genre is still considered a debut author if the book under consideration is his or her first novel.

Out of 187 entries, 168 were found eligible to be considered in the competition, of which 80 were by established authors, 38 were by debut authors aged 40 and under, and 50 were by debut authors over 40. The 20 finalists were then announced on Thursday, 10 October 2013, with four finalists in the Debut Authors 40 and Under category, six finalists in the Debut Authors Over 40 category, and ten finalists in the main category for the Best Book of the Year.

The winners were announced at the Museum of the Portuguese Language on 25 November 2013, however, Daniel Galera, the winner of the Best Book of the Year award and R$200,000 was unable to attend the ceremony because he was traveling for work. At the ceremony, Paula Fábrio, the winner of the Best Book of the Year by Debut Authors Over 40, commented on how this year's prize reflects a movement in the Brazilian market, with small publishing houses producing quality novels that are being missed by the larger publishers. Both novels by the winners of the debut author prizes were published by smaller publishers, with initial runs of only 500 copies each. Galera's novel by contrast was published by one of the largest publishers in the country, Companhia das Letras, which had previously published the winning novel in both the veteran author and debut author categories, and has always been represented by at least one of its novels on the shortlists for each year.

Shortlist for Best Book of the Year

- Daniel Galera, Barba ensopada de sangue, São Paulo, SP: Companhia das Letras, 2012. ISBN 9788535921878
- Elvira Maria Vigna Lehmann, O que deu para fazer em matéria de história de amor, São Paulo, SP: Companhia das Letras, 2012. ISBN 9788535920796
- Evandro Affonso Ferreira, O mendigo que sabia de cor os adágios de Erasmo Rotterdam, Rio de Janeiro, RJ: Record, 2012. ISBN 9788501096418
- Francisco J.C. Dantas, Caderno de ruminações, Rio de Janeiro, RJ: Objetiva, 2012. ISBN 9788579621338
- José Luiz Passos, O sonâmbulo amador, Rio de Janeiro, RJ: Objetiva, 2012. ISBN 9788579621635
- Miguel Sanches Neto, A máquina de madeira, São Paulo, SP: Companhia das Letras, 2012. ISBN 9788535921922
- Ricardo Lísias, O céu dos suicidas, Rio de Janeiro, RJ: Objetiva, 2012. ISBN 9788579621253
- Ronaldo Correia de Brito, Estive lá fora, Rio de Janeiro, RJ: Objetiva, 2012. ISBN 9788579621543
- Xico Sá, Big Jato, São Paulo, SP: Companhia das Letras, 2012. ISBN 9788535921816
- Zuenir Ventura, Sagrada família, Rio de Janeiro, RJ: Objetiva, 2012. ISBN 9788579621413

Shortlist for Best Book of the Year – Debut Authors Over 40

- Paula Fábrio, Desnorteio, São Paulo, SP: Patuá, 2012. ISBN 9788564308701
- Antonio Geraldo Figueiredo Ferreira, As visitas que hoje estamos, São Paulo, SP: Iluminuras, 2012. ISBN 9788573213768
- Luize Valente, O segredo do oratório, Rio de Janeiro, RJ: Record, 2012. ISBN 9788501098542
- Maria Silvia de Souza Camargo, Quando ia me esquecendo de você, Rio de Janeiro, RJ: 7 Letras, 2012. ISBN 9788575779866
- Roberto Schaan Ferreira, Por que os ponchos são negros?, Editora da Cidade, 2012. ISBN 9788565526050
- Rodrigo Fonseca Barbosa, O homem que não sabia contar histórias, Rio de Janeiro, RJ: Record, 2012. ISBN 9788501094124

Shortlist for Best Book of the Year – Debut Authors Under 40

- Jacques Fux, Antiterapias, Belo Horizonte, MG: Scriptum, 2012. ISBN 9788589044530
- Antônio Salvador, A condessa de Picaçurova, Prólogo, 2012. ISBN 9788599349731
- Luisa Dalla Valle Geisler, Quiçá, Rio de Janeiro, RJ: Record, 2012. ISBN 9788501099860
- Raphael Montes de Carvalho, Suicidas, São Paulo, SP: Benvirá, 2012. ISBN 9788564065574

Prize Administrators

- Board of Trustees: Lígia Fonseca Ferreira, Marcia Elisa Garcia de Grandi, Maria de Lourdes Ortiz Gandini Baldan, Marisa Philbert Lajolo, and Quartim de Moraes.
- Initial Jury: Ana Lúcia Trevisan, Gênese Andrade da Silva, José Roberto Barreto Lins Filho, Marco Antonio de Moraes, Maria da Aparecida Saldanha, Ricardo Ramos Filho, Sandra Regina Ferro Espilotro, Silvio Lancellotti, Sylvia Helena Telarolli de Almeida Leite e Vera Sá.
- Final Jury: Benjamin Abdala Junior, Cassiano Elek Machado, Margaret Alves Antunes, Ronaldo Cagiano Barbosa, and Ubiratan Brasil.

=== 2014 São Paulo Prize for Literature ===
Submissions for the 7th edition of the São Paulo Prize for Literature were accepted between 24 March 2014 and 7 May 2014, and on 15 May 2014, the board of trustees and the initial jury for the 2014 prize were announced. The group included university professors, librarians, publishers, authors, and a biologist.

On 19 August 2014, the names of the 20 finalists were announced. The finalists were chosen from 169 books that had been entered for consideration, of which 153 were accepted for the competition.

Shortlist for Best Book of the Year

- Ana Luisa Escorel, Anel de vidro, Ouro sobre azul, 2013.
- Adriana Lisboa, Hanói, Alfaguara/Objetiva, 2013.
- Alberto Martins, Lívia e o cemitério africano, Editora 34, 2013.
- Bernardo Carvalho, Reprodução, Companhia das Letras, 2013.
- Carlos de Brito e Mello, A cidade, o inquisidor e os ordinários, Companhia das Letras, 2013.
- Joca Reiners Terron, A tristeza extraordinária do leopardo-das-neves, Companhia das Letras, 2013.
- Marco Lucchesi, O bibliotecário do imperador, Globo Livros, 2013.
- Michel Laub, A maçã envenenada, Companhia das Letras, 2013.
- Rodrigo Lacerda, Carlos Lacerda – A República das abelhas, Companhia das Letras, 2013.
- Sérgio Rodrigues, O drible, Companhia das Letras, 2013.

Shortlist for Best Book of the Year – Debut Authors Over 40

- Verônica Stigger, Opisanie Swiata, Cosac Naify, 2013.
- Amilcar Bettega, Barreira, Companhia das Letras, 2013.
- Cadão Volpato, Pessoas que passam pelos sonhos, Cosac Naify, 2013.
- Marcelino Freire, Nossos ossos, Record, 2013.
- Flavio Cafiero, O frio aqui fora, Cosac Naify, 2013.
- João Anzanello Carrascoza, Aos 7 e aos 40, Cosac Naify, 2013.
- Rogerio Pereira, Na Escuridão, amanhã, Cosac Naify, 2013.

Shortlist for Best Book of the Year – Debut Authors Under 40

- Marcos Peres, O evangelho segundo Hitler, Record, 2013.
- Ieda Magri, Olhos de bicho, Rocco, 2013.
- Laura Erber, Esquilos de Pavlov, Alfaguara/Objetiva, 2013.

Prize Administrators

- Board of Trustees: Andrea Saad Hossne, José Castilho Marques Neto, Ligia Fonseca Ferreira, Márcia Elísa Garcia de Grandi, and Maria de Lourdes Ortiz Gandini Baldan
- Initial Jury: Jefferson Agostini Mello, Jiro Takahashi, Manuel da Costa Pinto, Margaret Alves Antunes, Maria Antonia Pavan de Santa Cruz, Maria Celeste de Souza, Mirhiane Mendes de Abreu, Paloma Vidal, Ricardo Ramos Filho, and Sandra Regina Ferro Espilotro.
- Final Jury: Carlo Carrenho, Ivan Marques, Maria Rita Palmeira, and Rubens Figueiredo

== See also ==
- List of literary awards
- Brazilian literature
