= Carol Bensimon =

Brazilian writer

Carol Bensimon (born August 22, 1982, in Porto Alegre) is a Brazilian writer.

Bensimon graduated in Advertising at UFRGS, later acquiring a master's degree in Literary Theory at PUC-RS and through an exchange, she studied also at Pantheon-Sorbonne University. Bensimon published short stories in magazines Ficções, Ficção de Polpa e Bravo!, as well as in the newspaper Zero Hora.

Her first book was Pó de parede (Não Editora, 2008), including three novellas.

In 2009, after receiving a literary creation scholarship by Funarte she wrote Sinuca embaixo d'água, published by Companhia das Letras. The book was a finalist of São Paulo Prize for Literature in category New Author and of Jabuti Award 2010 in the category Novel.

She was one of the authors included in the anthology Histórias Femininas, published in 2011 by publisher Scipione. The book included tales of contemporary authors such as Indigo, Cecília Giannetti and Andréa del Fuego.

Bensimon was selected in 2012 as one of 20 Best of Young Brazilian Writers by the British Granta Magazine, "which indicates the names that will build the map of Brazilian literature".

== Works ==
- Pó de parede (Não editora, 2008)
- Sinuca embaixo d'água (Companhia das Letras, 2009)
- Todos nós adorávamos caubóis (Companhia das Letras, 2013)
  - English translation: We All Loved Cowboys. (Transit Books, 2018)
- O clube dos jardineiros de fumaça (Companhia das Letras, 2017)
- Diorama (Companhia das Letras, 2022)
