= Braff =

Braff is a surname. Notable people with the surname include:

- Joshua Braff (born 1967), American fiction author, the older brother of actor Zach Braff
- Menalton Braff (born 1938), Brazilian author
- Ruby Braff (1927–2003), American jazz trumpeter and cornetist
- Zach Braff (born 1975), American actor and film director
