= Flavio Cafiero =

Brazilian writer

Flavio Cafiero (born 1971) is a Brazilian writer. He has written five books, including O frio aqui fora (2013) (It's cold out here). In 2013, he won the Off-Flip literature award in the short story category. He was also the 2021 winner of the Prêmio APCA Literature Award.

== Biography ==
Cafiero was born in the Leme neighbourhood of Rio de Janeiro but grew up in Leblon. He started working at a department store when he was 22. He was posted to Vitoria, then Sao Paulo. He abandoned his job as an executive at the retail chain to became a writer in his mid-thirties and moved to São Paulo, where he joined in Noemi Jaffe's creative writing course.

In 2013, he won the Off-Flip literature award in the short story category. His semi-autobiographical first novel, O frio aqui fora (2013) (The Cold Outside), was also nominated for both the Prêmio Jabuti and the São Paulo Literature Award.

His subsequent books include Dez centimetros acima do chão (Ten centimeters above the ground), Espera passar o avião (Wait for the plane to pass), Diga que não me conhece (Tell me you don't know me) and O capricórnio se aproxima (Capricorn approaches).

In 2019, he led a writing course that was featured in a list of recommended courses by the newspaper, Estadão. In 2024, his novel, Diga que não me conhece (Tell me you don't know me) was adapted into a play performed at Teatro Itália and Teatro UOL in Sāo Paulo. He has also written a play titled Antes de mais nada (First of All).

== Works ==
=== Books ===
- O frio aqui fora (2013) Cosac Naify. ISBN 978-85-405-0665-7
- Dez centimetros acima do chão (2014) Faria e Silva. ISBN 978-65-81275-69-3
- Espera passar o avião (2018) (Wait for the plane to pass) Todavia. ISBN 978-85-88808-26-3
- Diga que não me conhece (2021) Todavia.
- O capricórnio se aproxima. E Galáxia. ISBN 978-85-8474-001-7

=== Plays ===
- Antes de mais nada.

== Awards ==
- Off-Flip literature award for short story (2013)
- The São Paulo Association of Art Critics best novel award (2018) for Diga que não me conhece
