= Maria Esther Maciel =

Brazilian poet and author

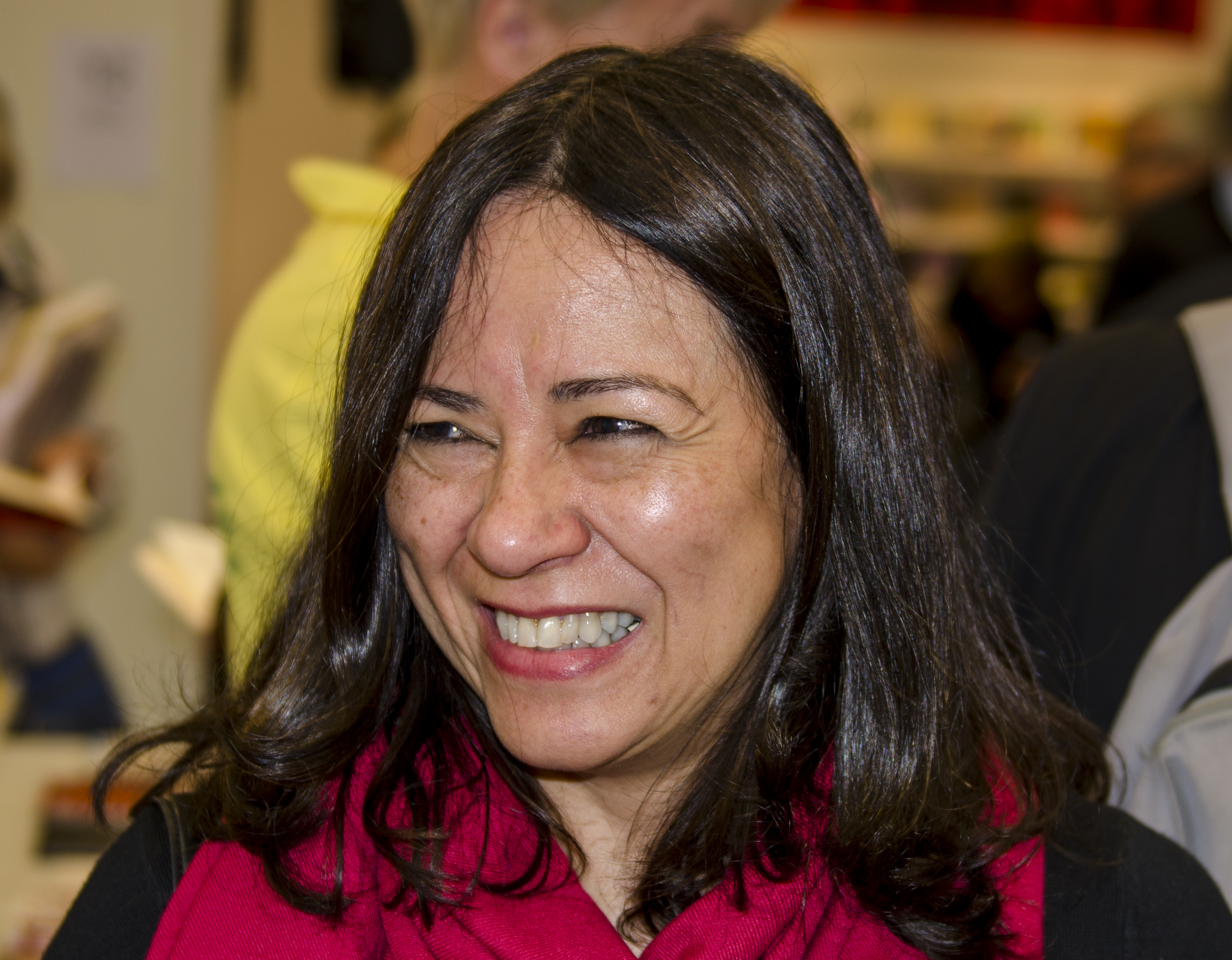
Maria Esther Maciel in 2014

Maria Esther Maciel is a Brazilian poet and author. She was born in Patos de Minas, Minas Gerais.

Her first novel O livro de Zenóbia appeared in 2005. Her second novel O livro dos nomes was a finalist for the São Paulo Literature Prize. She has also published several volumes of poetry and essays.
