= Marcelo Labes =

Brazilian writer (born 1984)

Marcelo Labes (born 1984) is a Brazilian writer, including novelist and poet.

== Early life and education ==
He was born in Blumenau, Santa Catarina, to a family of German immigrants.

== Career ==
He has written more than a dozen books, including novels and poetry collections. Notable works include Enclave (poetry) and the novels Paraízo-Paraguai, winner of the São Paulo Literature Prize for the best debut novel in 2020, and Três porcos, winner of the Machado de Assis Prize for best novel in 2021.

He is the founder of Caiaponte Editions.
