= Lívia Garcia-Roza =

Livia Garcia-Roza (born 1940) is a Brazilian writer and psychoanalyst. She was born in Rio de Janeiro. She studied clinical psychology at the Federal University of Rio de Janeiro. Her second husband was the writer Luiz Alfredo Garcia-Roza.

Livia made her literary debut in 1995 with the novel Quarto de Menina. Other noted titles include Diva Em Serie, Amor em Dois Tempos, Meus Queridos Estranhos, and Milamor. Milamor was nominated for the São Paulo Prize for Literature.
