= Beatriz Bracher =

Brazilian writer

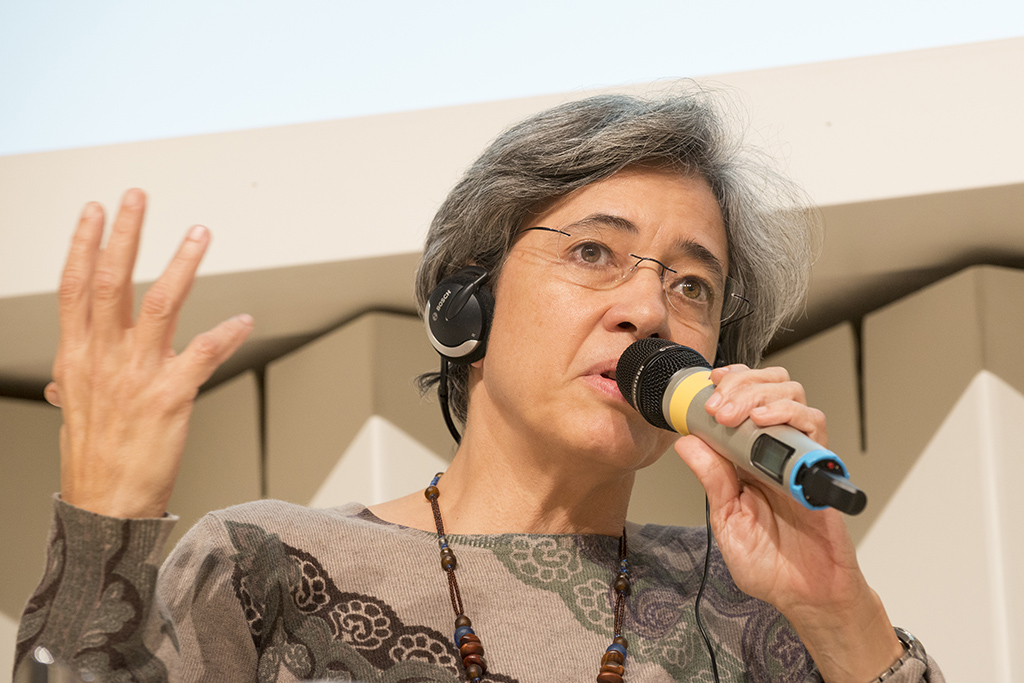
- Beatriz Bracher at the Frankfurt Book Fair, in 2013.
- Born: August 7, 1961; São Paulo, Brazil
- Education: Pontifical Catholic University of São Paulo, Pontifical Catholic University of Rio de Janeiro
- Occupations: Writer, screenwriter, editor
- Years active: 2002–present
- Known for: Anatomia do Paraíso, I Didn't Talk
- Notable work: Azul e Dura (2002); Não Falei (2004); Antonio (2007); Meu Amor (2009); Garimpo (2013); Anatomia do Paraíso (2015)
- Awards: São Paulo Prize for Literature (2015); Rio Prize for Literature (2015); Clarice Lispector Prize (2015)

Beatriz Bracher (born August 7, 1961) is a Brazilian writer.

Bracher was born in São Paulo, and studied Brazilian and Portuguese Literature at the Pontifical Catholic Universities of São Paulo and Rio de Janeiro. She was the founder and editor of the literary magazine 34 Letras from 1988 to 1991 and of Editora 34 publishing house, from 1992 to 2000. Bracher's first novel, Azul e Dura, was published in 2002. Her novel Anatomia do Paraíso (2015) won the São Paulo Prize for Literature and Rio Prize for Literature.

Bracher wrote the screenplay for the films Cronicamente Inviável (2000), Os Inquilinos (2009, Best Screenplay award at Festival do Rio) and O Abismo Prateado (2011).

== Published books ==
=== Novels ===
- 2002 - Azul e Dura
- 2004 - Não Falei (English translation: I Didn't Talk, translated by Adam Morris, New Directions Publishing, 2018 ISBN 978-0811227360)
- 2007 - Antonio (English translation: translated by Adam Morris, Pushkin Press, 2022 ISBN 978-1-78227-787-3)

Italian
Utopia)

- 2015 - Anatomia do Paraíso

=== Short stories ===
- 2009 - Meu Amor
- 2013 - Garimpo
