= Marcelo Ferroni =

Brazilian writer and editor

Marcelo Ferroni (born 1974) is a Brazilian writer and editor. He was born in São Paulo.

As an author, his books include the short story collection Dia dos mortos (2004), his debut novel Método prático de guerrilha (2010, winner of the São Paulo Prize for Literature), Das paredes, meu amor, os escravos nos contemplam (2014), O fogo na floresta (2017) and As maiores novidades: uma viagem no tempo (2021).

His work has been translated into Spanish and Italian.
