= Rubens Figueiredo =

Rubens Figueiredo (born 1956 in Rio de Janeiro) is a Brazilian writer and translator.

== Life and career ==
Figueiredo graduated in literature at the Federal University of Rio de Janeiro, specializing in Russian language and literature. He has worked for publishing houses in Rio de Janeiro and was a professor of literary translation at PUC-Rio. He has seven books to his credit, several of them awarded with Brazilian literary prizes.

A prolific translator, he is known for his translations of classics from Russian literature, such as works by Leo Tolstoy, Anton Chekhov, and Ivan Turgenev, as well as notable works from English and American literature, by authors such as Martin Amis, Paul Auster, Philip Roth and Susan Sontag.

== Works published ==
- 1986 - O mistério da samambaia bailarina
- 1987 - Essa maldita farinha
- 1990 - A festa do milênio
- 1994 - O livro dos lobos
- 1998 - As palavras secretas - Jabuti Award
- 2002- Barco a seco - Jabuti Award
- 2006 - O livro de Pedro
- 2010 - Passageiro do fim do dia - São Paulo Prize for Literature and Prêmio Portugal Telecom
