= Tatiana Salem Levy =

Brazilian writer and translator (born 1979)

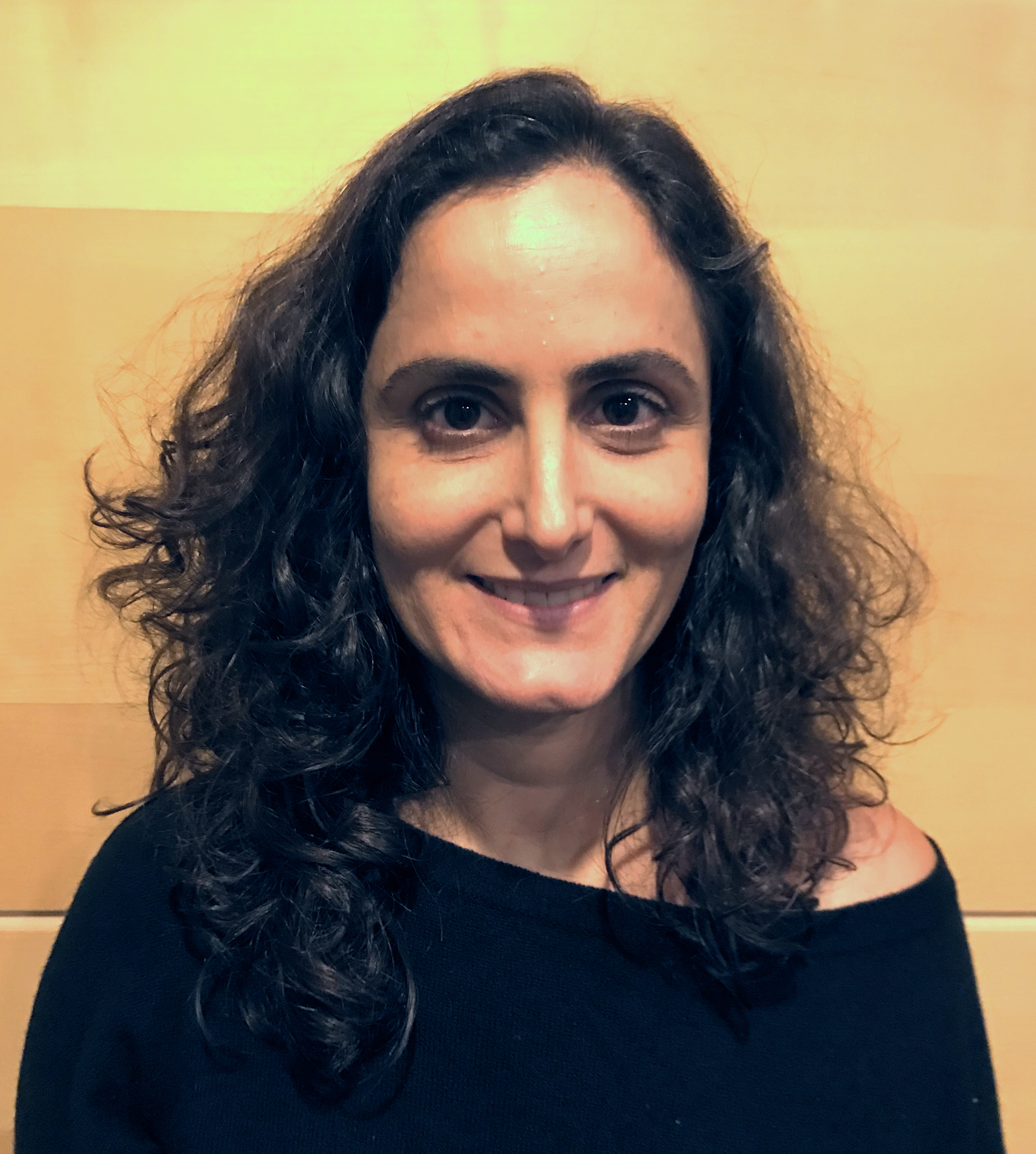
- Tatiana Salem Levy
- Born: January 1979 (age 47); Lisbon, Portugal
- Occupations: Writer, translator

Tatiana Salem Levy (born January 24, 1979 Lisbon) is a Brazilian writer and translator.

== Early life and education ==
Levy's parents are Turkish Jews established in Portugal during the Brazilian military government.

She studied literature at the Federal University of Rio de Janeiro and the Pontifical Catholic University of Rio de Janeiro.

She lives in Rio de Janeiro as of 2012.

== Honors and awards ==
- 2008 São Paulo Prize for Literature — Winner in the Best Book of the Year - Debut Author category for A Chave de Casa
- 2012 São Paulo Prize for Literature — Shortlisted in the Best Book of the Year category for Dois Rios
- 2012 Granta Best of Young Brazilian Novelists
- Finalista Prêmio Jabuti.

== Works ==
- Antologías: Paralelos (2004), 25 Mulheres que Estão Fazendo a Nova Literatura Brasileira (2005), Recontando Machado (2008), Dicionário Amoroso da Língua Portuguesa (2009).
- A Experiência de Fora: Blanchot, Foucault e Deleuze, Relume Dumará (2003).
- A Chave de Casa (2007).
  - English translation:The House in Smyrna; 2015, translated by Alison Entrekin, Scribe.
- Primos (2010), Editora Record.
- Em Silêncio (2011), Record para 2011.
- Dois Rios (2011), Editora Record.
- Vista Chinesa (2021), Editora Todavia.
  - English translation: Vista Chinesa:A Novel'; 2022 translated by Alison Entrekin, Scribe.
