= Edmar Monteiro Filho =

Edmar Monteiro Filho (born 1959) is a Brazilian writer. He was born in São Paulo and grew up in Amparo. He studied at the Federal University of São Paulo and the State University of Sao Paulo (Unicamp).

He began writing and publishing in 1980. He has received numerous prizes for his short stories and his poetry collections. His debut novel Fita Azul was nominated for the São Paulo Prize for Literature.
