= Javier Arancibia Contreras =

Brazilian writer (born 1976)

Javier Arancibia Contreras is a Brazilian writer. He was born in Salvador in 1976, to Chilean parents who went to exile in Brazil following the 1973 military coup in Chile.

A former crime reporter, he published his first novel Imóbile in 2008. It was a finalist for the São Paulo Literature Prize. In 2012, he was chosen by Granta magazine as one of the twenty best young Brazilian writers. His most recent novel is Crocodilo (2019).

== Selected works ==
- 2002 - Plínio Marcos — A crônica dos que não têm voz (Boitempo), with Fred Maia and Vinicius Pinheiro
- 2008 - Imóbile (7Letras)
- 2011 - O dia em que eu deveria ter morrido (Terceiro Nome)
- 2016 - Soy loco por ti, América (Companhia das Letras)
- 2019 - Crocodilo (Companhia das Letras)
