= Amílcar Bettega =

Amilcar Bettega Barbosa (born 1964) is a Brazilian writer. He was born in São Gabriel in Rio Grande do Sul. He has a PhD in Literature from the Sorbonne Nouvelle University. He is best known for his short story collections O voo da trapezita (1994), Deixe o quarto como está (2002) and Os lados do círculo (2004), and the novel Barreira (2013) which was shortlisted for the Sao Paulo Literature Prize.
