= Paula Fábrio =

Brazilian writer

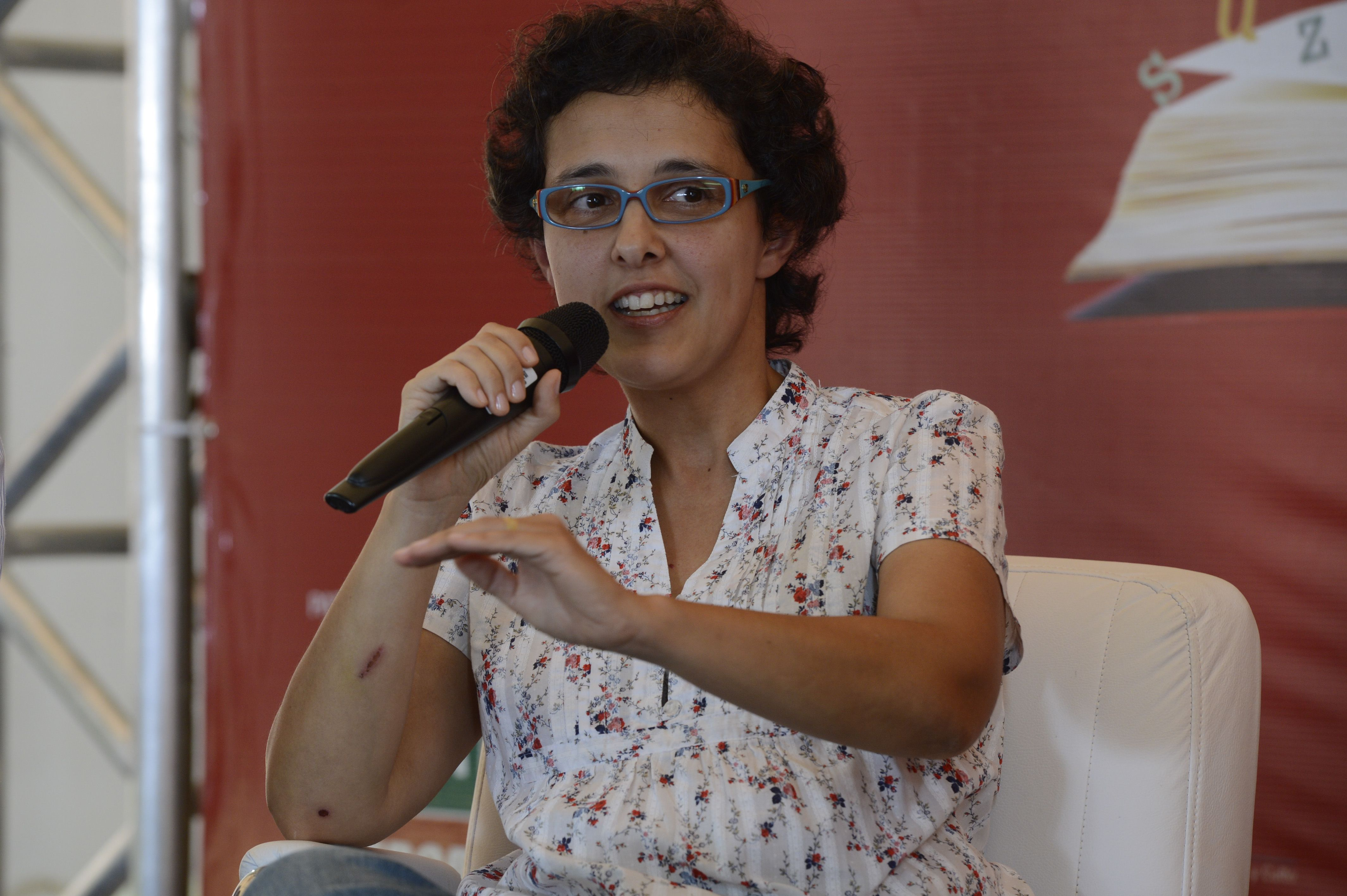
Image of Paula Fabrio

Paula Fábrio is a Brazilian writer. She was born in São Paulo in 1970. She completed her doctorate in literature from University of São Paulo.

She is best known for her debut novel Desnorteio which won the São Paulo Prize for Literature. Other notable titles include the novel Casa de Familia and the children's book No correia dos cobogós.
