= Marcos Peres =

Brazilian writer (born 1984)

Marcos Peres (born 1984) is a Brazilian writer. He was born in Maringá and studied law at the State University of Maringá. As a writer he is best-known for his debut novel O evangelho segundo Hittler (The Gospel According to Hitler) (2013), which received the São Paulo Prize for Literature for a debut novel by a writer under 40. He followed this up with a noir novel titled Que Fim Levou Juliana Klein?

His work has been translated into Spanish.
