= Ronaldo Correia de Brito =

Brazilian writer

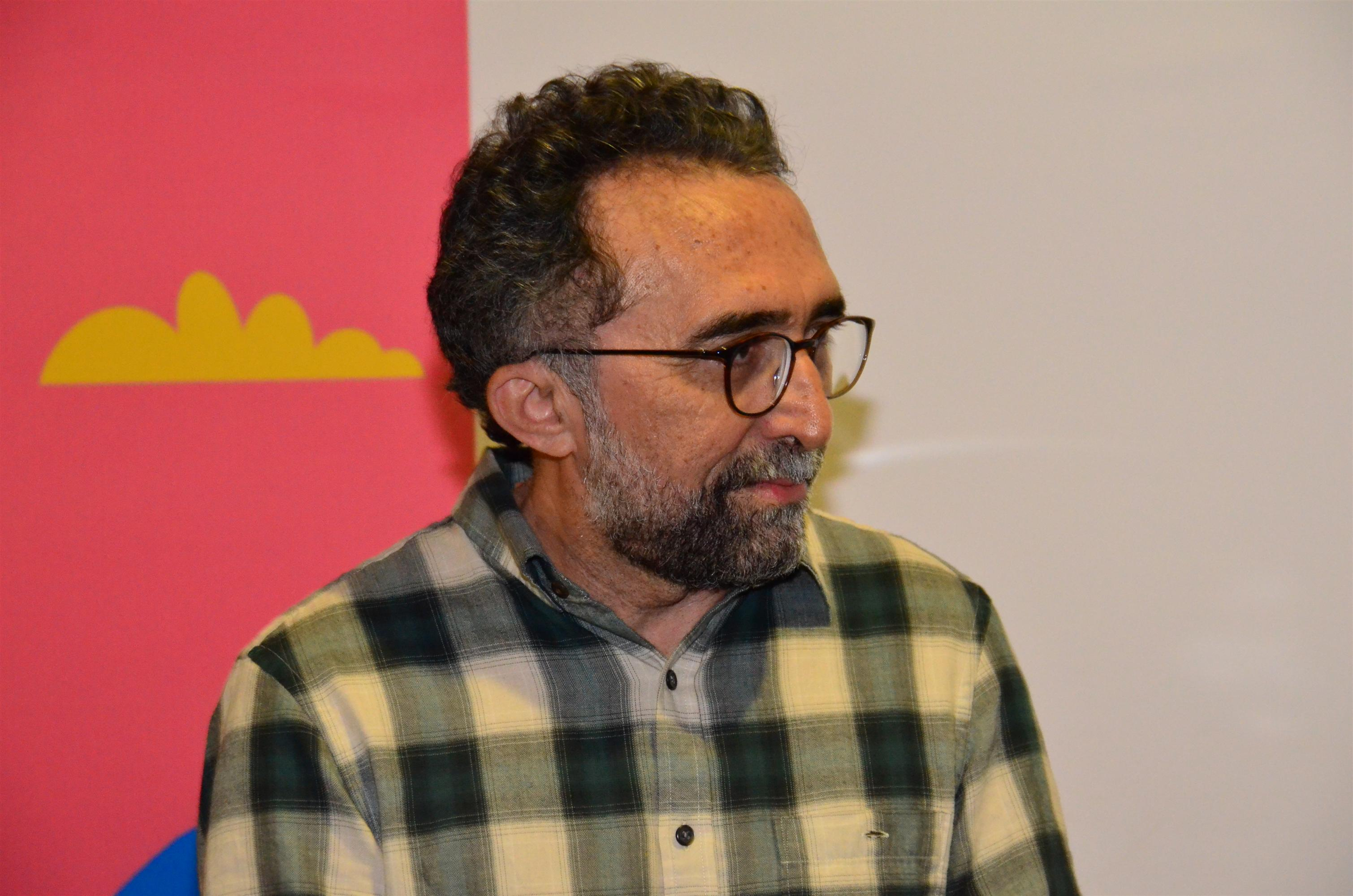
- Born: July 2, 1951 (age 74) Saboeiro, Ceará, Brazil
- Occupation: writer, playwright, physician

Ronaldo Correia de Brito (born July 2 , 1951) is a Brazilian writer, born in Saboeiro, Ceará. He studied medicine at the Federal University of Pernambuco and now works as a doctor in Recife. He is best known for his novel Galileia which won the 2009 Prêmio São Paulo de Literatura.

Other titles include:

- Rio sangue (novel, 2024)
- O amor das sombras (stories, 2015)
- Retratos imorais (stories, 2010)
- Livro dos Homens (stories, 2005)
- Faca (stories, 2003)
- Crônicas para ler na escola (2011)
- Baile do Menino Deus, play
- Bandeira de São João, play
- Arlequim, play
- O Pavão Misterioso, play
