= Eliane Marques =

Eliane Marques (born 1970) is a Brazilian poet and writer. She won the Sao Paulo Literature Prize for her 2023 novel Louças de família.

Other noted titles include:

- Relicario (2009)
- e se alguém o pano (2016, winner of Prêmio Açorianos)
- o poço das marianas (2022, winner of Premio Minuano)

She has also translated works by Georgina Herrera and Virginia Brindis de Salas into Portuguese.
