= Claudia Lage =

Brazilian screenwriter and novelist

Claudia Lage is a Brazilian screenwriter and novelist. She was born in 1979 in Rio de Janeiro. She is known for her work on Brazilian telenovelas. Her novels include O Corpo Interminável (winner of the Sao Paulo Literary Prize) and Mundos de Eufrásia, which was nominated for the same.
