= Carola Saavedra =

Brazilian writer

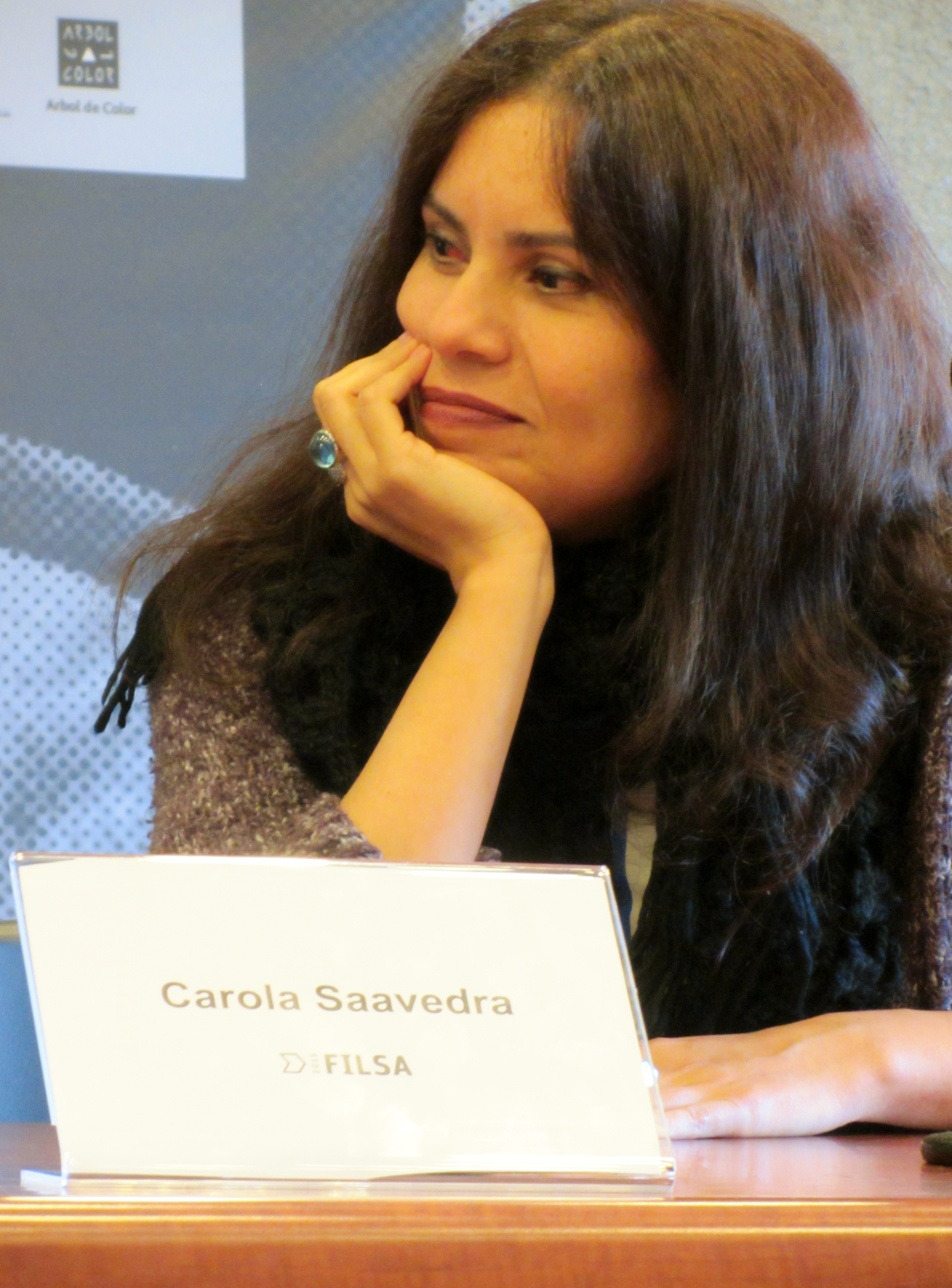
- Saavedra at Santiago International Book Fair, 2015
- Born: 1973 (age 52–53); Santiago, Chile
- Education: Pontifícia Universidade Católica do Rio de Janeiro
- Website: Official website

Carola Saavedra (born 1973) is a Chilean-born Brazilian writer.

== Biography and career ==
Saavedra was born in Santiago, but moved with her family to Brazil when she was three years old. She graduated in journalism by Pontifícia Universidade Católica do Rio de Janeiro. She lived in Spain, France and Germany, where she got a master's degree in communication studies. She lives in Rio de Janeiro.

Saavedra was an invited author at Festa Literária Internacional de Paraty (Flip) in 2010. In September 2018, Carola Saavedra launched her novel Com armas sonolentas in Porto Alegre.

== Works ==
- Do lado de fora (short stories, 7Letras, 2005)
- Toda terça (novel, Companhia das Letras, 2007)
- Flores azuis (novel, Companhia das Letras, 2008) - Published in English by Penguin Random House as "Blue Flowers" (2020), translated by Daniel Hahn
- Paisagem com dromedário (novel, Companhia das Letras, 2010)
- O inventário das coisas ausentes (novel, Companhia das Letras, 2014)
- Com armas sonolentas (novel, Companhia das Letras, 2018)

=== Participation in anthologies ===
- Um homem célebre: Machado recriado (Publifolha, 2008)
- Escritores escritos (Editora Flâneur, 2010)
- Essa história está diferente – Dez contos para canções de Chico Buarque (Companhia das Letras, 2010)
- Geração Zero Zero (Língua Geral, 2011)
- Granta Magazine's The Best of Young Brazilian Novelists anthology (2012)

== Awards and nominations ==
- Premio APCA for Best Novel, 2008, for Flores azuis
- Prêmio Rachel de Queiroz, Young Author category, 2010, for Paisagem com dromedário

Saavedra was a runner-up for São Paulo de Literatura and Jabuti prizes.
