= Xico Sá =

Brazilian journalist and writer

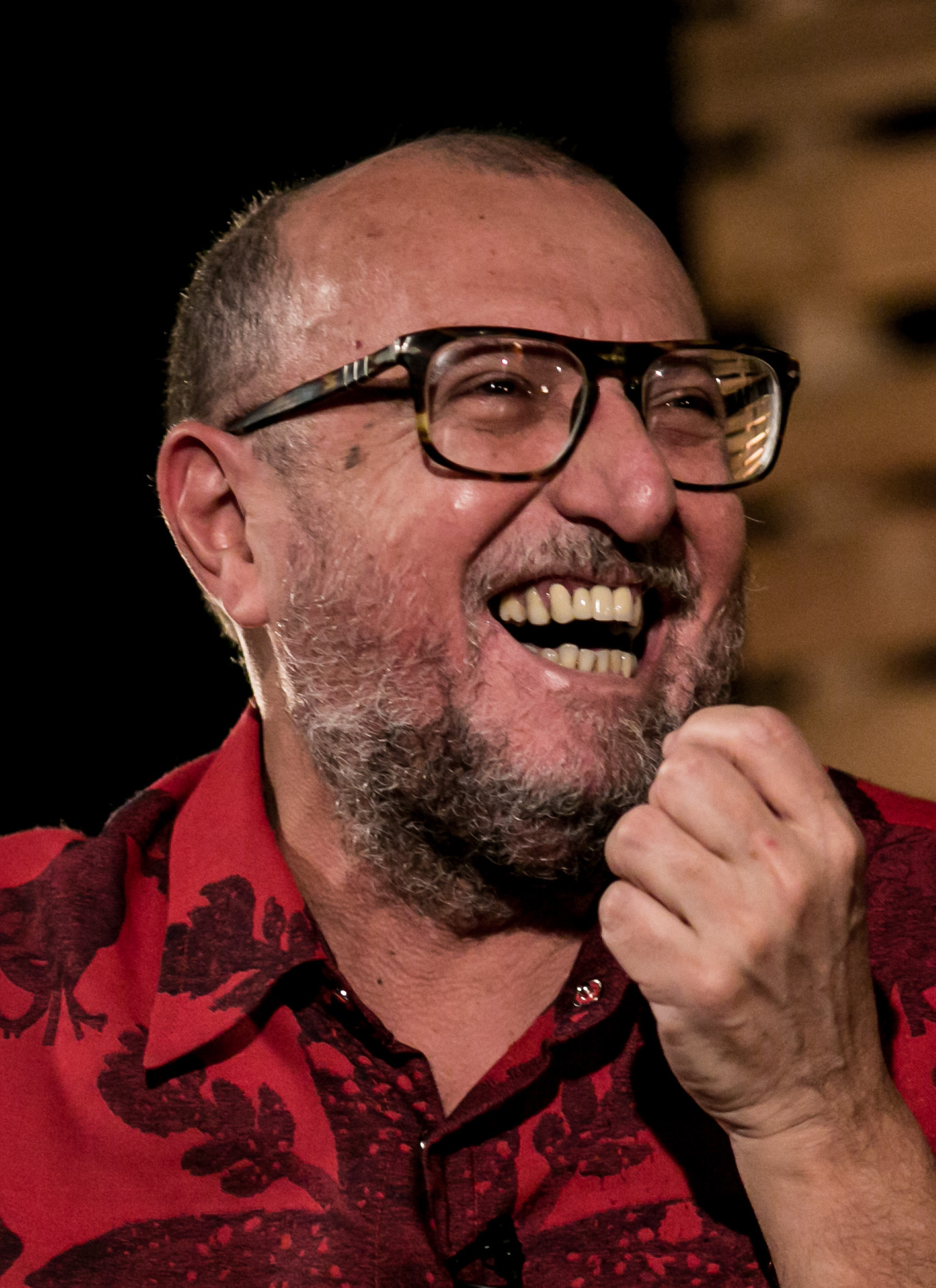
- Born: 6 October 1962; Crato, Ceará, Brazil
- Occupations: journalist and writer
- Website: xicosa.blogfolha.uol.com.br

Francisco Reginaldo de Sá Menezes, also known as Xico Sá, (born 6 October 1962) is a Brazilian journalist and writer. He was born in Crato, Ceará and grew up in Recife, where he began his career.

Xico Sá is the author of more than a dozen books, including Big Jato (2012) which was nominated for the São Paulo Prize for Literature.

He has collaborated to the newspapers Folha de S. Paulo, Diário do Nordeste, and O Tempo, among others. In television, he was a panelist for programs such as Saia Justa and Papo de Segunda for GNT, and Cartão Verde for TV Cultura.

== Selected works ==
- Modos de macho & Modinhas de Fêmea - Editora Record (2003)
- Divina Comédia da Fama - Editora Objetiva (2004)
- Catecismo de Devoções, Intimidades & Pornografias - Editora do Bispo (2006)
- Chabadabadábadu - Editora Record (2010)
- Big Jato -. Companhia das Letras (2012)
- O Livro das Mulheres Extraordinárias - Editora Três Estrelas (2014)
- Sertão Japão - Editora Casa de Irene (2018)
- A falta: Memórias de um goleiro - Tusquets editores (2022)
