= Tiago Novaes =

Brazilian writer

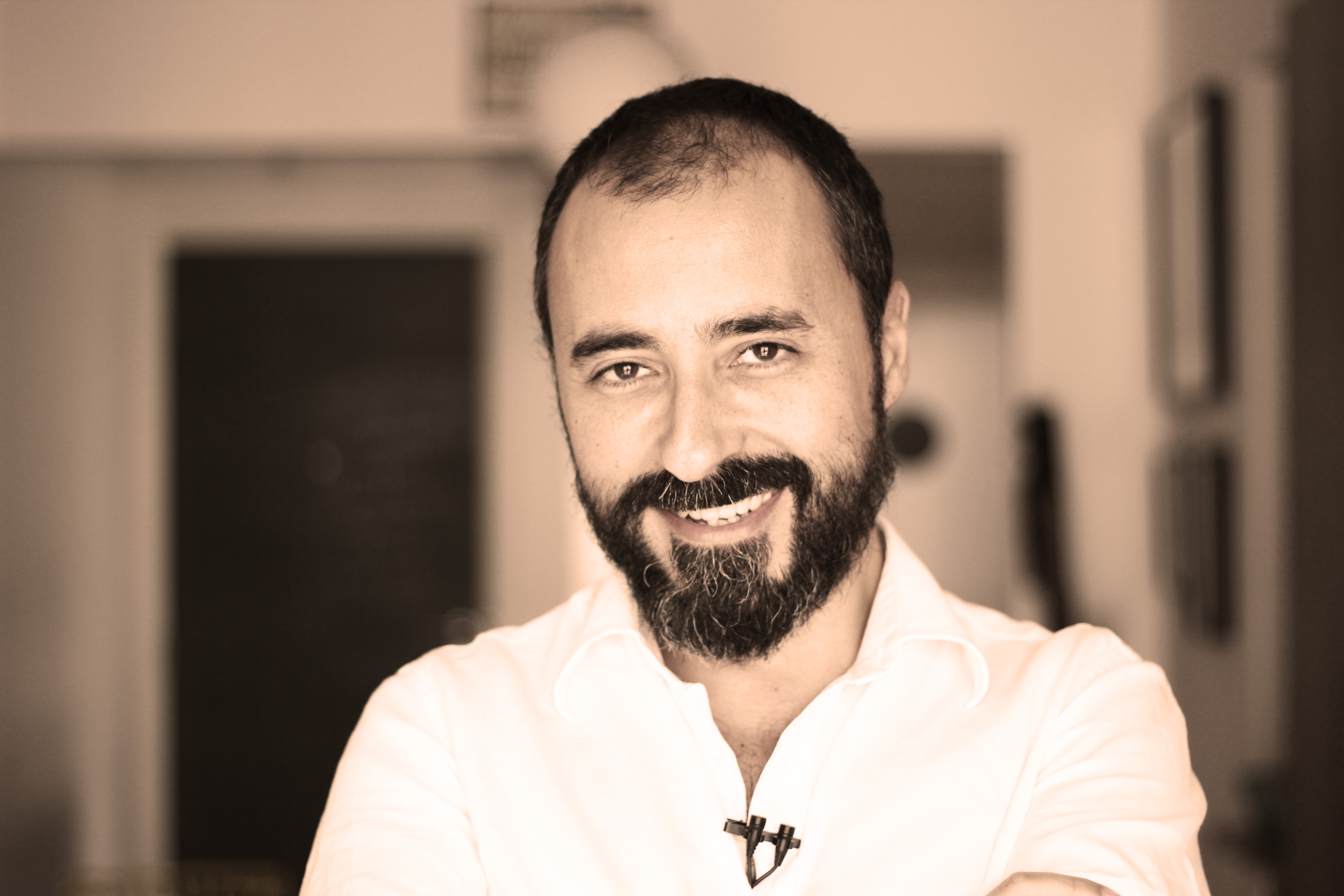
Novaes in 2015

Tiago Novaes (born 1979) is a Brazilian writer. He was born in Avaré, São Paulo, and studied psychology at the University of São Paulo. The author of more than half a dozen books, his noted works include Estado Vegetativo (Callis, 2007) which was nominated for the São Paulo Prize for Literature and Tertúlia: o autor como leitor (Sesc Edições, 2013) which was nominated for the Premio Jabuti.
