= Altair Martins =

Brazilian writer

Altair Teixeira Martins (born 1975) is a Brazilian writer. He was born in Porto Alegre, Rio Grande do Sul. He studied at Federal University of Rio Grande do Sul (UFRGS).

His debut title, published when he was 24, was a short story collection titled Como se moesse ferro (1999). He published his second book of short stories Se chovessem Pássaros in 2003. His debut novel A parede no escuro (2008) - originally his master's dissertation at UFRGS - won the São Paulo Literature Prize. His next book, a short story collection called Enquanto água (2012), won the Moacyr Scliar Prize. His 2014 novel Terra Avulsa was again part of his PhD thesis at UFRGS. He published a road novel titled Os donos do inverno in 2019.

Martins has also written plays. He has taught at PUCRS.
