= Walther Moreira Santos =

Walther Moreira Santos (born 1979) is a Brazilian writer and illustrator. He was born in Vitória de Santo Antão, Pernambuco. He has written and illustrated numerous books for children. For adults, his noted works include O Piloto, Dentro da Chuva Amarela and O Ciclista. The latter was nominated for the Sao Paulo Prize for Literature.

His book O ano do nirvana won the 9th Prêmio Kindle de Literatura in 2025.
