= Wesley Peres =

Brazilian writer and psychiatrist

Wesley Peres (born 1975) is a Brazilian writer and psychiatrist. He was born in Goiânia, and studied at the Federal University of Goiás and the University of Brasília. His debut novel Casa entre vértebras won the 2006 Sesc Literature Prize and was also nominated for the Sao Paulo Prize for Literature. A prize-winning poet, he has also published several volumes of poetry, including Palimpsestos, Rio Revoando and Água anônima.
