= Ivone Castilho Benedetti =

Brazilian translator (born 1947)

Ivone Castilho Benedetti (born 1947) is a Brazilian writer and translator. She was born in São Paulo. Her debut novel Immaculada was nominated for the Sao Paulo Literary Prize. Her other books include Tenho um cavalo alfaraz and Cabo de guerra. She has written a book on verb conjugations in Portuguese.

Benedetti is a prolific translator.
