= Aline Bei =

Brazilian writer

Aline Bei (born 1987) is a Brazilian writer. She was born in São Paulo, and studied at the Pontifícia Universidade Católica de São Paulo. She won the Prêmio São Paulo de Literatura for her debut novel O peso do pássaro morto (2017). A more recent work, Pequena coreografia do adeus (2021), was nominated for the Premio Jabuti.

== Education ==
She holds a degree in Literature from the PUC-SP and in Performing arts from the Célia Helena Center for Arts and Education, also in São Paulo.

== Awards and recognition ==
After winning the Prêmio Toca, created by writer Marcelino Freire, she published her first novel in 2017, titled O Peso do Pássaro Morto (The Weight of the Dead Bird). With it, she won the São Paulo Prize for Literature in 2018 in the category Best Novel by an Author Under 40. In 2020, the book was adapted for streaming theater with concept and performance by Helena Cerello, directed by Nelson Baskerville with original music by Daniel Maia. The adaptation was later performed live as a stage monologue.

In 2022, Bei was again a finalist for the São Paulo Prize for Literature and was among the five finalists of the 64th Jabuti Prize in the Literary Novel category for her second book, Pequena coreografia do adeus.

== Works ==
=== Novels ===
- 2017 – O Peso do Pássaro Morto (Note: Originally published in 2017 by Editora Nós and reissued in 2025 by Companhia das Letras.)
- 2021 – Pequena coreografia do adeus
- 2025 – Uma delicada coleção de ausências

All books have 2025 editions published by Companhia das Letras.

=== Short stories ===
- 2018 – Ego
- 2019 – Dente torto (short story in the anthology "Contos brutos")
- 2020 – Ruth sem medo (short story in the anthology "Pandemônio: Nove narrativas entre São Paulo – Berlim")
- 2020 – Rua sem saída
