= Ricardo Lísias =

Brazilian writer (born 1975)

Ricardo Lísias (born July 7, 1975) is a Brazilian writer.

Born in São Paulo, he debuted in literature in 1999 with the novel Cobertor de estrelas, which he wrote while still studying Literature at the University of Campinas. He was a finalist for the 2008 Jabuti Prize with Anna O. e outras novelas (which included a reprint of the short stories Capuz and Dos nervos, previously published in short print) and the 2010 São Paulo Literature Award for O livro dos mandarins. His story Tólia was selected for the English magazine Granta The Best Young Brazilian Writers edition, in 2012.

== Works ==
- 1999 - Cobertor de estrelas
- 2001 - Capuz
- 2004 - Dos nervos
- 2005 - Duas praças
- 2007 - Anna O. e outras novelas
- 2009 - O livro dos mandarins
- 2012 - O céu dos suicidas
- 2013 - Divórcio
- 2015 - Concentração e outros contos
- 2016 - Inquérito policial: família Tobias
- 2016 - A vista particular
- 2017 - Diário Da Cadeia
- 2018 - Diário da catástrofe brasileira: I - transição

=== Children's books ===
- 2001 - Sai da Frente, Vaca Brava
- 2005 - Greve Contra a Guerra
- 2014 - A Sacola Perdida
