= Estevão Azevedo =

Estevão Azevedo is a Brazilian writer. He was born in Natal, Rio Grande do Norte. He studied literature at the University of São Paulo.

He is known for his 2014 novel Tempo de espalhar pedras which won the São Paulo Award for Literature. Other titles include the short-story collection O som de nada acontecendo and the novel Nunca o nome do menino.

He lives in São Paulo.
