= Marcelo Maluf =

Marcelo Maluf (born 1974) is a Brazilian writer of Lebanese and Syrian origin. He was born in Santa Bárbara D'Oeste and studied at UNESP.

He is best known for his novel A imensidão particulares dos carneiros which was a winner of the São Paulo Literature Award in 2016. He also writes books for children.

Noted titles include:

- The Last Days of Elias Ghandour
- Esquece tudo agora
- As mil e uma histórias de Manuela
- Jorge do Pântano que fica logo Ali
- Meu pai sabe voar

Maluf lives and works in São Paulo.
