= Roberto Schaan Ferreira =

Brazilian writer

Roberto Schaan Ferreira is a Brazilian writer. He was born in Passo Fundo in 1958, and grew up in Rincao do Inferno.

He is best known for his books Por que os ponchos são negros? and Deus estava longe. His work is deeply rooted in his native state of Rio Grande de Sul and his books are recognized as important contemporary examples of regional Brazilian literature. Por que os ponchos são negros? was nominated for the Sao Paulo Prize for Literature.

In his professional life, Schaan Ferreira is a lawyer and judge.
