= Ana Luísa Escorel =

Brazilian designer, writer

Ana Luisa Escorel is a Brazilian designer and writer. She was born in São Paulo in 1944. Her parents were Gilda de Mello e Souza and Antonio Candido. She had two sisters, Laura de Mello e Souza and Marina de Mello e Souza.

She studied at the Escola Superior de Desenho Industrial (ESDI), where her teachers included Aloisio Magalhães, Frederico Morais and Zuenir Ventura. She started her career with Aloísio Magalhães, and later taught graphic design at the Pontifical Catholic University of Rio de Janeiro (PUC-Rio). In 1980, she cofounded the first all-female design company in Brazil with Evelyn Grumach and Heloisa Faria. Later, she went on to found or cofound establishments such as 19 Design and Ouro sobre Azul Design e Editora, and published the complete works of Antonio Candido.

== Selected works ==
- The Multiplier Effect of Design (1999), winner of the Museu da Casa Brasileira Award
- O Pai, a Mãe e a Filha (2010)
- Anel de Vidro (2013), first time the São Paulo Prize for Literature was awarded to a female writer
- Livro dos Ex-Libris (2016)
