= Ronaldo Wrobel =

Brazilian writer and poet lawyer

Ronaldo Wrobel (born 1968) is a Brazilian short-story writer and novelist. He was born in Rio de Janeiro. He was born to an Ashkenazi Jewish family that had migrated from Eastern Europe.

He is the author of the novels Traduzindo Hannah (Record, 2010) and Propósitos do Acaso (Nova Fronteira, 1998); the former was nominated for the Sao Paulo Prize for Literature. He has also published the short story collection A Raiz Quadrada e Outras Historias and a book on Jewish traditions Nossas Festas – Celebracoes Judaicas.

Ronaldo writes for the Jewish magazine Menorah. His work has been translated into Hebrew. His name was mentioned in the Panama Papers in 2015.
