= Antonio Geraldo Figueiredo Ferreira =

Antonio Geraldo Figueiredo Ferreira is a Brazilian writer. He was born in Mococa, São Paulo, and studied literature at the University of São Paulo.

His debut novel As Visitas Que Hoje Estamos appeared in 2012 to critical acclaim, and was nominated for the Sao Paulo Prize for Literature. Other works include the gigantic novel Siameses, the volume of poetry Peixe e Míngua and the children's book O Amor Pega Feito Um Bocejo. He is regarded as one of the most significant writers in contemporary Brazilian literature.
