= Franklin Carvalho =

Franklin Carvalho is a Brazilian writer. He was born in Araci in 1968. He studied at the Federal University of Bahia. He is best known for his novel Céus e Terra (2016), which won the São Paulo Literature Prize. His other works include: A Ordem Interior do Mundo Eu, que não amo ninguém and Tesserato: a Tempestade a Caminho.
