= Cíntia Lacroix =

Cintia Lacroix is a Brazilian writer and lawyer.

== Life and career ==
Lacroix was born in Porto Alegre in 1969. She studied law at UFRGS and studied journalism at PUC Brazil. She is best known for her debut novel Sanga Menor which was a finalist for the Sao Paulo Prize for Literature. Her second novel Tarantata appeared in 2014.
