= Luciany Aparecida =

- Born: 1982 (age 43–44); Vale do Jequiriçá, Bahia, Brazil
- Other names: Ruth Ducaso, Margô Paraíso, and Antônio Peixôtro
- Education: Doctorate of Letters from Universidade Federal da Paraíba (UFPB)
- Occupations: Author and professor
- Partner: Natalia Borges Polesso
- Website: https://lucianyaparecida.com.br/

Luciany Aparecida Alves Santos (born 1982) is a Brazilian writer, researcher, and professor. While she is originally from the Charco region in the Vale do Jiquiriçá in Bahia state, she now lives in São Paulo and is a professor at the Pontifical Catholic University of São Paulo (PUC-SP). She is best known for her recent novel, Mata Doce, which was a finalist for the Prêmio Jabuti in 2024 and won the Prêmio São Paulo de Literatura (The São Paulo Literature Award) in 2024 under the category Best Novel of 2023.

== Biography and personal life ==
Luciany Aparecida was born in 1982 in Jaguaquara, in the Jequiriçá Valley of Bahia, Brazil. She was raised in a rural community called Charco in rural Irajuba, and municipality of Santa Inês, Bahia. Her mother, Luci Iara Vieira Alves, had complications during labor and was wrongly declared deceased. During the false alarm, her cousin Nilza named the surviving child Aparecida, and then Luci recovered. So, the name Luciany Aparecida came from the combination of her mother's name and Our Lady, to whom the miracle is attributed.

Until she was five years old, Aparecida was raised in her grandparents' home, alongside her mother, seven aunts, and six uncles. Being surrounded by adults, the elderly, and various forms of media, Luciany heard many stories and ideas from her family and those around her. However, at age five, her grandmother, Maria Ruth Vieira, took her to Santa Inês, where they lived alone for Luciany to go to school and receive a better education than what was available in Charco.

"My word has a geography and it will always be what we pretend is the Northeast, it will always have women, older women, and tensions regarding race and the patriarchy... I was raised by an old woman, so I head very old stories, the ones from the grandmothers of my grandmother, of my great- and great-great-grandmothers from the 19th century... When my grandmother's friends began to die, I realized that I had lived with a different generation than what my friends had experienced. I did not coexist with my mother's generation, rather with women in their 60s and 70s."

Until she was 19 years old, Luciany and Maria only visited Charco when they had a break from school, but Aparecida was learning skills that would later serve her writing. She published the first 200 copies of one of her first novels, Ezequiel, in an artisenal fashion, hand-sewing each one.

On November 27, 2025, she became engaged to author and translator Natalia Borges Polesso.

== Education and career ==
Aparecida completed her undergraduate education in Vernacular Letters at the State University of Feira de Santana (UEFS) in 2007, and her Master's (2011) and Doctorate (2015) degrees in Letters from the Federal University of Paraíba (UFPB). Under the scope of literary criticism, the author's studies emphasize literary theory, contemporary literature, and the intersectionality between history, memory, ancestrality, afro-diasporic culture, immigration, nationality, and performances. Her doctorate thesis received the evaluation "approved with distinction" due to her study of Poemário Modelosvivos (2010), by Ricardo Aleixo. Currently, she works at Pontifical Catholic University of São Paulo (PUCSP) as a Doctorate Professor in the Graduate Program of Literature and Literary Criticism.

Aside from being a professor, Aparecida is a prolific author who writes under various pennames about topics like colonial violence, patriarchy, and gender issues. She has stated she intends to pull readers from their comfort zones: "the author hopes, deliberately, to discomfort us from our possible places of normalization of toxic masculinity and of racism, technologies of power that operate on the maintenance of colonizer mindsets which have not been annihilated from the country." Aparecida's works serve as activist messages for the afro-brazilian, LGBTQ+, and feminist communities.

She also participates in various forums, interviews, and other media appearances to promote both her literature and her activism and especially the combination of the two. Thus, she removes herself from the limits of one sole platform and places herself in front of academic and social students alike.

== Aesthetic signatures ==
Luciany Aparecida, in addition to her own name, has three primary pseudonyms, or, as she prefers to call them, aesthetic signatures: Ruth Ducaso, Margô Paraíso, and Antônio Peixôtro.

As I invent names, heteronyms, I do not elaborate on only a creative literary work. So, I am not allowed, in this context rank with colonizer violence (patriarchy, toxic masculinity, racism, and homophobia), to just be creative. I always have to be creative and something more. Thus I say that I create, with the signatures, a theatrical, anti-colonizer creation. And not a heteronym marked by some personal tradition.

She is known for her work in poetry, drama, and fiction, under each pen name. Aparecida prefers to call her pen names aesthetic signatures, as she uses each pen name according to the general writing style she plans to use or the effect that she is wanting to have on her readers.

Ruth Ducaso is used for prose, which texts were often melancholic, depressive, or dealt with suicide. The name Ruth Ducaso was inspired by two sources. First was her grandmother, Maria Ruth Vieira, a literacy teacher, who encouraged Aparecida to write and also taught her about the problems of racism and other societal issues. Second, she desired to honor all of the Latin American women who came before her, using the name Ducaso (ao caso = the case) to reference the women during the colonial period of slavery who had to change their names with African origins to European names in order to survive.

Margô Paraíso is used for poetry and is often violent. Margô is short for Margarida (daisy). During Aparecida's childhood, her grandmother would often collect glass bottles to trade for daisies, a sign of their poor financial situation. Paraíso (paradise) is used to refer to issues with Christianty. Aparecida said that this name was heavily inspired by great and terrible scenes from the Bible.

Antônio Peixôtro is an illustrator. The name was chosen in honor of her grandfather, a quiet farmer with whom Aparecida would pass the time cloudwatching and listening to poetry on the radio.

Luciany Aparecida decided to start writing under her own name during the COVID-19 Pandemic. She decided she needed a new narrative to use, and that she wanted to create more representation for minority groups, many of which she herself is a part of as a black, lesbian woman, as such she decided to present herself more openly to the world.

== Works ==
All of the following works are hers, independent of the published name. She is also planning on publishing her next book, Tinta da Bahia (Bahia Ink or Tint of the Bahia) sometime in 2026 under the name of Luciany Aparecida.

Title	Genre	Published name	Publisher	Year	Edition	Number of pages
Contos Ordinários de Melancolia (Tales of Ordinary Melancholy)	Novel	Ruth Ducaso	Salvador: Paralelo13S	2019	2	82
Florim	Novel	Ruth Ducaso	Salvador: Boto cor-de-rosa livros, arte e café/paralelo13S	2020	1	67
Mata Doce	Novel	Luciany Aparecida	Rio de Janeiro: Alfaguara	2023	1	305
Ezequiel	Poetry	Margô Paraíso	Salvador: Pantim	2018	1	80
Macala	Poetry	Luciany Aparecida	São Paulo: Círculo de Poemas	2022	1	24
Joanna Mina	Theatre	Luciany Aparecida	Salvador: selo editorial paralelo13S	2022	1	134
Dramaturgias em processo: 2021 JOANNA MINA	Theatre	Luciany Aparecida	São Paulo: Teatro da Universidade de São Paulo	2021	1	480
40 em quarentena. Festejos de Liberdade. In: Jorge Marques	Anthology	Luciany Aparecida	Rio de Janeiro: Oficina Raquel	2020	1	1851
Memória de Passarinho. In: Tiburi, Marcia. (Org.). Ato Poético.	Anthology		Rio de Janeiro: Oficina Raquel	2020	1	1
Descuidosa de sua beleza. In: Nívia Maria Vasconcellos. (Org.)	Anthology		Itabuna: Mondrongo	2020	1	135-144
Correio literário. De Luciany Aparecida para Gloria Anzaldúa	Anthology	Luciany Aparecida	Rio de Janeiro: Bazar do Tempo	2024	--	--
Auto-retrato	Non-fiction	Ruth Ducaso and Antônio Peixôtro as the illustrator	Salvador: Pantim	2018	1	40
Cadernos Araxá	Non-fiction		Salvador: Pantim	2018	1	307
Estudos de literatura brasileira contemporânea. Vaga carne: a visão da voz	Non-fiction		--	2023	1	1-3
AFROASIA, Poesia e sociedade na literatura brasileira contemporânea	Non-fiction		--	2022	65	839-844
A Journal of Brazilian Literature. Fernanda Bastos. Selfie-purpurina	Non-fiction		Brasil/Brazil	2022	35	186-188
Revista Brasileira de Literatura Comparada. Não quero mais negar minha alma	Non-fiction		--	2021	23	140-145
Cerrados. Metamorfose das Feridas: Formação diaspórica na literatura contemporânea	Non-fiction		--	2021	30	1
Modelos vivos em uso: Poesia e performance de Ricardo Aleixo (em) um exercício crítico de literatura contemporânea	Non-fiction	Luciany Aparecida	Dissertation (Master's in Letters) - Federal University of Paraíba, João Pessoa	2015	1	254
