= Jacques Fux =

Brazilian writer (born 1977)

- Born: 9 July 1977 (age 49); Belo Horizonte, Brazil
- Education: Federal University of Minas Gerais
- Occupations: Writer, Professor
- Writing career
- Genres: Fiction, Nonfiction, Children, Mathematics
- Notable works: Antitherapies, Nobel, Meshugá

Jacques Fux (born 1977) is a Brazilian writer. He was born in Belo Horizonte. He has a Bachelor's degree in mathematics from Federal University of Minas Gerais, a Master's degree in Computer Sciences from UFMG, and a PhD in Comparative Literature from UFMG. In 2010, he received a PhD in French Language, Culture and Literature from UFMG. He completed postdoctoral work in Literary Theory at UNICAMP (State University of Campinas) from 2011 to 2013. In 2013, he completed additional postdoctoral work in Comparative Literature at the Federal University of Minas Gerais. Dr. Fux also went on to become a visiting scholar at Harvard University in Romance Language and Literature from 2012 to 2014; his studies there were sponsored by the writer Susan Suleiman.

Fux has published more than twenty books. His first novel Antiterapias (2012) was widely acclaimed and won the prestigious São Paulo Literary Prize. Other books include:

- Brochadas: confissões sexuais de um jovem escritor (2015)
- Literature and Mathematics: Jorge Luis Borges, Georges Perec e o OULIPO (2016)
- Meshugá: um romance sobre a loucura (2016)
- Nobel (2018)

== Career ==
=== Reception ===
Fux’s novel Antitherapies was widely acclaimed and received the prestigious São Paulo Prize for Literature in 2013. Haaretz described his observations in Antitherapies as “original and funny” and added: his “convoluting stream of consciousness is breathtaking”. Márcio Seligmann-Silva, winner of the Prêmio Jabuti in literary criticism, wrote that Fux's work Antitherapies is to be considered eloquent proof that Fux is representative of the best qualities in the newer Brazilian authors. Translated into English in 2026, Antitherapies has been hailed a "breathless narrative with a biting humor." by author and journalist Anna Stolley Persky for the Jewish Book Council:

"Fux’ work of autofiction, essentially a fictionalized memoir, is rich with irresistibly rhythmic prose and thought-provoking musings. Cleverly told through twenty-one “anti-therapeutic” stream-of-consciousness sessions, the novel chronicles how Fux, as narrator and main character, considered a variety of careers and life paths. With each session, Fux weaves in the tension between cultural assimilation and Jewish identity, as well as how the trauma of the Holocaust weighs heavily on generations of Jews in the diaspora."

Fux’s book “Nunca vou te perdoar por ter me obrigado a te esquecer” (I will never forgive you for having made me forget) was nominated for the Prêmio Jabuti, which is considered to be the most prestigious literature award in Brazil, for the Romance Literário (Literary Novel) category, and was a finalist for the award in 2024. Prior to becoming a finalist, Fux was a semifinalist for the Prêmio Jabuti for his children's book, O Enigma do Infinito.

==== Additional Honors ====
Fux's 2015 novel Brochadas: Confissões Sexuais de um Jovem Escritor, won an honorable mention in the Prêmio Cidade de Belo Horizonte (Belo Horizonte City Literary Prize), and his 2016 novel, Meshugá won the Prêmio Manaus de Literatura.

=== Collaborations ===
Fux has participated in many collaborations with other authors and artists, including the following:

Ménage literário, Literary menage, Ménage literario

- Published in 2020, this avant-garde multimedia book, written in Spanish, English, and Portuguese, includes a short story, followed by a critique of the story written by Rodrigo Lopes de Barros, and a short movie based on the written story directed by Lopes de Barros.

Alice no País das Maravilhas & Através do espelho e o que Alice viu por lá

- This 2023 Portuguese translation of Lewis Carroll’s classic, Alice in Wonderland, features afterwords by several authors and experts, including Fux.

== Selected Works ==
- Antiterapias (2012)
- Brochadas: confissões sexuais de um jovem escritor (2015)
- Meshugá (2016)
- Literatura e Matemática: Jorge Luis Borges, Georges Perec e o OULIPO (2016)
- Nobel (2018)
- Georges Perec: a psicanálise nos jogos e traumas de uma criança de guerra (2019)
- O enigma do infinito (2020)
- As Coisas de que Não me Lembro, sou (2022)
- Herança (2022)
- Nunca vou te perdoar por você ter me obrigado a te esquecer (2023)
- O tempo dá um tempo (2024)
- Um Labirinto Labiríntico (2024)
- Circenses (2025)
- Uma Impostora Em Harvard (2025)
- Guernica: A Arte Em Busca Da Paz (2026)
- Sertão-Veneza: Retornos e Travessias Roseanas (2026)

=== Translations ===
Several of Fux’s works have been translated into several languages, including English, Spanish, Hebrew, and Italian.

Title	Original Publication	Languages Translated	Years Translated	Translator
Antitherapias (Antitherapies)	2012	Hebrew	2019	Dalit Lahav-Durst
Antitherapias (Antitherapies)	2012	Spanish	2019	Rafael Climent-Espino
Antitherapias (Antitherapies)	2012	English	2026	Ana Cecilia Carvalho, Hal Reames, and Regina Igel
Herança	2022	Italian	2023	Vincenzo Barca
As Coisas de que Não me Lembro, sou	2022	English		Hillary Auker
Meshugá	2016	Italian	2019	Vincenzo Barca
O enigma do infinito	2020	Spanish	2024	Rafael Climent-Espino

=== Translation Work ===
Fux has co-translated several books including:

- (2016). Design e Crime. Belo Horizonte: Editora UFMG. ISBN 978-8542301571
  - Originally published (Design and Crime) in English in 2002 by Hal Foster, Fux co-translated this work into Portuguese in 2016 with Alcione Cunha.
- (2025). Desejos Cosmopolitas. Belo Horizonte: Editora UFMG. ISBN 9786558581697
  - Published in 2014 as Cosmopolitan Desires in English by Mariano Siskind, this was co-translated into Portuguese by Fux and Alcione Cunha in 2025.
- (2025). Bouvard e Pécuchet. Rio de Janeiro: Editora 7 Letras. ISBN 9786559059140
  - Written by Gustave Flaubert and published in 1881 after his death in the original French, this was co-translated by Jacques Fux and Fernanda Ferreira dos Santos into Portuguese in 2025.
