= Antônio Salvador =

Júlio César Pereira, also known as Antonio Salvador (born 1981) is a Brazilian writer and lawyer. He was born in Natal and lives in Berlin. As a writer he is known for his novel A condessa de Picaçurova which was nominated for the Sao Paulo Prize for Literature. In 2018, he gained notoriety in the Lusophone literary world for inventing a lucrative book prize called the Babel Book Prize.
