= Mariana Salomão Carrara =

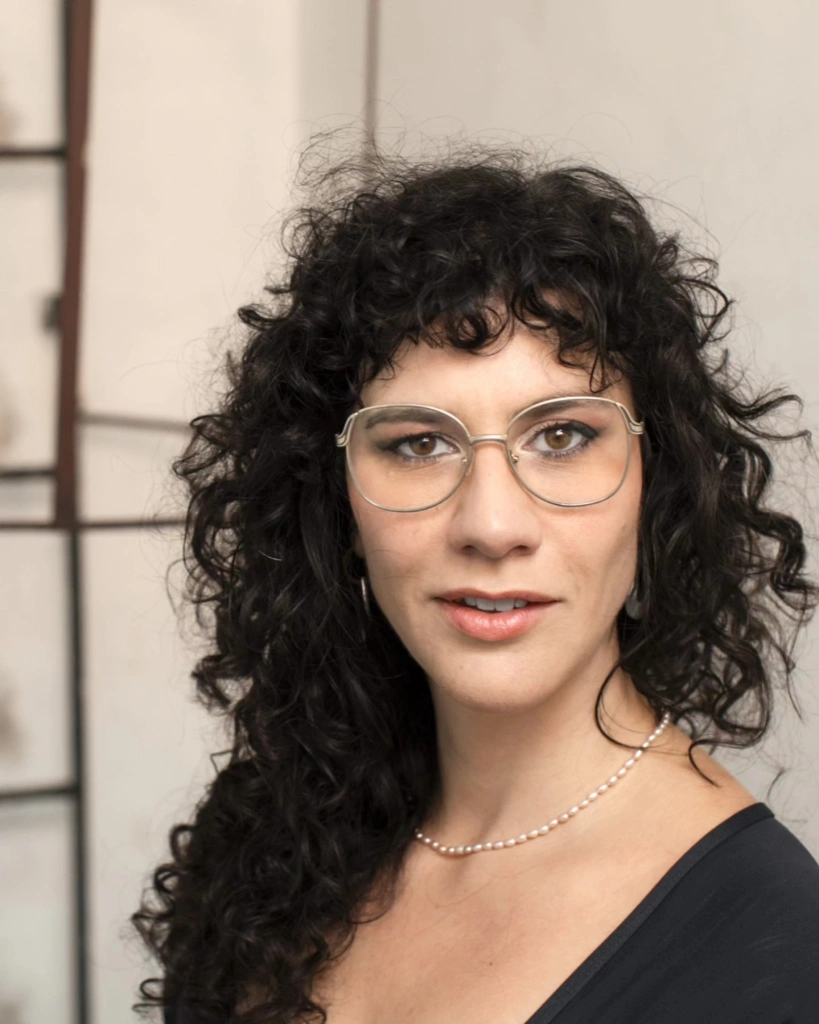
Mariana Carrara

Mariana Salomão Carrara (born 1986) is a Brazilian writer and lawyer. She published her first book Idílico (2007) when she was still a student at the University of São Paulo. Since her graduation in 2009, she has worked as a public defender while continuing her literary career in parallel.

== Selected works ==
- Se deus me chamar não vou (2019)
- É sempre a hora da nossa morte amém (2021)
- Não fossem as sílabas do sábado (2022)
- A árvore mais sozinha do mundo (2024)

== Awards and honours ==
Não fossem as sílabas do sábado won the São Paulo Prize for Literature in 2023.
