= Frederico Barbosa =

Brazilian poet

Frederico Barbosa (born Recife, Pernambuco on February 20, 1961) is a Brazilian poet.

== Places of residence ==
Barbosa moved with his family to São Paulo, where he currently lives, when he was six. He lived for some time in the United States, in New Haven, Connecticut, Cambridge, Massachusetts and Austin, Texas.

== Education ==
Barbosa began undergraduate studies in physics and Greek at the University of São Paulo, where he majored in Portuguese Language and Brazilian and Portuguese Literature. He never completed his master's program in Brazilian Literature.

== Career ==
A literary critic at the Jornal da Tarde and Folha de S.Paulo for some years, he currently directs one of the most important cultural centers in Brazil, the Casa das Rosas - Espaço Haroldo de Campos de Poesia e Literatura.

== Awards and recognition ==
- 2008 São Paulo Prize for Literature — Chosen to serve as a member of the Board of Trustees

== Works ==
His poems have been published in various journals in Brazil. His first book, Rarefato (Editora Iluminuras, 1990), was chosen by the newspapers O Estado de S. Paulo and O Estado de Minas (Belo Horizonte) as one of the best books published in the country that year.

His second book, Nada Feito Nada (Editora Perspectiva,1993), was published by the prestigious Coleção Signos, edited by Haroldo de Campos, and was awarded the most important literary prize in the country, the Jabuti Prize.

Recently, his poems have been translated and published in anthologies in several countries, as the United States, Australia, Mexico, Spain and Colombia.

In 2000, Frederico Barbosa published Cinco Séculos de Poesia - Anthology of Classic Brazilian Poetry, (Landy Editora) and Contracorrente - poems, (Iluminuras). In 2001 Frederico Barbosa published an annotaded edition of the episodes Inês de Castro and O Velho do Restelo, from The Lusíadas, by Luís de Camões (Landy Editora) and released his fourth book of poetry, Louco no Oco sem Beiras - Anatomia da Depressão, by Ateliê Editorial.

In 2002 Frederico Barbosa published, with Claudio Daniel, an anthology of contemporary Brazilian poetry, Na Virada do Século - Poesia de Invenção no Brasil (Landy Editora) and released his fifth book of poetry, Cantar de amor entre os escombros, also by Landy. For this publishing house, he created and edits the Alguidar Collection. In 2004 he published A Consciência do Zero (Lamparina) and won his second Jabuti Prize with Brasibraseiro.

In 2016, Frederico started working at Colégio Equipe.
