= Reni Adriano =

Reni Adriano is a Brazilian novelist and playwright. He was born in Santa Luzia, Minas Gerais, and grew up in Raul Soares, Zona da Mata and in São Paulo. He studied philosophy at PUC-SP. He is best known for his debut novel Lugar which was nominated for the Sao Paulo Prize for Literature. He has also written plays, including De volta a Reims, based on the famous work by Didier Eribon.
