= Rita Carelli =

Brazilian writer and actor

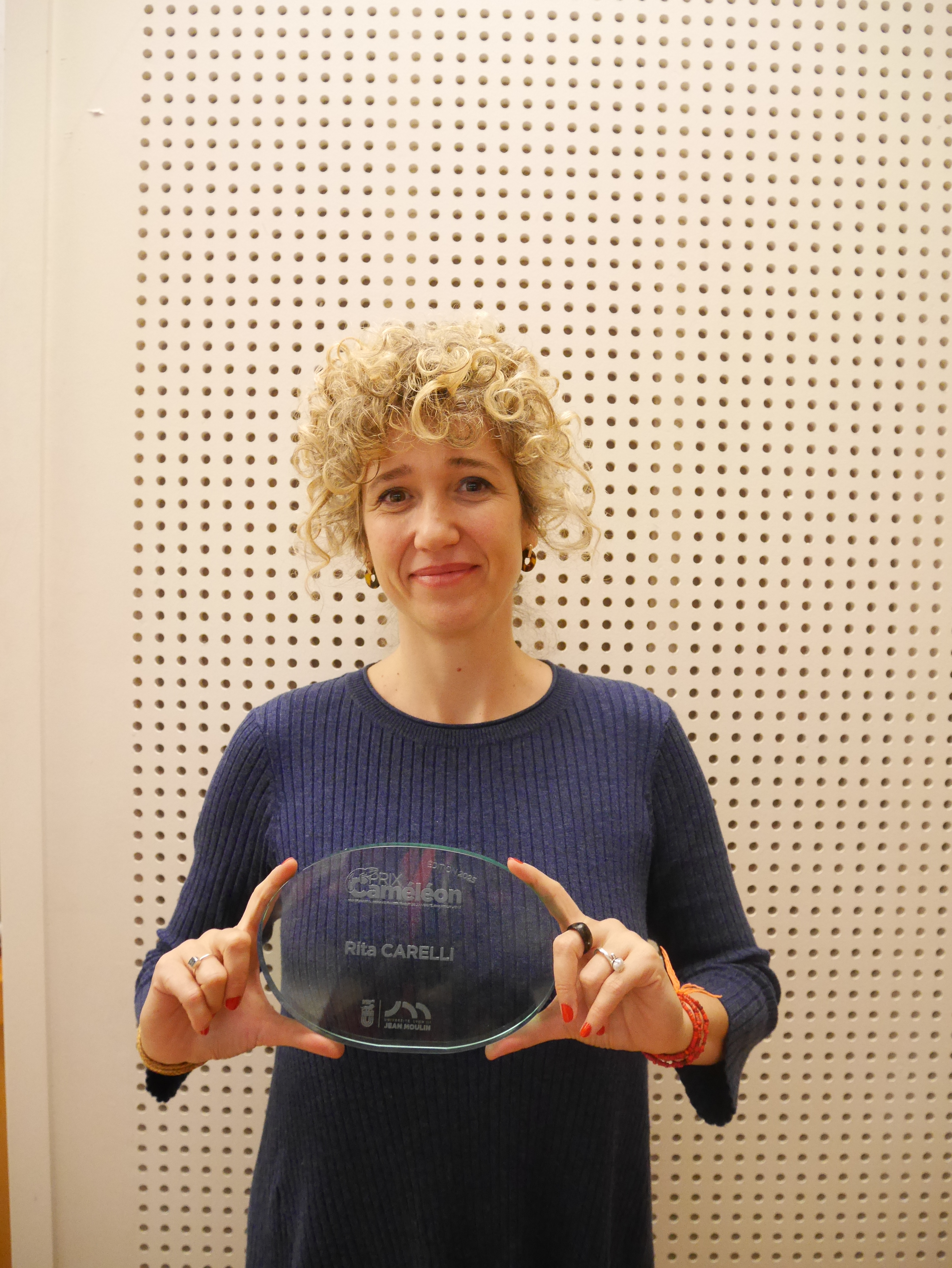

Rita Carelli (born 25 January 1984) is a Brazilian writer, actress, and director. She studied at the Federal University of Pernambuco and trained at the Jacques Lecoq School in Paris.

Carelli is the daughter of prominent anthropologists Vincent Carelli and Virgínia Valadão, and much of her artistic work revolves around the Amazon, its ecology, and its indigenous peoples. She has written several children's books focusing on this subject. Her debut novel, Terrapreta, won the São Paulo Literary Prize. She has also worked closely with indigenous leader and thinker Ailton Krenak.

Carelli has acted in a number of films. She also wrote and directed the 2019 short film A Era de Lareokotô.
