= Francisco J.C. Dantas =

Francisco Dantas (born 1941) is a Brazilian novelist and professor. He was born in Riachao do Dantas in the state of Sergipe. He published his debut novel Coivara da Memória (1991) at the age of 50, and developed a reputation as a noted regionalist writer, continuing to live in Sergipe, far from mainstream literary circles. Later books include Os Desvalidos (1993), Cartilha do silêncio (1997) and Uma jornada como tantas (2019).

The 2012 novel Caderno de ruminações was nominated for the Sao Paulo Literary Prize.

He taught literature at the Federal University of Sergipe, and lives in the state capital of Aracaju.
