= Ivana Arruda Leite =

Brazilian writer

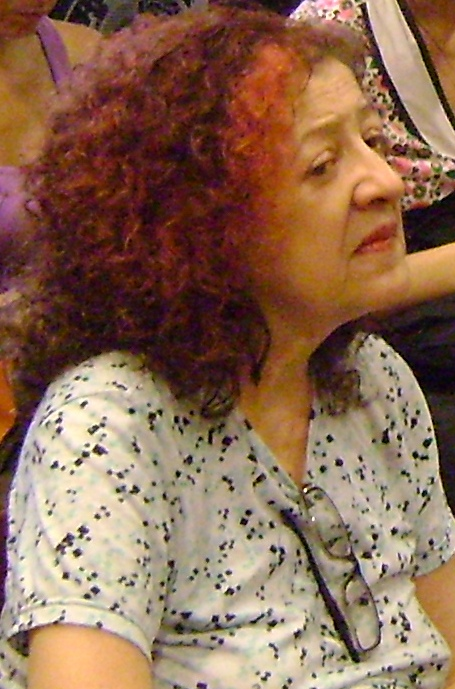
- Leite in 2010
- Born: 1951 (age 74–75); Araçatuba, São Paulo (state), Brazil
- Education: University of São Paulo
- Occupation: writer

Ivana Arruda Leite (born 1951) is a Brazilian writer.

== Biography ==
Leite was born in Araçatuba, São Paulo, and began to write as a teenager. She holds master's degree in sociology from the University of São Paulo.

Leite is best known as a writer of short stories, and has published several collections, notably:

- Histórias da Mulher do Fim do Século
- Falo de Mulher (Talking About a Woman)
- Ao homem que não me quis (To the Man Who Didn't Want Me)
- Cachorros

She has also published several longer works of fiction, including Hotel Novo Mundo (New World Hotel), which was nominated for the Prêmio Jabuti and the Sao Paulo Prize for Literature. Her romance novel Alameda Santos features a protagonist who recounts her experiences into a tape recorder every day. Her works have also featured in literary anthologies.

Leite teaches literary writing workshops.
