= Suzana Montoro =

Brazilian writer

Suzana Montoro (born 1957) is a Brazilian writer and psychologist. She was born in São Paulo. She is best known for her 2011 novel Os hungareses which won the São Paulo Prize for Literature. She has also published children's books (O Menino das Chuvas, Em busca da sombra and Nem eu nem outro) and short stories (Exilados and Travessias).
