= Marcus Freitas =

- Born: 1959 (age 66–67); Belo Horizonte, Brazil
- Education: Federal University of Minas Gerais; Brown University
- Occupations: writer, poet, literary scholar
- Employer: Federal University of Minas Gerais

Marcus Freitas (born 1959) is a Brazilian writer, poet and literary scholar. He was born in Belo Horizonte in 1959. He graduated from UFMG, before earning a PhD at Brown University. The subject of his thesis was the naturalist Charles Frederick Hartt; it was later published in book form and won the Premio Jabuti. His debut novel Peixe Morto was nominated for the Sao Paulo Literary Prize.

Freitas teaches at UFMG.
