= José Renato Nalini =

Brazilian judge

- Nalini in 2018

Secretary of Education of the State of São Paulo
- In office 28 January 2016 – 13 April 2018
- Governor: Geraldo Alckmin; Márcio França
- Preceded by: Herman Voorwald
- Succeeded by: João Cury

President of the Justice Court of São Paulo
- In office 2 February 2014 – 5 January 2016
- Vice President: Eros Piceli
- Preceded by: Ivan Sartori
- Succeeded by: Paulo Dimas de Bellis Mascaretti

Personal details
- Born: 24 December 1945 (age 80) Jundiaí, São Paulo, Brazil
- Education: Pontifical Catholic University of São Paulo (LL.B.); University of São Paulo (LL.M., J.D.)

José Renato Nalini (born 24 December 1945 in Jundiaí) is a Brazilian jurist, professor, writer, magistrate and politician. He served as desembargador of the Justice Court of São Paulo, where he also served as President, and Secretary of Education of São Paulo.

== Career ==
Nalini graduated as Bachelor of Laws at the Pontifical Catholic University of São Paulo in 1971. He also became Master and Doctor of constitutional law at the University of São Paulo in 1992 and 2000, respectively.

He served as district attorney of the Public Prosecutor's Office of São Paulo from 1973 to 1976, when he joined the magistrate career as law judge. Nalini was promoted to judge of the Criminal Court of São Paulo in 1993 and became desembargador of the Justice Court of São Paulo in 2004. Served as Inspector-General of Justice of the State of São Paulo from 2012 to 2013 and President of the Court from 2014 to 2015, when he retired.

Nalini served also as President of the Paulista Academy of Letters.

After retiring as desembargador, he was nominated in January 2016 as Secretary of Education of the State of São Paulo by Governor Geraldo Alckmin, more than 40 days after the leaving of Herman Voorwald, who resigned due to the suspension of the school reorganization process. He left the office on 13 April 2018, after Alckmin's resign.

On 9 December 2010, Nalini was awarded with the Grand Officer grade of the Order of Ipiranga by the Government of São Paulo.

On 4 June 2018, he was awarded with the Commander grade of the Order of Merit of Portugal.

=== Controversies ===
In 2003, while President of the extinct Criminal Court, he conceded a habeas corpus to Gugu Liberato, so he wouldn't be indicted of press crime and threat in the interview with fake members of the First Command of the Capital.

In interview to Jornal da Cultura in 2014, desembargador Nalini, commenting on the budget forecast of R$ 1 billion (approximately US$425.5 million in 2014) for the concession of housing assistance for judges, acknowledged that the assistance "disguises a subsidy increase" and affirmed that the measure would be justifiable because, among other reasons, the judges need to buy many suits and "[we] can't go to Miami every time to buy suits". The statement gained negative repercussion.

On 5 April 2016, Secretary Nalini published a controverse open letter to the Secretariat of Education website, "The Orphan Society", where he states that education shouldn't be a basic right secured by the State. In the text, the Secretary explicits his view of market and society, putting himself on the right-wing of the political spectrum and choosing the economic liberalism as an ideal (notion that the State should only provide security and justice). Nalini was mediator between students and the State, giving continuity to the reorganization of the public education, now listening to the opinion of the students and community, as promised by Alckmin for 2016.

Honorary titles
Preceded by Duílio Crispim Farina	2nd Academic of the 40th Chair of the Paulista Academy of Letters; 2003–present	Incumbent
Legal offices
Preceded by Ivan Sartori	President of the Justice Court of São Paulo; 2014–15	Succeeded by Paulo Dimas de Bellis Mascaretti
Political offices
Preceded by Herman Voorwald	Secretary of Education of the State of São Paulo; 2016–18	Succeeded by João Cury
