= Andréa del Fuego =

Brazilian writer

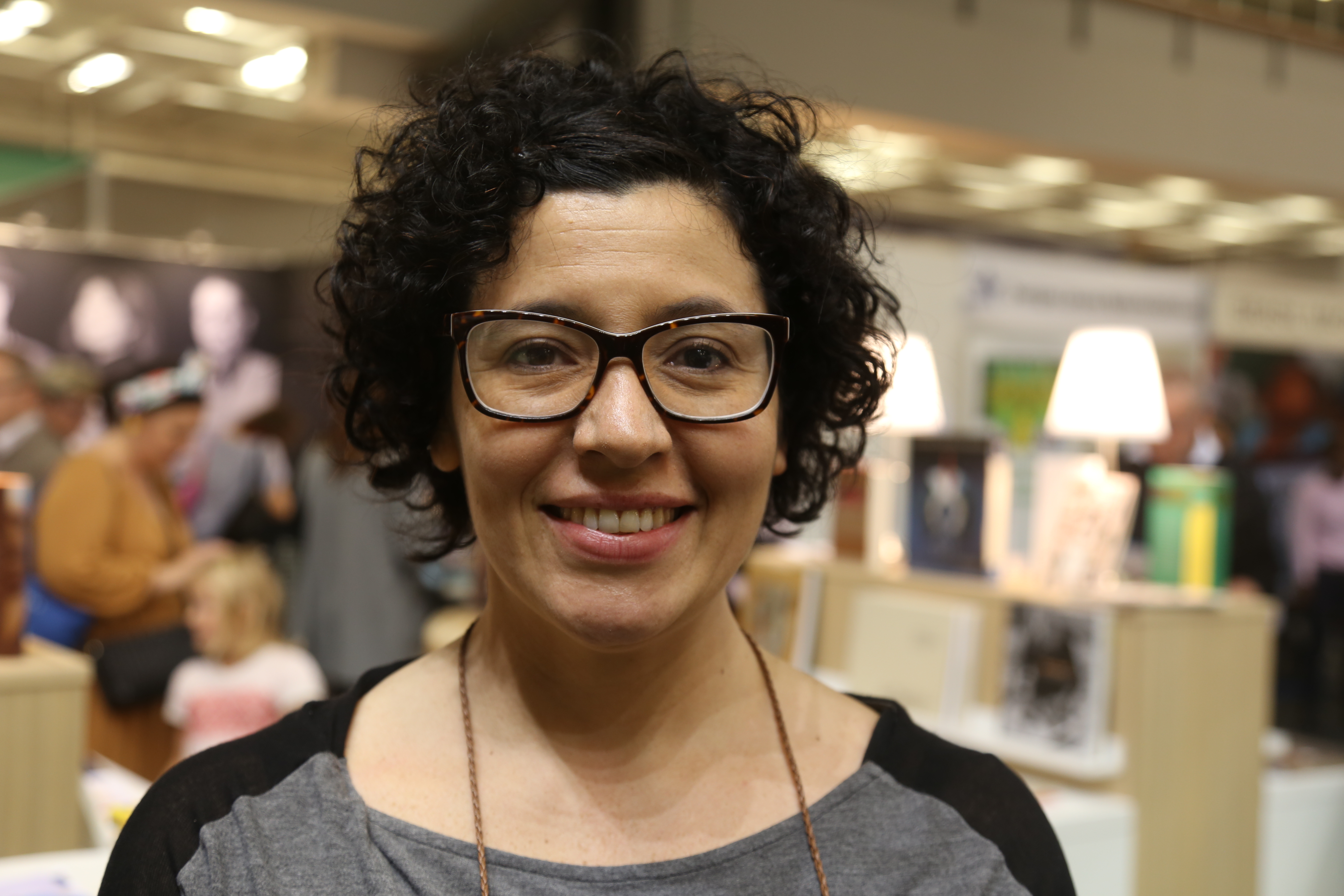
Andréa del Fuego at the Gothenburg Book Fair, 2014.

Andréa del Fuego, pen name of Andréa Fátima dos Santos (born 1975) is a Brazilian writer.

== Biography ==
Andréa del Fuego was born in the city of São Paulo in 1975. Graduated in Philosophy from the University of São Paulo, she is the author of novels, short stories and young adult books. At the beginning of her career, in 1998, Andréa wrote crônicas and answered sexual questions from the readers of the magazine of the radio station 89 FM. She then created her pseudonym, a reference to Luz del Fuego.

She participated then in several short story anthologies. Her first novel, Os Malaquias, was published in 2010 and tells the story of three siblings who are orphaned when their parents are struck by lightning. For this book del Fuego won the 2011 José Saramago Prize.

== Published works ==
=== Novels ===
- 2010 – Os Malaquias (Língua geral)
- 2013 – As Miniaturas (Companhia das Letras)
- 2021 – A Pediatra (Companhia das Letras)

=== Short stories ===
- 2004 – Minto enquanto posso (Ed. O Nome da Rosa)
- 2005 – Nego tudo (Fina Flor)
- 2007 – Engano seu (Ed. O Nome da Rosa)
- 2009 – Nego fogo (Dulcinéia Catadora)

=== Young adult books ===
- 2007 – Blade Runner (Mojo Books)
- 2008 – Quase caio (Escala Educacional)
- 2008 – Crônica (Editora Escala Educacional)
- 2013 – Sociedade da Caveira de Cristal (Scipione)

=== Children's books ===
- 2010 – Irmãs de pelúcia (Scipione)

=== Anthologies ===
- Os cem menores contos brasileiros do século (Ateliê Editorial, Org. Marcelino Freire, 2004)
- 30 mulheres que estão fazendo a nova literatura brasileira (Editora Record Org. Luiz Ruffato, 2005)
- Geração zero zero (Editora Língua Geral, Org. Nelson de Oliveira, 2011)
- Escritores escritos (Editora Flaneur, Org. Victoria Saramago, 2010)
- Galeria do sobrenatural (Terracota Editorial, Org. Silvio Alexandre, 2009)
- 90-00 Cuentos brasileños contemporáneos (Ediciones Copé, selo editorial da Petroperu – Org. Maria Alzira Brum Lemos e Nelson de Oliveira; translated by Alan Mills e José Luis Sansáns, 2009, Peru)
- Futuro presente (Editora Record, Org.Nelson de Oliveira, 2009)
- Um rio de contos – antologia luso-brasileira (Editorial Tágide – Org. Celina Veiga de Oliveira e Victor Oliveira Mateus, 2009, Portugal)
- O livro vermelho dos vampiros (Editora Devir – Org. Luiz Roberto Guedes, 2009)
- Blablablogue (Editora Terracota – Organização de Nelson de Oliveira, 2009)
- O Pequeno Príncipe me disse (Editora Luk – Organização de Sheila Dryzun, 2009)
- Pitanga – 52 micro-contos (Editorial Pitanga – Organização de Luísa Coelho, 2008, Portugal)
- Capitu mandou flores (Geração Editorial – Organização de Rinaldo de Fernandes, 2008)
- Contos de algibeira (Casa verde – Organização de Lais Chaffe, 2007)
- 35 segredos para chegar a lugar nenhum (Bertrand Brasil – Organização de Ivana Arruda Leite, 2007)
- 69/2 contos eróticos (Editora Leitura – Organização de Ronald Claver, 2006)
- Doze (Editora Demônio Negro – Organização de Vanderley Mendonça, 2006)
- Fábulas da Mercearia – uma antologia bêbada (Editora Ciência do Acidente – Org. Joca Reiners Terron, 2004)
