= Menalton Braff =

Brazilian writer

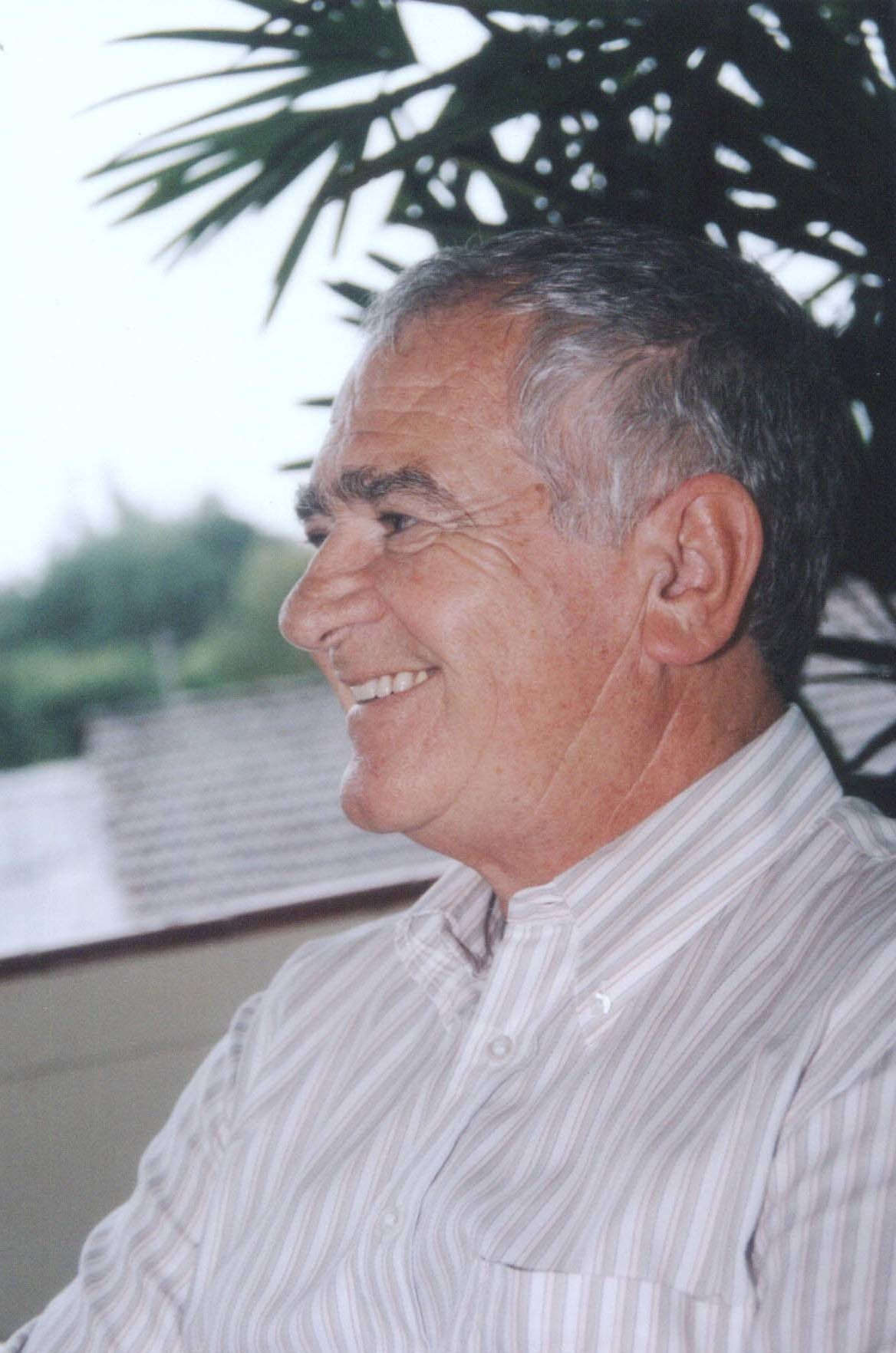
A picture of Menalton Braff

Menalton João Braff (born July 23, 1938) is a Brazilian writer of short stories, novellas and novels.

== Biography ==
Menalton Braff was born in Taquara, a Brazilian municipality in the state of Rio Grande do Sul. His formal education occurred in both Taquara and Porto Alegre, capital of Rio Grande do Sul and one of the top cultural, political and economic centers of the country.

He became interested in literature during his childhood, when he began reading classical authors. He engaged in political activism during his course of Economy in the former Universidade do Rio Grande do Sul and was forced to quit university and disappear as a citizen for a few years due to the military coup of 1964.

It was only after amnesty that Braff could use his real name again. In São Paulo, at Universidade São Judas Tadeu, Braff started his teaching career. At this time, while finishing a postgraduate course in Brazilian literature, Braff wrote his first novel. His first two books were published under the pen name Salvador dos Passos, which was abandoned in 1999 when he published À Sombra do Cipreste. This short story book would win the Prêmio Jabuti for Literature in 2000.

He worked as a teacher and professor of Brazilian literature in Catanduva, Batatais, Ribeirão Preto, Ituverava and other regional cities. Braff married Roseli Deienno, who studied at the same university where he worked in São Paulo, and they moved to the interior of the State. Braff was the winner of Prêmio Jabuti de Literatura in 2000 with À Sombra do Cipreste.

== Literary style ==
Braff's prose is best known for its literary impressionism and tendencies for lyrical or poetic narratives. In an interview, the author himself acknowledges: “My general tendency is for Impressionism. I feel deeply attracted to the paintings of the movement, its suggestion, its unfinished aspect; that is, a world in constant construction.” (BELEBONI, 2007).

In this sense, his works generally offer moments of impressions that compose experience instead of focusing on a realist image of a whole. His narrators prefer to suggest sensations and thus take part in an attempt to capture the moment, the fragmentary, the subjective. Stream of consciousness, for instance, is one of the techniques employed to highlight the ideas of disconnection and linear rupture.

Braff's literary inclination to the lyrical novel is based structurally on rhythmic patterns such as rhymes and alliteration. On the thematic and plot spheres, his narratives focus mainly the human condition through the projection of the inner life of either the narrator or the characters as well as the search for identity and existential meaning.

In addition, some works briefly draw attention to the social and historical aspect of fiction, such as O Casarão da Rua do Rosário (2012), a novel related to the Brazilian military government. This possible association, however, is shaped secondarily and is subordinate to the focus on language. It is also possible to study, in this sense, the social aspects “present in the internal structures of Braff’s narrative.” (COSTA E SILVA, 2011).

== Bibliography ==
=== As Salvador dos Passos ===
- Janela Aberta (1984) – novel
- Na Força de Mulher (1984) – short stories book

=== As Menalton Braff ===
==== Short stories books ====
- À Sombra do Cipreste (1999)
- A Coleira no Pescoço (2006)

==== Children’s and young-adult novellas ====
- A Esperança por Um Fio (2003)
- Como Peixe no Aquário (2004)
- Gambito (2005)
- Antes da Meia Noite (2008)
- Copo Vazio (2010)
- No Fundo do Quintal (2010)
- Mirinda (2010)
- O fantasma da segundona (2014)
- Castelo de areia (2015)

==== Novels ====
- Que Enchente Me Carrega? (2000)
- Castelos de Papel (2002)
- Na Teia do Sol (2004)
- A Muralha de Adriano (2007)
- Moça com Chapéu de Palha (2009)
- Bolero de Ravel (2010)
- Tapete de Silêncio (2011)
- O Casarão da Rua do Rosário (2012)
- Pouso do Sossego (2014)

== Literary awards and recognition ==
- Winner of Prêmio Jabuti de Literatura in 2000 with À Sombra do Cipreste.
- Finalist of Jornada Nacional de Literatura in 2003 with Castelos de Papel.
- Finalist of Prêmio Jabuti de Literatura in 2007 with A Coleira no Pescoço.
- Finalist of Portugal Telecom Prize for Literature in 2008 with A Muralha de Adriano.
- Finalist of Prêmio Jabuti de Literatura in 2008 with A Muralha de Adriano.
- Finalist of São Paulo Prize for Literature in 2008 with A Muralha de Adriano.
- Honorable mention in Prêmio Casa de las Américas in 2009 for A Muralha de Adriano.
- Finalist of Portugal Telecom Prize for Literature in 2010 with Moça com Chapéu de Palha.
- Copo Vazio was selected by Programa Nacional Biblioteca da Escola (PNBE) in 2010.
- Finalist of São Paulo Prize for Literature in 2011 with Bolero de Ravel.
- Semifinalist of Portugal Telecom Prize for Literature in 2011 with Bolero de Ravel.
- Semifinalist of Portugal Telecom Prize for Literature in 2012 with Tapete de Silêncio.
- Finalist of Prêmio Jabuti de Literatura in 2012 with Tapete de Silêncio.
- Semifinalist of Portugal Telecom Prize for Literature in 2013 with O Casarão da Rua do Rosário.

== Academic works about Menalton Braff ==
- Menalton Braff, leitor de Cecília Meireles
- Traços impressionistas nos contos de Menalton Braff
- Traços impressionistas no conto “O banquete”, de Menalton Braff
- A velhice na modernidade sob o olhar de Menalton Braff
- Saramago, Braff e seus personagens duplos
- “Crispação”: relações entre conto e poesia
- Sutilezas entre o interno e o externo: literatura e sociedade nos contos de Menalton Braff
- Nódoas poéticas e impressionistas em um conto de Menalton Braff
- “Adeus meu pai” e “Os sapatos de meu pai”, de Menalton Braff: um estudo da linguagem impressionista e das imbricações entre texto e contexto
- Tapete de silêncio, de Menalton Braff
