= Bernardo Ajzenberg =

Brazilian journalist, author and translator

Bernardo Ajzenberg (born 1959) is a Brazilian writer and journalist. He was born in São Paulo and studied journalism at the Fundação Cásper Líbero.

His books include:

- Inveja e outras historias
- Gostar de ostras
- Minha vida sem banho
- Olhos secos
- A gaiola de Faraday
- Homens com mulheres
- Carreiras cortadas
- Goldstein & camargo
- Variacoes goldman
- Efeito suspensório

As a translator, he has translated works by Anton Chekhov, Daniel Pennac, Javier Cercas and Alain-Fournier.

As a journalist, he has worked for Brazilian journals such as Última Hora, Transporte Moderno, Veja and Folha de S. Paulo.

In 2003, his book A gaiola de Faraday won the Fiction Prize (Prêmio ABL de Ficção romance teatro e conto) of the Brazilian Academy of Letters.
