= Noemi Jaffe =

Brazilian writer, teacher and literary critic

Noemi Jaffe (born 1962) is a Brazilian writer, teacher, and literary critic.

== Life ==
Noemi Jaffe
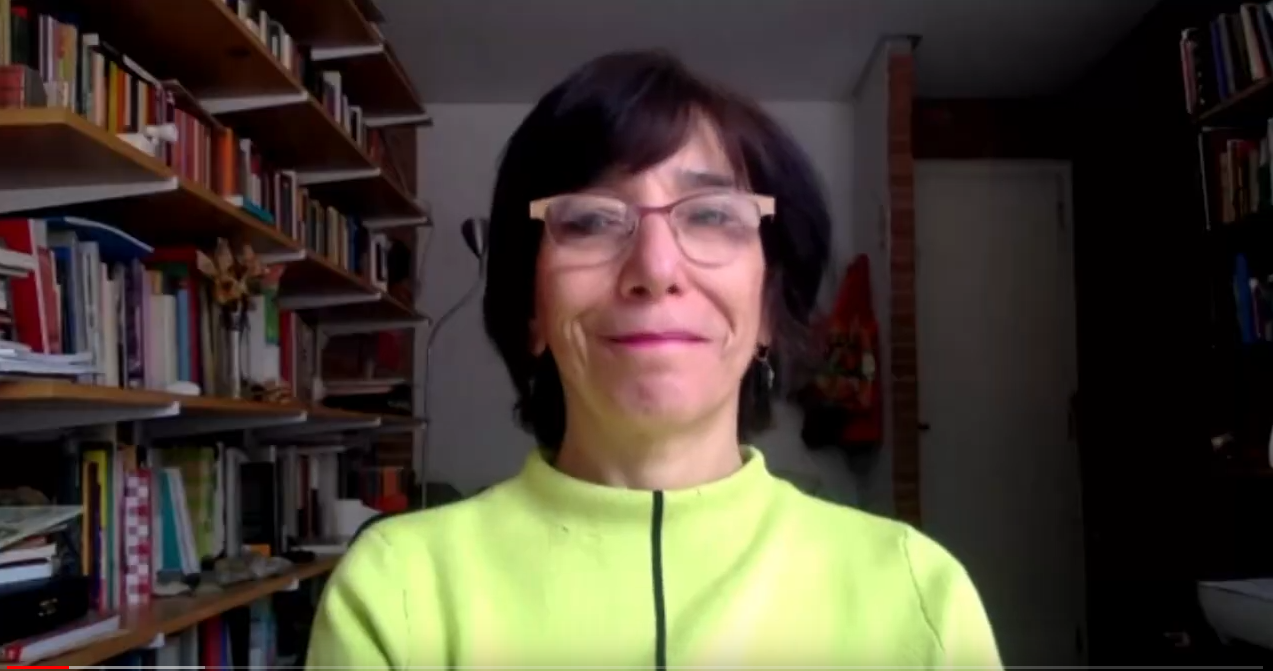
- Noemi Jaffe, in an interview for TV ALERJ's program Perfil, in August 2021
- Born: 1962 (age 63–64); São Paulo, Brazil
- Education: University of São Paulo
- Occupations: novelist; poet; cronista; literary critic

Jaffe was born in 1962 in São Paulo to Serbian Jewish parents and raised in the Bom Retiro neighbourhood. She earned a PhD in Brazilian Literature at the University of São Paulo. Her thesis dealt with Antonio Cicero's poetry.

Jaffe teaches Creative Writing at Casa do Saber, Instituto Vera Cruz, and A Escrevedeira, as well as writing for the newspaper Folha de São Paulo as a literary critic. She gained notoriety in 2005 through publishing a book of poetry. Since its positive reception, she has devoted the majority of her efforts to writing.

Her 2012 book "O que os cegos estão sonhando" (What Are The Blind Men Dreaming) is based on her mother's diary. Jaffe's grandparents were murdered in the Auschwitz concentration camp; her mother survived to write a diary in Sweden that Jaffe and her daughter translated.

Her books have been translated from Portuguese into a dozen languages.

== Published works ==
- Todas as coisas pequenas (Hedra, 2005)
- Quando nada está acontecendo (Martins Fontes, 2011)
- A verdadeira história do alfabeto (Companhia das Letras, 2012)
- O que os cegos estão sonhando? (Editora 34, 2012) - In English: What are the Blind Men Dreaming? (Deep Vellum, 2016)
- Írisz: as orquídeas (Companhia das Letras, 2015)
- O livro dos começos (Cosac Naify, 2016)
- Não está mais aqui quem falou (Companhia das Letras, 2017)
- O que ela sussurra (Companhia das Letras, 2020)
- Lili- Novela de um luto (Companhia das Letras, 2021)
- Te dou minha palavra (Companhia das Letras, 2025)

=== Non-fiction ===
- Folha explica Macunaíma (Publifolha, 2001)
- Ver palavras, ler imagens (Global, 2001)
- Do princípio às criaturas (USP–CAPES, 2008)
- Crônica na sala de aula (Itaú cultural - 2003)
- Escrita em movimento: sete princípios do fazer literário (Companhia das Letras, 2024)
