= Evandro Affonso Ferreira =

Brazilian writer

Evandro Affonso Ferreira (born 1945, Araxá) is a Brazilian writer.

== Life and career ==
Born in Araxá, at the age of 10 he started working at his father's shoe store. Ferreira moved to Brasília in 1959. In 1963 he went to São Paulo with his family, and worked in a bank until 1978. He was an advertising writer until 1990, when he suffered a heart attack and abandoned advertising to dedicate himself to literature.

The following year he opened the Sagarana used bookstore in São Paulo, offering his personal collection of three thousand volumes for sale. He kept the store until 2002. In 2005, he returned to the business, opening the Avalovara bookstore.

His debut as an author with the humor book Bombons Recheados de Cicuta, which he later reneged on. He explored the sound of the Portuguese language, and its intersections with the Tupi-Guarani and the Yoruba languages, in the story books he published in the following years. He won the APCA Award for best romance of 2010 with Minha Mãe se Matou Sem Dizer Adeus and the 2013 Jabuti Award with O Mendigo que Sabia de Cor os Adágios de Erasmo de Rotterdam

== Works ==
=== Short stories ===
- 1996 - Bombons Recheados de Cicuta (Paulicéia)
- 2000 - Grogotó! (Topbooks)

=== Novels ===
- 2002 - Araã! (Hedra)
- 2004 - Erefuê (Editora 34)
- 2005 - Zaratempô! (Editora 34)
- 2006 - Catrâmbias! (Editora 34)
- 2010 - Minha Mãe se Matou Sem Dizer Adeus (Record)
- 2012 - O Mendigo que Sabia de Cor os Adágios de Erasmo de Rotterdam (Record)
- 2014 - Os Piores Dias de Minha Vida Foram Todos (Record)
- 2016 - Não tive nenhum prazer em conhecê-los (Record)
- 2017 - "Nunca houve tanto fim como agora" (Record)
- 2019 - Moça Quase-viva Enrodilhada Numa Amoreira Quase-morta (Editora Nós)

== Awards ==
- 2010 - Prêmio APCA - Best Novel (Minha Mãe se Matou Sem Dizer Adeus)
- 2013 - Prêmio Jabuti - Winner (O Mendigo que Sabia de Cor os Adágios de Erasmo de Rotterdam)
- 2018 - Prêmio Biblioteca Nacional - Best Novel (Nunca Houve Tanto Fim Como Agora)
