= Joca Reiners Terron =

Brazilian poet, novelist, designer and editor

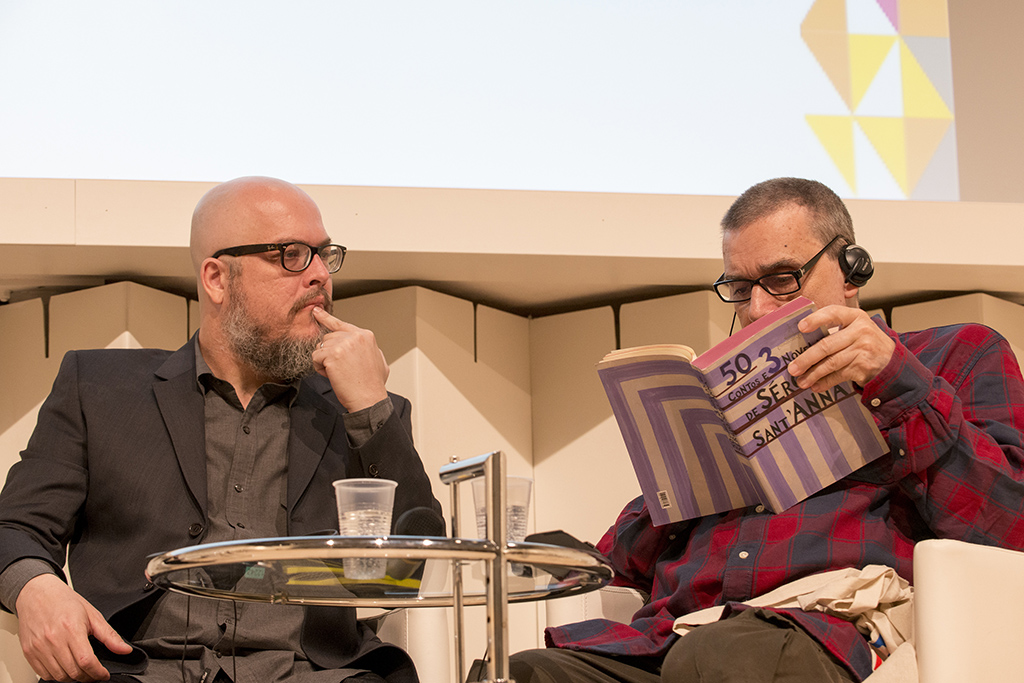
Joca Reiners Terron (left) and Sérgio Sant'Anna at the Frankfurt Book Fair (2013)

João Carlos Reiners Terron (born 9 February 1968), writing as Joca Reiners Terron, is a Brazilian poet, novelist, designer and editor.

== Biography ==
Terron was born in Cuiabá, in 1968. He studied Architecture at UFRJ and studied Industrial Design at UNESP. He has been living in São Paulo since 1995.

He was the founder and editor of the independent publishing house Ciência do Acidente. His works appeared on several anthologies published in Brazil and abroad, such as Geração 90: os transgressores (Boitempo, 2003), Os Cem Menores Contos Brasileiros do Século (Ateliê Editorial, 2004), Dentro de um livro (Casa da Palavra, 2005), A Literatura latino-americana do século XXI (Aeroplano Editora/Centro Cultural Banco do Brasil, 2005), Contos Cruéis: as narrativas mais violentas da literatura brasileira contemporânea (Geração Editorial, 2006), Rattapalax and McSweeneys 46: The Latin American Crime Issue (2014).

In 2013, Terron organized the collection Otra Língua, by Rocco publishing house, which launched Latin American authors who were previously unpublished in Brazil, such as Mario Levrero, Horacio Castellanos Moya, and Cesar Aira.

His 2017 book, Noite dentro da Noite (Night within the Night), was a finalist for the Jabuti Prize for Literature in the Romance category.

== Works ==
=== Novels ===
- Não há nada lá (Ciência do Acidente, 2001; Companhia das Letras, 2011)
- Curva de Rio Sujo (Planeta, 2004) (adapted into film by Felipe Bragança)
- Do fundo do poço se vê a lua (Companhia das Letras, 2010)
- Guia de ruas sem saída – Bolsa Petrobrás de fomento à Criação Literária. Illustrations by André Ducci, (selo editorial Edith, 2012)
- A tristeza extraordinária do Leopardo-das-Neves (Companhia das Letras, 2013)
- Noite Dentro da Noite (Companhia das Letras, 2017)
- A Morte e o Meteoro (Companhia das Letras, 2019)
- O Riso dos Ratos (Todavia, 2021)
- Onde pastam os minotauros (Todavia, 2023)

=== Short stories ===
- Hotel Hell (Livros do Mal, 2003)
- Sonho interrompido por guilhotina (Casa da Palavra, 2006)

=== Poetry ===
- Eletroencefalodrama (Ciência do Acidente, 1998)
- Animal anônimo (Ciência do Acidente, 2002)
- Transportuñol borracho (Yiyi Jambo, Asunción, 2008)

=== Stage plays ===
- Cedo ou tarde tudo morre – dirigida por Haroldo Rego e encenada no projeto Nova Dramaturgia Brasileira (CCBB Brasília – maio/2011).
- Bom Retiro 958 Metros – com Teatro da Vertigem, direção de Antônio Araújo, encenada em São Paulo entre junho de 2012 e abril de 2013.}

== Awards ==
- Prêmio Redescoberta da Literatura Brasileira da Revista Cult por "Não Há Nada Lá" (2000).
- Bolsa para autores com obra em conclusão da Fundação Biblioteca Nacional (2002).
- Bolsa Petrobras de Criação Literária por "Guia de Ruas Sem Saída" (2007).
- Prêmio Machado de Assis de Romance da Fundação Biblioteca Nacional por Do fundo do poço se vê a lua (Companhia das Letras, 2010).
- Menção Honrosa na categoria Contos por "A Memória é uma Curva de Rio Sujo" – Concurso Nacional de Literatura Cidade de Belo Horizonte.
