= New Vessel Press =

Media House

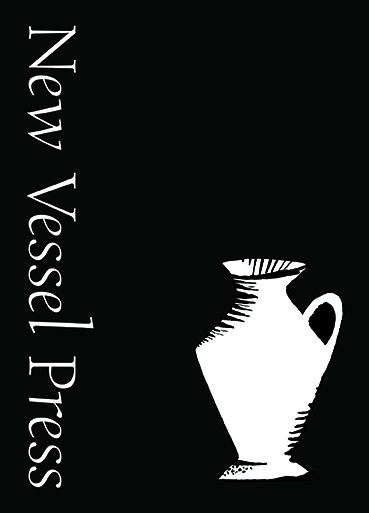
- Founded: 2012
- Country of origin: United States
- Headquarters location: New York, New York
- Distribution: Consortium Book Sales & Distribution (US); Turnaround Publisher Services (UK)
- Key people: Ross Ufberg; Michael Z. Wise
- Publication types: Books
- Fiction genres: Literary translation
- Official website: www.newvesselpress.com

New Vessel Press is an American independent publishing house specializing in the translation of foreign literature and narrative nonfiction into English.

New Vessel Press books have been reviewed in The New York Times, The Wall Street Journal, The New York Review of Books, and O, The Oprah Magazine. What's Left of the Night, a novel about the poet C.P. Cavafy by Ersi Sotiropoulou and translated from the Modern Greek by Karen Emmerich, won the 2019 National Translation Award in Prose. The Words That Remain, a Brazilian novel about the scars left by poverty, illiteracy, and homophobia, by Stênio Gardel and translated from the Portuguese by Bruna Dantas Lobato, won the 2023 National Book Award for Translated Literature.

The Remembered Soldier, a Dutch novel about a World War I soldier who has lost his memory, by Anjet Daanje and translated by David McKay, was longlisted for 2026 International Booker Prize and was a finalist for the 2025 National Book Award for Translated Literature.

== History ==
New Vessel Press was co-founded by writer/translator Ross Ufberg and author/journalist Michael Z. Wise in 2012, with the intention of bringing foreign literature to English-speaking audiences. Its first books were published in 2013.

New Vessel Press books are distributed to bookstores and online vendors throughout the United States by Consortium Book Sales & Distribution; they are distributed in Canada by Publishers Group Canada and in the United Kingdom and Ireland by Turnaround Publisher Services. All NVP titles are also available as ebooks and many as audiobooks.

== Artwork ==
Book covers for New Vessel Press translations have been created by graphic artist Liana Finck and Beth Steidle.

== List of works ==
Fall 2013/Winter 2014

- The Good Life Elsewhere by Vladimir Lorchenkov
- Cocaine by Pitigrilli
- Killing the Second Dog by Marek Hlasko
- Fanny von Arnstein: Daughter of the Enlightenment by Hilde Spiel
- Some Day by Shemi Zarhin
- The Missing Year of Juan Salvatierra by Pedro Mairal

Fall 2014/Winter 2015

- I Called Him Necktie by Milena Michiko Flašar
- Who is Martha? by Marjana Gaponenko
- Guys Like Me by Dominique Fabre
- All Backs Were Turned by Marek Hlasko

Spring 2015 Fall 2014/Winter 2015

- Alexandrian Summer by Yitzhak Gormezano Goren
- Killing Auntie by Andrzej Bursa

Fall 2015/Winter 2016

- Oblivion by Sergei Lebedev
- The 6:41 to Paris by Jean-Philippe Blondel
- On the Run with Mary by Jonathan Barrow
- The Last Weynfeldt by Martin Suter
- Animal Internet by Alexander Pschera
- The Last Supper by Klaus Wivel

Fall 2016/Winter 2017

- If Venice Dies by Salvatore Settis
- Year of the Comet by Sergei Lebedev
- Moving the Palace by Charif Majdalani
- The Madonna of Notre Dame by Alexis Ragougneau
- A Very Russian Christmas: The Greatest Russian Holiday Stories of All Time
- Adua by Igiaba Scego

2017/2018

- The Madeleine Project by Clara Beaudoux
- A Very French Christmas: The Greatest French Holiday Stories of All Time
- The Animal Gazer by Edgardo Franzosini
- Neapolitan Chronicles by Anna Maria Ortese
- Allmen and the Dragonflies by Martin Suter
- The Eye: An Insider's Memoir of Masterpieces, Money, and the Magnetism of Art by Philippe Costamagna

2018/2019

- What's Left of the Night by Ersi Sotiropoulos
- A Very Italian Christmas: The Greatest Italian Holiday Stories of All Time
- Allmen and the Pink Diamond by Martin Suter
- The Goose Fritz by Sergei Lebedev
- Sleepless Night by Margriet de Moor
- Exposed by Jean-Philippe Blondel

2019/2020

- The Bishop's Bedroom by Piero Chiara
- And the Bride Closed the Door by Ronit Matalon
- A Very Scandinavian Christmas: The Greatest Nordic Holiday Stories of All Time
- The Drive by Yair Assulin
- Villa of Delirium by Adrien Goetz
- I Belong to Vienna by Anna Goldenberg

2020/2021

- The Piano Student by Lea Singer
- A Very German Christmas: The Greatest Austrian, Swiss and German Holiday Stories of All Time
- Untraceable by Sergei Lebedev
- Roundabout of Death by Faysal Khartash
- Distant Fathers by Marina Jarre

2021/2022

- The Vanished Collection by Pauline Baer de Perignon
- A Very Irish Christmas: The Greatest Irish Holiday Stories of All Time
- Pollak's Arm by Hans von Trotha
- Palace of Flies by Walter Kappacher
- A Few Collectors by Pierre Le-Tan
- Of Saints and Miracles by Manuel Astur

2022/2023

- A Very Mexican Christmas: The Greatest Mexican Holiday Stories of All Time
- The Words That Remain by Stênio Gardel
- Return to Latvia by Marina Jarre
- A Present Past: Titan and Other Chronicles by Sergei Lebedev
- Professor Schiff's Guilt by Agur Schiff
- Where I Am by Dana Shem-Ur
- Café Unfiltered by Jean-Philippe Blondel
- One for Each Night: The Greatest Chanukah Stories of All Time

2024/2025

- The Hebrew Teacher by Maya Arad
- A Very Indian Christmas: The Greatest Indian Holiday Stories of All Time
- The Propagandist by Cécile Desprairies
- The Lady of the Mine by Sergei Lebedev
- Ugliness by Moshtari Hilal
- The Remembered Soldier by Anjet Daanje

2025/2026

- Happy New Years by Maya Arad
- A Very Brazilian Christmas: The Greatest Brazilian Holiday Stories of All Time
- A Fictional Inquiry by Daniele Del Giudice
- There's No Point in Dying by Francisco Maciel
- My Dreadful Body by Egana Djabbarova
- House Arrest by Noa Yedlin
- Botany of Madness by Leon Engler
