= Bruna Dantas Lobato =

Brazilian-American writer and translator

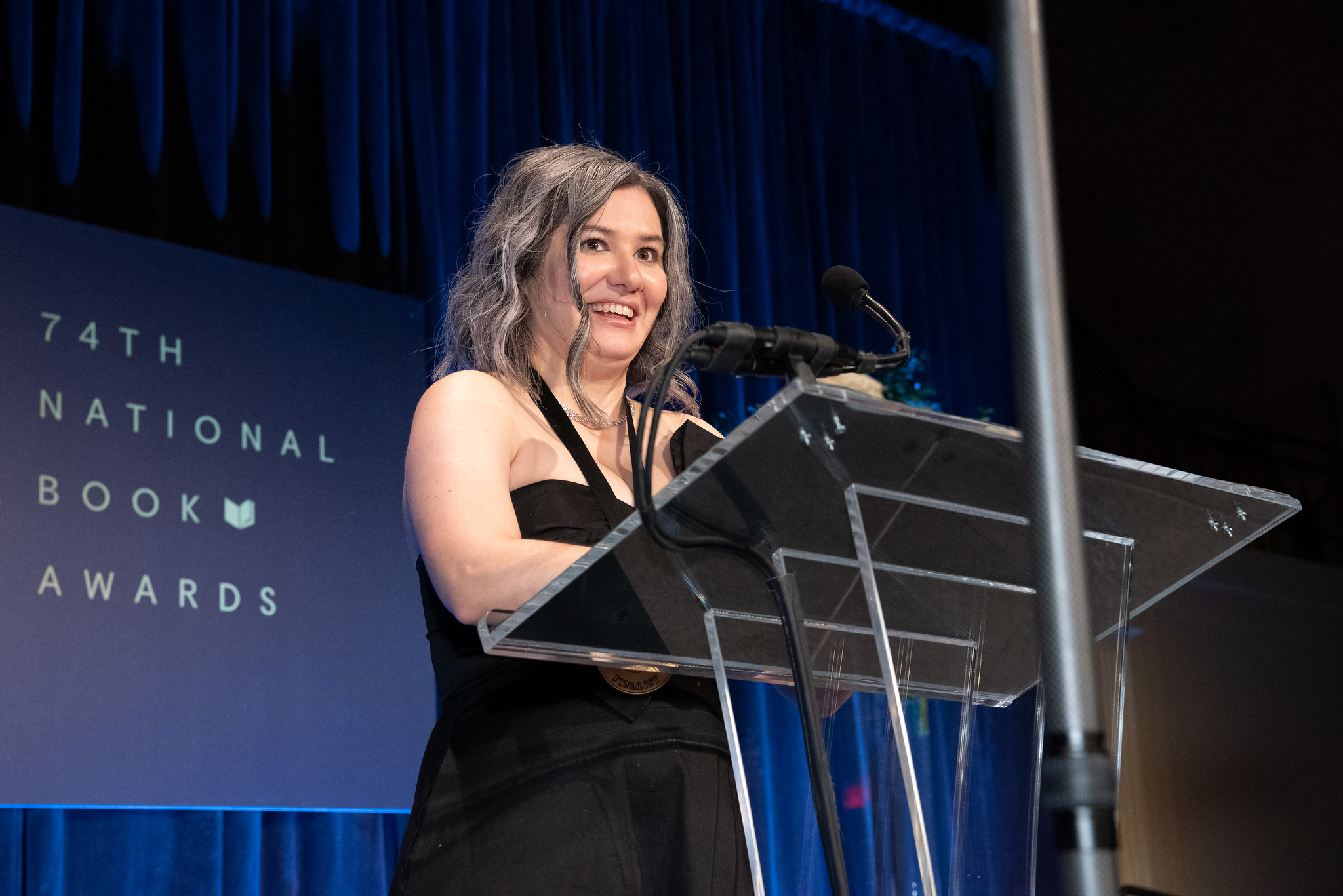
- Bruna Dantas Lobato in 2023
- Born: c. 1991; Natal, Rio Grande do Norte, Brazil
- Education: New York University (MFA); University of Iowa (MFA); Bennington College (BA)
- Occupations: Writer; translator
- Writing career
- Notable awards: National Book Award
- Website: brunadantaslobato.com

Bruna Dantas Lobato is a Brazilian-born fiction writer and translator of Brazilian literature based in the United States.

== Work ==
Her first novel, Blue Light Hours, was published in 2024 by Grove Atlantic in North America and is being published in several other countries. It was a finalist for the 2025 Janet Heidinger Kafka Prize and longlisted for the Mark Twain American Voice in Literature Award. It received praise from The New York Times, The Atlantic, and Ms., among others, as well as starred reviews from Kirkus Reviews and Library Journal. The novel was expanded from a story originally published in The New Yorker. Her other stories have been published in Guernica, A Public Space, and The Common.

The Portuguese-language edition was published in Brazil by Companhia das Letras and in Portugal by Penguin Livros in the author's own translation with the title Horas azuis. It was a finalist for the 2026 Jabuti Prize, a semi-finalist for the 2026 Oceanos Prize, and selected as one of the "Best Books of 2025" by Folha de S. Paulo.

Her translation of The Words That Remain by Stênio Gardel won the 2023 National Book Award for Translated Literature. Her translation of The Dark Side of Skin by Jeferson Tenório won an English PEN Translates Award, and her translation of Moldy Strawberries by Caio Fernando Abreu was longlisted for the PEN Translation Prize and the Republic of Consciousness Prize US and Canada. Her translation of The Tokyo Suite by Giovana Madalosso was a New York Times "Notable Book of 2025" and an NPR "Best Book of 2025."

In addition to translating Brazilian literature into English, Dantas Lobato is an advocate for translators translating out of their heritage languages and has led panels on the topic. She is bilingual and primarily writes in English, her second language.

Dantas Lobato served on the board of directors of the American Literary Translators Association from 2021 to 2024. She was formerly a visiting faculty member at Bennington College. She is currently an assistant professor of English and creative writing at Grinnell College.

== Early life and education ==
Dantas Lobato was born and raised in Natal, in the Northeast of Brazil. As a low-income high school student, she was selected by the United States Department of State and U.S. Embassy for the Brazil exchange program Youth Ambassadors, which first brought her to the United States to study U.S. politics and youth leadership. As a Youth Ambassador to Brazil, Dantas Lobato visited the White House, where she met Michelle Obama.

She has an MFA in Creative Writing from New York University, an MFA in Literary Translation from the University of Iowa, and a BA in Literature from Bennington College. She attended high school at the Federal Institute of Education, Science and Technology of Rio Grande do Norte.

== Honors ==
Award	Year	Category	Nominated work	Result	Ref.
PEN/Heim Translation Fund Grants	2019		Moldy Strawberries by Caio Fernando Abreu	Won	
Republic of Consciousness Prize US and Canada	2022		Moldy Strawberries by Caio Fernando Abreu	Longlisted	
PEN Translation Prize	2023		Moldy Strawberries by Caio Fernando Abreu	Longlisted	
English PEN Translates Award	2023		The Dark Side of Skin by Jeferson Tenório	Won	
National Book Award	2023	Translated Literature	The Words That Remain by Stênio Gardel	Won	
Dublin Literary Award	2024		The Words That Remain by Stênio Gardel	Nominated	
Janet Heidinger Kafka Prize	2025		Blue Light Hours by Bruna Dantas Lobato	Shortlisted	
Mark Twain American Voice in Literature Award	2025		Blue Light Hours by Bruna Dantas Lobato	Longlisted	
Dublin Literary Award	2026		The Tokyo Suite by Giovana Madalosso	Nominated	
Oceanos Prize	2026	Prose	Blue Light Hours by Bruna Dantas Lobato	Longlisted	
Jabuti Prize	2026	Debut novelist	Blue Light Hours by Bruna Dantas Lobato	Shortlisted	

== Selected publications ==
=== Fiction ===
- "Firsthand Account" (The Common, 2017)
- "Diversions" (A Public Space, 2018)
- "Reunion" (Guernica, 2022)
- "Snowstorm" (The New Yorker, 2022)
- Blue Light Hours (Grove Atlantic, 2024)

=== Translations ===
- Moldy Strawberries by Caio Fernando Abreu (Archipelago Books, 2022)
- The Words that Remain by Stênio Gardel (New Vessel Press, 2023)
- The Collector of Heads by Ana Matsusaki (Tapioca Stories, 2023)
- The Dark Side of Skin by Jeferson Tenório (Charco Press, 2024)
- The Tokyo Suite by Giovana Madalosso (Europa Editions, 2025)
- So What If I'm a Puta by Amara Moira (Feminist Press, 2025)
- There's No Point in Dying by Francisco Maciel (New Vessel Press, 2026)
- No Dragons in Paradise by Caio Fernando Abreu (Archipelago Books, 2027)
