= Shem-Ur =

Shem-Ur, also Shem-or (Hebrew: שם אור) is a Hebrew surname. Notable people with the surname include:

- Bar Shem-Ur (born 1989), Israeli journalist, television reporter, and presenter
- Dana Shem-Ur (born 1990), Israeli writer, translator, researcher, and polyglot
- Mirit Shem-Ur (born 1948), Israeli songwriter, journalist, and author
- Ora Shem-Ur (1919–1995), Israeli writer and journalist
- Tamar Shem-Ur (born 1988), Israeli actress
- Yonatan Shem-Ur (born 1950), Israeli journalist, playwright, editor, and writer
