= The 6:41 to Paris =

First edition (French)

The 6:41 to Paris is a short novel by Jean-Philippe Blondel. It was originally published in French as 06H41 by Buchet-Chastel in 2013. This English translation by Alison Anderson was published in 2015 by New Vessel Press.

== Plot summary ==
The 6:41 to Paris is a novel set on a train traveling to present-day Paris told through the individual memories of two characters in a dual narrative. It is an account of a past romance between Cécile Duffaut and Philippe Leduc twenty-seven years ago when the two were both twenty. The two encounter one another unexpectedly on a train for the first time since their breakup, and for most of the hour and a half long ride, they do not speak. Instead, their relationship is retold by the two’s alternating thoughts. Cécile, a now successful businesswoman, recounts their short lived affair with bitterness, even hatred at first. She recalls the party where they slept together that initiated what would become their relationship. In the day following, she treated him with indifference that made him fall for her and, later, reassurance that made him stay. After a few months of weekend rendez-vous, Philippe suggests a getaway to London. It was there that their relationship ended humiliatingly for the naïve, young woman after Philippe brings another woman back to their hotel room. Philippe, lacking the charm that once made him so popular, recalls his mistakes with Cécile during their affair. He realizes that the woman next to him has become more than he once thought she was. To Cécile’s dismay, though, she still carries the emotional baggage. As the ride ends, the two verbally acknowledge one another, and Philippe apologizes for his past, asking if they can meet for coffee. The novel concludes with Cécile deciding to turn around to Philippe as they exit the train.

== Characters ==
=== Cécile Duffaut (Mergey) ===
An elegant forty-seven year old, she is discontent with her personal life but successful in business with her natural beauty line, Pourpre et Lys. She lives just outside of the Paris with her husband, Luc, and her daughter, Valentine. After one of her regular visits to see her elderly parents, Cécile decides on a whim to stay Sunday night with them which puts her on the 6:41 a.m. train on Monday morning.

=== Philippe Leduc ===
Philippe, who works as a TV salesman at a superstore, is the father of two children, Manon and Loïc. He is divorced from his ex-wife Christine. Although he was once popular in his youth, he now spends most of his time alone. Living far outside of Paris, he is only on the 6:41 a.m. train to Paris to visit his friend Mathieu.

=== Luc Mergey ===
Luc is Cécile’s husband, who she describes as nearing fifty and still fit. Cécile feels that their marriage lacks meaningful connection, and that Luc struggles to accept her financial success.

=== Valentine ===
Valentine, almost seventeen, is Cécile and Luc’s daughter.

=== Mathieu ===
Mathieu has been Philippe’s friend since high school and who Philippe is on his way to visit. He experienced moderate success as an actor but is now dying of illness. He had coffee with Cécile not long after Philippe and Cécile’s breakup.

=== Christine ===
Christine is Philippe’s ex-wife and the mother of his children. She left Philippe ten years ago for her first love, Jérôme, after being unhappy for some time.

=== Jérôme ===
He is Christine’s kind and wealthy new husband. Philippe’s children prefer Jérôme’s big house with a pool to their father’s less appealing living conditions.

=== Manone ===
The daughter and oldest child of Philippe, eighteen year old Manon works at an outdoor sports center. She is moving to Reins to study physical therapy.

=== Loïc ===
He is the sixteen year old son of Philippe who wants to take sailing classes over the summer and one day become an orthodontist.

== Themes ==
=== Choice ===
This novel has a heavy emphasis on choice. It opens with Cécile's internal dialogue regarding her decision to take such an early train. She speaks of her uncertainty, doubting everything from that decision to staying an extra night at her parents' to even continuing to visit her parents despite their abrasive nature. Philippe similarly discusses his choice to take the 6:41 a.m. train, saying that the late night ones he hates could have been more convenient. Cécile continues to doubt her past choices, weighing the good and bad that came with dating Philippe. These seemingly insignificant choices are the driving forces of the novel. The choices made in their relationship, those made as they moved on from it, those they make as they share the train ride—each decision has its own impact. In this novel, there is a sense that one is bound by one's choices. Whether in regards to which train to take or with whom to pursue a relationship, there are inevitable consequences that follow, whether intentional or not. The two characters must come to terms with the unexpected consequences of their seemingly insignificant choices. The novel ends when, after much deliberation, Cécile decides to turn around to Philippe as they exit the train. Blondel himself was uncertain as to how to end the novel but chose to give it an open ending the give the reader room to imagine.

=== Aging ===
Much of the novel takes place in the memories Cécile and Philippe have of their youth. They struggle to reconcile who they were and who they are, especially now that they are encountering one another for the first time in twenty-seven years. They remember one another as twenty-year-olds. For Cécile, she immediately feels like an awkward young woman once she realizes she is beside Philippe. When she turns to see Philippe she notes that he is "unrecognizable. . . Wrinkled. Flabby." For her, it was almost satisfying to see the man who had hurt her look so physically worn. She thinks to herself that in a breakup one should get to see a glimpse of what the other person will be like once they have aged. Philippe recalls his youth with guilt, especially in relation to Cécile. Though he knows he was better looking and more charming, he realizes that he treated her poorly. The novel speaks a great deal to how youth is remembered and how it affects one later in life. Cécile's final decision to turn back to Philippe was strongly influenced by her remembrance of the feelings of youth. Philippe ponders the difficulties of the loss of youth, considering it equivalent to the loss of vitality. He feels as though aging is decaying, in the form of his sense of self and relation to others. Cécile associates her age with confidence and stronger identity than ever before. She feels more self-assured in her later years than in her youth, in opposition to Philippe whose peak of self-confidence was long ago. Even in his youth, Philippe was aware that he may not have been making the best choices, but he persisted. Now as he has time to consider his past choices, he feels just as unsure yet less confident.

== Inspiration ==
Though Blondel says that The 6:41 to Paris was not inspired by a specific relationship, he says the idea came from witnessing an encounter at the post office. The man in front of him, trying to send a package, was amazed when the female employee spelled his name perfectly despite it being a complex Polish one. The woman realized that he did not recognize her though they had dated for about three months twenty-five years prior. Blondel's observant tendencies lent themselves to the realistic and detailed nature of the book.

== Publication history ==
The 6:41 to Paris was first published in French as 06H41 in 2013 by Buchet-Chastel. This translation by Alison Anderson was published in 2015 by New Vessel Press. 06H41 has been translated into ten languages so far.

== Critical reception ==
The 6:41 to Paris received high praise from many critics who commented on Blondel's ability to captivate an audience and create a relatable story. The New York Times Sunday Book Review speaks on the accessible depiction of the resurfacing of young love and nearly forgotten memories. Focusing on emotional representations in the novel, Kirkus Reviews writes about Blondel's skill in reminding the reader of the ability of old heartbreaks to rekindle strong feelings. Praising Blondel's skillful, precise writing, World Literature Today highlights the psychological aspects of the novel, which examine the mind's reaction to uncomfortable encounters. The Mountaineer notes that the introspective nature of the novel lends itself to the relatability of it.

Some authors have offered their personal reviews of this novel. Kati Marton, author of Paris: A Love Story, claimed that this book demonstrates the impact that actions in the past have on present experience and describes it as a tense but captivating read. Samantha Vérant, author of Seven Letters from Paris: a Memoir, praises Blondel for his careful depictions of common situations, and deems the novel "unputdownable.”
