= Sotiropoulou =

Sotiropoulou is a Greek surname. Notable people with the surname include:

- Ersi Sotiropoulou (fl. 1999), Greek writer
- Tonia Sotiropoulou (born 1987), Greek actress
