= Maya Arad =

Israeli writer

Maya Arad (Hebrew: מאיה ערד; born January 25, 1971) is an American-based Israeli writer. She is generally considered the "foremost Hebrew writer outside Israel".

== Biography ==
Maya Arad was born in Rishon LeZion in Israel in 1971 and grew up in a kibbutz, Nahal-Oz. At age 11 she returned to her city of birth. Like most Israelis, she served in the Israeli Defense Forces, namely in the Education Corps, where she met her future husband, Reviel Netz, a poet and noted Israeli scholar of the history of pre-modern mathematics, who is currently a professor of Classics and of Philosophy at Stanford University. The couple has two daughters.

Arad is a U.S. citizen, having decided to move away from Israel in 1996 both for professional reasons and out of opposition to the government of Benjamin Netanyahu.

She earned a B.A. in Classics and Linguistics from Tel Aviv University and a Ph.D. in linguistics from University of London. Arad taught at Harvard University, the University of Geneva in Switzerland, and in the theater department at Stanford University. She is a writer-in-residence at the Taube Center for Jewish Studies at Stanford.

== Books ==
Her first novel, Another Place, a Foreign City (Xargol, 2003), written in verse on the model of Eugene Onegin, became a bestseller in Israel and was adapted as a musical play by the Cameri Theater.

In 2005, she published an academic book, Roots and Patterns: Hebrew Morpho-Syntax, a study of the regularity of the Hebrew verb system. The same year she published The Righteous Forsaken, a play in verse, a reimagining of Griboedov’s "Woe from Wit."

Her novel Seven Moral Failings (Xargol, 2006) was another bestseller. Family Pictures (Xargol, 2008) comprises three novellas. Positions of Stress: Essays on Israeli Literature between Sound and History (Ahuzat Bayit, 2008) was written together with Reviel Netz. Her recent publications are also with Xargol: five novels – Short Story Master (2009), Suspected Dementia (2011), The Lady of Kazan (2015), Behind the Mountain (2016), and All about Abigail (2021), as well as a collection of novellas, The Hebrew Teacher (2018). The Hebrew Teacher is the first of Arad's books to appear in English, translated by Jessica Cohen and published by New Vessel Press in March 2024. It won the National Jewish Book Award for Hebrew Fiction in Translation. New Vessel Press published Cohen's translation of Arad's novel Happy New Years in August 2025.
