= Wijster =

- Village
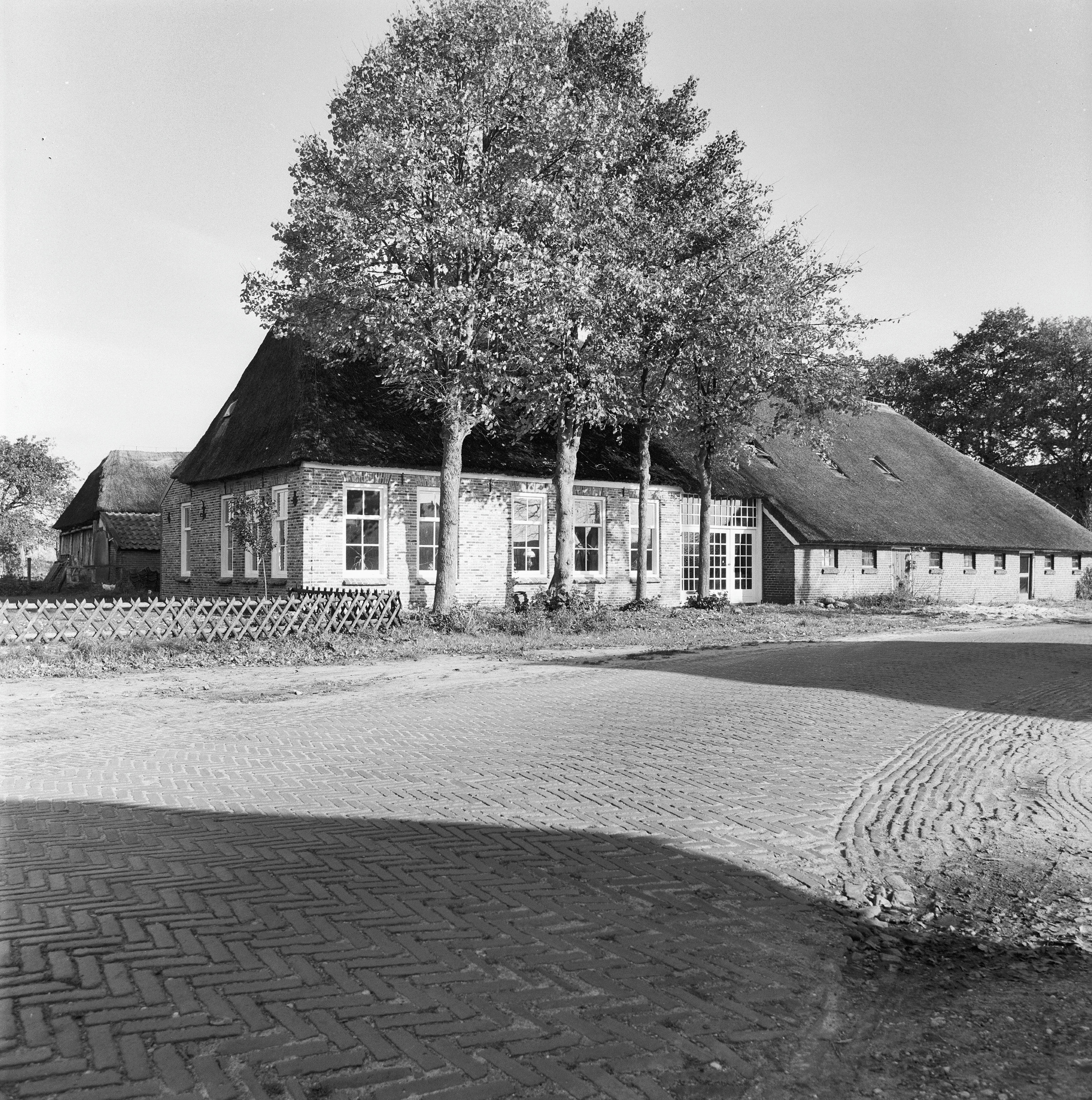
- Farm in Wijster

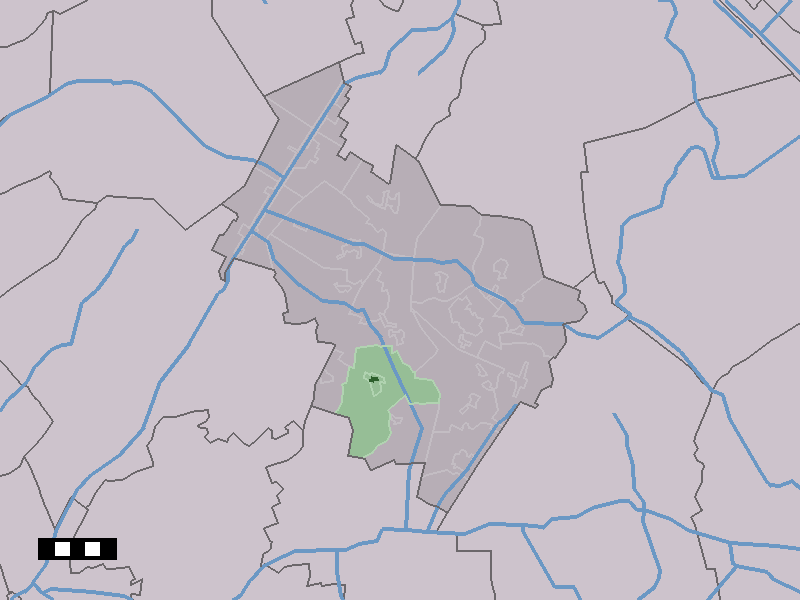
- The town centre (dark green) and the statistical district (light green) of Wijster in the municipality of Midden-Drenthe.

- Location in the Netherlands Wijster (Netherlands)
- Coordinates: 52°48′58″N 6°31′0″E
- Country: Netherlands
- Province: Drenthe
- Municipality: Midden-Drenthe

Area
  - Total: 26.25 km^{2} (10.14 sq mi)
- Elevation: 16 m (52 ft)

Population (2021)
  - Total: 1,085
  - Density: 41.33/km^{2} (107.1/sq mi)
- Time zone: UTC+1 (CET)
  - Summer (DST): UTC+2 (CEST)
- Postal code: 9418
- Dialing code: 0593

Wijster is a village in the Dutch province of Drenthe. It is a part of the municipality of Midden-Drenthe, and lies about 11 km north of Hoogeveen.

== History ==
The village was first mentioned in 1206 as in Wisnare. The etymology is unknown. Wijster is an esdorp which developed in the Early Middle Ages as a satellite of Beilen. It used to have no church, but did have a large funnel shaped brink (village square).

Wijster was home to 300 people in 1840. The Dutch Reformed church dates from 1929 and is a simple church with a little ridge turret.

Wijster is best known for its landfill. From 1929 onwards, garbage was dumped in Wijster, and has resulted in 56 metres (184 ft) high hill.

== 1975 train hostage crisis ==
Wijster was the site of the 1975 Dutch train hostage crisis. In 1949, Indonesia became independent, and the Royal Netherlands East Indies Army was disbanded. The islands of Ambon, Buru, and Seram had fought on side of the Netherlands. They were opposed to a Java-dominated Indonesia, and proclaimed the Republic of South Maluku which resulted in an attack by Indonesia. In 1951, 12,000 refugees from South Maluku were temporarily resettled in the Netherlands. They started to feel betrayed, because it developed into permanent exile.

On 2 December 1975, the train from Groningen to Zwolle stopped in a field near Wijster. Seven South Moluccans had seized the train and killed the driver. The Dutch government was reluctant to negotiate, and the hijackers tried to kill a passenger, however he managed to escape and after being shot at, pretended to be dead. During the twelve days which followed, two more passengers were shot. Johan Manusama, the former president of the Republic of South Maluku, managed to persuade the hijackers to surrender. In 1976, the hijackers were sentenced to 14 year imprisonment.

== Education ==
There is one primary school, Zuiderenk.

== Notable people ==
- Anjet Daanje (born 1965), author
- Nina Gademan (born 2003), racing driver

== Gallery ==
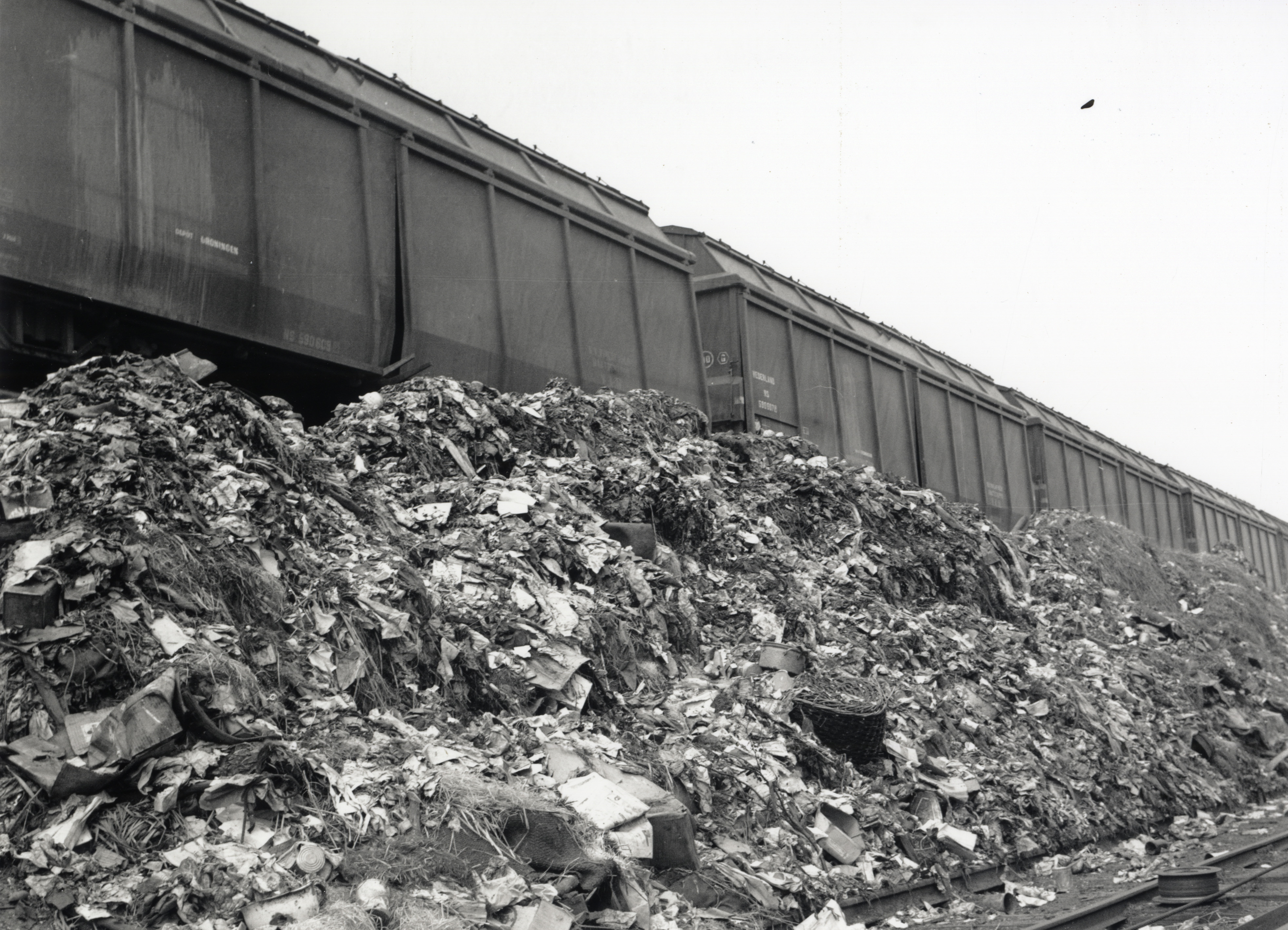
Train unloads its garbage (1954)

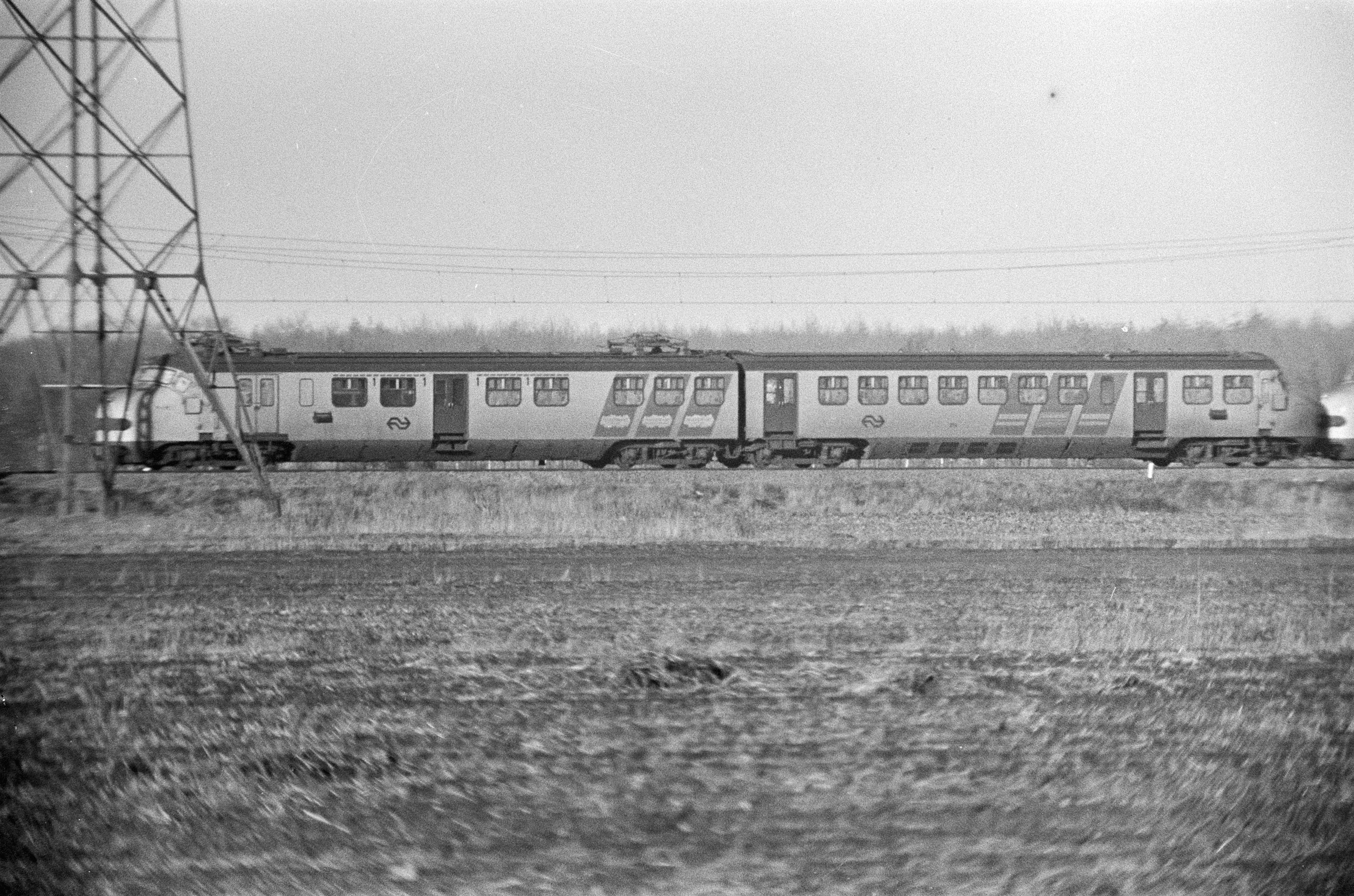
Train hostage crisis of 1975
