= Anjet Daanje =

Dutch writer (born 1965)

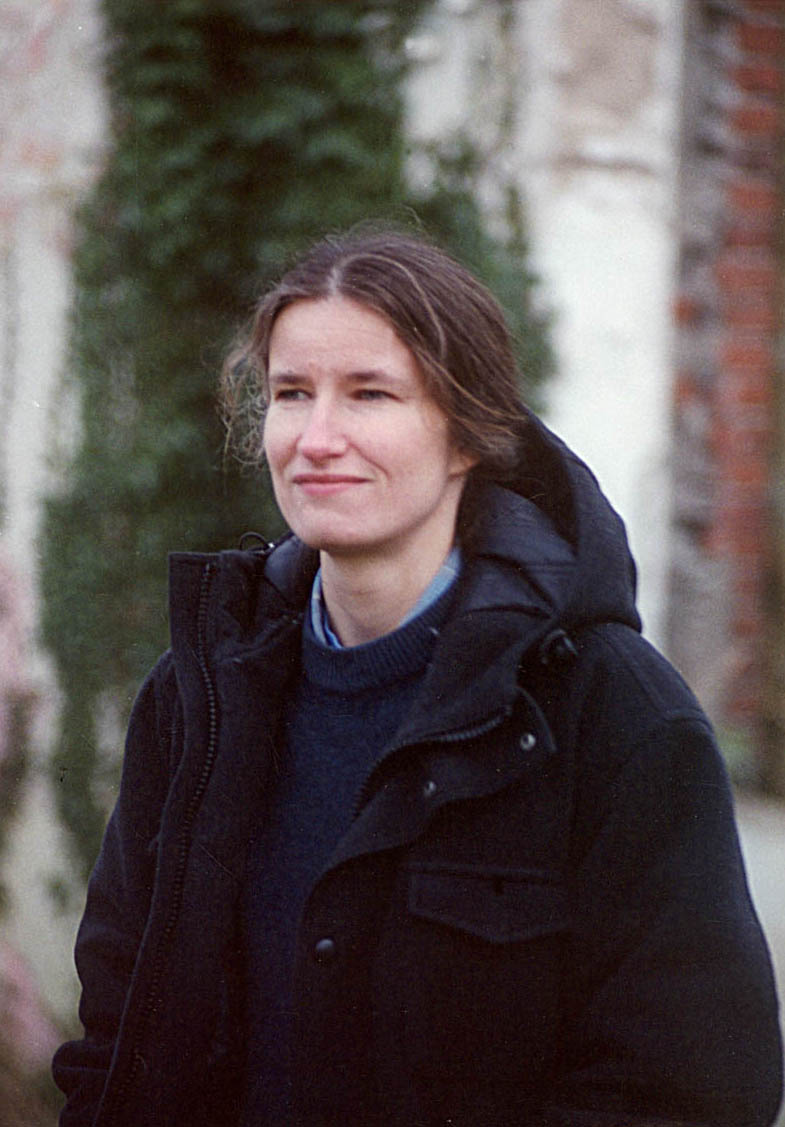
- Anjet Daanje c. 2003
- Born: Anjet den Boer; 1965 (age 60–61); Wijster, the Netherlands
- Writing career
- Notable work: The Remembered Soldier
- Website: anjetdaanje.nl

Anjet den Boer, known under the pen name Anjet Daanje, is a Dutch writer. She is best known for her 2019 novel The Remembered Soldier. She has been nominated for and received multiple literary awards, both in her native Netherlands and abroad.

== Life and career ==
Anjet den Boer was born in Wijster in 1965. She first began to write in high school. She has a brother, Dieb, who is a violist; the two made films together. Daanje went to study mathematics in a university in Utrecht, but kept writing. As of 2026, she has published 10 novels; two of them, The Remembered Soldier and The Song of Stork and Dromedary, have been translated into English.

== The Remembered Soldier ==
Daanje published the novel The Remembered Soldier (Dutch: De herinnerde soldaat) in 2019. The novel was inspired by Anthelme Mangin, a French soldier who suffered amnesia in WWI. Before The Remembered Soldier, she had published 8 novels, but was still an unknown writer. The novel was longlisted for the Libris Prize in 2020; after a review from the NRC, it attracted considerable attention.

The novel concerns a soldier with shell-shock induced amnesia after World War I. After four years in a Ghent Asylum, he is visited by Julienne, who recognises him as her husband, Amand, the father of their two young children. He returns to the family home with her and they work together in their photography business. As Amand's memory gradually returns, he begins to question Julienne's account of their history.

An English translation by David McKay was published in 2025; it was named by The New York Times as one of the 100 most important books of the year. The book was shortlisted in the same year for the National Book Award for Translated Literature. It won the 2025 Republic of Consciousness Prize US and Canada, and was longlisted for the International Booker Prize in 2026.

The Times Literary Supplement called it rich and beguiling and said that "The novel's conspicuous and relentless use of 'and' at the beginning of nearly every paragraph and many of its sentences gives the writing – in translation from the Dutch by David McKay – an undammed quality."

The Financial Times called it extraordinarily vivid, "a novel of epic scope that resonates powerfully" and praised the translation: "David McKay's page-turning translation faithfully conveys the propulsive nature of Daanje's long, sinuous sentences, which multiply the word 'and' to build up streams of thoughts, emotions and dreams."

Kirkus Reviews was more guarded, saying that "It is almost 600 pages of run-on sentences with many including up to 100 words and 10 comma-separated clauses. And the author begins most paragraphs with 'And.' And she buries all dialogue in the narrative." It concluded that it is "An absorbing tale for the patient reader."

In May 2026, a film adaptation of The Remembered Soldier was announced, to be directed by Olivia Newman.

== Selected works in English ==
- The Remembered Soldier (Dutch: De herinnerde soldaat), published by Uitgeverij Passage, 2019, ISBN 978-9-054523-67-3
  - Translated by David McKay, published by New Vessel Press, 2025, ISBN 978-1-954404-32-8
- The Song of Stork and Dromedary (Dutch: Het lied van ooieveaar en dromedaris), published by Uitgeverij Passage, 2022, ISBN 978-0-374620-61-5
  - Translated by David McKay, published by FSG Originals, 2026, ISBN 978-1-915590-80-0

== Accolades ==
- Nominated for the Halewijnprijs for Delle Weel, 2012
- Longlisted for the Libris Prize for The Remembered Soldier, 2020
- Winner of the Ferdinand Bordewijk Prize for The Remembered Soldier, 2021
- Winner of the Bookspot Literatuurprijs for The Song of Stork and Dromedary, 2022
- Winner of the Constantijn Huygens Prize, 2023
- Winner of the Libris Prize for The Song of Stork and Dromedary, 2023
- Shortlisted for the National Book Award for Translated Literature for The Remembered Soldier, 2025
- Longlisted for the International Booker Prize for The Remembered Soldier, 2026
- Winner of the Republic of Consciousness Prize US and Canada for The Remembered Soldier, 2026
