= Republic of Consciousness Prize US and Canada =

Annual literary award

The Republic of Consciousness Prize US and Canada is an annual literary prize for small press fiction. It was launched in 2021 based on the same principles and guidelines as the UK and Irish prize of the same name (now called the Queen Mary Small Press Fiction Prize). The prize was brought to the US and Canada by Dallas bookshop owner Lori Feathers. It rewards fiction published by small presses based in the United States and Canada.

The prize is open to both novels and collections of short stories. The book must be published in the calendar year of the prize and must be in English or translated into English. The publisher must be based in either the US or Canada and its average annual net revenue must be less than US $750,000.

== Results ==
=== 2022 ===
The prize was first awarded in 2023 for the calendar year 2022. The shortlist was announced on 14 March 2023. The winner was announced on 28 March 2023.

- Winner: Arinze Ifeakandu, God’s Children Are Little Broken Things: Stories (A Public Space Books)
- Gabriela Ponce, Blood Red, translated by Sarah Booker (Restless Books)
- Jon Fosse, A New Name, Septology VI-VII, translated by Damion Searls (Transit Books)
- Hans von Trotha, Pollak’s Arm, translated by Elisabeth Lauffer (New Vessel Press)
- Suzette Mayr, The Sleeping Car Porter (Coach House Books)

The following books were also longlisted for the prize.

- Gabriela Alemán, Family Album: Stories, translated by Dick Cluster and Mary Ellen Fieweger (City Lights Books)
- Robin McLean, Get 'em Young, Treat 'em Tough, Tell 'em Nothing (And Other Stories)
- Caio Fernando Abreu, Moldy Strawberries: Stories, translated by Bruna Dantas Lobato (Archipelago Books)
- Ella Baxter, New Animal (Two Dollar Radio)
- Cristina Rivera Garza, New and Selected Stories, translated by Sarah Booker, Lisa Dillman, and Francisca González, Alex Ross, and the author (Dorothy, A Publishing Project)

=== 2023 ===
The shortlist for the 2023 prize was announced on 5 March 2024 and the winner on 19 March 2024.

- Winner: Ebru Ojen, Lojman, translated by Aron Aji and Selin Gökçesu (City Lights Publishers)
- Kate Briggs, The Long Form (Dorothy, a publishing project)
- Sebastián Martínez Daniell, Two Sherpas, translated by Jennifer Croft (Charco Press)
- Laurent Mauvignier, The Birthday Party, translated by Daniel Levin Becker (Transit Books)
- Mandy-Suzanne Wong, The Box (Graywolf Press)

The following books were also longlisted for the prize:

- Jazmina Barrera, Cross Stitch, translated by Christina MacSweeney (Two Lines Press)
- Don Gillmor, Breaking and Entering (Biblioasis)
- Johanna Hedva, Your Love is Not Good (And Other Stories)
- Christine Lai, Landscapes (Two Dollar Radio)
- Ada Zhang, The Sorrows of Others (A Public Space)

=== 2024 ===
The shortlist for the 2024 prize was announced on 26 February 2025.

- Winner: Rodrigo Fresán, Melvill, translated by Will Vanderhyden (Open Letter Books)
- Jakuta Alikavazovic, Like a Sky Inside, translated by Daniel Levin Becker (Fern Books)
- Mark Haber, Lesser Ruins (Coffee House Press)
- Vera Mutafchieva, The Case of Cem, translated by Angela Rodel (Sandorf Passage)
- Jón Kalman Stefánsson, Your Absence Is Darkness, translated by Philip Roughton (Biblioasis)

The following books were also longlisted for the prize:

- Leah Hager Cohen, To & Fro (Bellevue Literary Press)
- Lindsay Hill, Tidal Lock (McPherson & Company)
- Ariane Koch, Overstaying, translated by Damion Searls (Dorothy)
- Suzumi Suzuki, Gifted, translated by Allison Markin Powell (Transit Books)
- Manya Wilkinson, Lublin (And Other Stories)

=== 2025 ===
The shortlist for the 2025 prize was announced 2 March 2026. The winner was announced on 11 March 2026.

- Winner: Anjet Daanje, trans. by David McKay, The Remembered Soldier (New Vessel Press)
- Rosalind Belben, Dreaming of Dead People (And Other Stories)
- Michael Bible, Little Lazarus (CLASH Books)
- Laura Vazquez, trans. by Alex Niemi, The Endless Week (Dorothy, a publishing project)
- Austyn Wohlers, Hothouse Bloom (Hub City Press)

The following books were also longlisted for the prize:

- Ana Paula Maia, On Earth As It Is Beneath, translated by Padma Viswanathan (Charco Press)
- Josephine Rowe, Little World (Transit Books)
- Miranda Schreiber, Iris and the Dead (Book*hug Press)
- Mahreen Sohail, Small Scale Sinners (A Public Space Books)
- Sarah Yahm, Unfinished Acts of Wild Creation (Dzanc Books)
