= Sergei Lebedev (writer) =

Russian writer

Sergei Lebedev Сергей Лебедев
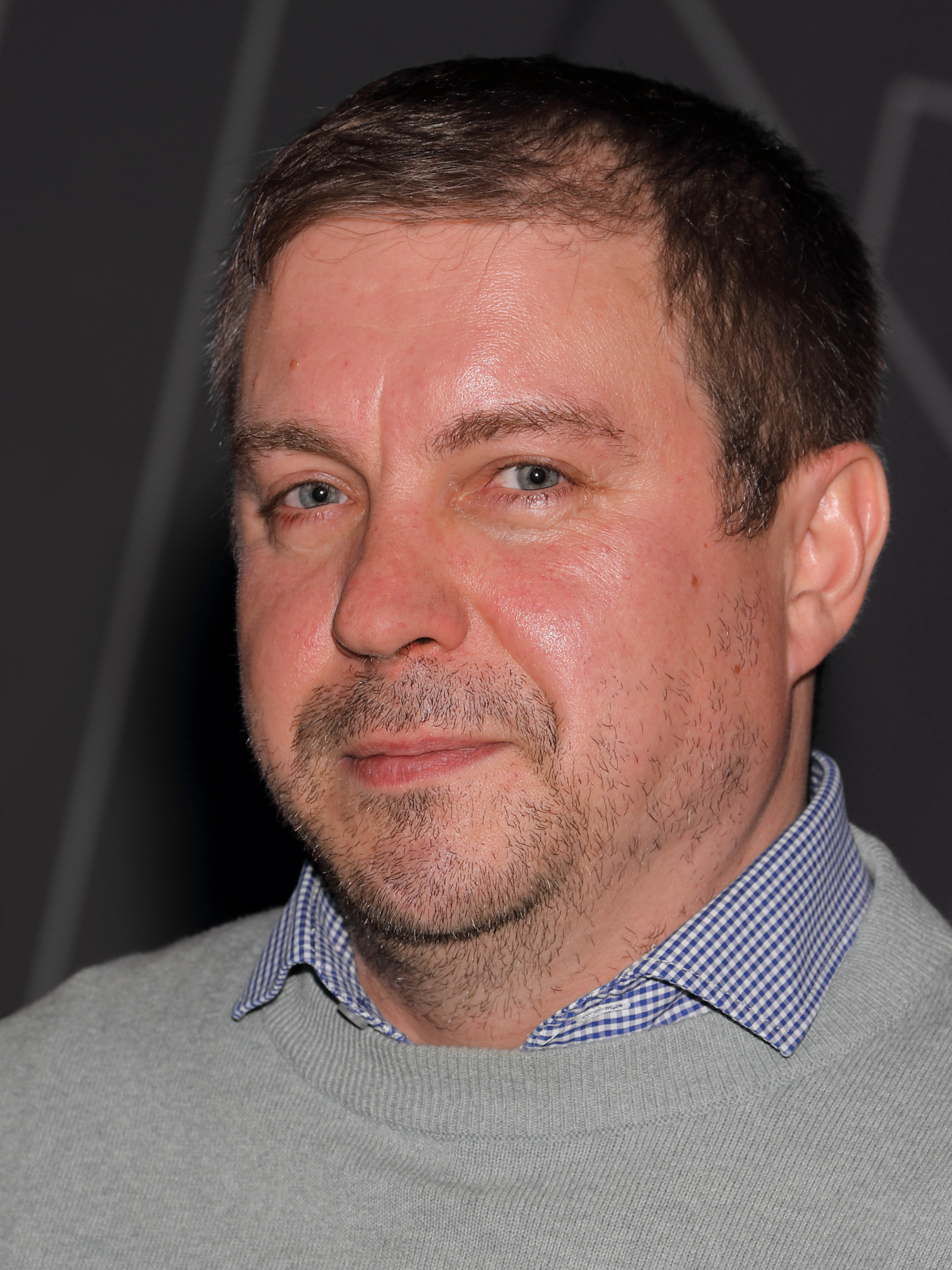
- Sergei Sergejewitsch Lebedew, 2025
- Born: 17 June 1981 (age 45); Moscow, Russian SFSR
- Citizenship: Soviet Union, Russia
- Occupations: writer, geologist
- Writing career
- Genres: Fiction, non-fiction
- Website: newvesselpress.com/authors/sergei-lebedev/

Sergei Sergeevich Lebedev (Russian: Сергей Сергеевич Лебедев, born on 17 June 1981) is a Russian émigré writer, based in Berlin. He cites John le Carré’s books as an important influence on his fiction books. Lebedev also writes in English.

== Biography ==
Born in Moscow to a family of geologists, the writer participated in geological expeditions to north Russia and Central Asia between 1995 and 2002. Between 2000 and 2014 Lebedev worked as Deputy Editor of Simon Soloveychik’s pedagogical newspaper Pervoe Sentiabria.

== Views on literature ==
'In Russia, the new evil is rooted in the old evil. […] Putin has brought back old methods of intimidation and – in certain cases – what the KGB called “physical removal”. […] For me, Russian literature at the moment consists of non-written books. Writers have a moral and creative responsibility to reflect reality. […] There was only one book on the war in Chechnya and nothing from the writings of Anna Politkovskaya.'

== Political views ==
‘Thirty years ago, the Belovezhy Agreement formally put an end to the Soviet Union. With the exception of the Baltic countries, the USSR disintegrated into smaller post-Soviet entities that still carry the legacy of totalitarianism. This is a major obstacle to pro-democracy movements and democratic transition.’

‘I believe that Russia’s democratic movement needs to develop a cultural and political strategy based on the premise that impunity for Soviet-era crimes has engendered the present-day authoritarian Russian state. Society’s acceptance of its share of responsibility for tolerating the past totalitarian regime should be reflected in concrete legal steps that condemn Soviet crimes, set up a mechanism for material compensation, open up the archives and develop a programme of commemoration; in relation to the present day this should take the form of lustration that will restore functioning democratic institutions by barring from power anyone who has committed crimes against democracy in the new Russia.’

Following Russia’s 2022 full-scale attack on Ukraine, Lebedev emphasized: ‘The world doesn’t just need a Russia without Putin – the world needs a Russia without imperial consciousness.’ The writer signed the open letter of Russian-language writers against the war. According to Lebedev: ‘If Russia is to have any future, it will have to become another country.’

‘Navalny's death means the Gulag still exists. And it has eaten another victim.’

‘While Putin wages wars, Russians seem not to care. Where does this Russian indifference come from? The answer lies in the need to survive, during Soviet times and after.’ ‘The most difficult and problematic thing is that Russians are getting used to the fact that they are at war but still life is sustainable.’

‘This [Russian] emigre community in Europe is now one of the most important targets for the Russian security (services). […] There will be attempts to infiltrate, to get informants. Of course, there will be some assassination attempts.’

‘Impunity, militarism and chauvinism [are] the pillars of Putin's neo-empire.’

‘So it is up to Russian intellectuals to work through this difficult subject [of empire], to reveal the true nature of Russian expansion, and to understand how high Russian culture itself was (and still is) instrumentalized as a tool of Russian state chauvinism, of forcible Russification. […] The future is certainly not bright today. […] The most urgent thing would be to restore justice and punish war criminals. Unfortunately, we should not be too optimistic in this regard.’

‘Even the best and most knowledgeable experts [in the West] are used to looking at Russia through the lens of Russian language, Russian culture, Russian history. But I dream of the day when this monopoly will be actively challenged. And here you will have a Tatar intellectual or an Udmurt intellectual talking about his or her views on the Russian imperial complex as a cultural and political problem. I can assure you that this would be a hard experience, because Russia's nations are being diminished by Putin's regime and at the same time used in a traditional colonial way as a source of manpower for aggression against Ukraine.’

== Writings ==
Novels

- 2016: Oblivion (translated from the Russian by Antonina W. Bouis). New York: New Vessel Press. ISBN 9781939931290, 260pp.
- 2017: The Year of the Comet (translated from the Russian by Antonina W. Bouis). New York: New Vessel Press. ISBN 9781939931412, 245pp.
- 2019: The Goose Fritz (translated from the Russian by Antonina W. Bouis). New York: New Vessel Press. ISBN 9781939931641, 322pp.
- 2021: Untraceable (translated from the Russian by Antonina W. Bouis). New York: New Vessel Press. ISBN 9781939931900, 242pp.
- 2025: The Lady of the Mine (translated from the Russian by Antonina W. Bouis). New York: New Vessel Press. ISBN 9781954404304, 240pp.

Stories

- 2023: A Present Past: Titan and Other Chronicles (translated from the Russian by Antonina W. Bouis). New York: New Vessel Press. ISBN 9781954404182, 288pp.

Poetry

- 2008: Стихи [Poems]. 2008. Звезда. No. 5.
- 2019: Воздух высот. Стихи [Air of the Peaks: Poems]. 2019. Знамя. No. 1.
