= Ada Zhang =

American author

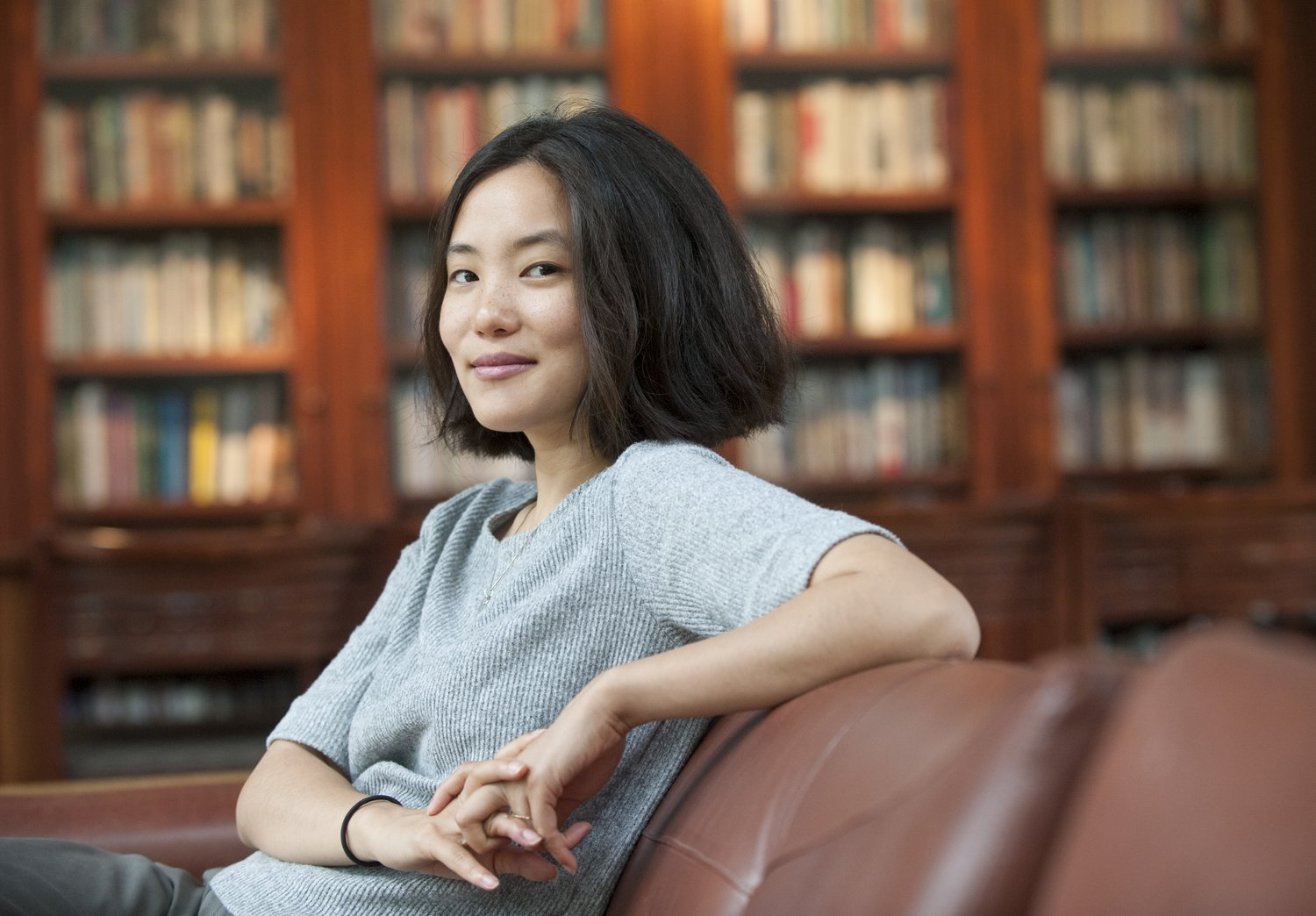
- Ada Zhang sitting on a couch in front of bookshelves.
- Born: Ada Zhang
- Occupation: Writer: fiction
- Writing career
- Genre: fiction
- Notable work: The Sorrows of Others

Ada Zhang is an American short-story writer. Her debut collection, The Sorrows of Others, was published May 9, 2023. It was an honoree of the 5 Under 35 award by the National Book Foundation.

Zhang is a graduate of the Iowa Writers' Workshop and her work has been published in McSweeney's and A Public Space, and The Alaska Quarterly Review.

== Life ==
Zhang grew up in Austin, Texas and now lives in New York City.

== The Sorrows of Others ==
Zhang's debut short story collection centers around themes of loss, loneliness, grief, and joy in characters from the Chinese-American immigrant experience. Significant historical ties included in the book are relations to the Cultural Revolution and the Communist movement in China which was led by Mao Zedong from 1966 to 1976.

Zhang wrote one of the first stories in 2015 before deciding to apply to an MFA program in creative writing. She wrote the rest of the collection during the COVID-19 pandemic throughout 2020.

=== Reception ===
Yiyun Li wrote that "Ada Zhang is a bighearted and sensitive writer, and these stories... are a triumph". The collection made notable mentions across literary platforms including The Millions by Jai Chakrabarti, Ms., and Katie Couric Media. Belinda Huijuan Tang of Literary Hub called Zhang "one of the most skilled short story writers of our time" for her work on The Sorrows of Others. Booklist called the collection "filled with lost souls aching for connection on both sides of the world" in a starred review.

== Awards ==
Year	Work	Award	Category	Result	Ref.
2023	The Sorrows of Others	National Book Foundation	"5 Under 35 Award"	Won	
2023	The Sorrows of Others	Republic of Consciousness Prize US and Canada	—	Longlisted	
2023	The Sorrows of Others	The Story Prize	—	Longlisted	
2024	The Sorrows of Others	PEN/Robert W. Bingham Prize	—	Longlisted	

== Bibliography ==
- The Sorrows of Others (2023)
