= Pitigrilli =

Italian writer (1893–1975)

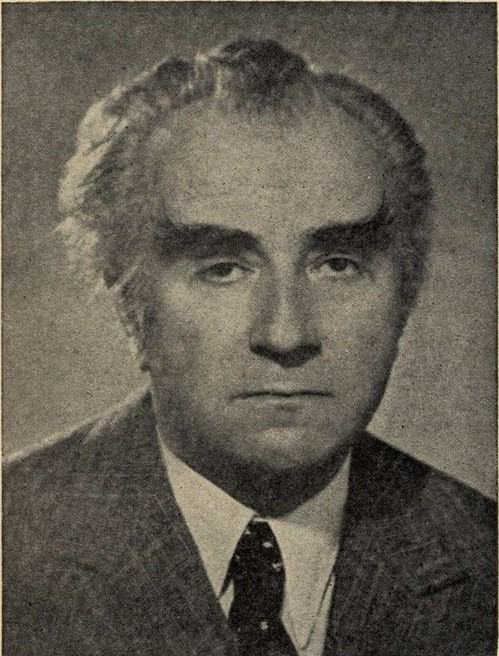
Pitigrilli in 1950

Pitigrilli was the pseudonym of Dino Segre (9 May 1893 – 8 May 1975), an Italian writer who made his living as a journalist and novelist. His most noted novel was Cocaina (1921), published under his pseudonym and placed on the list of prohibited books by the Catholic Church because of his treatment of drug use (cocaina being cocaine) and sex. It has been translated into several languages and re-issued in several editions. Pitigrilli published novels up until 1974, the year before his death. He spent his later decades of life as a Catholic himself.

Pitigrilli founded the literary magazine Grandi Firme, which was published in Turin from 1924 to 1938, when it was banned under the antisemitic Italian racial laws of the Fascist government. Although baptized a Catholic, Segre was classified as Jewish at that time. His father was Jewish, and Pitigrilli had married a Jewish woman, although they had long lived apart. He had worked in the 1930s as an informant for the Italian fascist secret service OVRA but was dismissed in 1939 after being exposed in Paris.

Pitigrilli had travelled in Europe in the 1930s while maintaining his house in Turin. His efforts, beginning in 1938, to change his racial status were not successful, and he was interned as a Jew in 1940 after Italy's entrance into the war as an ally of Germany. He was released the same year and wrote anonymously in Rome to earn money. After Benito Mussolini's government fell in 1943 and the Germans began to occupy Italy, Pitigrilli fled to Switzerland, where his second wife (a Catholic) and their daughter joined him. They lived there until 1947, then moved to Argentina. Segre and his family returned to Europe in 1958 and settled in Paris, occasionally visiting Turin.

== Biography ==
=== Early life and family ===
Dino Segre was born in Turin. His mother was Catholic and his father was Jewish; he was baptized a Catholic. He went to local schools and to the University of Turin, Faculty of Law, where he graduated in 1916. After university, he spent time among literary and art circles in Paris.

Segre had a short-lived relationship with the poet Amalia Guglielminetti. In 1932 he married a Jewish woman after she became pregnant during their relationship. They married outside the Catholic Church. They had one son, Gianni Segre. By the late 1930s, they had long been separated and were living apart, but there was no divorce in Italy.

It was Pitigrilli's marriage to a Jewish woman more than his own ancestry that initially made him the focus of the 1938 Racial Laws. By 1939 he was being referred to in OVRA files as a "Jewish writer." Claiming to seek exemption from the Racial Laws for his son, in 1938 Pitigrilli sought a ruling on his marriage from the Vatican, which held it had never happened, as it took place outside the church. They ruled his first wife was effectively a concubine.

In July 1940 in Genoa, after he had already been interned as a Jew in Uscio, a small town nearby, Pitigrilli married the attorney Lina Furlan of Turin, who had handled his case with the Vatican. A Catholic, she was violating racial purity laws by marrying someone considered to be Jewish. They had a son in mid-1943, Pier Maria Furlan, who was baptized a Catholic.

=== Career ===
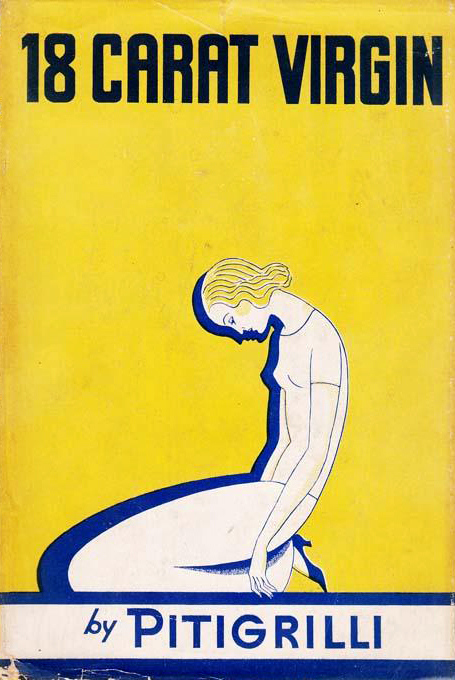
Cover of the English edition of 18 Carat Virgin by Pitigrilli in 1933. It was first published in Italy in 1924.

As a young adult, Segre started working as a journalist and novelist in Turin, a centre of literary culture. His early experiences in Paris inspired his most famous novel, Cocaine (1921), published in Italian under his pseudonym of "Pitigrilli". Due to his portrayal of drug use and sex, the Catholic Church listed it as a "forbidden book." It has been translated into numerous languages, reprinted in new editions, and become a classic.

Cocaine established Pitigrilli as a literary figure in Italy. It was not translated into English until 1933; it was reissued in the 1970s, and a release by New Vessel Press is scheduled for September 2013. The New York Times wrote: “The name of the author Pitigrilli … is so well known in Italy as to be almost a byword for ‘naughtiness’ ... The only wonder to us is that some enterprising translator did not render some of his books available in English sooner.”

Alexander Stille, who documented Segre's later collaboration with the fascist government (see below), wrote:

Pitigrilli is a highly emblematic forgotten figure, a 'poète maudit' of Italy of the 1920s; his cynical comic satire describes the disillusioned world that followed World War I and proved fertile for the triumph of fascism."

In 1924 Segre founded the literary magazine Grandi Firme, which attracted a large readership of young literati. Rising young writers and illustrators had work featured in the magazine. Redesigned by César Civita, the magazine operated until 1938, when the Fascist government of Benito Mussolini banned publications owned by Jews under the anti-Semitic Race Laws.

Pitigrilli was noted as an aphorist. Among his most well-known aphorisms are "Fragments: a providential resource for writers who don't know how to put together an entire book" and "Grammar: a complicated structure that teaches language but impedes speaking".

=== Fascism and World War II ===
From 1930 Segre started travelling around Europe, staying mainly in Paris with brief periods in Italy. In 1936 the fascist government prevented reprinting of his books, on moral grounds. Seeking to join the Fascist Party, he wrote directly to Mussolini in 1938.

By that time, he was already working as an informant for OVRA, the secret service of the Fascist government. He provided information about anti-fascist Jewish writers in his circle, as well as Jewish relatives. OVRA dismissed him in 1939, after he was exposed in Paris when a file including his name was found by French police in the flat of Vincenzo Bellavia, the OVRA director there.

Despite his work for the government, Pitigrilli began to be persecuted as a Jew. His books were banned, as was his magazine, and he could not write for other magazines. In June 1940, Italy entered the war as an ally of Nazi Germany. Turin police included Pitigrilli on a list of "dangerous Jews" to be interned in the south of Italy in Apulia. He and his lawyer, with the help of the intervention of Edvige Mussolini, were able to have the place of internment changed to Uscio, a small town near the Riviera that was two hours from Turin.

Pitigrilli appealed directly to the government for release from internal exile and was freed by the end of the year. By 1941 he went to Rome, where he wrote movie dialogue anonymously to circumvent the racial law and make some kind of living. He offered his services again to OVRA, saying his status as a persecuted Jew would provide him cover. He was seeking to have Aryan status confirmed, as he had been baptized Catholic. He was never rehired, and never gained a change in his racial status.

In July 1943 Mussolini's fascist regime fell. Six weeks later the Germans occupied Italy, and Pitigrilli fled to neutral Switzerland. His wife and daughter, who were recorded as Catholic, could travel openly and joined him there. They lived in Switzerland until 1947 and after the war's end.

=== Postwar years ===
In 1948 Segre and his family moved to Argentina, then under the rule of Juan Perón. They remained there for ten years. He continued to write but had no novels published in Italy from 1938 to 1948.

On the invitation of a playwright friend, it was recorded that Pitigrilli visited for Mass, sitting in the darkened back of a church. The priest leading mass at that time, the famed Padre Pio, said to all assembled, “Let’s pray fervently for someone who is in great need of prayer. One day he will approach the Eucharistic table and will bring many with him who have been in error like himself.” This moved Pitigrilli to tears. Padre Pio told Pitigrilli afterwards, “What profit a man to gain the whole world and lose his soul. Truly, God is good to you.” Pitigrilli was moved deeply, and became a firm Catholic. His later literary works reflect a more Christian message.

In 1958, Pitigrilli moved with his family again, returning to Europe to live in Paris. He occasionally visited his house in Turin, which he had managed to keep. He continued to write and publish novels as Pitigrilli until 1974. He died in Turin in 1975.

Following his death, his Dolicocefala Bionda and L'Esperimento di Pott, two early novels, were re-issued in one edition in 1976 with an introduction by the noted Italian author Umberto Eco. Eco wrote: “Pitigrilli was an enjoyable writer – spicy and rapid – like lightning”.

=== Collaboration with the Fascist regime ===
In 1991 Alexander Stille published Benevolence and Betrayal: Five Italian Jewish Families under Fascism. Stille documents how Pitigrilli acted as an informant for the Fascist secret police OVRA during the 1930s, until 1939. Stille noted that the Fascist secret police used intelligence from these conversations to arrest and prosecute anti-fascist Jewish friends and relatives of Pitigrilli.

Stille used many documents and accounts by members of the clandestine anti-fascist movement Giustizia e Libertà (Justice and Freedom) operating in Turin. An Italian post-war government committee investigating collaborators and OVRA concluded about the writer: "…the last doubt (on Pitigrilli being OVRA informant number 373) could not stand after the unequivocal and categorical testimonies … about encounters and confidential conversations that took place exclusively with Pitigrilli".

== Works ==
- Mammiferi di Lusso (1920)
- Cocaina (1921)
- The Man Who Searched for Love (1929)
- L'esperimento di Pott (1929)
- Dolicocefala Bionda (1936)
- Le Amanti. La Decadenza del Paradosso (1938)
- La Piscina di Siloe (1948)
- La moglie di Putifarre (1953)
- Amore a Prezzo Fesso (short stories, 1963)
- La Donna di 30, 40, 50, 60 Anni (1967)
- L'Ombelico di Adamo. Peperoni dolci (1970)
- Sette delitti (1971)
- Nostra Signora di Miss Tif (1974)

=== English translations ===
- The Man Who Searched for Love, translated by Warre B. Wells. New York: R. M. McBride & Company, 1932.
- Cocaine, New York: Greenberg, 1933. Reissued in 1974, AND/OR Press, San Francisco. Reissue in 2013 by New Vessel Press, released on 15 September 2013.
