= Killing the Second Dog =

1965 novel by Marek Hłasko

Polish early edition

Killing the Second Dog (Polish: Drugie zabicie psa) is a novel by Polish writer Marek Hłasko. The novel, published in 1965, is the first in his so-called "Israeli trilogy", a series of novels following the exploits of Jacob and Robert, con-artists who prey on women.

== Background ==
Hłasko, who had left communist Poland in 1958, landed in Israel in 1959. Unable to find work or fit into Israeli society, he lived as a vagrant, though his income from previous publications staved off destitution. By 1960 he had moved again, to West Germany. The semi-autobiographical Killing the Second Dog was published in 1965, followed the next year by Nawrócony w Jaffie ("Converted in Jaffa"). The third part of the trilogy is the novella Opowiem wam o Esther ("I want to tell you about Esther").

== Content ==
Jacob (in whom we should see the author, according to Arnon Grunberg) and Robert are con men in Tel Aviv who prey on single women who visit Israel. The con starts with Jacob, posing as a sensitive and helpless man, gaining the women's trust and manipulating them into "saving" him. He then pretends, racked by guilt over an event in his past, to want to commit suicide; he doesn't, but instead kills his dog to indicate how emotionally destitute he is.

== Publication and translations ==
An English translation by Tomasz Mirkowicz was published by Cane Hill Press c. 1990, and republished (with an introduction by Lesley Chamberlain) in 2014 by New Vessel Press. The entire trilogy was published in Dutch, translated by Karol Lesman and Gerard Rasch, with an afterword by Arnon Grunberg (whose first venture, a publishing company, had published Lesman's translation of I want to tell you about Esther).
