= Giovana Madalosso =

Brazilian writer

Giovana Madalosso (born 1975) is a Brazilian writer.

== Biography ==
Madalosso was born in Curitiba. She graduated in journalism at the Federal University of Paraná, worked as an advertising copywriter and settled in São Paulo. She faced resistance from publishers to the theme of her debut book, A Teta Racional, whose short stories dealt with her experience of motherhood and breastfeeding. A Teta Racional was a finalist of the 2017 Clarice Lispector Prize.

The Tokyo Suite, finalist for the 63rd Jabuti Prize in the Literary Novel category, was her first book to be translated into Spanish and English.

Together with Natalia Timerman and Paula Carvalho, she gathered more than 400 women writers in Pacaembu during the 2022 São Paulo Book Fair for the event A Great Day in São Paulo, inspired by the photo A Great Day in Harlem. The event spread to another 50 cities, with almost 1,700 authors gathering for photos and mapping the literature produced by women in Brazil. In 2020, she was one of the organizers of Memorial Inumeráveis, a project that pays tribute to the victims of the COVID-19 pandemic in Brazil by telling their stories. Since January 2023 she has been a columnist for the newspaper Folha de S.Paulo.

== Works ==
- 2016 - A Teta Racional (Grua)
- 2018- Tudo Pode Ser Roubado (Todavia)
- 2019 - Suíte Tóquio (Todavia)
  - English version - The Tokyo Suite (translated by Bruna Dantas Lobato; Europa Editions, 2025)
- 2025 - Batida Só (Todavia)
