= Alexis Ragougneau =

French playwright and novelist

- Born: 1973 (age 52–53)
- Occupations: Playwright and novelist
- Writing career
- Notable works: Niels (2017), Évangile pour un gueux (2016), La Madone de Notre-Dame (2014)
- Notable awards: Final shortlist for the 2017 Prix Goncourt

Alexis Ragougneau (born 1973) is a French playwright and novelist.

He has written a number of books: Niels (2017), Évangile pour un gueux (2016) and La Madone de Notre-Dame (2014), which has been translated into English by Katherine Gregor. Niels was one of eight novels in the second selection for the 2017 Prix Goncourt.
