= Marek Hłasko =

Polish writer (1934–1969)

- Born: 14 January 1934; Warsaw, Poland
- Died: 14 June 1969 (aged 35); Wiesbaden, West Germany
- Occupation: Writer

Marek Hłasko (14 January 1934 – 14 June 1969) was a Polish author and screenwriter.

== Life ==
Hłasko's biography is highly mythologized, and many of the legends about his life he spread himself. Marek was born in Warsaw, as the only son of Maciej Hłasko and Maria Łucja, née Rosiak. At first he lived with his parents in Złotokłos; later they moved to Warsaw. In the Hłasko family, children were baptised relatively late, hence the writer-to-be was baptized on 26 December 1935 in the Church of the Holy Redeemer in Warsaw. It is said that during the baptism ceremony when asked if he renounces the evil spirits Marek answered "No". Later, these words were reported as the evidence of Marek's strong character.

Hłasko was three years old when his parents divorced in 1937. Maciej remarried a year later. He died on 13 September 1939, when his only son was five. The war left its stamp on Marek's psyche: later he wrote "it is obvious to me that I am a product of war times, starvation and terror; it is the reason for the intellectual poverty of my short stories. Simply, I cannot think up a story that does not end in death, catastrophe, suicide or imprisonment. Some people accuse me of pretending to be a strong man. They are wrong." At the outbreak of World War II, Hłasko's mother was working in the management secretariat of the City Power Station in Warsaw. During the occupation, she was fired and ran a food stall till the beginning of the Warsaw Uprising. As a result, the family's financial situation worsened. At this time Marek started his education; however, all documents that might provide information about his education were destroyed during the Warsaw Uprising. Among the schools that he attended was one near the St. Kazimierz Factory on Tamka Street. During the Warsaw Uprising, Marek stayed with his mother in Warsaw, and when it ended they moved to Częstochowa to the house of a friend. In March 1945, Maria and her son moved to Chorzów and two months later to Białystok, where she settled with Kazimierz Gryczkiewicz. In early 1946, Gryczkiewicz, Maria Hłasko and Marek moved to Wrocław.

In the summer of 1946, Marek Hłasko joined the Bolesław Chrobry First Wrocław Scout Troops. In order to become a member of the troop, Marek with his family's consent, gave 1933 as the year of his birth. Later he was dismissed from the scouts because of the poor attendance at the meetings. Marek worked as a messenger at the World Congress of Intellectuals for Peace, held in August 1948 in Wrocław.

The problems connected with Marek's education also cropped up. In his biography of Hłasko, Andrzej Czyżewski writes: "(Marek) began his education at the age of six and a half. During his school, years he was always one of the youngest pupils in the class. To make matters worse, he had a childish appearance. Hence, he could not show off with what a boy in the primary school wants to impress others: strength, dexterity and maturity. He made up for it with boldness, audacity and aggression, even towards his teachers. As a consequence, he had very few school mates and was always an outsider. He walked away before he managed to make friends and get accustomed to them.". In June 1948 he graduated from the Maria Konopnicka Elementary School in Wrocław.

From September to November 1948, he studied at the Chamber of Commerce of the Secondary School of Business and Administration in Wrocław, and from March until June 1949 in the Labour Association of Children Friends’ School in Legnica (at that time he lived in a dormitory). Later, from December 1949 to January 1950, he attended the Technical and Drama High School in Warsaw, yet, in the end of December 1949 and early January 1950, he was expelled for "a notorious disrespect to school regulations, criminal violations, and wielding a corrupting influence on his colleagues".

At the age of 16, he obtained his driving licence and started working as a van driver. On 28 September 1950 he was sentenced by the Magistrates' Court to two months of work with a 10% deduction from his salary (as he violated Article 7, point 2 of the Act on Securing Socialist Discipline of Work). After working off his sentence, he changed his employer.

From 15 November 1950 to 1 January 1951, he worked in the Transport Depot in Bystrzyca Kłodzka. Experiences gained there later inspired him to write a novel Następny do raju (Next Stop–Paradise). In January 1951 he moved to Warsaw with his mother and step-father. Hłasko often changed his occupation but it was always his own choice. Successively, he worked from 26 February to 15 April 1951 in an Equipment Base of the City's Construction Union, from 27 April 1951 to 16 June 1952 in a subway construction company "Metrobudowa", from 4 August to 1 December 1952 in a Transport Association of Warsaw Associations of Consumers, and till 30 March 1953 in a Warsaw Transport Enterprise of the City Retail Sale.

Writing became a chance to get out of this mind-numbing activity. His literary career started in 1951 when he wrote Baza Sokołowska, his first set of short stories. Hłasko became a correspondent for Trybuna Ludowa (a communist Polish daily) when he was working for "Metrobudowa". At the end of 1952 he decided to show extracts of his book to Bohdan Czeszko. His reply letter written on 3 December of the same year included a criticism of Hłasko's literary attempts, but also drew attention to the young author's talent. Moreover, also in 1952, Hłasko followed Stefan Łoś's advice and established contact with the Polish Literary Association and Igor Newerly, who was the protector of young writers. Hłasko introduced himself, to both Czeszko and Newerly, as "an uneducated driver who tries to describe his life in his free time after work".

In April 1953, he received a three-month artistic scholarship from the Polish Literary Association. He gave up his driver's job for good, and went to Wrocław to work on his debut. Moreover, following Bohdan Czeszko's advice, he wrote a story based on his sketches (a final version of Baza Sokołowska) and finished a novel Sonata marymoncka.

He made his debut with Baza Sokołowska in Sztandar Młodych (a daily paper published in Poland in 1950–1997) in 1954. He became quickly known as the most talented writer of the young generation. However, the entering to the literary circle resulted in his alcoholism, which was becoming more and more pronounced. In 1955–1957, he edited a prose section in Po Prostu (a Polish socio-political magazine published in 1947–57), but he was not a good publicist. In 1956 he finally got his own flat in Warsaw.

He gained publicity and popularity thanks to his original working style as well as his unconventional behaviour and clothing. He was a legendary figure of the young generation, a symbol of non-conformism. He was well-built; however, the physical appearance concealed over-sensitivity and uncertainty. He was prone to depression and could not adapt to everyday reality. Marek's inclination to quarrel contrasted with his friends' positive opinions of him.

In 1958, he went to Paris. The press there called him an Eastern European James Dean, as Hłasko strikingly resembled him. Hłasko really identified himself with this role: he vandalized pubs and restaurants. At this time, he gained worldwide publicity. Nonetheless, he liked the life of a vagrant, so he left Paris and went to Germany and then to Italy.

The publication of Cmentarze [The Graveyard], a novel critical of state socialism, in the émigré Polish-language Parisian monthly Kultura, caused a negative press campaign to be launched against him back in Poland. When his request for renewal of his passport was rejected, Hłasko requested political asylum in West Germany. After three months, he changed his mind and tried to return to Poland. However, while waiting for a response from the Polish government, he decided to visit Israel in 1959. He could not live without Poland but at the same time he could not return to his homeland. As he did not have a talent for languages, he found it difficult to adjust to the reality of life abroad. He led a life of a vagrant, but he did not have to work while his publications provided him with a steady income. He performed manual labour, but he did so out of curiosity rather than need. Since 1960, he had lived in Germany with his wife, German actress Sonja Ziemann.

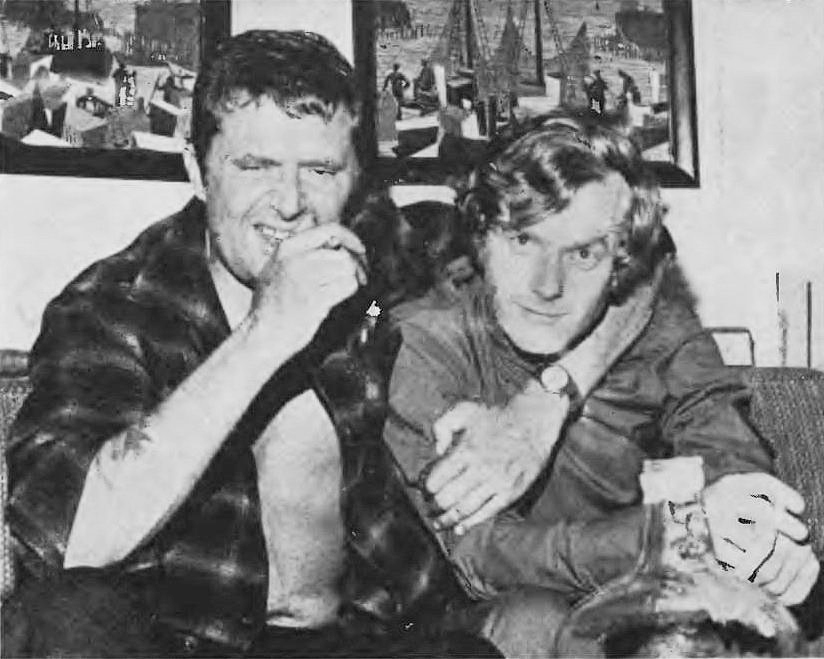
Marek Hłasko and Krzysztof Komeda

In 1963, he spent a month in prison because, being drunk, he got into quarrels with the police. In 1964 he twice attempted suicide. Between 1963 and 1965, he spent a total of 242 days in psychiatric clinics. In 1965, he divorced his wife, and in 1966, with Roman Polanski's help, he went to Los Angeles. He was supposed to write screenplays, but it did not work out. He had an affair with Betty Utey, the wife of Rebel Without a Cause director Nicholas Ray, ending his career as a screenwriter. He got a pilot's licence instead.

In December 1968, during one of his parties, he playfully pushed Krzysztof Komeda off an escarpment. As a result of this accident, Komeda got a brain hematoma and died four months later. Hłasko was to say: "If Krzysztof dies, I'll go along" (Jeśli Krzysio umrze, to i ja pójdę). In 1969, he came back to Germany.

He died in Wiesbaden at the age of 35. The circumstances of his death remain unknown. One hypothesis is that he mixed alcohol with sedative drugs. However, those who knew him maintain that suicide was out of the question in his case.

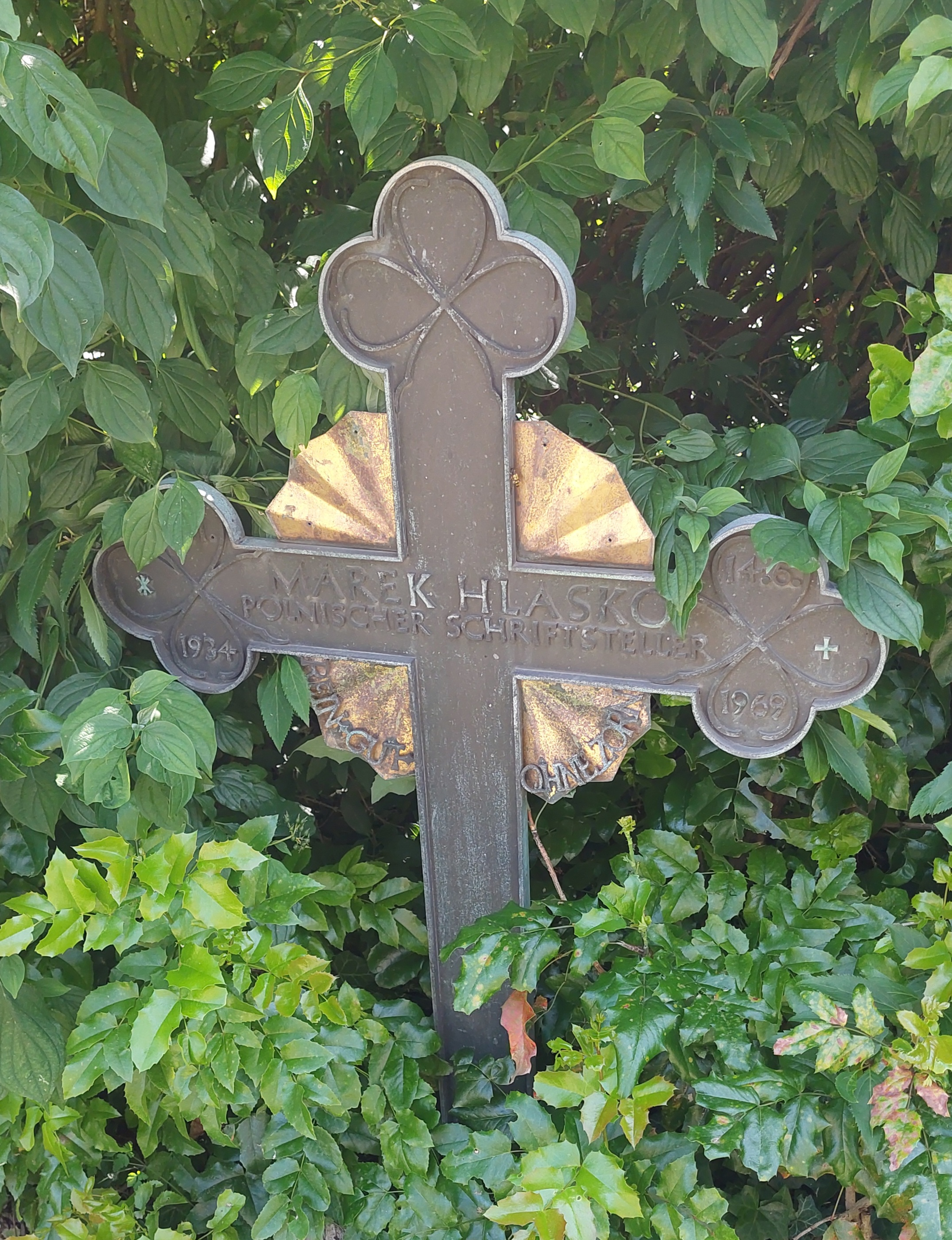
Firstgrave without ashes

In 1975, his ashes were taken to Poland, and buried at the Powązki Cemetery in Warsaw. Jan Himilsbach, a writer, actor and stonecutter who worked at the cemetery, was one of the initiators for taking Hłasko's remains back to Poland. Himilsbach carved the inscriptions on Hłasko's grave. The notice was suggested by Hłasko's mother and it says: "His life was short, and everybody turned their backs on him".

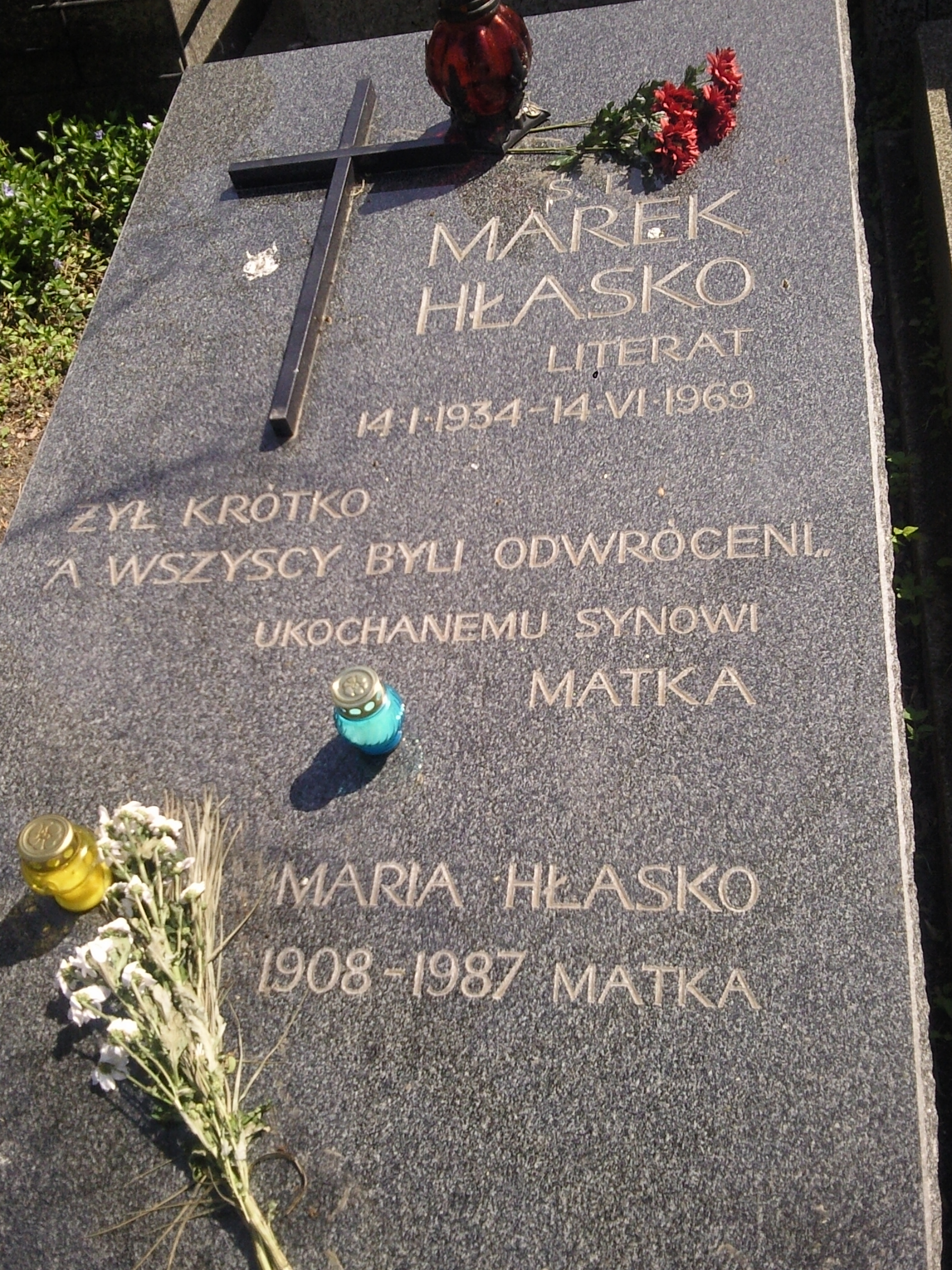
Grave in Warsaw with ashes

== Artistic work ==
Marek's private life resembled the life of characters of his works – romantic, tough outsiders, who became symbols of disappointment with realities of the 1950s. Humphrey Bogart and Fyodor Dostoevsky were his idols.

His prose works voiced his objections to conformity and the hypocrisy of socialist realist literature. He wrote about protest of a moral nature.

In his works he depicted the lives of the lower classes as dominated by hopelessness and cynicism. His characters dream about changes which come out to be vain.

Publishing of his works had been forbidden in Poland for 20 years.

He was a co-screenwriter of films such as Koniec nocy (1957), Pętla (1957), Spotkania (1957), Ósmy dzień tygodnia (1958) and Baza ludzi umarłych.

=== Novels ===
- Ósmy dzień tygodnia (The Eighth Day of the Week, 1957)
- Następny do raju (Next to Heaven/Next Stop–Paradise, 1958 - translation into English by Norbet Guterman published by Heinemann, 1959)
- Cmentarze (The Graveyard, 1958 - translation into English by Norbet Guterman published by Heinemann, 1959)
- Wszyscy byli odwróceni (All Backs Were Turned, 1964)
- Brudne czyny (Dirty Deeds, 1964)
- Drugie zabicie psa (Killing the Second Dog, 1965; translation into English by Tomasz Mirkowicz published by New Vessel Press, 2014)
- Nawrócony w Jaffie (Converted in Jaffa, 1966)
- Sowa córka piekarza (Owl, the Baker's Daughter, 1967)
- Sonata marymoncka (published posthumously 1982)
- Palcie ryż każdego dnia (Chew Your Nails Every Day, published posthumously 1985)

=== Short stories ===
- Wilk (novel fragment) (1954)
- Szkoła (novel fragment) (1954)
- Złota jesień (novel fragment) (1954)
- Noc nad piękną rzeką (novel fragment) (1954)
- Głód (novel fragment) (1956)
- Pierwszy krok w chmurach (1956) – a collection of short stories
  - Dom mojej matki
  - Robotnicy
  - Okno
  - List
  - Finis perfectus
  - Dwaj mężczyźni na drodze
  - Baza Sokołowska
  - Żołnierz
  - Kancik, czyli wszystko się zmieniło
  - Pijany o dwunastej w południe
  - Odlatujemy w niebo
  - Pierwszy krok w chmurach, Śliczna dziewczyna
  - Najświętsze słowa naszego życia
  - Lombard złudzeń
  - Pętla (short story)
- Stacja (1962)
- Opowiadania (1963)
  - Amor nie przyszedł dziś wieczorem
  - Namiętności
  - Port pragnień
  - Zbieg
  - Krzyż
  - Miesiąc Matki Boskiej
  - Szukając gwiazd
  - Powiedz im, kim byłem
  - W dzień śmierci Jego
- Umarli są wśród nas (published posthumously, 1986)
- Pamiętasz, Wanda? (published posthumously, 1986)
- Trudna wiosna (published posthumously, 1986)
- Brat czeka na końcu drogi (published posthumously, 1986)

=== Memoirs ===
- Piękni dwudziestoletni (Pretty Twenty-Year Olds, 1966)
- Beautiful Twentysomethings (translation, from Northern Illinois University Press, by Ross Ufberg, 2013)

=== A collection of essays ===
- Listy z Ameryki (1967)

== Film adaptations of writings ==
- Koniec nocy (1956, Director: Julian Dziedzina, Paweł Komorowski, Walentyna Uszycka)
- Spotkania (1957, Director: Stanisław Lenartowicz)
- Ósmy dzień tygodnia (1957, Director: Aleksander Ford)
- Pętla (1958, Director: Wojciech Jerzy Has)
- Baza ludzi umarłych (1958, Director: C. Petelski)
- Wszyscy byli odwróceni (1969)
- Suburbs (OF IBIS) (1972, Director: Lordan Zafranović)
- Sonata marymoncka (1987, Director: Jerzy Ridan)
- Isprani (1995, Director: Zrinko Ogresta)
