= Jeferson Tenório =

Brazilian writer (born 1977)

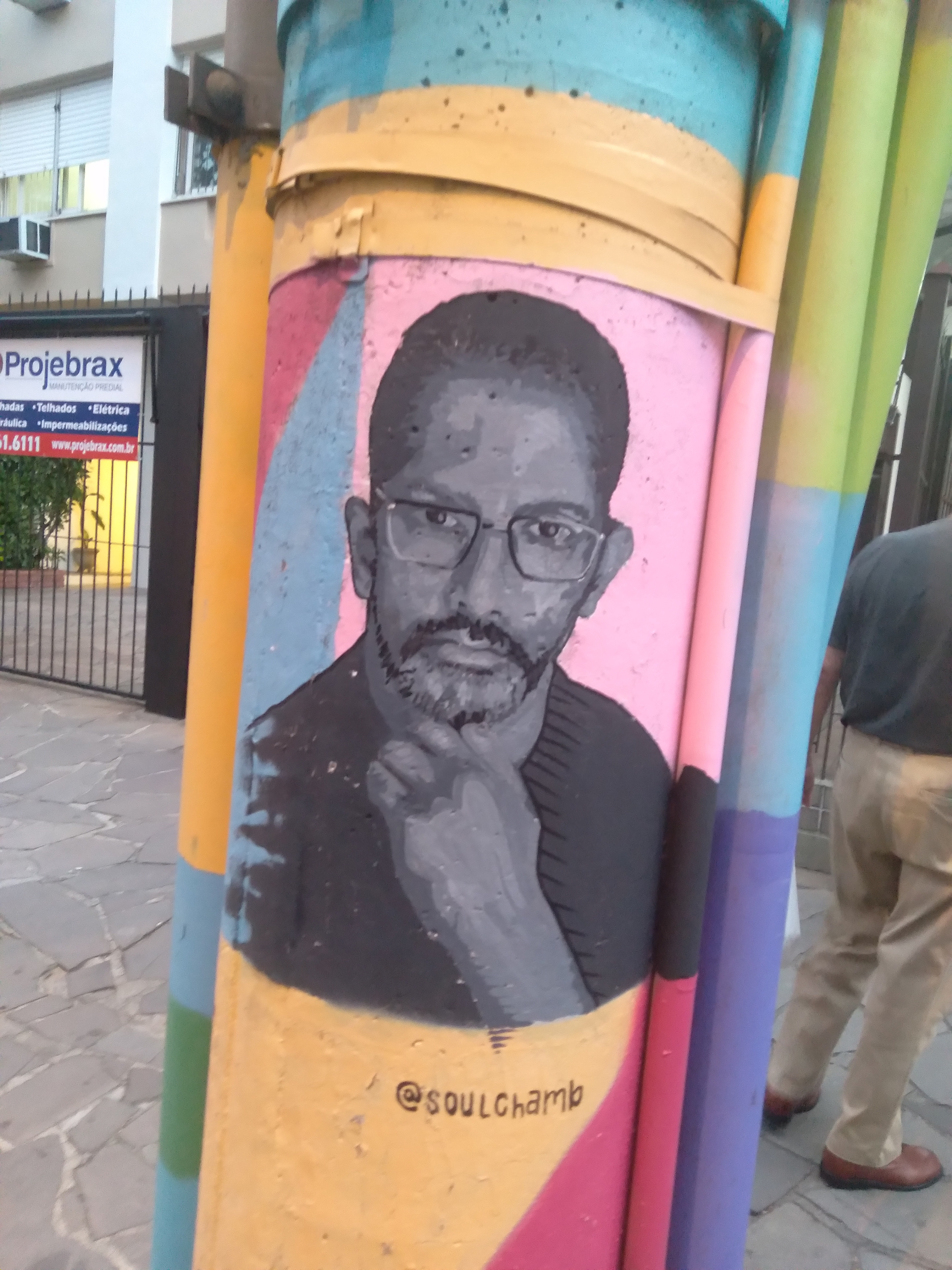
Artwork of Jeferson Tenório on Fernandes Vieira Street, Porto Alegre, part of the Project Street of Authors

Jeferson Tenorio (born 1977) is a Brazilian writer. He was born in Rio de Janeiro and now lives in Porto Alegre. He obtained a PhD in Literary Theory from Pontifical Catholic University of Rio Grande do Sul (PUC-RS). His stage texts and short stories have been translated into English and Spanish.

His debut novel O beijo na parede appeared in 2013 and was elected Book of the Year by Associação Gaúcha de Escritores. His novel O avesso da pele (2020) won the Prêmio Jabuti. It was published in English translation as Dark Side of Skin by Charco Press. It has been optioned for translations in Italian, French, Chinese and other languages.

One of Tenório's motives for beginning to write were his many encounters with police brutality. He believed that his writing could be a way to confront the racism present in the South of Brazil as well as the rest of the country. In general, his works touch on the themes of poverty, racial discrimination, and class inequality in Brazil.

In the majority of his works, the author provides a point of view ranging from early childhood to adolescence. Tenório believes that by using young characters, he can reach a larger audience, producing greater empathy from the readers because the voice of the child is more innocent and sincere.

== Writing career ==
Since the early 1990s, he began expanding his career in Porto Alegre, the capital of Rio Grande do Sul. During his undergraduate studies, Jefferson was awarded a scholarship from the National Council for Scientific and Technological Development (CNPq). With a bachelor in Portuguese and a master's degree in Luso-African literature from the Federal University of Rio Grande do Sul, he also has a PhD in literary theory from the Pontifical Catholic University of Rio Grande do Sul. His research is focused on colonialism, post-colonialism, identity, and the African diaspora in post-modernism. Additionally, he teaches Portuguese and literature in the public school system. His debut novel, O beijo na parede, was published in 2013 and was later voted Book of the Year by the Gaucho Writers Association. His short stories and screenplays have been translated to English as well as Spanish.

In 2018, he released his novel Estela sem Deus in association with publishing company Editora Zouk. This novel got a new edition in 2022 by Companhia das Letras (a respected Brazilian publishing company). His book rights have been sold to different countries including Italy, Portugal, France, England, Switzerland, the United States, Belgium, and China.

He also wrote the novel O avesso da pele (The Flipside of Skin) (2020), which won the Prêmio Jabuti in the Literary Novel category of the following year, which follows the story of a young man whose father, a black school teacher, was killed by soldiers of the Military Police Brigade.

Tenório writes two weekly columns for the online newspapers Zero Hora and the UOL portal. Tenório is also currently involved with the project Cartografias Narrativas (Narrative Cartographies) in the Portuguese language. This study occurs in association with the Graduate Program in Portuguese (PPGL) within the Pontifical Catholic University of Rio Grande do Sul (PUCRS) and began in 2017 with the objective to promote authors, texts, and literary theories within the Lusophone world. Up to the present, several articles have already been produced based on 100+ works, within the project.

He received an honorable mention at the 19th Paulo Leminski Short Story Competition held by the Western Paraná State University; he won the 15th Poemas no Ônibus Contest and the 3rd Poemas no Trem Contest by the local government of Porto Alegre (Poems on the bus; Poems on the train). In 2020 he was the first black man elected as the patron of the Feira do Livro (Book fair) in Porto Alegre. In 2022, Tenório received the title of Citizen of Porto Alegre from the City of Porto Alegre. The author of the proposal, councilwoman Bruna Rodrigues, said “we want to make Jeferson a living legacy of the city such that black people can occupy space in society more and more”.

== Activism ==
The author remains active in racial discussions and debates within Brazil. In one of his weekly publications for the online newspaper UOL, he commented on the killing of João Alberto Freitas, who died after being beaten in Porto Alegre on November 19, 2020. Tenório said: “Sometimes I think that we, black people, in the end, have a unique journey to fulfill: which is to forsake being black… No black person lives without the weight of reprisal because of their color”. The author also commented in his column about the difficulties of educating his son about racism in Brazil. When asked by his son about João Freitas’ case, as they were eating lunch, Tenório said “I didn’t know what to say… I didn’t know how to tell him.” The author said to his son “sometimes, the world doesn’t like black people”.

== Works ==
- 2013 - The Kiss on the Wall (O beijo na parede)
  - The Kiss on the Wall tells the life of João, an 11-year-old who tries to get by in Porto Alegre, Rio Grande do Sul after moving from Rio de Janeiro because of the sudden death of his parents. While João narrates his own story, he is very optimistic, and ends up assuming the mantle of hero among his friends. João tries to find his place in society while he deals with his emotions, such as confusion and anger. Coming from an interracial family, the novel also approaches the topic of race from the lens of a youth.
- 2018 - Estela without God (Estela sem Deus)
  - Estela, the main character, is raised in a black family, which struggles with moving from town to town after being left by their father. As a coming of age novel, the book tells of her experiences with her first menstruation, sexuality, and the violence she has to face as a black female.
- 2020 - The Flipside of Skin (O avesso da pele)
  - The Flipside of Skin addresses family trauma as it focuses on the life experience of a black family living in Porto Alegre, Rio Grande do Sul. The narrator, Pedro, tells the life story of his father (Henrique) and his mother (Martha) through flashbacks. The novel takes the audience through Henrique's childhood, adolescence, and adult life until the moment of his death. Pedro reconstructs Henrique's life by filling in the blank spaces, using the memory of what his father taught him and from his own perspective as a black person. By doing so, Pedro creates connections between Henrique's death and the discrimination many Afro-Brazilians go through especially in the South of Brazil. The Flipside of Skin also approaches the themes of racism, poverty, unplanned pregnancy, raising the awareness of blackness, and cadomblé.

== Awards and prizes ==
- 15th “Poemas no ônibus”, (2007), winner
- 3rd “Poemas no trem”, (2007), winner
- 19th Paulo Leminski Short Story Contest (2008), Honorable mention, “Cavalos Não Choram”
- Prêmio Ages, 12th edition (2014), Book of the Year, O Beijo na Parede
- Prêmio Ages, 17th edition (2019), Book of the Year, Estela sem Deus
- Prêmio Minuano (2019), finalist for book Estela sem Deus
- Patron of the 66th Porto Alegre Book Fair (Feira do Livro), 2020
- Prémio Oceanos (2021), finalist for book O avesso da pele (The Flipside of Skin)
- Prêmio Jabuti, 63rd (2021), winner, for the book O avesso da pele (The Flipside of Skin)
