= Mirit Shem-Ur =

Israeli songwriter, journalist, and author

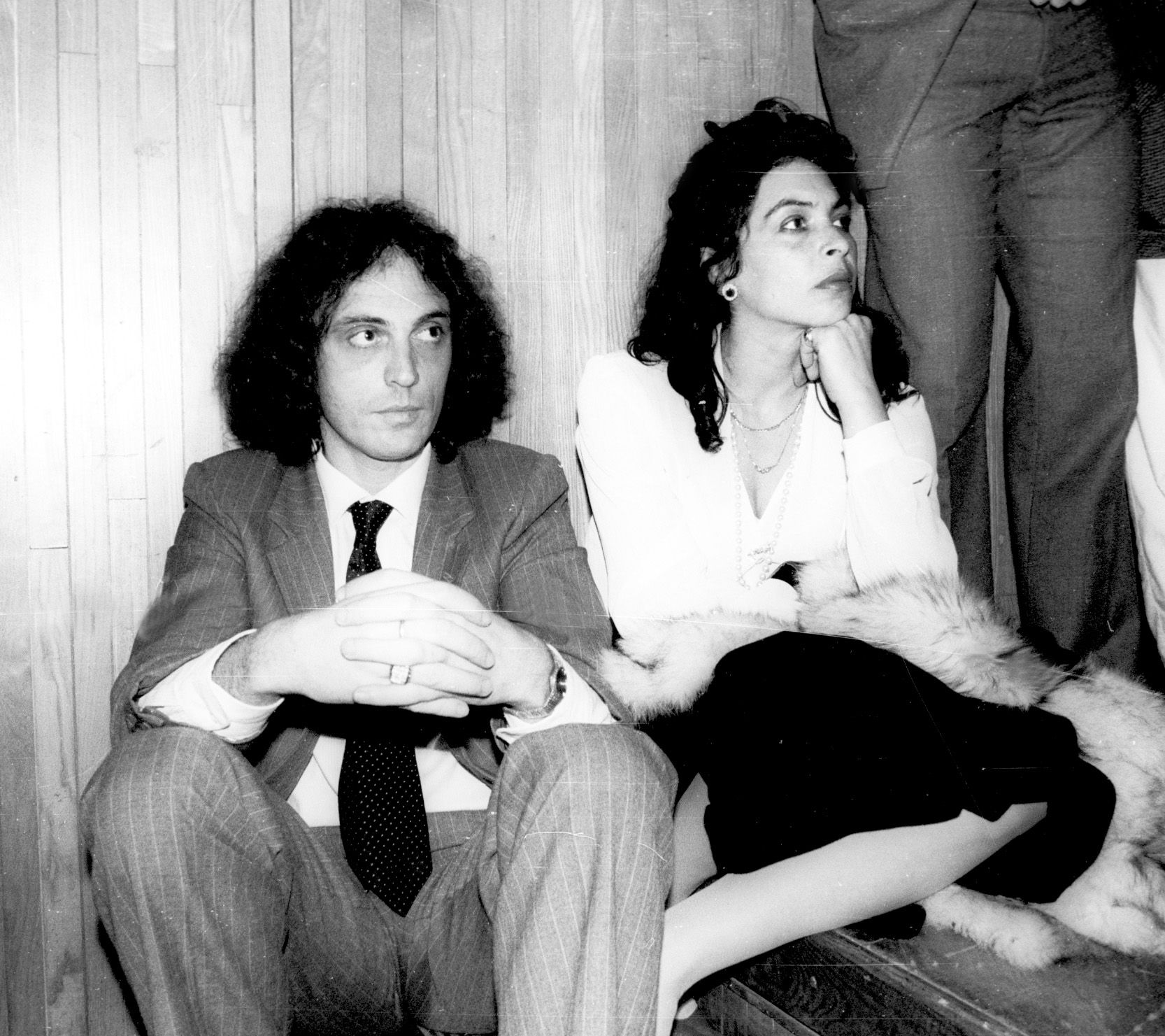
Svika Pick and Mirit Shem-Ur, 1986

Mirit Shem-Ur, also Mirit Shem-Or (Hebrew: מירית שם אור, born 23 April, 1948) is an Israeli songwriter, journalist, and author.

== Awards ==
- 2021: ACUM Award for Lifetime Achievement
  Jury's statement: "Mirit knew how to tell wonderful stories and describing complex human emotions in words poured into pop melodies. It is difficult not to be amazed by the expressiveness, linguistic richness and phonetic intelligence in immortal pop anthems such as: "Mary Lou", "Love at the End of Summer", "A Thousand Kisses", "Between the Fingers", "Live with Him", "The Heart", "The Rain Again", "Hot Blood", "Upwards", and the list is too long to include them all."

== Books ==
- 2021: איפה שאני (ISBN 978-1-61838-630-4)
  2023: translated as Where I Am (ISBN 195440414X)

== Family ==
Mirit is a daughter of writer and journalist Ora Shem-Ur and architect Ari Shem-Ur, sister of Yuval and Yonatan Shem-Ur and aunt of writer Dana Shem-Ur, actress Tamar Shem-Ur and journalist Bar Shem-Ur.

Mirit was married (1975–1995) to Svika Pick, with whom she has a son, and two daughters; Sharona Pick and Daniella Pick (married to Quentin Tarantino in 2018). Sharona and Daniella performed together as the Pick Sisters (2002–2005).
