= Dana Shem-Ur =

Israeli writer (born 1990)

- דנה שם-אור
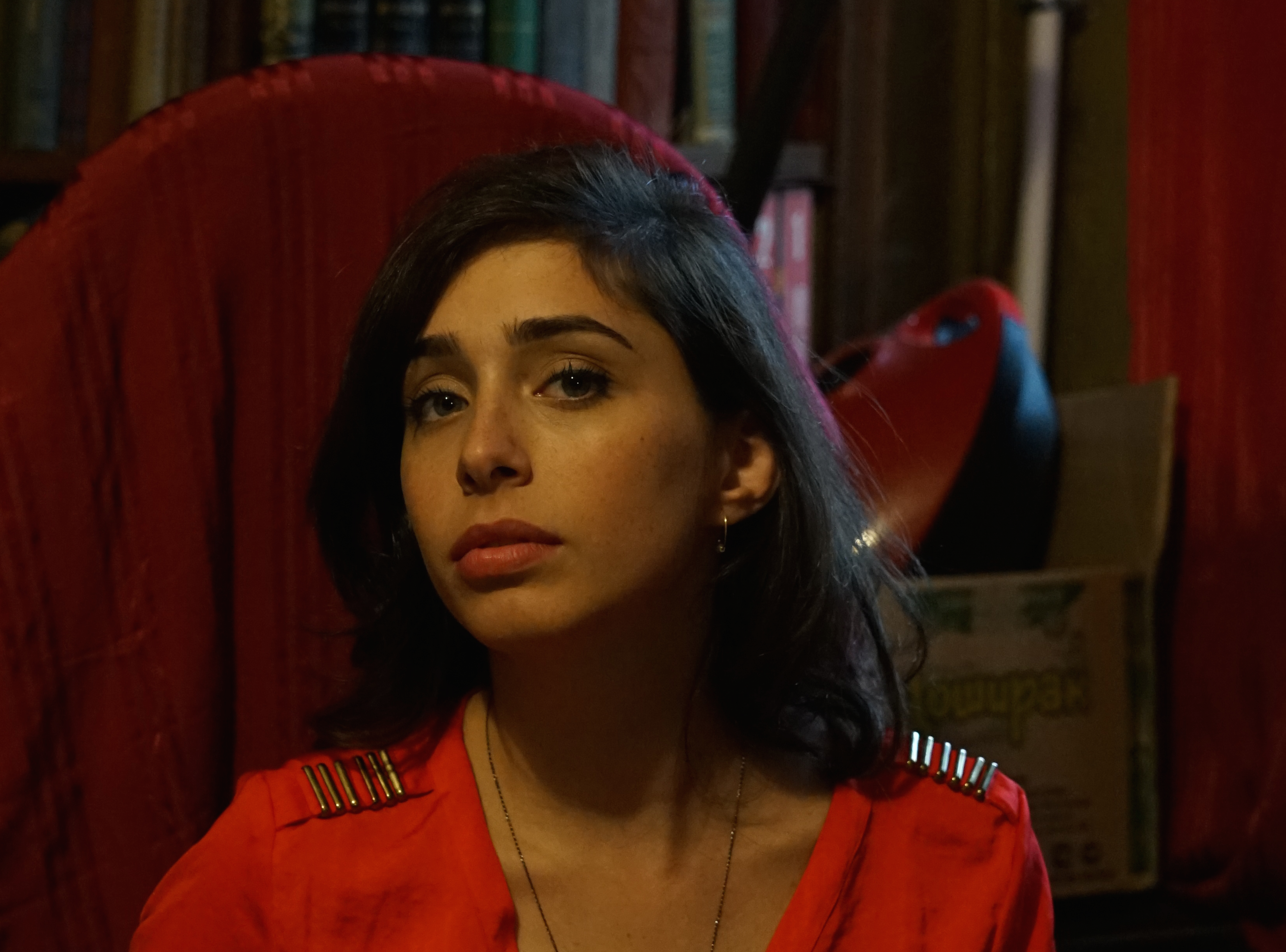
- Dana Shem-Ur
- Born: Dana Shem-Ur (דנה שם-אור); December 20, 1990 (age 35); Tel Aviv, Israel
- Education: Tel Aviv University, École Normale Supérieure
- Writing career
- Language: Hebrew
- Genre: novels

Dana Shem-Ur (Hebrew: דנה שם-אור; born December 20, 1990) is an Israeli writer, translator, researcher, and polyglot.

== Early life and education ==
Dana Shem-Ur was born in Tel Aviv, where she also grew up and was educated.

Shem-Ur is the daughter of writer and poet Anat Levit. Her grandmother is the writer and journalist Ora Shem-Ur. She is the niece of lyricist Mirit Shem-Ur and of journalist, playwright, and writer Yonatan Shem-Ur. She is also the cousin of lyricist and singer Sharona Pick, and the singer Daniella Pick, who is married to Quentin Tarantino.

Shem-Ur graduated with honors with a Bachelor of Arts degree in history from Tel Aviv University (2014). She then began studying for a Master degree in contemporary philosophy at the École Normale Supérieure, where she graduated with honors (2016). Shem-Ur had also studied at the Shanghai International University, and the University of Geneva, where she began doctoral studies in the department of theology, with a focus on the study of the philosophy of religion. She is currently a doctoral student in the Department of History at Tel Aviv University, where she investigates the American history of management in the 20th.

== Career ==
A self-taught polyglot, Shem-Ur has mastered eight languages: Chinese, Russian, French, Italian, German, Modern Greek, Japanese and English.

In 2021–2022, Shem-Ur was a research assistant in the Israel–China program at the Institute for National Security Studies in Tel Aviv (Israel).

Shem-Ur's first book, Where I Am, was published in 2021 by Pardes Publishing House in Israel. The book deals with the alienation and detachment of an Israeli translator living in Paris with her French husband and their child, and expresses the difficulty of immigrants in their new surrounding. An English edition of the book, translated by Yardenne Greenspan, was published in the United States in 2023 by New Vessel Press. Pulitzer Prize winner, author Joshua Cohen, said that this book "establishes Dana Shem-Ur as one of the rising stars of the new Israeli literature".

== Translation work ==
Dana Shem-Ur translates to Hebrew literary fiction and reference books from French, Italian, and Chinese. Among her translations:

- from Chinese: poems of Li Bai and Mu Xin and stories written by Chang Eileen.
- from Italian: works of Bruno Munari and Giorgio Agamben.
- from French: the novel Laissez-moi by Marcelle Sauvageot, and Jean-Michel Frodon’s book about Amos Gitai and the issue of archives.

== Awards and recognition ==
- Châteaubriand Prize for Excellence in the Humanities and Social Sciences from the French Embassy in Israel (2015/16).
