= Jean-Philippe Blondel =

French writer

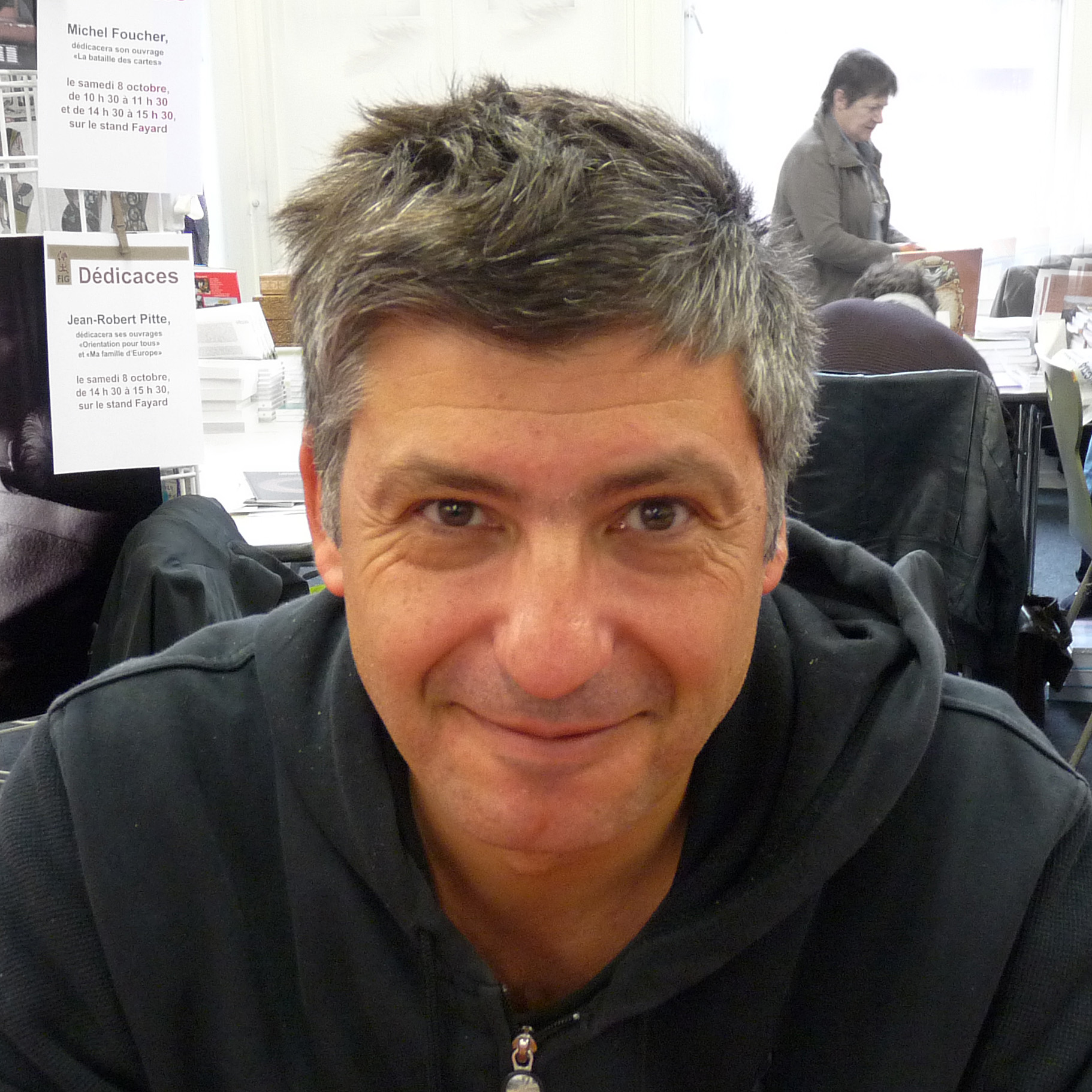
- Blondel in 2011
- Born: 16 October 1964 (age 61); Troyes, France
- Citizenship: French
- Occupations: French novelist, high school English teacher
- Writing career
- Language: French, English
- Genres: Young Adult, Fiction
- Notable work: The 6:41 to Paris

Jean-Philippe Blondel (born 16 October 1964) is a French novelist and high school English teacher. He was born in Troyes, about 200 km southwest of Paris, France.

== Biography ==
Blondel has taught at Lycée Edouard Herriot, a high school located in Sainte-Savine near his hometown of Troyes, since the 1990s. Blondel is not only a French author of young-adult and realistic fiction novels but also an English teacher. His most popular work, The 6:41 to Paris, has reached worldwide popularity and has been translated into ten languages. This widespread interest in his novels has led to opportunities for Blondel to travel abroad.

== Works in English ==
- 2010: A Place to Live ISBN 9781554514489.
- 2013: The 6:41 to Paris, translated by Alison Anderson in 2015 ISBN 9781939931269
- 2017: A Very French Christmas: The Greatest French Holiday Stories of All Time (Very Christmas), collaborative ISBN 978-1939931504
- 2019: Exposed, translated by Alison Anderson. ISBN 9781939931672
- 2023: Café Unfiltered, translated by Alison Anderson. ISBN 9781954404205

== Works in French ==
- 2003 : Accès direct à la plage, published by Delphine Montalant ISBN 978-2-9517997-3-8
- 2003 : 1979, published by Delphine Montalant ISBN 9782951-799776
- 2004 : Juke-box (novel), edited by Robert Laffont ISBN 978-2221102817
- 2005 : Un minuscule inventaire, edited by Robert Laffont ISBN 978-2221104422
- 2006 : Passage du gué, edited by Robert Laffont ISBN 978-2221107201
- 2007 : This is not a love song, edited by Robert Laffont ISBN 978-2221109359
- 2007 : Un endroit pour vivre, edited by Actes Sud Junior ISBN 2742770038
- 2009 : À contretemps, edited by Robert Laffont, Pocket in 2010 ISBN 2266198475
- 2009 : Au rebond, edited by Actes Sud Junior ISBN 2742779698
- 2010 : Le Baby-sitter (book), edited by Buchet-Chastel ISBN 2283024277
- 2010 : Blog, edited by Actes Sud Junior ISBN 2742789367
- 2010 : Qui vive? (a work about the photos of Florence Lebert), edited by Thierry Magnier ISBN 2844208428
- 2011 : G229, edited/published by Buchet/Chastel ISBN 2283024781
- 2011 : (Re)play!, edited by Actes Sud Junior ISBN 2742795979
- 2011 : Et rester vivant, edited/published by Buchet/Chastel ISBN 9782283025185
- 2011 : Brise-Glace, edited/published by Actes Sud Junior ISBN 9782283025185
- 2013 : 6h41, edited/published by Buchet/Chastel ISBN 2283026059
- 2013 : Double jeu, edited/published by Actes Sud Junior ISBN 2330022115
- 2014 : Un hiver à Paris, edited/published by Buchet/Chastel ISBN 2283026946
- 2015 : La Coloc, edited/published by Actes Sud JuniorISBN 2330048203
- 2016 : Mariages de saison, edited/published by Buchet/ChastelISBN 2283028396
- 2017 : Le Groupe, edited/published by Actes Sud Junior ISBN 2330075529
- 2018 : La Mise à nu, edited/published by Buchet/Chastel ISBN 2283031389

== Awards ==
2005: Marie-Claire-Blais Quebec-France Literary Prize for Accès Direct à la Plage

2007: Biblioblog Award for Passage du Gué

2008: Charles-Exbrayat Award for This is not a Love Song

2011: Amerigo Vespucci Youth Prize for Qui Vive?

2011: Feminine Virgin-Version Award for G-229

2013: Middle and High School Students of Charante Award for Brise Glace

2016: You Love to Read Award from Middle and High School Students of Mayenne for La Coloc
