= Cécile Desprairies =

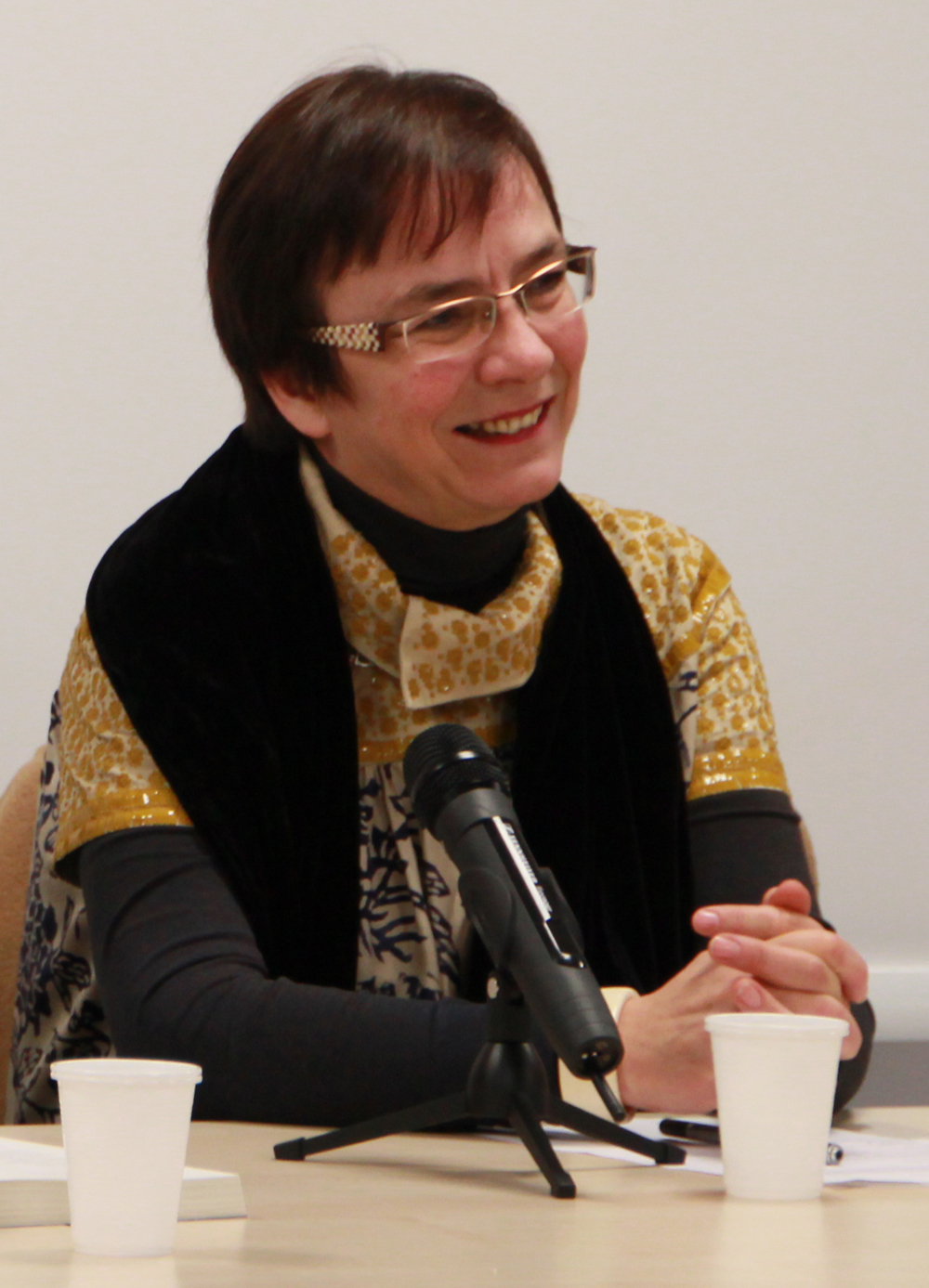

Cécile Desprairies is a French writer. Her works have focused on French collaboration with Nazi Germany during World War II.

== Works ==
In 2012, she released L'Héritage de Vichy - Ces 100 mesures toujours en vigueur, covering a number of laws passed by Vichy France that still had legal effect in France.

In 2019, she released a follow-up book, L'Héritage allemand de l'Occupation - Ces 60 dispositions toujours en vigueur, covering a number of measures imposed by Nazi Germany on occupied France that still had legal effect.

In 2023, she released her first novel, La Propagandiste. A work of autofiction, the novel dramatises her own family's history of collaboration, including her mother and her great-uncle. The novel received widespread acclaim, and was longlisted for the 2023 Prix Goncourt. An English translation, translated by Natasha Lehrer, was released in 2025. In 2025, Desprairies' brother and cousin sued her for defamation, accusing her of "a genuine act of family vengeance."
