= Caio Fernando Abreu =

Brazilian writer

Caio Fernando Loureiro de Abreu (September 12, 1948 – February 25, 1996), best known as Caio Fernando Abreu, was one of the most influential and original Brazilian writers of the 1970s and 1980s. Caio F., as he habitually signed his letters, was born in Santiago do Boqueirão in the state of Rio Grande do Sul in 1948, and died in Porto Alegre in 1996.

Abreu studied at the Universidade Federal do Rio Grande do Sul but abandoned academia before graduating to write for pop culture magazines such as Revista Nova, Revista Manchete, Revista Veja and Revista Pop. He was a prolific journalist and literary writer. He wrote short stories, novels, chronicles or crônicas, drama, and he also maintained throughout his life an extensive correspondence with other writers and artists, family and friends.

In 1968, Abreu was put on the wanted list by the DOPS or the Departamento de Ordem Política e Social, a repressive branch of the Brazilian government that operated during years when the repressive military dictatorship was in power, but found refuge at the country estate of Brazilian writer Hilda Hilst, located near the city of Campinas, in state of São Paulo. During the early '70s he spent one year in self-exile in Europe, spending time in England, Sweden, France, the Netherlands and in Spain.

In 1983, he relocated from his native Porto Alegre, the capital of Rio Grande do Sul, to the city of Rio de Janeiro; and in 1985, he moved to the city of São Paulo. Abreu then return again to France in 1994 where he found out that he was HIV positive. That same year, he returned home to Porto Alegre permanently to live with his parents. He enjoyed gardening before dying there two years later.

== Abreu's identities ==
Caio Fernando Abreu literature is a testimony of the culture, society and politics of Brazil in the 1970s and 1980s. As a journalist, he was an active cultural actor, writing reviews and chronicles for a number of Brazilian popular magazines. As a fictional writer, Abreu introduced new identities into the realm of Brazilian literature. His narratives come from the subjectivity of a bisexual man in his mid-forties who has AIDS. In Os dragões não conhecem o paraíso (Dragons), his most famous book of short stories, the majority of characters are either gay or they act as if they are. Examples of such identities are drag queens, gay teenagers, bisexual men, and other individuals whose sexualities and gender identities reside in the periphery of society. A number of literary critics have noted Abreu's attempt to create a Brazilian queer identity using the figures of monsters or dragons. The characters of books such as Os dragões não conhecem o paraíso (1988), Onde andará Dulce Veiga (1990) and Morangos mofados (1982) live and function in the periphery of society, they are in many ways equivalent to queer characters in North American literary traditions.

Brazilian cultural identity in Abreu's writings is anything but a fixed, essential entity, pure from foreign contamination. Abreu is a camp writer since his works are full of examples of queer sensibility, and of multiple appropriations of mainstream heterosexual society into queer narratives. His literature is inspired by writers such as Clarice Lispector and Julio Cortázar but also by Brazilian Popular Music MPB, Afro Brazilian music, Hollywood films, and North American literature and music. Abreu's Brazil is urban, queer, corrupt, isolated, but his main concern is the human existence in an urban setting.

Abreu's style of confessional literature captures his personal fears, hopes, sentiments and desires but, at the same time, his voice is both individual and collective. Abreu also introduced the topic of AIDS into Brazilian literature. The discourse of AIDS was already present in Abreu's writing from the beginning of the epidemic in the 1980s. He is, along with Cazuza and Renato Russo, one of the most recognized Brazilian artists to have died of AIDS.

== Abreu's works ==
His first novel, White Limit (1970) already had the markings of his literary trajectory: the anguish in the face of duty in the certainty of death at the end of his journey. According to his literary perspective, a life should be continually searched for.

== Abreu's work in film ==
Two of Abreu's short stories has been made into film: Aqueles Dois was made into a 1983 feature film directed by Sergio Amon and Sargento Garcia was made into a 2000 short film directed by Tutti Gregianin. Over the years, "Aqueles Dois" has enjoyed several theatre adaptations. His novel Onde Andará Dulce Veiga was also made into a feature film, released in Brazil in 2007 and directed by Abreu's friend Guilherme de Almeida Prado. Abreu also wrote the screenplay for Sergio Bianchi's 1988 feature Romance.

== Tribute ==
On 12 September 2018, to commemorate what would have been his 70th birthday, Google released a Google Doodle celebrating him.

== Bibliography ==
- Inventário do irremediável [Inventory of hopelessness], Brazil (1970, 1995).
- Limite branco [White limit], Brazil (1971, 1984, 1992).
- O ovo apunhalado [Stabbed egg], Brazil (1975, 1984, 1992).
- Pedras de Calcutá [Stones from Calcutá], Brazil (1977, 1995).
- Morangos mofados, Brazil (1982, 1995, 2005), Moldy Strawberries, translated by Bruna Dantas Lobato, USA, UK (2022).
- Triângulo das águas [Triangle of waters], Brazil, Prêmio Jabuti - 1983 (1983, 1993).
- As frangas [Pullets], Brazil (1988).
- Os dragões não conhecem o paraíso [Dragons don't know paradise], Brazil, Prêmio Jabuti - 1988 (1988).
- A maldição do Vale Negro [Curse of black valley], Brazil, Molière Price by Air France - 1988 (1988).
- Onde andará Dulce Veiga?, Brazil (1990), Whatever happened to Dulce Veiga?- A B novel, translated by Adria Frizzi, USA (2001).
- Bien loin de Marienbad [Quite distant from Marienbad], France (1994).
- Ovelhas negras [Black sheep], Brazil, Prêmio Jabuti - 1995 (1995).
- Mel & girassóis [Honey & Sunflowers], Brazil (1996).
- Teatro completo [Complete theatre], Brazil (1997).
- Cartas [Letters] (Caio Fernando Abreu & Ítalo Moriconi), Brazil (2002).

Theater

- O homem e a mancha [Man and the stain]
- Zona contaminada [Contaminated zone]

Translation

- A arte da guerra by Sun Tzu (Caio Fernando Abreu & Miriam Paglia), (1995).
- Assim vivemos agora by Susan Sontag (Caio Fernando Abreu), (1995).
- A Balada do Café Triste by Carson McCullers), (1991).

== See also ==
- Brazilian literature
- Clarice Lispector
- João Silvério Trevisan
