= Ersi Sotiropoulou =

Greek writer

Ersi Sotiropoulos (Greek: Έρση Σωτηροπούλου; born 1953) is a Greek writer.

She was born in Patras and lives in Athens. She authored Zigzag through the Bitter Orange Trees (English translation by Peter Green), which was the first novel to win both the Greek State Prize for Literature and Greece's Book Critics' Award. What’s Left of the Night (translated by Karen Emmerich) won the 2017 Prix Méditerranée Étranger in France while Emmerich’s English translation won the 2019 National Translation Award. Emmerich has also translated her short story collection Landscape with Dog. She is a 2024 James Merrill House Fellow.

== Novels (selected) ==
- Zigk-zagk stis nerantziés (1999)
- Damázontas to ktínos (2003)
- Éva (2009)
- Ti ménei apó ti nýchta (2015); Prix Méditerranée Étranger 2017
- Boreís (2017, «Μπορείς»)
