= Yao Feng =

Chinese poet and academic (born 1958)

Yao Feng OSE
- 姚風
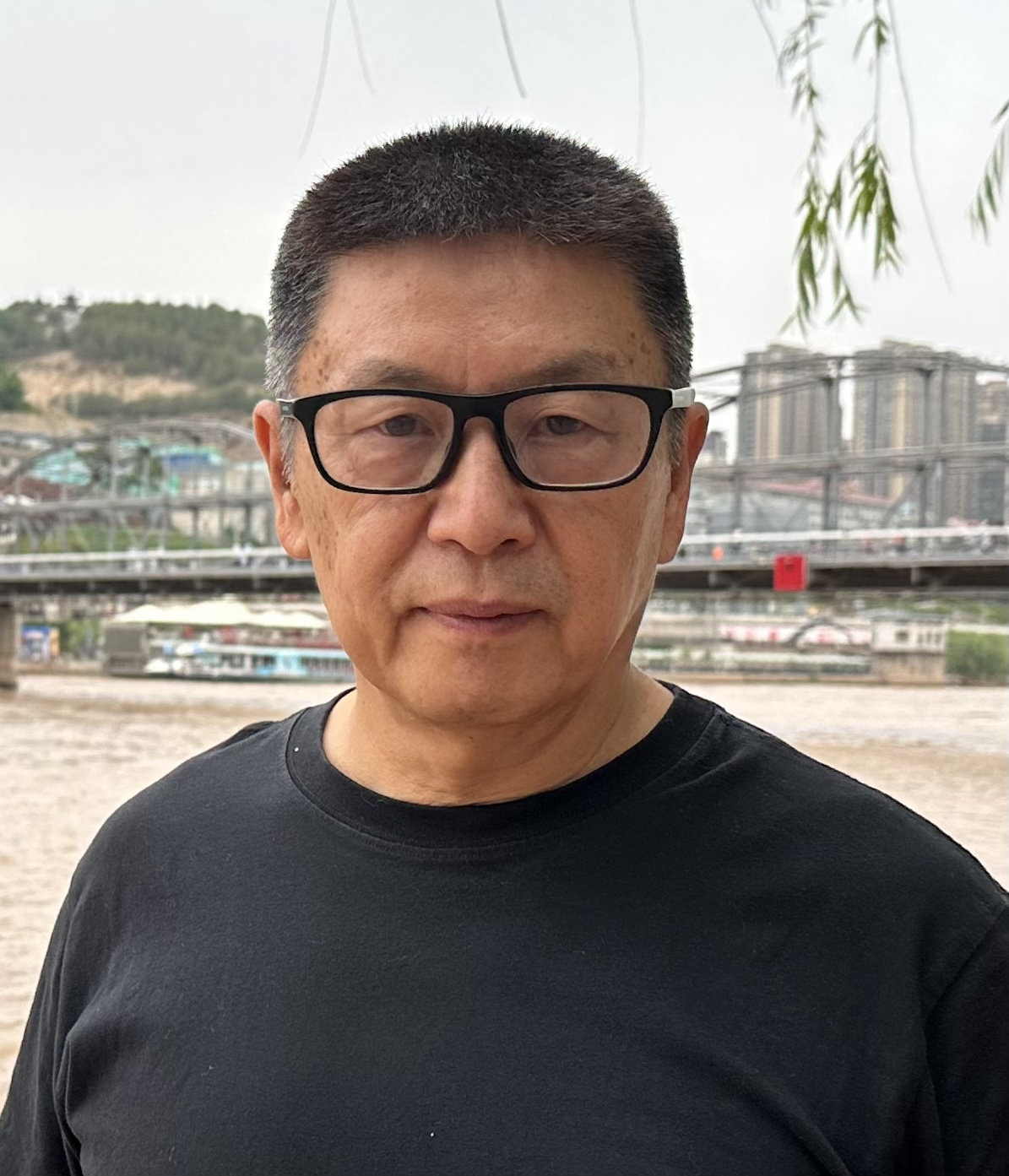
- Yao in 2023

Deputy Director of the Cultural Affairs Bureau of Macao
- In office September 2012 – July 2014 Serving with Liang Xiaoming
- Premier: Wen Jiabao; Li Keqiang
- Chief Executive: Fernando Chui

Personal details
- Born: Yao Jingming; 1958 (age 67–68) Beijing, China
- Education: Beijing Foreign Studies University (BA); University of Macau (MA); Fudan University (PhD)
- Occupation: Poet; translator; editor; university professor; photographer; artist; diplomat; government official

Yao Jingming OSE (Chinese: 姚京明; pinyin: Yáo Jīng Míng; Wade–Giles: Yao^{2} Ching^{1} Ming^{2}; born 1958), better known by the pen name Yao Feng (traditional Chinese: 姚風; simplified Chinese: 姚风; pinyin: Yáo Fēng; Wade–Giles: Yao^{2} Feng^{1}), is a Chinese poet, translator, photographer, artist and professor emeritus. He is formerly the director of Portuguese at the University of Macau. Yao is the founder and editor-in-chief of the poetry magazine Chinese and Western Poetry. He has published over 20 books in Portuguese and Chinese, and is also notable as a translator of the poetry of Eugénio de Andrade, Fernando Pessoa, Mário de Sá-Carneiro, Miguel Torga, Sophia de Mello Breyner Andresen, Florbela Espanca and Nuno Júdice, among others.

Yao also served as a diplomat for the Chinese government and later as a deputy director of the Cultural Affairs Bureau, an organ of the Secretary for Social Affairs and Culture within the Government of Macao Special Administrative Region.

== Biography ==
=== Early life and education ===
Yao was born in Beijing in 1958; his parents were factory workers. As a primary school student during the Cultural Revolution, Yao was a Little Red Guard. In 1969, he was selected as one of five or six students to study Spanish at Beijing Foreign Studies University, the first batch of students to be able to do so. He later recalled the first sentence he learnt to say was '¡Viva el presidente Mao!' ['Long live Chairman Mao!']. Yao's first poem in Spanish was entitled 'I Met Marilyn Monroe in China'. Working as an assistant to the school librarian, he discovered Herman Melville's Moby-Dick (1851) which made an indelible impression on him. At the age of 18, he was sent away to perform agricultural labour with his classmates as part of the Down to the Countryside Movement. He has referenced Jiang Wen's coming-of-age film In the Heat of the Sun (1994) as particularly accurate to his experience during this period.

=== Career ===
In 1976, Yao enrolled as an undergraduate at the Beijing Foreign Studies University (BFSU), studying Portuguese. Around this time, Yao began writing limericks. Upon these poems coming to the attention of an academic, he was tasked with translating Portuguese poetry at the BFSU's Southern European Studio. There he worked alongside notable translators Liu Mingjiu and Guo Hong'an. He graduated in 1981 with a bachelor's degree. He was subsequently assigned to research Portuguese literature at BFSU's National Research Centre for Foreign Language Education, where he worked until 1986.

Yao was seconded to the Chinese embassy in Lisbon as a translator in 1988. There, he befriended Portuguese poets, namely Maria Ondina Braga and Eugénio de Andrade, who encouraged him to publish his first poetry anthology, Written on the Wings of the Wind (1990). He did so under the pen name Yao Feng, which has the homophonic meaning of 'distant wind'.

In 1992, Yao began a two year contract teaching at the University of Macau, receiving a master's degree in Portuguese literature during this time. He went on to attain his doctorate in comparative literature from Fudan University in Shanghai. His thesis dealt with the representation of China in Portuguese poetry. In 1994, Yao and the academic Lin Baona commenced the 27-volume Portuguese-Language Writers Series, publishing renowned contemporary Portuguese writers in Chinese.

Yao founded the academic journal Chinese and Western Poetry in 2002. In honour of its 10 year anniversary, a series of symposia were organised by the Macau Foundation, Guangdong Writers Association and Zhuhai Writers Association, moderated by Yao. Among the participants was the literary critic Wang Jiaxin and poets Qiu Huadong, Lei Pingyang and Yan Ai-lin. During the discussions, Ezra Pound was mentioned as having significantly advanced Western interest in Chinese classical poetry.

In 2012, he later served as deputy director of the Cultural Affairs Bureau, resigning the position in 2014. The following year, Yao was a writer-in-residence at the University of Iowa, as part of the institutions International Writing Program. In 2016, Yao was appointed Director of Portuguese at the University of Macau, the first Chinese academic to be so named. As a critic of Portuguese literature, Yao has written on Pessoa, Fernão Mendes Pinto, Luís de Camões, Eça de Queirós and Camilo Pessanha. In 2024, he left the University of Macau, being named a professor emeritus.

=== Other activities ===
Yao has been described by artist Lin Jiangquan as a 'polymath', being an artist, photographer and curator besides his work as an academic and poet. Around 1999, he also had a small role in the television series Smoke Dragon playing a Chinese neurologist who falls in love with a Portuguese girl in Macau.

=== Personal life ===
Yao taught Mandarin to his friend and colleague José Luís Peixoto. Yao sometimes uses other pen names, including Hei Zhongming or Sibyl.

== Select bibliography ==
Portuguese-language publications
Year	Title	Title in English	Publisher	ISBN	Pages	Note
1990	Nas asas do vento cego	Written on the Wind	Átrio	9725990137	66	
2001	A noite deita-se comigo	The Night Lies Down with Me	Pedra Formosa Cultural Association	9728118325	89	As Yao Jingming.
2001	A poesia clássica Chinesa: uma leitura de traduçōes Portuguesas	Classical Chinese Poetry: A Reading of Portuguese Translations	University of Macau Press	9993726117	63	As Yao Jingming.
2004	Fragmentos: olhar de Henrique Senna Fernandes	Fragments: A Look at Henrique Senna Fernandes	Jorge Álvares Foundation / Macau International Institute	9993745073	117	As Yao Jingming; co-authored with Lúcia Lemos.
2007	Um barco remenda o mar: dez poetas Chineses contemporâneos	A Boat Mends the Sea: Ten Contemporary Chinese Poets	Martins Fontes	9788577070046	166	As co-editor with Régis Bonvicino.
2015	Palavras cansadas da gramática	Words Tired of Grammar	Gradiva	9789896166144	204	Poetry and photography.
2021	O além da montanha	Beyond the Mountain	Editora Moinhos	9786556811024	128	Poetry, prose and photography originally published in Ponto Final's literary supplement, Parágrafo.
2021	Contos de fantasia Chineses	Chinese Fantasy Stories	Editora Moinhos	9786556811079	400	As editor; written by Pu Songling; translated by Ana Cardoso, Zhang Mengyao, Chen Qu, Xiong Xueying, Lou Zhichang and Zhou Qian.
2025	O encontro dos extremos: intercâmbio literário entre a China e Portugal	The Meeting of Extremes: Literary Exchange Between China and Portugal	Gradiva	9789897853906	496	

Chinese-language publications
Year	Title	Title in English	Publisher	ISBN	Pages	Note
1997	《一條地平綫，兩種風景》	One Horizon Line, Two Views	Macau Official Printing Bureau	9729723575	221	Co-authored with Jorge Arrimar.
2007	《當魚閉上眼睛》	When Fish Close Their Eyes	Association of Stories of Macao	9789993789529	109	Co-authored with Christopher Kelen.
2011	《絕句》	In Brief	Hong Kong University Press	9789629965297	45	Chapbook; in Chinese and English. As part of the Words and the World series.
2014	《中外文學交流史—中葡卷》	History of Sino-Foreign Literary Exchanges: China-Portugal Volume	Shandong Education Press	9787532884926	294	As part of the National Key Publication Project; Portuguese edition translated by Ana Cristina Alves and published by Gradiva in 2025.
2014	《枯枝上的敵人》	Enemies on the Deadwood	Writers Publishing House	9789993711377	247	
2015	《我從你開始:——姚風讀詩》	I Begin With You: Yao Feng Reads Poetry	Macao Daily Press	9789996548161	243	
2015	《龍鬚糖萬歲》	Long Live Dragon Beard Candy	Writers Publishing House	9789993711759	403	
2015	《大海上的檸檬》	Lemons in the Sea	Zhejiang Literature and Art Publishing House	9787533944841	112	
2022	《深海點燈》	Lighting Up the Deep Sea	Showway Publishing Company	9789864457588	316	

== Honours and awards ==
- 2005: Yao won the 14th annual Rougang Poetry Prize, China's oldest prize for poetry.
- 2006: Yao was appointed to the Military Order of Saint James of the Sword, with the rank of Officer, by Aníbal Cavaco Silva, President of Portugal.
- 2013: Yao was awarded the 2nd Cross-Strait Poet Laureate Prize.

Additionally, Yao has been awarded the Changyao Poetry Award and the Macau Literary Award.

== Criticism and further reading ==
- Drumond Braga, Duarte (2026). "R. V. Pandit and Yao Feng: Two Asian Poets of the Image". In Piçarra, Maria do Carmo (ed.). Luso-Orientalism(s)—On Imagined Projections And Ruins: Visual Representations Of Former "Portuguese Asia". London: Palgrave MacMillan. pp. 309–330. doi:10.1007/978-3-032-03269-0_15. ISBN 978-3-032-03268-3.
- Infante, Gustavo (2013). "Macau: espaço geográfico e espaço literário-pessoal na poesia de Yao Jingming" [Macau: Geographical Space and Literary-Personal Space in the Poetry of Yao Jingming]. Fragmentum (in European Portuguese). 1 (35): 71–77. doi:10.5902/7868.
