= Cláudio Garrudo =

Portuguese photographer (born 1976)

- Born: 1976 (age 49–50); Lisbon
- Website: www.claudiogarrudo.com

Cláudio Garrudo (born in Lisbon in 1976), is a Portuguese photographer, cultural producer and editorial director.

== Life and work ==
Cláudio Garrudo graduated from the School of Social Communication, in Lisbon, between 1995 and 1999, attended an Erasmus program at Barcelona Universidad Autónoma, in Spain, between 1997 and 1998 and won a Leonardo da Vinci grant in Czech Republic.

He exhibited in Portugal, Spain, Czech Republic, Slovakia and Romania, participated in art fairs in Lisbon, Miami, New York City and Madrid. He won the first prize in the VII edition of the Biennial of Coruche and edited several photography books.

He co-founded and organizes Mapa das Artes, Bairro das Artes and PIPA – Programa da Imagem e da Palavra da Azinhaga, he's a member of the board of directors of the association Isto não é um cachimbo and editorial director of the National Press Ph. Series, where he has published Jorge Molder, Paulo Nozolino, Helena Almeida, Fernando Lemos, José M. Rodrigues, Ernesto de Sousa and Jorge Guerra.

His artistic work is based on the crossing of different territories such as painting and literature, and, in this context, we can highlight the series "Quintetos" with a text by Eduardo Lourenço, "Os Senhores do Bairro" with a text by Gonçalo M. Tavares and "Trindade" dedicated to Fernando Pessoa's Mensagem. His main interest is to explore this idea of "no frontier" in photography. He is represented in private collections in Portugal, Spain, Brazil, United Kingdom, Switzerland, Belgium and Romania and in the following institutional collections: MUDAS – Museum of Contemporary Art of Madeira, Museum of Neo-Realism, Collection of the Art Library of Calouste Gulbenkian Foundation, Municipal Museum of Coruche and Latin America House (in Lisbon). Cláudio Garrudo is represented by Galeria das Salgadeiras in Lisbon, Projekteria Art Gallery in Barcelona and guest artist at H'art Gallery in Bucharest.

== Selected exhibitions ==
=== Solo ===
2022. «Trinus». MUDAS – Museu de Arte Contemporânea da Madeira, Galeria. Calheta. Madeira. Portugal.

2021. «Sarkis». Galeria das Salgadeiras. Lisbon. Portugal.

2020. «Trinus». Casa da América Latina. Lisbon. Portugal.

2019. «Trinus». Projekteria Art Gallery. Barcelona. Catalonia. Spain.

2018. «Trinus». Galeria das Salgadeiras. Lisbon. Portugal.

2018. «LUZ CEGA». Travessa da Ermida. Lisbon. Portugal.

2016. «POSTER». Galeria das Salgadeiras. Lisbon. Portugal.

=== Collective ===
2022. «ATER», Projektera Art Gallery. Barcelona. Spain.

2021. «A Família Humana». Neo-Realism Museum. Vila Franca de Xira. Portugal.

2019. «ATER». Galeria das Salgadeiras. Lisbon. Portugal.

2017. «Regra e excepção». Galeria das Salgadeiras. Lisbon. Portugal.

2017. «Identidad». Galería Lucía Mendoza. Madrid. Spain.

2016. «Utopia, hoje». Museu Abílio. Óbidos. Portugal.

2016. «+ arte». Galería Lucía Mendoza. Madrid. Spain.

== Collections ==
MUDAS – Museu de Arte Contemporânea da Madeira

Lisbon's City Hall

NeoRealism Museum (Vila Franca de Xira)

Calouste Gulbenkian Foundation Art Library

Municipal Museum of Coruche

Latin America House

Private collections: Portugal, Spain, Brazil, United Kingdom, Switzerland, Belgium and Romania.

== Art Fairs ==
2022. «O outro lado do desenho». Galeria das Salgadeiras. Drawing Room Lisboa. Lisbon. Portugal.

2019. «The game of logic». Galeria das Salgadeiras. Just MAD Contemporary Art Fair. Madrid. Spain.

2018. «Deste lugar que é o silêncio». Galeria das Salgadeiras. Just LX Contemporary Art Fair. Lisbon. Portugal.

2016. Context Art New York. Galería Lucía Mendoza. New York. USA.

2015. Context Art Miami. Galería Lucía Mendoza. Miami. USA.

2015. 1º lugar. VII Bienal de Coruche. Coruche. Portugal.

2015. Summa Contemporary art fair, Galería Lucía Mendoza. Madrid. Spain.

2015. XVIII Bienal Internacional de Cerveira. Vila Nova de Cerveira. Portugal.

2015. Visionado de Portfolios Descubrimientos PhotoEspaña. Madrid. Spain.

2014. Emergentes DST, Festival Internacional de Fotografia "Encontros de Imagem". Braga. Portugal

2013. «XVIII Bienal de Artes Plásticas da Festa do Avante». Seixal. Portugal

2011. «XVII Bienal de Artes Plásticas da Festa do Avante». Seixal. Portugal

2009. «XVI Bienal de Artes Plásticas da Festa do Avante». Seixal. Portugal

== Books ==
2022. «Sarkis» with a text by Manuel João Vieira.

2019. «Trinus» with a text by Gonçalo M. Tavares + 10 Special Editions with photograph.

2018. «Luz cega» with a text by José Manuel dos Santos + 50 Special Editions with photograph.

2018. «Poster» with a text by Bárbara Coutinho, 100 numbered and signed copies.

2015. «Substantivo feminino» with a text by Vitor Nieves, 100 numbered and signed copies.

2014. «Quintetos» with a text by Eduardo Lourenço, 50 numbered and signed copies.

2010. «Díptico #01»

2007. «Mombeja, aldeia branca»

2007. «Greetings from Goa»
