= José Luís Peixoto =

Portuguese author, poet and playwright (born 1974)

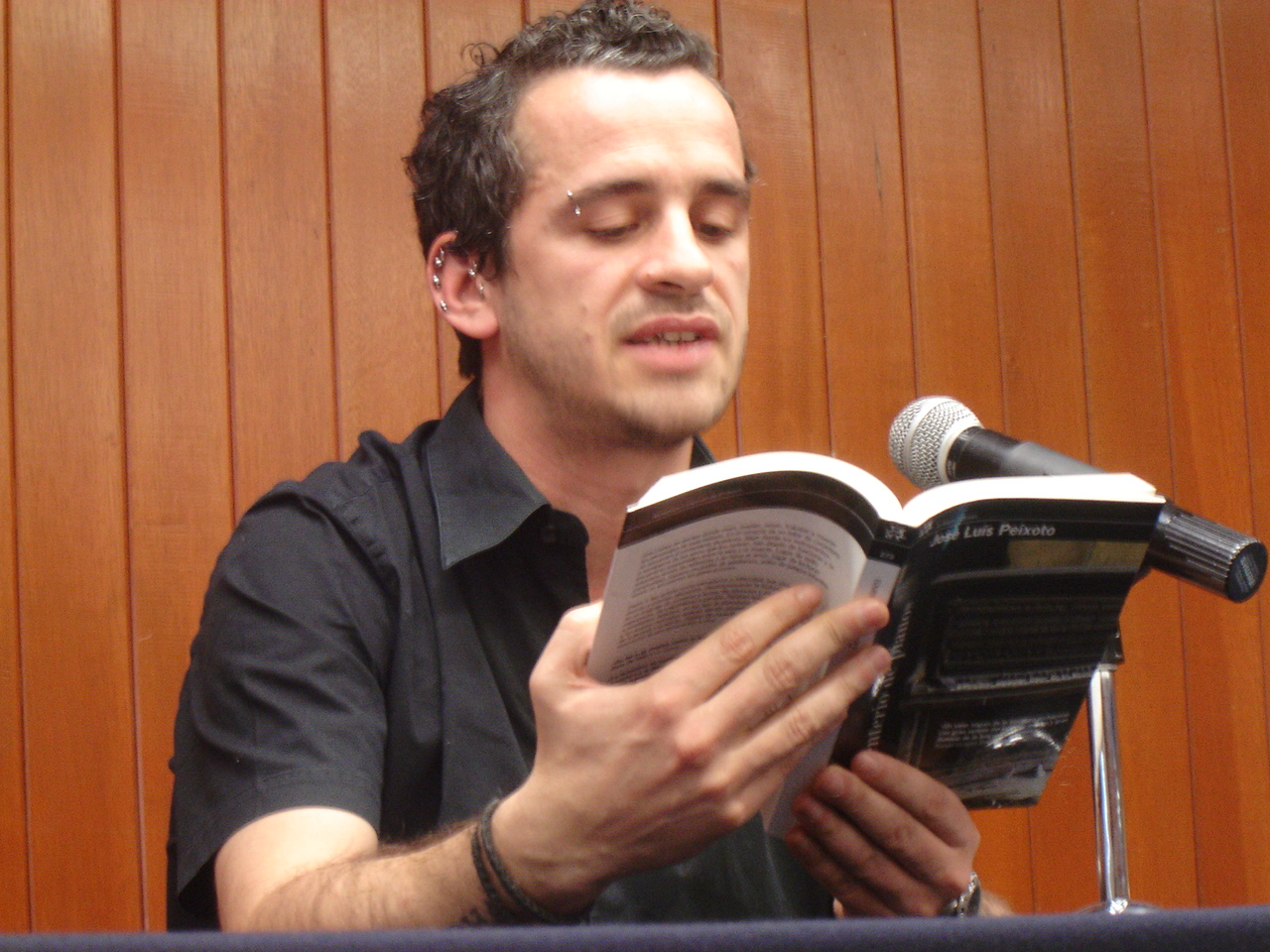
- José Luís Peixoto at the Universidad Nacional Autónoma de México in 2008
- Born: September 4, 1974 (age 51); Galveias, Ponte de Sor, Portugal
- Occupations: Novelist, poet, playwright
- Writing career
- Notable works: Morreste-me, Nenhum Olhar, Cemitério de Pianos, Livro, Dentro do Segredo, Galveias, Em Teu Ventre
- Notable awards: José Saramago Prize (2001); Oceanos Prize (2016)
- Website: joseluispeixoto.net

José Luís Marques Peixoto (Portuguese pronunciation: [ʒuˈzɛ luˈiʃ pɐjˈʃotu]; born September 4, 1974) is a Portuguese author, poet and playwright. A professional writer since 2001, his works have been translated into more than 30 languages.

== Biography ==
José Luis Peixoto was born in the village of Galveias, in the Portuguese region of Alentejo. He lived in Galveias until the age of 18. He obtained a bachelor's degree in modern languages and literature from NOVA University Lisbon. After university, he was a teacher for some years in several schools in Portugal and Cape Verde, before becoming a professional writer in 2001.

Peixoto's first book, Morreste-me (English title: You Died on Me), was published in 2000. In 2001, he became the youngest ever recipient of the José Saramago Prize, at the age of 27, for his novel Nenhum Olhar.

Piexoto is a student of Mandarin, taught by the poet Yao Feng.

== International editions ==
Translated editions of Peixoto's books are available from the following publishers: Bloomsbury (UK), Doubleday, Random House (US), Grasset, Seuil (France), Literatura Random House (Spanish-speaking countries), Companhia das Letras (Brazil), Einaudi (Italy), Kedros (Greece), Meulenhoff, Atlas Contact (Nederlands), Kineret (Israel), Wsoy (Finland), Polirom (Romania), Bozicevic (Croatia), Bakur Sulakauri (Georgia), Kontrast (Serbia), among others.

== Awards ==
- 2001: José Saramago Prize, for Nenhum Olhar (best novel published in all Portuguese speaking countries on the two previous years)
- 2007: Premio Cálamo, for Cemitério de Pianos (best foreign novel published in Spain in 2007)
- 2008: Prémio de Poesia Daniel Faria, for Gaveta de Papéis (best poetry book published in Portugal by a poet under 35 years old)
- 2013: Prémio da Sociedade Portuguesa de Autores, for A Criança em Ruínas (best poetry book published in Portugal on the previous year)
- 2013: Premio Salerno Libro d'Europa, for Livro (best novel published in Europe in 2012)
- 2016: Oceanos Prize, for Galveias (best novel published in all Portuguese-speaking countries in 2015)
- 2019: The Best Translation Award-Japan for Galveias (best foreign novel translated into Japanese in 2019)

== Bibliography ==
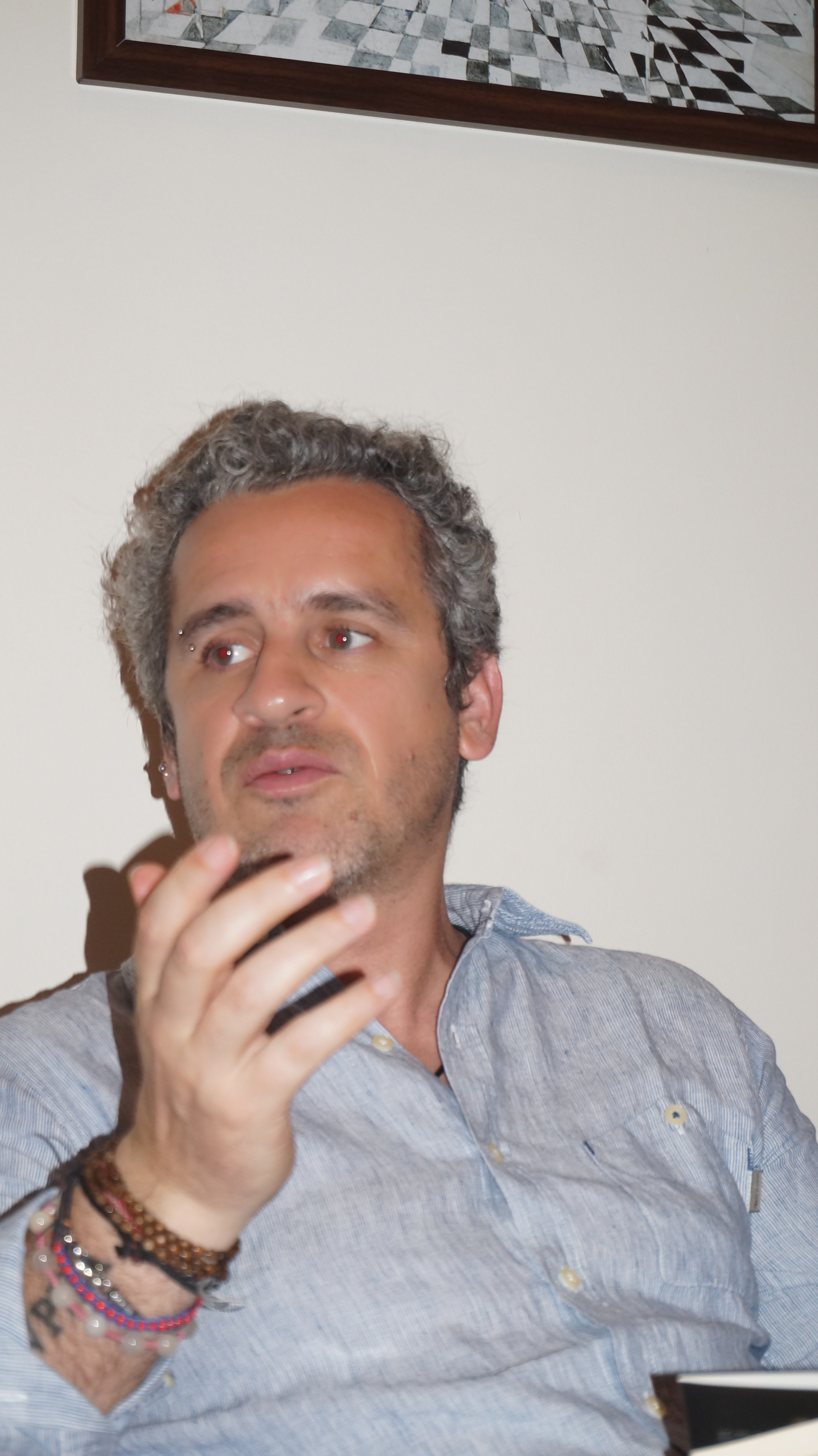
Peixoto in Goa, in 2017

=== Novels ===
- 2000: Nenhum Olhar (English titles: Blank Gaze (UK), The Implacable Order of Things (US))
- 2002: Uma Casa na Escuridão
- 2006: Cemitério de Pianos (English title: The Piano Cemetery)
- 2010: Livro
- 2014: Galveias
- 2015: Em Teu Ventre
- 2019: Autobiografia
- 2021: Almoço de Domingo

=== Short-novels/fictional narrative ===
- 2000: Morreste-me (English title: You Died on Me)
- 2003: Antídoto
- 2008: Cal
- 2011: Abraço
- 2022: Onde

=== Poetry ===
- 2001: A Criança em Ruínas
- 2002: A Casa, a Escuridão
- 2008: Gaveta de Papéis
- 2020: Regresso a Casa

=== Travel literature ===
- 2012: Dentro do Segredo: Uma viagem na Coreia do Norte
- 2017: O Caminho Imperfeito

=== Children's literature ===
- 2012: A Mãe que Chovia
- 2016: Todos os Escritores do Mundo Têm a Cabeça Cheia de Piolhos
