= Ondjaki =

Angolan writer

Ndalu de Almeida
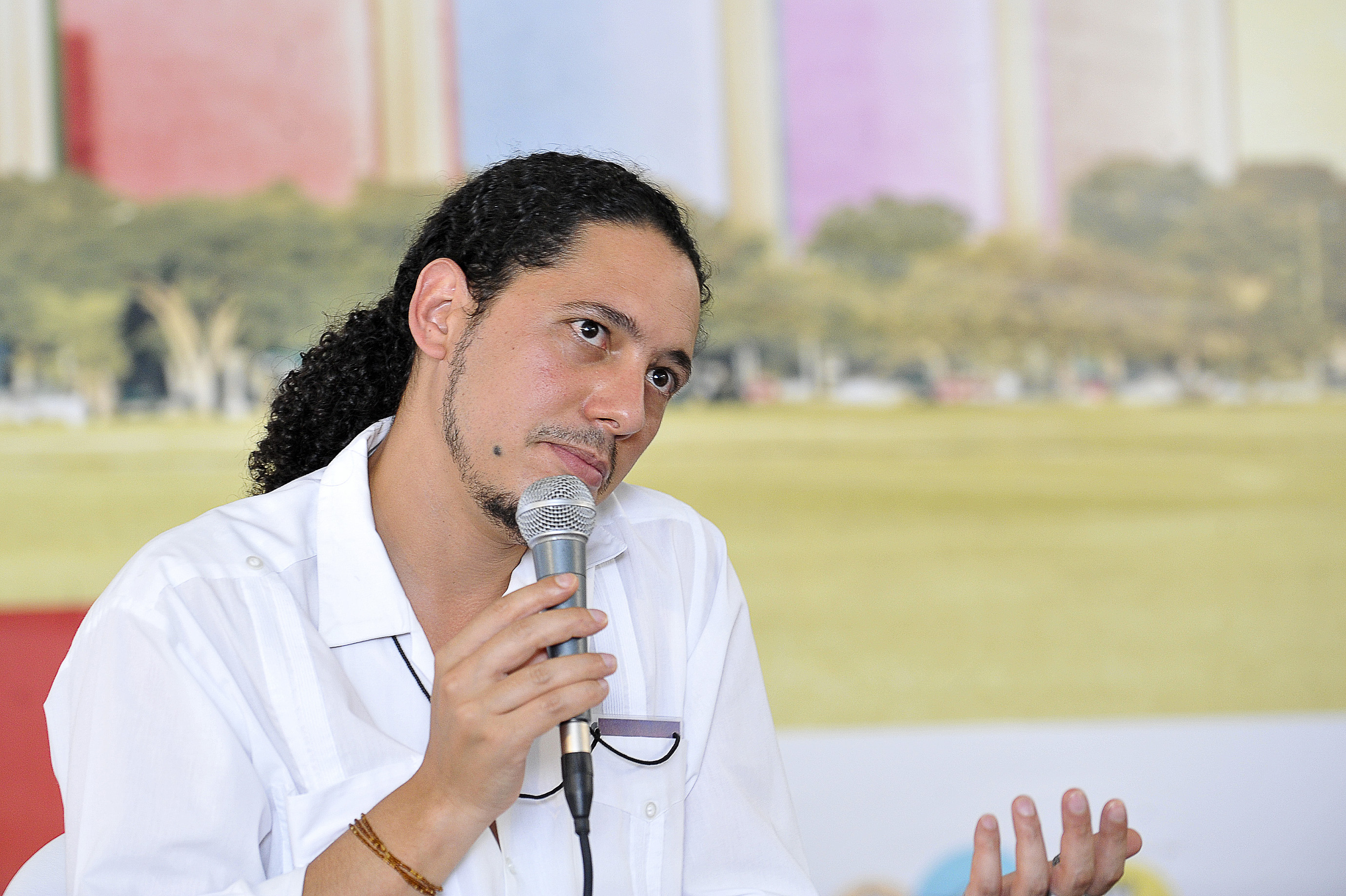
- Ondjaki in 2012
- Born: 5 July 1977 (age 49); Luanda, Angola
- Occupation: Writer
- Writing career
- Pen name: Ondjaki
- Language: Portuguese
- Period: Post-Colonial Africa
- Notable work: Os Transparentes
- Notable awards: Prémio Literário António Paulouro (2005) Grande Prémio de Conto Camilo Castelo Branco (2007); Grinzane for Africa Prize (2008); Prémio Jabuti de Literatura (2010); José Saramago Prize (2013) Prémio Littérature-Monde (2016)

Ndalu de Almeida (born July 5, 1977) is a writer born in Angola who uses the pen name Ondjaki. He has written poetry, children's books, short stories, novels, drama and film scripts.

== Career ==
Ondjaki studied sociology at the University of Luanda, and wrote his thesis on Angolan writer Luandino Vieira. In 1999, he received his Doctorate in African Studies. Ondjaki's literary debut came in 2000 with the poetry book Actu Sanguíneu, which was followed up with the childhood memoir Bom dia, camaradas ("Good Morning, comrades"), in 2001. To date (2024) his body of work includes five novels, four collections of short stories, six collections of poetry and six children's books. He has also made a documentary film, May Cherries Grow, about his native city. His books have been translated to French, Spanish, Italian, German, Serbian, English, Polish and Swedish. Grandma Nineteen and the Soviets' Secrets is his most recent book in English (Spring 2014).

In 2008 Ondjaki was awarded the Grinzane for Africa Prize in the category of Best Young Writer. In 2012, he was named by Zukiswa Wanner in The Guardian as one of the "top five African writers" (alongside Léonora Miano, H. J. Golakai, Chika Unigwe and Thando Mgqolozana). He is one of 39 writers aged under 40 from sub-Saharan Africa who in April 2014 were chosen as part of the Hay Festival's prestigious Africa39 project.

In October 2010 he won the Premio Jabuti, in the juvenile category, with the book AvóDezanove e o Segredo do Soviético. In 2013 he was awarded the José Saramago Prize for his novel Os Transparentes.

== Awards and recognition ==
- 2008: Grinzane for young writer Prize - Ethiopia
- 2010: literatura em lingua portuguesa Prize - by FNLIJ, Brazil, for AvóDezanove e o segredo do soviético (available in English, in Canada)
- 2010: São Paulo Prize for Literature — shortlisted in the Best Book of the Year category for Avó Dezanove e o Segredo do Soviético
- 2010: Jabuti Prize - Brazil, for AvóDezanove e o segredo do soviético
- 2011: Caxinde do conto infantil Prize - Angola, for Ombela, a estória das chuvas
- 2012: Bissaya Barreto Prize - Portugal, for A bicicleta que tinha bigodes
- 2013: literatura em lingua portuguesa Prize - by FNLIJ, Brazil, for A bicicleta que tinha bigodes
- 2013: José Saramago Prize - with Os Transparentes
- 2014: Selected as part of the Hay Festival's Africa39 project featuring 39 writers from sub-Saharan Africa aged under 40.
- 2014: literatura em lingua portuguesa Prize - by FNLIJ, Brazil, for Uma escuridão bonita
- 2014: Jabuti Prize (juvenile category, 3rd place) - Brazil, for Uma escuridão bonita
- 2016: Littérature-Monde 2016 (non-French literature, for 'Transparent city')
- 2023: Vergílio Ferreira prize (Évora University)
- 2023: best book in foreign literature (BRAZIL, FNLIJ 2023, com "o livro do deslembramento")

== Works in translation ==
- Italy
  - “Il Fischiatore” - [O Assobiador] Publisher: Lavoro, 2005; Translation: Vincenzo Barca
  - “Le aurore della notte” - [Quantas madrugadas tem a noite] Publisher: Lavoro, 2006; Translation: Vincenzo Barca
  - “Buongiorno compagni!” - [Bom dia Camaradas] Publisher: Iacobelli, 2011; Translation: Livia Apa
  - “NonnaDiciannove e il segreto del sovietico” - [Avó Dezanove e o segredo do soviético] Publisher: Il Sirente, 2015; Translation: Livia Apa
- Uruguay
  - “Buenos días camaradas” - [Bom dia Camaradas] Publisher: Banda Oriental, 2005; Translation: Ana García Iglesias
- Switzerland
  - “Bonjour Camarades” - [Bom dia Camaradas] Publisher: La Joie de Lire (French rights), 2005; Translation: Dominique Nédellec
  - “Bom Dia Camaradas: Ein Roman aus Angola” Publisher: NordSüd 2006; Translation: Claudia Stein
  - “Ceux de ma rue” - [Os da minha rua] Publisher: La Joie de Lire, 2007; Translation: Dominique Nédellec
- Spain
  - “Y si mañana el miedo” - [E se amanhã o medo] Publisher: Xordica, 2007; Translation: Félix Romeo
  - “Buenos dias camaradas” - [Bom dia Camaradas] Publisher: Txalaparta, 2010; Translation: Ana García Iglesias
- United Kingdom
  - “The Whistler” - [O Assobiador] Publisher: Aflame Books, 2008; Translation: Richard Bartlett
- Canada
  - “Good Morning Comrades” - [Bom dia Camaradas] Publisher: Biblioasis (rights for Canada/USA), 2008; Translation: Stephen Henighan
  - “Granma Nineteen and the Soviet’s Secret” - [Avó Dezanove e o segredo do soviético] Publisher: Biblioasis (rights for Canada/USA), 2014; Translation: Stephen Henighan
  - Transparent City - [Os transparentes] Publisher: Biblioasis (rights for Canada/USA), 2018; Translation: Stephen Henighan
- Mexico
  - “Buenos dias camaradas” - [Bom dia Camaradas] Publisher: Almadía, 2008; Translation: Ana García Iglesias
  - Los transparentes - [Os transparentes] Publisher: 2014; Translation: Ana García Iglesias
- Argentina
  - “El Silbador” - [O Assobiador] Publisher: Letranómada, 2011; Translation: Florencia Garramuño
  - Los transparentes - [Os transparentes] Publisher: Letranómada, 2014
- Serbia
  - “Dobar dan, drugovi” - [Bom dia Camaradas] Publisher: Krativni centar, 2009; Translation: Ana Kuzmanović-Jovanović
- Sweden
  - [O Assobiador] Publisher: Tranan, 2009; Translation: Yvonne Blank
  - [Bom dia camaradas] Publisher: Tranan, 2010; Translation: Yvonne Blank
  - [Ynari: a menina das cinco tranças] Publisher: Tranan, 2010; Translation: Yvonne Blank
- Cuba
  - “Buenos dias, compañeros” - [Bom dia Camaradas] Publisher: Editorial Gente Nueva, 2010; Translation: Ana Garcia Iglesias
- Poland
  - [Avó Dezanove e o segredo do soviético] Publisher: Karakter 2012
- France
  - Les Transparent - [Os transparentes] Publisher: Métailié, 2015; Translation: Danielle Schramm
- Germany
  - Die Durchsichtigen - [Os transparentes] Publisher: Wunderhorn, 2015; Translation: Michael Kegler
- United States
  - Our Beautiful Darkness - [Uma escuridão bonita] Publisher: Enchanted Lion Books, 2024; Translation: Lyn Miller-Lachmann; Illustration: António Jorge Gonçalves
- Estonia
  - VanaemaÜheksa ja soveti saladus - [Avó Dezanove e o segredo do soviético] Publisher: Kultuurileht, 2024; Translation: Leenu Nigu

== Bibliography ==
- Actu Sanguíneu (poetry, 2000)
- Bom Dia Camaradas (novel, 2001) - available in Cuba, Uruguay, Mexico, Spain, Switzerland, France, Canada, USA, Serbia, Italy, Sweden (translations)
- Momentos de Aqui (short stories, 2001)
- O Assobiador (novella, 2002) - available in English translation; Sweden, Italy, Argentina (translations)
- Há Prendisajens com o Xão (poetry, 2002)
- Ynari: A Menina das Cinco Tranças (children's, 2004) - available in Sweden
- Quantas Madrugadas Tem A Noite (novel, 2004) - available in Italy
- E se Amanhã o Medo (short stories, 2005) - available in Spain (translation)
- Os da minha rua (short stories, 2007) - available in Switzerland and France (translation)
- Avó Dezanove e o segredo do soviético (novel, 2008) - available in English translation, Canada & US; also in Italy, Poland (translations)
- O leão e o coelho saltitão (children's, 2008)
- Materiais para confecção de um espanador de tristezas (poetry, 2009)
- O voo do Golfinho (children's, 2009)
- Dentro de mim faz Sul, seguido de Acto sanguíneo (poetry, 2010)
- A bicicleta que tinha bigodes (young adult, 2011)
- Os transparentes (novel, 2012) - translations available in Mexico, Argentina, France, Germany (soon)
- Uma escuridão bonita (young adult, 2013)
- Sonhos azuis pelas esquinas (short stories, Portugal/Caminho, 2014)
- Os vivos, o morto e o peixe frito (theatre, 2014)
- O céu não sabe dançar sozinho (short stories, Brazil/Lingua Geral, 2014)
- O Carnaval da Kissonde (children's, Portugal, 2015)
- Os modos do mármore (poetry, Galiza, 2015)
- Verbetes para um dicionário afetivo (co-author; Portugal, 2015)
- O convidador de pirilampos (children's, Portugal, 2017)
- Há gente em casa (poetry, Portugal, 2018)
- A estória do Sol e do Rinoceronte (children´s, Portugal, 2020)
- O livro do Deslembramento (novel, Angola, 2020)
- Durante o adeus das andorinhas (essays, with photos by Jordi Burch, Portugal/ Brazil, 2026).
