= UMAR (women's organization) =

Portuguese women's rights organization

UMAR – Alternative and Answer Women's Union
- UMAR – União de Mulheres Alternativa e Resposta
- Abbreviation: UMAR
- Formation: September 12, 1976; 49 years ago
- Founder: Isabel Lhano
- Type: Non-governmental organization
- Purpose: Activism for women's rights
- Headquarters: Lisbon
- Official language: Portuguese
- Website: feminismos.umar.pt
- Formerly called: Antifascist and Revolutionary Women's Union (1976-1989); Movement for the Emancipation of the Portuguese Women (1989-1999)

UMAR, an acronym which stands for Alternative and Answer Women's Union in Portuguese (União de Mulheres Alternativa e Resposta), is a Portuguese women's rights organization founded in 1976.

From 1976 to 1989, the acronym originally stood for Antifascist and Revolutionary Women's Union (União de Mulheres Antifascistas e Revolucionárias). In 1989, the organization changed its name to Movement for the Social Emancipation of the Portuguese Women (Movimento para a Emancipação Social das Mulheres Portuguesas) and again, in 1999, to the name it currently holds.

The organization was founded by members of the far-left party People's Democratic Union (nowadays part of the Left Bloc), but was always completely autonomous from the party.

== See also ==
- Women in Portugal
- List of women's organizations
