= Jerusalém =

Book by Gonçalo M. Tavares

Jerusalém is the third novel in the Kingdom series by Portuguese writer Gonçalo M. Tavares, published in 2005 by Círculo de Leitores. Jerusalém has been included in the European edition of 1001 Books to Read Before You Die. An English translation was published in 2009.

It won the Ler Millennium bcp prize and the 4th edition of the José Saramago Prize, in 2004. It is currently published by Editorial Caminho.

== Plot ==
The work is structured in micro-stories about personal stories in different times—present, past, and future—in a mixture of suffering, horror, and madness. It is a dense analysis of social functioning when on the edge of sanity.
