= Valter hugo mãe =

Portuguese writer

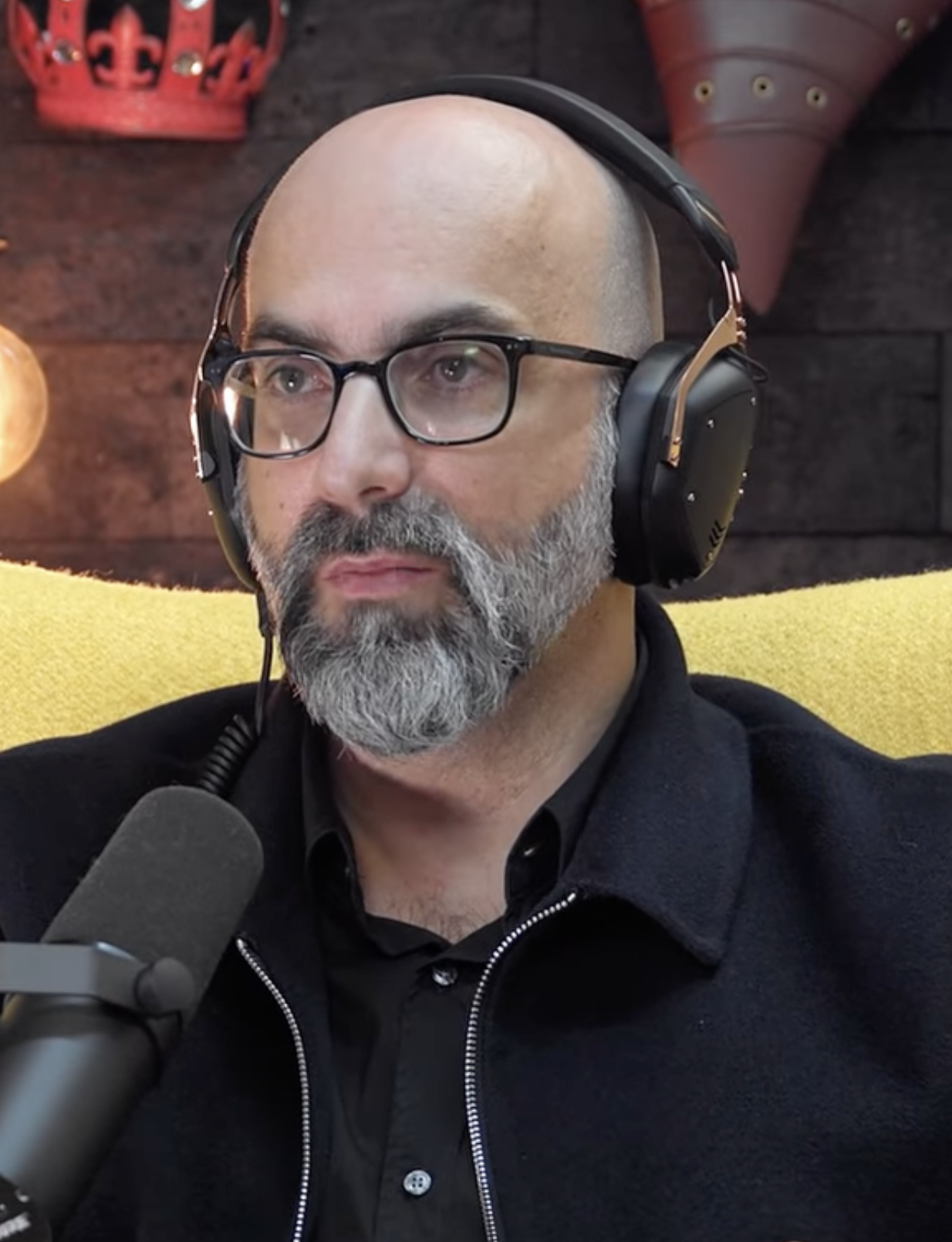
- Hugo Mãe in 2020
- Born: September 25, 1971 (age 54); Henrique de Carvalho, Colonial Angola
- Occupations: Writer, singer, plastic artist
- Writing career
- Genres: novel, poetry

Valter hugo mãe is the artistic name of the Portuguese writer Valter Hugo Lemos (born September 25, 1971). He is also an editor, singer and plastic artist. Valter hugo mãe received the José Saramago Prize in Literature in 2007 for his novel o remorso de baltazar serapião.

== Biography ==
Valter hugo mãe (which he intentionally writes in small caps, like his own work), was born in Henrique de Carvalho, in colonial Angola. He spent his childhood in Paços de Ferreira, and in 1980 he moved to Vila do Conde. He graduated in Law, and did post-graduate work in Modern and Contemporary Portuguese literature.

Valter hugo mãe achieved public recognition in 2007 by winning the José Saramago Prize. During the prize ceremony José Saramago called the novel o remorso de baltazar serapião a true literary tsunami.

Besides writing, he has dedicated effort to drawing, with a first public exhibition in 2007 in Porto, and also to music, being the singer in the band O Governo.

== Bibliography ==
Poetry

- silencioso corpo de fuga. A Mar Arte. Coimbra: 1996.
- o sol pôs-se calmo sem me acordar. A Mar Arte. Coimbra; 1997.
- entorno a casa sobre a cabeça. Silêncio da Gaveta Edições. Vila do Conde: 1999.
- egon schielle auto-retrato de dupla encarnação. Associação dos Jornalistas e Homens de Letras do Porto. Porto: 1999.
- estou escondido na cor amarga do fim da tarde. Campo das Letras. Porto: 2000.
- três minutos antes de a maré encher. Quasi Edições. V.N. Famalicão: 2000.
- a cobrição das filhas. Quasi Edições. V.N. Famalicão: 2001.
- útero. Quasi Edições. V.N. Famalicão: 2003.
- o resto da minha alegria seguido de a remoção das almas. Cadernos do Campo Alegre. Porto: 2003.
- livro de maldições. Objecto Cardíaco. Vila do Conde: 2006.
- pornografia erudita. Edições Cosmorama. Maia: 2007.
- bruno. Littera Libros. Badajoz (Espanha): 2007.
- folclore íntimo. Edições Cosmorama. Maia: 2008.
- contabilidade. Objectiva (Alfaguara). Lisboa: 2010.

Novel

- o nosso reino. Temas e Debates. Lisboa: 2004. / Objectiva (Alfaguara). Lisboa: 2011. Porto Editora. Porto: 2015
- o remorso de baltazar serapião. QuidNovi. Porto: 2006. / Objectiva (Alfaguara). Lisboa: 2011. Porto Editora. Porto: 2015
- o apocalipse dos trabalhadores. QuidNovi. Porto: 2008. / Objectiva (Alfaguara). Lisboa: 2011.
- a máquina de fazer espanhóis. Objectiva (Alfaguara). Lisboa: 2010.
- o filho de mil homens. Objectiva (Alfaguara). Lisboa: 2011. Porto Editora. Porto: 2015
- A Desumanização. Porto Editora. Porto: 2013.
- As Doenças do Brasil. Porto Editora. Porto: 2021.
- Deus na Escuridão. Porto Editora. Porto: 2024.
- O século dos imbecis. Porto Editora, Porto: 2026.

Children's Literature

- A Verdadeira História dos Pássaros. Booklândia (QuidNovi). Porto: 2009.
- A História do Homem Calado. Booklândia (QuidNovi). Porto: 2009.
- o rosto. Objectiva (Alfaguara). Lisboa: 2010. (ilustrações de Isabel Lhano)
- As mais belas coisas do mundo. Objectiva (Alfaguara). Lisboa: 2010. (ilustrações de Paulo Sérgio Beju)
- O paraíso são os outros. Porto Editora. Porto: 2014. (ilustrações de Esgar Acelerado)

Other publications

- O Futuro em Anos-Luz. 100 Anos. 100 Poetas. 100 Poemas. Quasi Edições. V.N. Famalicão: 2001. (antologia poética – selecção e organização)
- Série Poeta. Quasi Edições. V.N. Famalicão: 2001. (antologia poética, dedicada a Júlio/Saúl Dias – selecção e organização)
- A Alma não é Pequena – 100 Poemas Portugueses para sms. Edições Centro Atlântico. V.N. Famalicão: 2003. (antologia poética – selecção e organização, com Jorge Reis-Sá)
- Desfocados Pelo Vento. A Poesia dos Anos 80 Agora. Quasi Edições. V.N. Famalicão: 2004. (antologia poética – selecção e organização)
- Apeadeiro, Revista de Atitudes Literárias – Nº4 / Nº5. Quasi Edições. V.N. Famalicão: 2004. (co-direcção, com Jorge Reis-Sá)
- Afectos e Outros Afectos. Quasi Edições. V.N. Famalicão: 2004. (poesia, com Jorge Reis-Sá e pinturas de Isabel Lhano)
- São Salvador do Mundo. Edições Gailivro (Leya). Amadora: 2008. (turismo, com ilustrações de Rui Effe)
- Contos Policiais. Porto Editora. Porto: 2008. (antologia policial, com organização de Pedro Sena-Lino – conto)
- Rodrigues, José Cunha. À Luz da Kabbalah. Guerra & Paz. Lisboa: 2008. (prefácio)

== Music ==
- Disco de Cabeceira, Paulo Praça, Som Livre, Oeiras, 2007 (letrista);
- A Geração da Matilha, Mundo Cão, Cobra, Braga, 2009 (letrista);
- Propaganda Sentimental, Governo, Optimus, Lisboa, 2009 (letrista e cantor).

== Prizes ==
- Almeida Garrett Prize, 1999;
- José Saramago Prize, Fundação Círculo de Leitores, Lisboa, 2007.
- Grande Prémio Portugal Telecom de Literatura Melhor Livro do Ano, São Paulo, 2012.
- Grande Prémio Portugal Telecom de Literatura Melhor Romance do Ano, São Paulo, 2012.
