= Isabel Lhano =

Portuguese activist and visual artist

- Born: 1953; Vila do Conde
- Died: December 10, 2023 (aged 69–70); Vila do Conde
- Education: Faculty of Fine Arts, University of Porto
- Known for: Visual artist

Isabel Lhano (1953 - December 10, 2023) was a Portuguese artist. She fought against the Estado Novo and was arrested by PIDE for distributing leaflets against the Portuguese Colonial War. She was one of the founders of women's organization UMAR.

== Biography ==
Isabel Martins Lhano was born in Vila do Conde and is the daughter of artist Martins Lhano and sister of fellow artists Bárbara Martins and Graça Martins. At the age of 3, she moved to the city of Porto, where she began painting murals and where she completed her secondary education at the Soares dos Reis Art School. In 1971, she took a degree in painting at the Faculty of Fine Arts of the University of Porto, and was awarded a scholarship by the Calouste Gulbenkian Foundation that year and in 1972.

Lhano was a visual education teacher and illustrator at the Asa publishing house, having also created interior panels, posters, scenographies and urban murals. She was responsible for the programming and artistic direction of the Vila do Conde Municipal Auditorium Gallery (1992) and was part of the artistic direction team at the Delaunay Gallery (1996–1999).

Lhano was an anti-fascist resistance fighter and was a member of the Student Movement for Resistance to Fascism. She was arrested by the PIDE for distributing pamphlets against the colonial war and failed a college exam for presenting a painting about "a massacre by Portuguese soldiers in a village in Mozambique". Later, she became a militant of the UDP and the GDUP, and it was in this context that she took part in Otelo Saraiva de Carvalho's presidential campaign. She also supported the Left Bloc at various times and in various political campaigns.

Lhano was also a social and feminist activist, having been part of the Vila do Conde South Zone Residents' Commission, one of the founders of the UMAR association in 1976, and one of the organizers of the first MayDay, a demonstration against job insecurity in the city of Porto.

On December 10, 2023, in Vila do Conde, Lhano died of an aneurysm.

== Work ==
As an artist, Lhano was influenced by the work of Robert and Sonia Delaunay and used realistic, figurative and monochrome techniques, with a strong presence of the figure of women and themes related to violence, war and the defense of democracy.

=== Exhibitions ===
Lhano is represented in various museums and cultural venues both nationally and internationally, such as the Amadeo de Souza-Cardoso Museum, the Cerveira Museum of Contemporary Art, the northern delegation of the Ministry of Culture and the Engenheiro António Almeida Foundation, and has also presented her work in various exhibitions both in Portugal and abroad, such as:

- 2023 - Anthological exhibition Império da Beleza;
- 2022 - Corpo Plural;
- 2004 - Elogio Essencial;
- 1985 - Inquietações, The artist's first exhibition at the Eugénio de Almeida Foundation.

=== Murals ===
Sources:

- Tribute to Sónia Delaunay - Vila do Conde;
- Seca do Bacalhau - mural dedicated to the workers of the old codfish drying factory in Vila do Conde.

=== Covers ===
She has designed the covers of books by authors such as Valter Hugo Mãe (O Nosso Reino book), Rita Ferro Rodrigues and Daniel Maia Pinto, as well as album covers by the band Mão Morta.

In 2004, she published the book Afectos e Outros Afectos, co-authored with Valter Hugo Mãe and Jorge Reis-Sá.

== Recognition and honors ==
In 1999 she won 1st Prize in the Sarrió Graphic Competition, with the catalog Acto do Corpo, at the National Society of Fine Arts.

In 2023, the municipalities of Póvoa de Varzim and Vila do Conde jointly organized a tribute to Lhano on the occasion of her 50-year career in the visual arts and 40 years of exhibiting her work. The tribute included exhibitions and an anthology book entitled Isabel Lhano.

On December 11, 2023, the Porto Municipal Assembly unanimously approved a vote of condolence for her death.
