= Régis Bonvicino =

Brazilian writer and poet (1955–2025)

- Born: 25 February 1955; São Paulo, Brazil
- Died: 5 July 2025 (aged 70); Rome, Lazio, Italy
- Occupations: Poet, translator, literary critic, and editor
- Website: http://www.regisbonvicino.com.br/

Régis Rodrigues Bonvicino (25 February 1955 – 5 July 2025) was a Brazilian judge, appellate judge, poet, translator, literary critic and editor. The Historical Dictionary of Latin American Literature and Theater, edited by Richard Young and Odile Cisneros, defines him as a "restless innovator." And some Brazilian critics considered him one of the most consistent authors of the current scene – one of the few who has become a Brazilian reference in the world.

== Life and work ==
Bonvicino graduated from the Faculty of Law of the University of São Paulo in 1978. As a poet, he published two short books in the 1970s, while still very young, in an author's edition: Bicho Papel (1975) and Régis Hotel (1978). From the 1980s onwards, he released Copy Double (Max Limonad, 1983), Más Companhias (Olavobrás, 1987), 33 Poems (Illuminations, 1990), Other Poems (Illuminations, 1993), Primeiro Tempo (Perspectiva, 1995, collection of books Bicho Papel, Régis Hotel and Copy Look-Alike), Butterfly Bones (Editora 34, 1996), Together – a poem, voices (Ateliê Editorial, 1996), Céu-Eclipse (Editora 34, 1999), Remorse of Cosmos (of having come to the sun) (Ateliê Editoriall, 2003), Orphan Page (Martins Fontes, 2007) and Critical State (Editora Hedra, 2013). And a collection, in 2010, of his production: Until Now, by Régis Bonvicino (Editora Imprensa Oficial, 564 pages).

Abroad he also published Sky-Eclipse, Selected Poems (Los Angeles, Green Integer, 2000), Lindero Nuevo Vedado (Porto, Edições Quasi, 2002), Hilo de Piedra, a pamphlet published by Sibila, Revista de Arte, Música y Literatura, n. 10 (Seville, Oct. 2002, with poems from Sky-Eclipse and from Remorse of the Cosmos), Poemas, 1999-2003 (Mexico City, Alforja Conaculta-Fonca, 2006) and, in China, Blue Tile (Hong Kong, The Chinese University of Press, 2011), translated by the poet Yao Feng. "Beyond the Wall: New Selected Poems" was just released in 2017 by Green Integer, in Los Angeles. "Beyond the Wall" is her second solo book published in the United States.

In 2007, she published the book Entre/Between by Global Books, Paris, by French author Gervais Jassaud, with the participation of several international visual artists, including Hamra Abbas from Pakistan, Tatjana Doll from Germany, and Susan Bee from the United States. Global Books is the brainchild of graphic artist Gervais Jassaud and has published poets such as Michel Deguy, Michel Butor (France), Jerome Rothenberg, Charles Bernstein (United States), Nanni Balestrini (Italy), Yao Feng (China), and Nicole Brossard (Canada), among others.

Régis Bonvicino was editor, alongside Nelson Ascher and Michael Palmer, of one of the main anthologies of Brazilian poetry in recent decades: Nothing the Sun Could Not Explain (Los Angeles, Sun & Moon Press, 1997), through which he had Brazilian poets, such as Torquato Neto and Paulo Leminski, translated – for the first time – by important North American poets such as Robert Creeley and Michael Palmer. Nothing the Sun Could Not Explain has sold out two consecutive printings.

Critics in Brazil have written about his work as a poet, including Alcir Pécora, Haroldo de Campos, Boris Schnaiderman, João Adolfo Hansen, Silviano Santiago, Marjorie Perloff, Julio Castañon Guimarães, among many others.

Bonvicino edited the letters Paulo Leminski sent him in the 1970s, a book with different titles each time, the last of which, published by Editora 34 in 1999, was "Envie meu Dicionário (Cartas e Alguma Crítica)" (Send My Dictionary (Letters and Some Criticism), which kept the poet from Curitiba afloat when little was being said about him. The first edition of the volume, in 1991, had a foreword by Caetano Veloso.

As an editor, he published magazines such as Poesia em Greve, Muda, and Qorpo Estranho in the 1970s, the latter with Julio Plaza – in which he published Paulo Leminski, Waly Salomão, José Paulo Paes, Haroldo de Campos, and Décio Pignatari, among others. He is the creator of the magazine Sibila, which had eleven printed issues from 2001 to 2007 and has since become exclusively electronic, with approximately 300,000 visits per year:

As a translator, he has studied the Argentinian Oliverio Girondo, the French Jules Laforgue, the Americans Robert Creeley and Charles Bernstein, among many others.

As a critic, he has written for Folha de S. Paulo, O Estado de S. Paulo, the magazines Veja and Istoé, and the now-defunct Jornal do Brasil.

Among his international poetry readings, highlights include performances in Coimbra, Santiago de Compostela, Buenos Aires, Paris, Marseille, Chicago, San Francisco, Los Angeles, Hong Kong, Philadelphia, New York, and Santiago, Chile.

About his most recent book, Critical State, Alcir Pécora wrote: "Since Orphan Page, radicalized in this Critical State, I have not seen poetry that makes a more implacable critique of poetry and, at the same time, better reaffirms itself as poetry, than that of Régis Bonvicino. And this is so not because these books talk about poetry or theorize about the crisis of poetry, but because they move tactically around their impasses, implanting themselves in a terrain in which the verses occupy the most hostile streets of the metropolis".

Bonvicino died after suffering a fall in Rome, Italy, on 5 July 2025, at the age of 70. At the time of his death he was on vacation.

== Works ==
=== Poetry ===
- Paper Animal. São Paulo, Greve Editions, 1975.
- Régis Hotel. São Paulo, Groove Editions, 1978.
- Double of the Copy. São Paulo, Max Limonad, 1983.
- Bad Company. São Paulo, Olavobrás, 1987.
- 33 Poems. São Paulo, Illuminations, 1990.
- Other Poems. São Paulo, Illuminations, 1993.
- Butterfly Bones. São Paulo, Editora 34, 1996.
- Eclipse Sky. São Paulo, Editora 34, 1999.
- Remorse of the Cosmos (for having come to the sun). São Paulo, Editorial Studio, 2003.
- Orphan Page. São Paulo, Martins Editora, 2007.
- Critical State, São Paulo, Hedra, 2013

=== Booklets ===
- I Transform or the Son of Semele. Curitiba, Tigre do Espelho, 1999.
- Hilo de Piedra. Booklet published by Sibila magazine; art, music, and literature magazine, No. 10. Seville, October 2002 (with poems from Céu-eclipse and Remorso do Cosmos).

=== Anthologies ===
- Primeiro Tempo. São Paulo, Perspectiva, 1995 (collection of the books Bicho Papel, Régis Hotel, and Sósia da Cópia).
- Sky-Eclipse selected poems. Los Angeles, Green Integer, 2000.
- Lindero Nuevo Vedado. Porto, Edições Quasi, 2002 (with poems from 33 Poems, Other Poems, Butterfly Bones, and Eclipse Sky).
- Poems (1999-2003), Mexico City, Alforja Conaculta-Fonca, 2006.

=== Collective poems ===
- Together – a poem, voices. São Paulo, Ateliê Editorial, 1996.

=== Children's poetry ===
- In a Zoo of Letters. São Paulo, Maltese, 1994.

=== Criticism ===
- Desbragada (anthology and study of the poetry of Edgard Braga). São Paulo, Max Limonad, 1985.
- Nothing the sun could not explain / 20 contemporary Brazilian poets. Edited by Michael Palmer, Régis Bonvicino, and Nelson Ascher. Los Angeles, Sun & Moon Press, 1997.
- The PIP Anthology of World Poetry, volume 3, Nothing the sun could not explain; 20 Contemporary Brazilian Poets. Edited by Régis Bonvicino, Michael Palmer, and Nelson Ascher. Los Angeles, Green Integer, 2003.
- Send my dictionary (letters and some criticism), with Paulo Leminski. São Paulo, Editora 34, 1999.

=== Translation ===
- LAFORGUE, Jules. "Litanias da Lua." São Paulo, Iluminuras, 1989.
- GIRONDO, Oliverio. "A Pupila do Zero." São Paulo, Iluminuras, 1995.
- PALMER, Michael. "Passagens." Ouro Preto, Gráfica Ouro Preto, 1996.
- CREELEY, Robert. "To One." São Paulo. Ateliê Editorial, 1997.
- BERNSTEIN, C., MESSERLI, D., COLE, N. and BENNETT, G. "Duets". Paranavaí. UEPG Publishing House, 1997.
- MESSERLI, Douglas. "First Words". São Paulo, Ateliê Editorial, 1999.
- "A Boat Patches the Sea/Ten Contemporary Chinese Poets", with Yao Feng, São Paulo, Martins Editora, 2007.
- BERNSTEIN, Charles. "War Stories", São Paulo, Martins Editora, 2008.

=== Partnership ===
- Cadenciando-um-ning, one samba for the other. São Paulo, Ateliê Editorial, 2001 (with Michael Palmer).

=== Visual arts ===
- From Grapefruit. São Paulo, Artists' Edition, 1981. (translations of instructional poems by Yoko Ono, with graphic works by Regina Silveira).
