= Rafael Gallo =

Brazilian writer

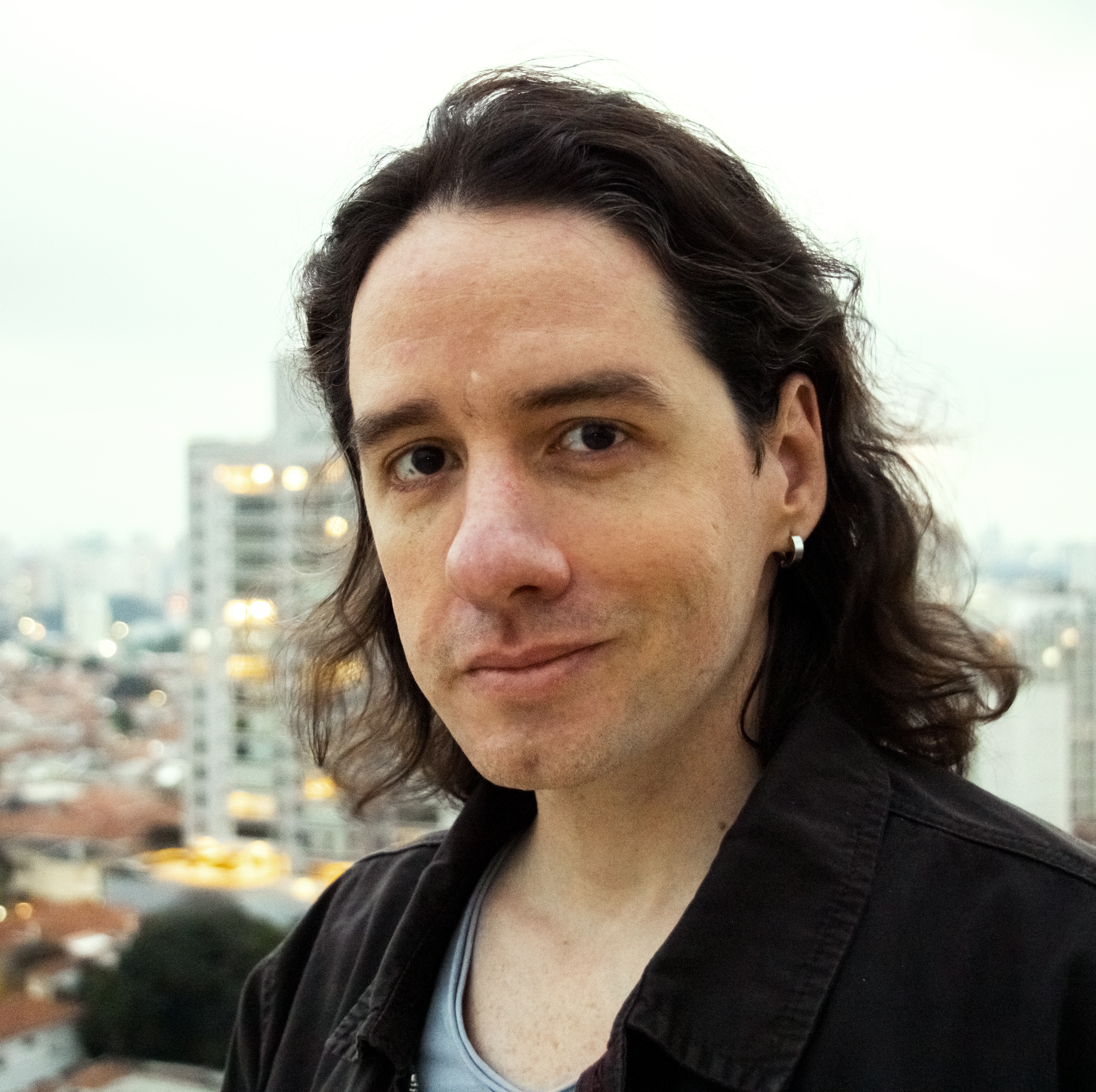
Image of Rafael Gallo

Rafael Gallo is a Brazilian writer. He was born in São Paulo in 1981.

He is best known for his novels Rebentar, which won the 2016 São Paulo Prize for Literature, and Dor Fantasma, which won the 2022 José Saramago Prize. His other titles include Réveillon e outros dias and Cavalos no escuro. His work has also been nominated for the Prêmio Jabuti.
