= José Saramago Prize =

José Saramago Literary Prize
- Native name: Prémio Literário José Saramago
- Description: Best literary work in Portuguese by a young author
- Country: Portugal
- Presented by: Círculo de Leitores Foundation
- Reward: €25,000
- Website: www.circuloleitores.pt

The José Saramago Literary Prize has been awarded since 1999 by the Círculo de Leitores Foundation to a literary work written in Portuguese by a young author in which the first edition was published in a Lusophone country. It celebrates the attribution of the Nobel Prize in Literature in 1998 to the Portuguese writer José Saramago. The prize has a biannual periodicity, and a monetary value of €25,000. The jury is composed of between five and ten members holding distinguished cultural roles.

== Laureates ==
Year	Author	Work	Country
1999	Paulo José Miranda	Natureza Morta	Portugal
2001	José Luís Peixoto	Nenhum Olhar	Portugal
2003	Adriana Lisboa	Sinfonia em Branco	Brazil
2005	Gonçalo M. Tavares	Jerusalém	Portugal
2007	Valter hugo mãe	o remorso de baltazar serapião	Portugal
2009	João Tordo	As Três Vidas	Portugal
2011	Andréa del Fuego	Os Malaquias	Brazil
2013	Ondjaki	Os Transparentes	Angola
2015	Bruno Vieira Amaral	As Primeiras Coisas	Portugal
2017	Julián Fuks	A Resistência	Brazil
2019	Afonso Reis Cabral	Pão de Açúcar	Portugal
2022	Rafael Gallo	Dor Fantasma	Brazil
2024	Francisco Mota Saraiva	Morramos ao menos no porto	Portugal
