= Transparent City =

2012 romance novel by Angolan author Ondjaki

- Title page for Os Transparentes (Original Portuguese language edition, 2012)
- Author: Ondjaki
- Language: Portuguese
- Genre: Magical Realism
- Publisher: Caminho
- Publication date: 2012
- Publication place: Angola
- Media type: Print (paperback)
- Pages: 431
- ISBN: 978-972-21-2595-6

Transparent City (Portuguese: Os Transparentes) is a novel by Angolan writer Ondjaki published in 2012 by Caminho. It won the José Saramago Literary Prize in 2013. The book was translated into English in 2018 by Stephen Henighan under Biblioasis Publishing.

It is written as a series of vignettes into the life of the many people who inhabit the Maianga building (a residential building in the Maiainga district of Luanda) in which the protagonist lives, providing perspectives from across age and experience as to the current state of a degraded and modern Luanda. A common thread tying many of these stories together is that the characters are doing what they can to survive in a broken city. This is shown throughout novel but specifically in this moment:

Luanda was boiling with people who sold, who bought to sell, who sold themselves to later go out and buy, and people who sold themselves without being able to buy anything.

The aftermath of the Angolan Civil War is present throughout the entirety of the work, as Odonato bemoans the fallen state of Luanda after the war that overthrew the prior socialist government. This cultural trauma is shown throughout the book's writing:

«The war», it was said, «is a bleeding memory, and at any moment you open your mouth, or gesticulate, and what comes out is an incarnate trace of things you didn't know you knew» all Angolans had, therefore, some paranoia with weapons or armaments, all had a story to tell or an episode to invent

Breaking up the narrative sections, there are single black pages with white text, including lines from author's notes, various character's recordings, and even "the voice of the people."

== Plot ==
In Luanda, Angola, a flooded apartment building is home to many vibrant families. The story is centered around Odonato who lives on the sixth floor of the Maianga Building with his wife, Xilisbaba, their daughter, Amarelinha, and Granma Kunjikise. While searching for his lost son, Odonato's flesh becomes transparent as Luanda becomes unrecognizable. When his son, Ciente-the-Grand, stumbles into the Maianga Building late at night, bloodied from trying to rob someone's house, Little Daddy mistakes him for a thief. Little Daddy warns the other residents by whistling twice. Nga Nelucha hears the whistle on the fourth floor and wakes her husband, Edú. Edú takes a broom and bangs the ceiling to wake Comrade Mute, while Odonato's family wakes up at the same time. When everyone descends to see who it is, they learn that Ciente-the-Grand was shot up the buttocks. Ciente-the-Grand can not go to the hospital for fear that he will be arrested for attempted robbery. Unable to receive proper care, Ciente leaves the apartment and collapses outside of the building. A group of six policemen believe that Ciente is a "pot-head" and attempt to kick him awake, then take him into their police car.

While searching for his son, Odonato runs into Superintendent Gadinho who helps to locate his son. He discovers that the policemen took him down to a police station with a strict commanding officer. Odonato is told that the commanding officer wants food in exchange for his son, but every time Odonato delivers food to the police station, the policemen eat it. He goes to the station one last time, but he discovers that Ciente was consigned to the fourteenth district cemetery three days ago.

Ononato and Little Daddy find Ciente's body at the cemetery and carry him back to the apartment building. The closer they get to the apartment, the heavier Ciente's body becomes. The residents have to help carry Ciente to Odonato's apartment on the sixth floor. When they place him on a table, the body breaks the table and falls through the floors below to the main entrance.

The residents attend Ciente's funeral at the Church of the Sacred Little Lamb founded by one of the residents. Odonato has become so light that he needs to be tethered to a chair. After the funeral, Odonato asks to be tied to his favorite spot on the roof of the apartment building. At the end of the novel, Luanda is engulfed in flames and Odonato floats to the sky.

In addition to Odonato, the story follows the private lives of many of the residents of the Maianga building. On the third floor is Little Daddy who came to Luanda searching for his lost mother. By the end of the novel, his search is publicized and his mother is found, but Little Daddy is dead from an altercation in the streets. Senhor Eduardo, Edú, and Nga Nelucha live on the fourth floor. Edú is often visited by international specialists who are fascinated by the large hernia on his left testicle. Meanwhile, Comrade Mute on the fifth floor is an excellent barbecue cook who loves playing music from his apartment.

Other characters include João Slowly who founds the Church of the Sacred Little Lamb next to his favorite bar. He also creates the Rooster Camões Cinema at the top of the apartment building. Additionally, Blind Man and Seashell Seller sell seashells to wealthy residents and residents in the apartment building. They appear in the beginning and the end of the novel with Blind Man inquiring Seashell Seller about the color of fire. Seashell Seller and Amarelinha fall in love, and it is suggested that Amarelinha is pregnant. Lastly, the Mailman handwrites countless letters to anyone in power asking for transportation to help him deliver the mail. At the end of the novel, he reads an official letter that denies the concession of a vehicle.

In Luanda, excavations are being carried out in search of oil, which not only takes peace of mind from the city dwellers, but will severely damage the city as a whole. The excavations culminate in the entirety of Luanda burning as an errant spark turns the oil buried underneath the city into a firestorm. Odonato, having become nearly entirely transparent by the end of the novel, floats above the flames, away from the fire engulfing his former home. In this final scene, the magical realist symbolism is very important. Despite the many warnings of the dangers of the oil drilling project, capitalist politicians and powerful businesses hungry for money and nothing else pushed through with the oil drilling, causing Luanda to become an inferno. As a result, this novel uses magical realist elements as a critique of colonialism, capitalism, and the corrosive and harmful aspects of corrupt politicians.

== Characters ==
- Odonato – the protagonist, a disillusioned man who slowly turns transparent as his quest to recover his son Ciente from Luanda becomes more and more fruitless and intense feelings of nostalgia for the old Luanda overtake his soul;
- Xilisbaba – Odonato's wife;
- Amarelinha – the daughter of Odonato and Xilisbaba;
- Grandma Kunjikise – Odonato's grandmother, the eldest of the family;
- Ciente-the-Grand – son of Odonato and Xilisbaba, a delinquent;
- Edú – An inhabitant of the Maianga building, has a massive hernia;
- Little Daddy – an orphan worker, who lives separate from his mother;
- João Slowly – organizes a cinema on the building's terrace;
- The Leftist – a bohemian who frequents the Noah's Barque bar;
- Strong Maria – The wife of João Slowly
- The Journalist – an English woman who visits the building and interviews some residents;
- Davide Airosa – an oil specialist who warns of the dangers of oil excavations;
- Raago – a North American specialist brought to Angola to assess the oil project;
- The Minister – a politician who represents the interests of the government;
- Ribeiro Secco – also known as Dom Crystal-Clear, an entrepreneur who represents private interests to privatize Luanda's water transport system;
- Paulo Paused – a journalist;
- Clara – the wife of Paulo Paused;
- Scratch Man – or Colonel Hoffmann, a man who takes advantage of his rank to move between social classes;
- Mailman – seeks to get a moped to assist him in his work as a mailman by writing letters to people in power and giving them out to those he thinks can help his cause;
- This Time and Next Time – twin brothers in service of the Luandan government, who barge in on the building's residents to try and get bribes from their money-making activities;
- Rooster Camões – a one-eyed rooster;
- Blind Man – an old man, and Seashell Seller's philosophical traveling companion;
- Seashell Seller – a seller of seashells, which he procures from Luanda's seashore;
- The Real Zé – a lucky criminal who brought Ciente into a life of crime;
- Comrade Mute – a war veteran who lives in the Maianga Building;
