= Galveias =

- Civil parish
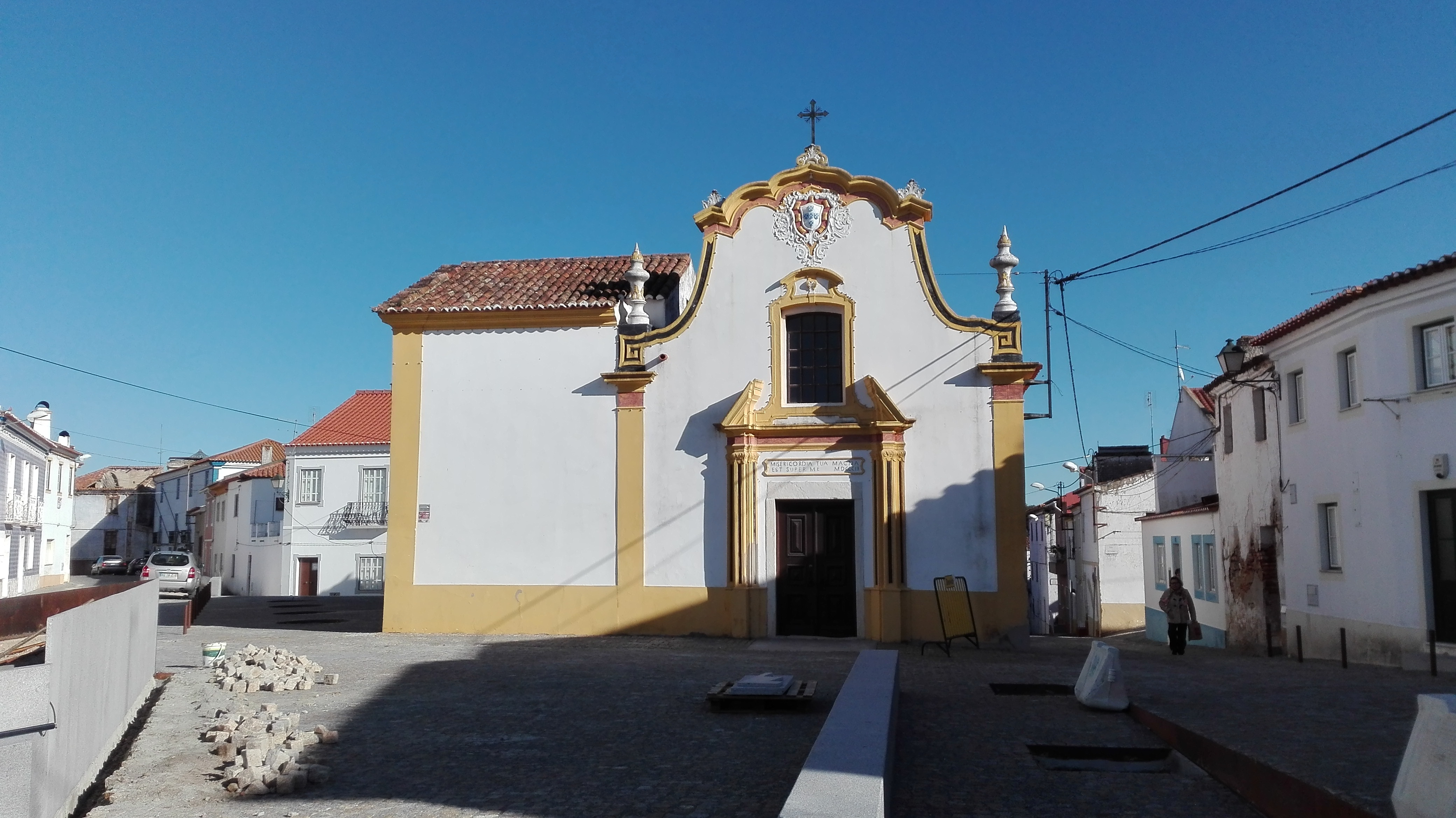

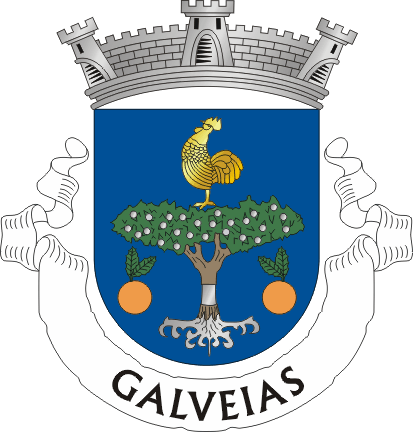
- Coat of arms

- Location in Portugal
- Coordinates: 39.160°N 7.998°W
- Country: Portugal
- Region: Alentejo
- Intermunic. comm.: Alto Alentejo
- District: Portalegre
- Municipality: Ponte de Sor

Area
  - Total: 79.83 km^{2} (30.82 sq mi)
- Elevation: 224 m (735 ft)

Population (2011)
  - Total: 1,061
  - Density: 13.29/km^{2} (34.42/sq mi)
- Time zone: UTC+00:00 (WET)
  - Summer (DST): UTC+01:00 (WEST)
- Postal code: 7400
- Area code: 242
- Patron: São Lourenço
- Website: http://jfgalveias.pt/

Galveias is a civil parish in the municipality of Ponte de Sor, in the Portuguese northern Alentejo, district of Portalegre. The population in 2011 was 1,061, in an area of 79.83 km^{2}. The small parish developed under the patronage of Order of Aviz, endowments from the Marquês Ratão family.

== History ==
The founding of this settlement is attributed to friar Lourenço Afonso, a master in the Order of Aviz, in 1342. Galveias was a priory in the Order of Avis, and benefited from the Order's wealth, and religious patronage. But, economically, the region was already a prosperous agricultural centre, supported by the cultivation of oranges and raising of local poultry (both emblematic of its coat-of-arms). It was originally known as Vila Nova do Laranjal because of its many orange groves. In addition, olive oil and wine (currently marketed under the Marques Ratão brand) were produced and commercialized by its citizens.

Jorge de Alencastre, son of King John II, first expanded the settlement in 1425.

On 1 January 1512, the settlers benefited from a foral (charter) issued by the Aviz, and granted by King Manuel I. By 1538, King John III elevated the settlement to the status of town.

Important to the regions growth were the Counts of Galveias: the first titular, Dinis de Melo e Castro, was installed in 1691 (there were 10 titular until it was ultimately extinguished in 1940).

== Geography ==
Galveias is situated in the municipality of Ponte de Sor: it is located 14 kilometres from the municipal seat, and 18 kilometres from the town of Avís, crossed by the E.N.244 motorway.

The local population is concentrated in the main town (Galveias), in which the homes are older dwellings, apart from two modern residential developments. Comprising 1800 residents, it is composed of primarily seniors (having the highest percentage of older adults), in addition to an elevated number of immigrants (primarily from the United Kingdom).

Galveias has its own administrative council (Portuguese: Assembleia da Freguesia) and executive (Portuguese: Junta de Freguesia), post of the G.N.R, post office and one banking institution. In addition to the kindergarten (Escola EB/J D. Anita), which receives 3 to 4 year olds until primary, it also has its own primary school (Escola de Galveias) consisting of pre-primary, primary and pre-secondary students, consisting of six classrooms.

A seniors residence provides lodging, assistance and hygiene for 70 seniors, supported by a small health centre (Portuguese: Centro de Saúde) providing administration, consultancy and curative care and a small hospital with limited assistance and palliative care.

== Economy ==
The region supports a micro-climate, adequate to support the orange groves, vineyards and olive orchards that dominate the agricultural industry. Portion of the parish is allocated to two hunting reserves for tourists and local huntsmen.

Many of its citizens are involved in seasonal (agricultural) employment, work outside the parish (mainly in Ponte de Sor and Avis) or are employed under the Programas Ocupacionais do Centro de Emprego. The commercial activities are limited, but include cafés and various smaller concessionaires.

== Architecture ==
=== Civic ===
- Building of Correios, Telégrafos e Telefones (CTT) de Galveias
- Building Largo da Misericórdia
- Fountain of Galveias (Portuguese: Chafariz de Galveias)
- Estate of the Bragas (Portuguese: Solar dos Bragas)
- Fountain of the Villa (Portuguese: Fonta da Villa)
- Galveias Health Care Centre (Portuguese: Posto Hospitalar Dr. Mário Godinho de Campos/Centro de Saúde de Galveias)
- Galveias Kindergarten/D. Anita Kindergarten (Portuguese: Infantário da Junta de Freguesia de Galveias/Infantário Dona Anita)
- Galveias Primary School (Portuguese: Escola Primária de Galveias)
- Parish Building (Portuguese: Junta Freguesia de Galveias)
- Residence EN224
- Residence Rua da Misericórdia, Nº48
- Residence Rua da Misericórdia, Nº55
- Residence Rua da Misericórdia, Nº78
- Residence Rua Joaquim Barradas de Carvalho, Nº61
- Residence Rua M.M. Godinho de Campos
- Ribeira das Vinhas Primary School (Portuguese: Escola Primária de Ribeira das Vinhas)

=== Religious ===
- Chapel of the Santa Casa da Misericórdia (Portuguese: Capela da Santa Casa da Misericórdia de Galveias), or Funerary Chapel of Galveias (Portuguese: Capela Funerária de Galveias)
- Chapel of Santo António (Portuguese: Capela de Santo António)
- Chapel of São João (Portuguese: Capela de São João)
- Chapel of São Pedro (Portuguese: Capela de São Pedro)
- Chapel of São Saturnino (Portuguese: Capela de São Satunrino)
- Chapel of São Sebastião (Portuguese: Capela de São Sebastião)
- Chapel of Senhor das Almas (Portuguese: Capela do Senhora das Almas)
- Church of São Lourençao (Portuguese: Igreja Matriz de Galveias/Igreja de São Lourenço)

== Culture ==
The local cultural institutions include a public library (located in the old Casa do Povo), the Casa da Cultura (Culture House), which also serves as a library, computer centre, music room, video centre, in addition to the presentation of socio-cultural events. There are also two halls to provide post-school services and extra-circular activities.

The Sociedade Filarmónica is the historically popular local band, that provides concerts and play at most local events, as well as providing music classes for the region.
