= Maria Ondina Braga =

Portuguese writer and translator (1922–2003)

- Born: 13 January 1922; Braga, Portugal
- Died: 14 March 2003 (aged 81); Braga
- Education: Royal Society of Arts
- Occupations: Writer and translator
- Years active: 50
- Known for: Novels set in Asia

Maria Ondina Braga (1922–2003), was a Portuguese writer and translator, particularly known for her novels and short stories that are set mainly in Asia.

== Early life ==
Braga was born on 13 January 1922 in the centre of the city of Braga in the north of Portugal. She lived in a cultured family, which influenced her writing. Her uncle provided for her education, which included learning to speak French, and encouraged her taste for unknown lands. After completing her secondary education at the Liceu Sá de Miranda in Braga in 1938, she suffered a serious illness that led to depression, a negative body image and suicidal thoughts, which were revealed in her writing. In 1949 she self-published her first book of poems, to be followed by another three years later.

She left Braga in 1956 to improve her English language, working as an au pair in Worcester and taking a lengthy holiday in Scotland with her host family, before completing a course at the Royal Society of Arts in London. She then went to Paris to study French, while working as a children's tutor in Versailles, returning to Portugal in 1959.

== Beginnings of her travels ==
Showing considerable independence for a single woman in conservative Portugal, where, under the Estado Novo dictatorship, women were mainly seen as mothers and housewives, Braga left home in 1960 and went to Luanda, capital of Portuguese Angola, where she taught English and Portuguese. The following year she moved to Goa but soon had to leave when India annexed the Portuguese colony. She then moved to another Portuguese colony, Macau, in China, where she lectured at the private Catholic Santa Rosa de Lima college. While in Macau she took the opportunity to explore other parts of Asia, including Hong Kong, Vietnam, Singapore, Sri Lanka (then Ceylon), and Mumbai (then Bombay) in India. She also travelled by ship to Djibouti and Egypt.

== Writing and translation ==
Braga returned to Lisbon in 1964 and then devoted herself exclusively to writing and translation, translating works by, among others, Erskine Caldwell, Graham Greene, Bertrand Russell, Herbert Marcuse and Tzvetan Todorov into Portuguese. She also contributed travel articles to various newspapers and magazines, including Diário de Notícias, Diário Popular, A Capital, Panorama, Colóquio, published by the Calouste Gulbenkian Foundation, and Mulher.

Her first publication, Eu vim para ver a terra (I Came to See the Earth) in 1965 brought together her newspaper and magazine writing. This was followed by a book of short stories A China Fica ao Lado (China is next door - 1968), and her first novel Estátua de Sal (Salt Statue - 1969), which was based on her experience in Macau. In 1970 she published Amor e Morte (Love and Death), a collection of short stories that she later reworked and expanded as O Homem da Ilha e Outro Contos (The Island Man and other stories), which earned her, in 1982, the prestigious Prémio Ricardo Malheiros, an award given by the Lisbon Academy of Sciences for works of fiction. Reviewers have noted that her work is marked by solitariness, loneliness, and sadness. Some attribute this to her upbringing in Braga where she was surrounded by Catholic aunts.

In 1982, she held the position of Reader of Portuguese at the Institute of Foreign Languages in Beijing. This inspired her to write Angústia em Peking (Anguish in Beijing - 1984). She returned to Macau in 1991, the year in which she published Nocturno em Macau, which was awarded the Prémio Literário Fundação Eça de Queiroz. A subsequent book, Passagem do Cabo (Cape Passage) was about her travels.

== Critical appraisal ==
Studying and working in England and France and teaching English and Portuguese in Angola, Goa, Macau, and Beijing had a strong effect on Braga's work, which was markedly autobiographical. Several of her works are novelized autobiographies. She is considered to stand out in Portuguese literature as being one of the few Portuguese writers who had a cosmopolitan outlook and had the ability to transform her life and experiences into great literature. Her books have been translated into several languages, including Spanish, French, Polish, Hungarian, German, and Italian but, despite this relative success, interviews she gave to the press showed that she did not feel valued on the Portuguese literary scene.

== Death ==
Braga's last book was Vidas Vencidas (Lives Lost), which was published in 1998 and won the Grande Prémio de Literatura, ITF. After having lived most of her later life in Lisbon, she returned to Braga, where she died on 14 March 2003.

The Nogueira da Silva Museum at the University of Minho holds Braga's intellectual estate. The collection includes manuscripts, books, newspaper clippings, photographs, and correspondence, and is on display. A street in Braga bears her name and there is a bust of her in the city's Praça da República. In 2022, the publisher, Imprensa Nacional, began publishing her complete works.

In 2018 the Portuguese Writers' Association and the Braga City Council introduced a prize for travel literature in her name.
