= Yan Ai-Lin =

Taiwanese poet

Yan Ai-Lin (born 1968) is a Taiwanese poet. She was the first female poet to create a series of erotic poems, which aroused many discussions in the aspect of the gender issue. She is known primarily as an author of mainly new poetry, prose creation, and cartoon criticism. Her most representative book Bones, Skin and Flesh (骨皮肉, 1997) is the first collection of erotic poems written by female poet in Taiwan. Yan's literary production won many awards, including the National Outstanding Young Poet Award, the Outstanding Award for New Poem Creation from the Ministry of Culture, the Genesis Poetry Magazine 35th Anniversary Poet Award, the first Taipei Literature Award, the Wu Zhuoliu New Poetry, and so on. Yan's poetry was influenced by different aspects, and her works also influenced people, society, and the academic field.

== Early life ==
Yan Ai-Lin was born in Tainan City, Taiwan, in 1968. She majored in history at Fu Jen Catholic University. At the age of thirteen, she published her first poetry and prose. At the age of sixteen, she has already published her poems in the literary section in Taiwan. When she was young, she also played rock music, acted in the theater, joined Xinhuo Poetry Magazine (薪火詩刊社), and put out some underground publications which were not published to the public officially.

== Works ==
Yan's works include poems, proses, critics and traditional Chinese edition. Most of her poems are the combination of love poems and erotic poems. Yan was known for speaking out for women by making full use of women's body image. She thought women should have the autonomy of their bodies, inner feelings, and lust instead of being the attachment of men.

In four of Yan's collections of poems, Abstract Map (抽象的地圖, 1994), Bones, Skin and Flesh (骨皮肉, 1997), The Names of Things (點萬物之名, 2001), Else Where (她方, 2004), she depicted a woman's growth in a continuous way. Her first book of poems Abstract Map (抽象的地圖) was published in 1994, depicting women's pure inner feelings with the content on the lust between men and women. Her second and most representative poetry book, Bones, Skin and Flesh(骨皮肉), was published in 1997, the first collection of erotic poems written by a female poet in Taiwan. In this book, she combined both women's bodies and lust as her writing inspirations with bold and vivid description. She especially emphasized sensory experience and feminine physiological experience in this book. In her third book of poems The Names of Things (點萬物之名, 2001), the theme is still about women's bodies and lust. Her fourth poetry book Else Where (她方) was published in 2004, illustrating the interactions of bodies and lusts in the intercourse in her poems and other themes about the life episodes of women such as pregnancy, childbirth and childraising. Like her previous works, she put continuous effort to eliminate gender stereotypes in Else Where. However, female consciousness is more prevasive than the other poetry books.

== Awards ==
Yan won the National Outstanding Young Poet Award from the New Poetry Society of the Republic of China in 1991. In 1992, she was awarded the Outstanding Award for New Poem Creation from the Ministry of Culture, Taiwan. In the same year, she was the recipient of the 35th Anniversary Poet Award at Genesis Poetry Magazine. Five years later, Yan received the 40th Anniversary Best Poem Award at Genesis Poetry Magazine（創世紀詩刊40週年詩人獎）. In 1999, Yan won the first Taipei Literature Award for her proses.

In 2001, Yan's collection of children's poems, Playing Games with the Sky, was the winner of the Good Books for Everyone to Read Local Creations recommendation award. In Playing Games with the Sky, Yan uses imagery to let children experience and understand life. In 2010, Yan's new poem The Man Called Xu Zhuoliu garnered the Wu Zhuoliu New Poetry Award as the first female writer's work. In 2011, Yan was awarded the New Poetry Medal in the Chinese Literature and Art Literature category issued by the Chinese Literature and Art Association. In 2012, Yan won the first Cross-Strait Poet Laureate Award on Hainan Island. In 2015, Yan won the "First Reader" Best Poet Award. The reason she got the award was that her poems are very exploratory and experimental and can correspond to the poet's psychological reality, looking from the back of things to the front, from the inside to the outside.

== Influence on her writing ==
Since her childhood, Yan has read Three Hundred Tang Poems as the core influence of her writing career and as a modern poet. As a teenager, Yan was obsessed with bands, and the Eastern and Western music culture, like Taiwan's heavy metal band—Assassin, and MTV, which enabled her to co-write a play, the Uncolour, in 2010. Because of an unpleasant childhood, Yan turned her feelings into poems and made her life complete by writing poetry. Yan acknowledged Zheng Chou-Yu，Bai-Qiu, Ya Xian, Chou Meng-tieh, and Luo Fu as literary influences, and she learned various things from each person.
