= Gonçalo M. Tavares =

Portuguese writer (born 1970)

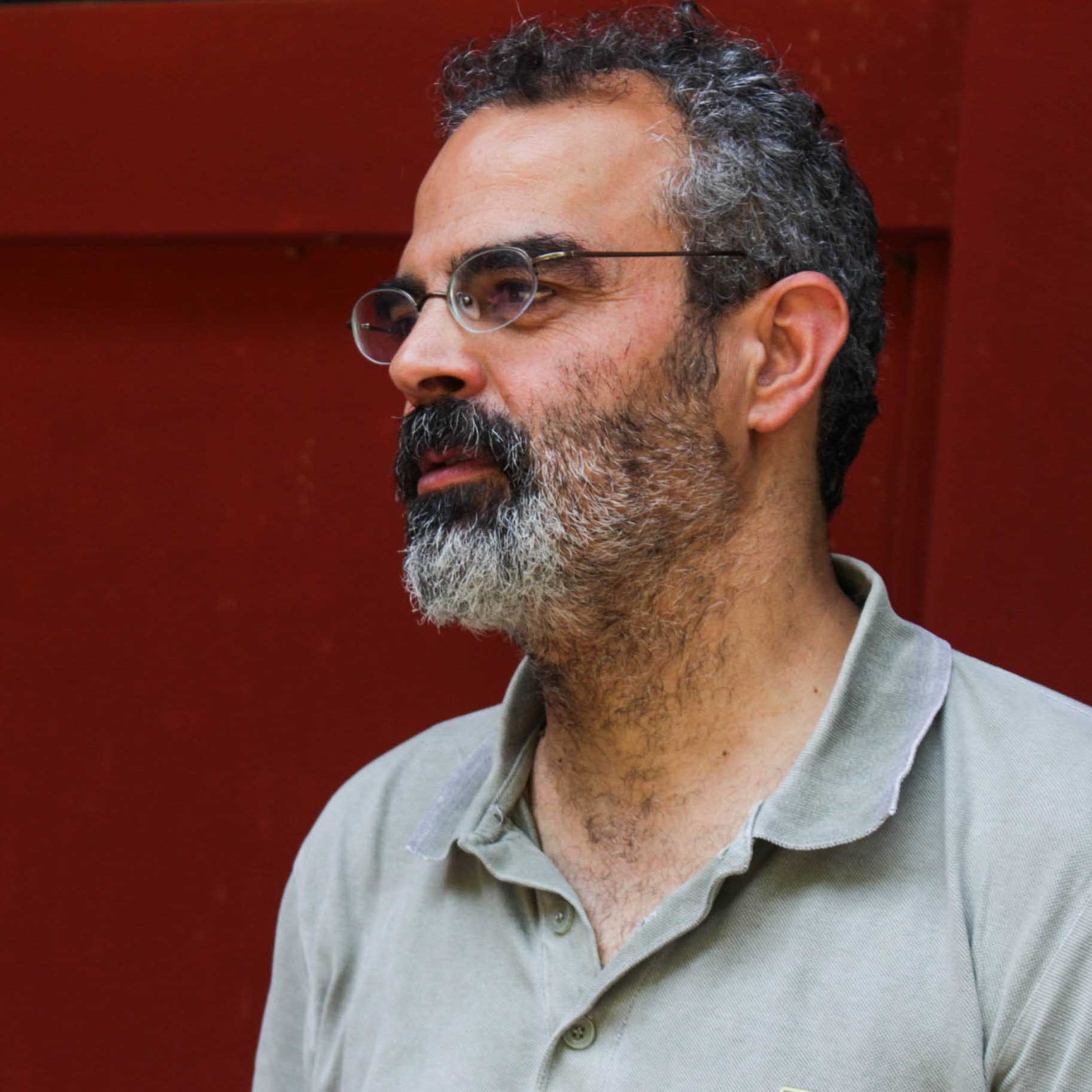
- Born: 1970 (age 55–56); Luanda, Angola
- Occupation: Writer

Gonçalo Manuel de Albuquerque Tavares (born August 1970) is a Portuguese writer and professor of Theory of Science in Lisbon. He published his first work in 2001 and since then has been awarded several prizes. His books have been published in more than 30 countries and the book Jerusalém has been included in the European edition of 1001 Books to Read Before You Die.

Nobel Laureate José Saramago stated: "In thirty years' time, if not before, Tavares will win the Nobel Prize, and I'm sure my prediction will come true... Tavares has no right to be writing so well at the age of 35. One feels like punching him." Tavares published a great variety of books since 2001 and has been awarded several national and international literary prizes. In 2005, he won the José Saramago Prize for young writers under 35. In his speech at the award ceremony, Saramago commented: "JERUSALÉM is a great book, and truly deserves a place among the great works of Western literature."

== Career ==
Tavares is the author of a large body of work that has been translated in countries such as India, Japan, Sweden, Denmark, China, Cuba, South Africa, Indonesia, Iceland, Turkey, Palestine, Iraq, Egypt, Moldova, Estonia, Israel, Venezuela and the United States, in a total of seventy countries.

Saramago predicted that he would win the Nobel Prize. Vasco Graça Moura wrote that A Journey to India will still be talked about in a hundred years' time. The New Yorker said that, like Kafka and Beckett, Tavares showed that "logic can effectively serve madness as well as reason".

Tavares' language breaks with Portuguese lyrical traditions and his subversion of literary genres is innovative. Recently, Tavares' Le Quartier (The Quarter) received the prestigious Prix Laure-Bataillon 2021, awarded to the best book translated in France, succeeding Nobel laureate Olga Tokarczuk, who received this prize in 2019, and Catalan writer Miquel de Palol. Twenty-two of Tavares' works have won awards in different countries. He has been a finalist for the Oceanos Prize six times and has been awarded the prize three times. He was also twice a finalist for the Prix Médicis and twice a finalist for the Prix Femina, among other distinctions such as the Prix du Meilleur Livre Étranger in 2010.

His books have been the basis for plays, art objects, art videos, and opera.

In 2025, he released "The End of the United States of America," an epic in his tradition of thinking about politics through fiction.

== Works ==
Year	English title	Original title	Literary universe/theme
2001	---	A Temperatura do Corpo	---
2001	---	Livro da Dança	---
2002	---	Investigações	---
2002	Mr Valéry and Logic	O Senhor Valéry e a Lógica	The Neighbourhood
2003	---	A Colher de Samuel Beckett e Outros Textos (teatro)	---
2003	Mr Henri and the Encyclopaedia	O Senhor Henri e a Enciclopédia	The Neighbourhood
2003	Klaus Klump: A Man	Um Homem: Klaus Klump	The Kingdom
2004	Joseph Walser's Machine	A Máquina de Joseph Walser	The Kingdom
2004	Jerusalém	Jerusalém	The Kingdom
2004	1	1	---
2004	---	Biblioteca	---
2004	---	A Perna Esquerda de Paris Seguido de Roland Barthes e Robert Musil	---
2004	Mr Brecht and Success	O Senhor Brecht e o Sucesso	The Neighbourhood
2004	Mr Juarroz and the Thought	O Senhor Juarroz e o Pensamento	The Neighbourhood
2005	Mr Kraus and Politics	O Senhor Kraus e a Política	The Neighbourhood
2005	Mr Calvin and the Promenade	O Senhor Calvino e o Passeio	The Neighbourhood
2005	---	Investigações Geométricas	---
2005	---	Histórias Falsas	---
2006	Brief Notes on Science	Breves Notas sobre Ciência	Encyclopaedia
2006	---	Água, Cão, Cavalo, Cabeça	---
2006	Mr Walser and the Forest	O Senhor Walser e a Floresta	The Neighbourhood
2007	Brief Notes on Fear	Breves Notas sobre o Medo	Encyclopaedia
2007	Learning to Pray in the Age of Technology	Aprender a Rezar na Era da Técnica	The Kingdom
2008	Mr Breton and the Interview	O Senhor Breton e a Entrevista	The Neighbourhood
2009	Mr Swedenborg and the Geometrical Investigations	O Senhor Swedenborg e as Investigações Geométricas	The Neighbourhood
2009	Brief Notes on Connections	Breves Notas sobre as Ligações	Encyclopaedia
2010	A Voyage to India	Uma Viagem à Índia	---
2010	Mr Eliot and the Conferences	O Senhor Eliot e as Conferências	The Neighbourhood
2010	Matteo Lost His Job	Matteo Perdeu o Emprego	---
2011	Short Movies	Short Movies	---
2011	---	Canções Mexicanas	---
2013	---	Animalescos	---
2013	Atlas of the Body and the Imagination	Atlas do Corpo e da Imaginação	---
2014	Old People Want to Live Too	Os Velhos Também Querem Viver	---
2014	A Girl is Lost in Her Century Looking for Her Father	Uma Menina está Perdida no seu Século à Procura do Pai	---
2015	Brief Notes on Music	Breves Notas sobre Música	Encyclopaedia
2015	His Excellency, The Circumlucologist	O Torcicologologista, Excelência	---
2017	The Woman-Without-a-Head and the Man-With-the-Evil-Eye	A Mulher-Sem-Cabeça e o Homem-do-Mau-Olhado	Mythologies
2018	Brief Notes on Bloom-Literature	Breves Notas sobre Literatura-Bloom	Encyclopaedia
2018	Five Children, Five Rats	Cinco Meninos, Cinco Ratos	Mythologies
2019	Bucarest-Budapest: Budapest-Bucarest	Bucareste-Budapeste: Budapeste-Bucareste	---
2019	In America, Said Jonathan	Na América, disse Jonathan	---
2020	The Middle Bone	O Osso do Meio	The Kingdom
2021	Plague Diary	Diário da Peste: O Ano de 2020	---
2021	Dictionary of Artists	Dicionário de Artistas	---
2022	The Stone and the Drawing	A Pedra e o Desenho	---
2022	The Devil	O Diabo	Mythologies

== Awards ==
- Prix Laure Bataillon (2021, France, for the French translation of The Neighbourhood)
- Bellas Artes - MARGARITA MICHELENA Award for Best Translation (2019, Mexico, for A Girl is Lost in Her Century Looking for Her Father)
- University of Lisbon Prize (2019, Portugal)
- Vergílio Ferreira Literary Award (2017, Portugal)
- Prix Littéraire Européen, Étudiants Francophones (2011, France, for Mister Kraus and Politics)
- Special Price of the Jury of the Grand Prix Littéraire du Web Cultura (2010, France)
- Prix du Meilleur Livre Étranger (2010, France); This award has been given to authors such as Salmon Rushdie, Elias Canetti, Robert Musil, Orhan Pamuk, John Updike, Philip Roth, Gabriel García Márquez and Colm Tóibín, among others.
- Belgrade Poetry Award (2009, Serbia)
- International Prize of Trieste (2008, Italy)
- Prêmio Portugal Telecom (2007, Brazil)
- José Saramago Prize, 2005
