= List of Angolans =

Notable people from Angola include:

== Athletes ==
- Akwá (born 1977), footballer, Parliament member (MPLA)
- Flávio Amado (born 1979), footballer
- Didi, footballer
- Ze Kalanga (born 1983), footballer
- Mantorras (born 1982), footballer
- Whitney Miguel (born 1991), basketball player
- Rui Marques (born 1977), footballer
- Nando Rafael (born 1984), footballer
- Manuel Sala (born 1982), footballer
- Simão (Angolan footballer) (born 1976)
- Manucho (born 1983), former Manchester United, Hull City and Panathinaikos F.C. footballer

== Clergy ==
- Oscar Lino Lopes Fernandes Braga (1931–2020), Roman Catholic bishop of Benguela since 1975 until 2008
- Manuel Franklin da Costa (1921–2003), Roman Catholic Archbishop
- Damião António Franklin (1950–2014), Roman Catholic Archbishop
- Alexandre do Nascimento (1925–2024), Roman Catholic Archbishop from 1977 to 2001

== Military ==
- João de Matos (1955–2017), military general
- Nzingha, 17th-century queen of the Ndongo and Matamba Kingdoms of the Mbundu people in southwestern Africa – also known as Ana de Sousa Nzinga Mbande

== Musicians ==
- Aline Frazão (born 1988), singer/songwriter
- Anselmo Ralph (born 1981), singer/songwriter
- Ben Cristovao (born 1987)
- Bonga (born 1943), singer/songwriter of Angolan folk music including Semba
- Mylson (born 1994)
- Paulo Flores (born 1972), Semba musician
- Titica (born 1987), an Angolan singer/dancer

== Photographers ==
- Chilala Moco (born 1977), photographer
- Depara (1928–1997), photographer who worked in the Democratic Republic of Congo

== Politicians ==
- Helena Bonguela Abel (born 1957), member of the National Assembly of Angola as a member of UNITA and president of the Angolan Women's League (LIMA)
- Nito Alves (1945–1977), member of the People's Movement for the Liberation of Angola
- Mário Pinto de Andrade (1928–1990), founding member and former president of the People's Movement for the Liberation of Angola
- Mawete João Baptista, ambassador
- Américo Boavida (1923–1968), physician and member of the People's Movement for the Liberation of Angola
- Maria Mambo Café (1945–2013), politician
- Boaventura Cardoso (born 1944), former Minister of Culture
- Abel Apalanga Chivukuvuku (born 1957), politician, member of UNITA, and member of the Pan-African Parliament
- Carlos Contreiras, President of the Republican Party
- Viriato da Cruz (1928–1973), secretary of the People's Movement for the Liberation of Angola
- Alfredo Junqueira Dala, National Assembly member
- António Dembo (1944–2002), politician, rebel and vice-president of UNITA from 1992 to 2002
- Jose Antonio Dias, minister for geology and mines, 1994
- José Eduardo dos Santos (born 1942), President of Angola 1979–2017
- Efigênia dos Santos Lima Clemente, member of the Pan-African Parliament
- Welwitschia dos Santos (born 1979), politician, National Assembly of Angola member
- Aguinaldo Jaime (born 1954), current Deputy Prime Minister of Angola
- Almerindo Jaka Jamba (born 1949), politician, former leader of UNITA
- Maria Monteiro Jardin, Angolan minister for fisheries, 1994
- Antónino Filipe Tchiyulo Jeremias, politician for the UNITA
- Lúcio Lara (1929–2016), founding member of the People's Movement for the Liberation of Angola
- João Lourenço (born 1954), politician, third president of Angola (from 2017)
- Maria Haller (1923–2006), ambassador and writer
- Ana Dias Lourenço (born 1957), Minister of Planning from 1999
- Abel Xavier Nzuzi Lubota, Angolan politician, National Assembly member
- Paulo Lukamba Gato (born 1954), politician, rebel and leader of UNITA from 2002 to 2003
- Idalino Manuel Mendes, Angolan minister for industry
- Marcolino José Carlos Moco (born 1953), Prime Minister of Angola from 1992 to 1996
- José Pedro de Morais (born 1955), Minister of Finance since 2002
- Venâncio da Silva Moura (1934–1999), Minister of External Relations from 1992 to 1999
- Lopo do Nascimento (born 1942), first Prime Minister of Angola serving from 1975 to 1978
- António Agostinho Neto (1922–1979), first President of Angola serving from 1975 to 1979
- Pitra Neto (born 1958), Minister of Public Administration, Employment and Social Security from 1992
- Domingos Manuel Njinga, member of the Pan-African Parliament
- José Patrício, ambassador to the UN
- Alberto Paulino, politician, and National Assembly of Angola member
- Anália de Victória Pereira (1941–2008), leader of the Liberal Democratic Party
- Guilhermina Prata (born 1952), Angolan lawyer, politician and diplomat
- Holden Roberto (1923–2007), politician, Founding member of the National Front for the Liberation of Angola
- Isaías Samakuva (born 1946), politician, and current leader of UNITA
- Jonas Savimbi (1934–2002), politician and leader of UNITA
- Anastácio Artur Ruben Sicato, politician for the UNITA
- Maria Elizabeth Simbrão de Carvalho, ambassador
- Paulo Teixeira Jorge (born 1934), Minister of External Relations from 1976 to 1984
- Fernando José de França Dias Van-Dúnem (born 1952), Prime Minister of Angola from 1991 to 1992 and from 1996 to 1999
- Jerónimo Elavoko Wanga (1934–2007), member of the Pan-African Parliament

== Writers ==
See: List of Angolan writers

- Henrique Abranches (1932–2004), poet
- Antero Abreu (1927–2017), poet
- José Eduardo Agualusa (born 1960), Angola born Portuguese journalist and fiction writer^{[Gikandi]}
- Mário Pinto de Andrade (1928–1990), poet and politician^{[Jahn]}
- Arlindo Barbeitos (born 1940), poet
- Dulce Braga (born 1958)
- Lisa Castel (born 1955), writer and journalist
- Alberto Graves Chakussanga (1978–2010), murdered Angolan radio journalist
- Tomaz Vieira da Cruz (1900–1960), poet^{[Jahn]}
- Viriato da Cruz (1928–1973), poet^{[Jahn]}
- Lopito Feijóo (born 1963), poet
- Isabel Ferreira (born 1958)
- Ernesto Lara Filho (1932–1977), poet
- António Jacinto (1924–1991), poet and political activist^{[Gikandi]} ^{[Jahn]}
- Sousa Jamba (born 1966), Anglophone journalist and novelist
- Alda Lara (1930–1962), poet
- Amélia da Lomba (born 1961), writer and journalist
- Rafael Marques (born 1971), journalist
- Manuel Rui Monteiro (born 1941), poet^{[Gikandi]}
- Agostinho Neto (1922–1979), poet^{[Gikandi]} ^{[Jahn]} ^{[Killam & Rowe]}
- Ondjaki (born 1977), poet, novelist and dramatist
- Pepetela, pen-name of Artur Carlos Maurício Pestana dos Santos (born 1941), writer of fiction^{[Gikandi]}
- José de Fontes Pereira (1838–1891), early Angolan journalist
- Wanda Ramos (1948–1998)
- Oscar Ribas (1909–2004), novelist^{[Jahn]}
- Alcides Sakala Simões (born 1953)
- Ana de Santana (born 1960)
- Arnaldo Santos (born 1936), poet^{[Jahn]}
- Paula Tavares (born 1952), poet
- José Luandino Vieira (born 1935), short-story writer and novelist^{[Gikandi]} ^{[Jahn]}
- Uanhenga Xitu (1924–2014), writer and nationalist

== Journalists ==
- J. M. F. Mena Abrantes
- José Eduardo Agualusa (born 1960)
- Manuel Domingos Augusto (1957–2026)
- Alberto Graves Chakussanga (c. 1978–2010)
- Americo Gonçalves (died 2014)
- Florbela Malaquias (born 1959)
- Joana Martins (born 1969)
- Raúl Correia Mendes (1949–2015)
- Susana Mendes (born 1987)
- Luísa Rogério
- Hariana Verás (born 1984)

== Other ==
- Leila Lopes (born 1986), Miss Universe 2011
- Ana Clara Guerra Marques (born 1962), dancer
- Adjany Costa (born 1990), conservationist and ichthyologist
- Carlos Fernandes (1983–2024), LGBTQ rights activist
- Eunice Nangueve Inácio (born 1948), peace activist
- Reytory Angola, (c. 1626–1689), woman brought to New Amsterdam as a slave, later became a free landowner

== See also ==
- Demographics of Angola
- List of Angola-related topics
- List of Portuguese-language poets
