= List of Angolan writers =

This is a list of Angolan writers, ordered alphabetically by surname.

- Henrique Abranches (1932–2004), poet
- Antero Abreu (1927–2017), poet
- José Eduardo Agualusa (born 1960), Portuguese journalist and fiction writer^{[Gikandi]}
- Fernando Costa Andrade (1936–2009), poet^{[Jahn]}
- Mário Pinto de Andrade (1928–1990), poet and politician^{[Jahn]}
- Mario António (1934–1989), poet^{[Jahn]}
- Gabriela Antunes (1937–2004), folklore
- Arlindo Barbeitos (1940–2021), poet
- Geraldo Bessa Victor (1917–1985), poet^{[Jahn]}
- Dulce Braga (born 1958), autobiographer
- António Cardoso (1933–2006), short story writer^{[Jahn]}
- Mendes de Carvalho, writing as Uanhenga Xitu, politician and Africanist writer in Portuguese and Kimbundu^{[Gikandi]}
- Lisa Castel (born 1955), writer and journalist
- Alberto Graves Chakussanga (1978–2010), murdered Angolan radio journalist
- Maria João Chipalavela
- Tomaz Vieira da Cruz (1900–1960), poet^{[Jahn]}
- Viriato da Cruz (1928–1973), poet^{[Jahn]}
- Alexandre Dáskalos (1924–1961), poet
- Maria Alexandre Dáskalos (1957–2021) ^{[Jahn]}
- Raul David (1918–2005?)
- Lopito Feijóo (born 1963), poet
- Isabel Ferreira (born 1958)
- Ernesto Lara Filho (1932–1977), poet
- Domingos Florentino (born 1953)
- Henrique Guerra (born 1937), short story writer^{[Jahn]}
- Duque Kate Hama (born 1963)
- António Jacinto (1924–1991), poet and political activist^{[Gikandi]} ^{[Jahn]}
- Sousa Jamba (born 1966), Anglophone journalist and novelist
- Kandjila (born 1973)
- Luis Kandjimbo (born 1960), essayist and critic
- Dia Kassembe (born 1946), Francophone writer and novelist
- Alda Lara (1930–1962), poet
- Manuel de Santos Lima (born 1935) ^{[Jahn]}
- Amélia da Lomba (born 1961), writer and journalist
- Reis Luís, or "Mbwanga" (born 1968), Portuguese-language novelist
- João Maimona (born 1955), poet and essayist
- Rafael Marques (born 1971), journalist
- André Massaki (1923–1996), politician and writer^{[Jahn]}
- Joaqim Dias Cordeiro da Matta (1857–1894), folklorist^{[Jahn]}
- Cikakata Mbalundu (Aníbal Simões) (born 1955)
- Manuel Rui Monteiro (born 1941), poet^{[Gikandi]}
- Agostinho Neto (1922–1979), poet^{[Gikandi]} ^{[Jahn]} ^{[Killam & Rowe]}
- Frederico Ningi (born 1959), poet, journalist
- Ondjaki (born 1977), poet, novelist and dramatist
- Ernesto Cochat Osório (1917–2002), doctor and poet^{[Jahn]}
- Pepetela, pen-name of Artur Carlos Maurício Pestana dos Santos (born 1941), writer of fiction^{[Gikandi]}
- José de Fontes Pereira (1838–1891), early Angolan journalist
- Wanda Ramos (1948–1998)
- Inácio Rebelo de Andrade (born 1935)
- Oscar Ribas (1909–2004), novelist^{[Jahn]}
- Alcides Sakala Simões (born 1953)
- Ana de Santana (born 1960)
- Aires de Almeida Santos
- Arnaldo Santos (born 1936), poet^{[Jahn]}
- Maria Perpétua Candeias da Silva, teacher and short story writer^{[Jahn]}
- Paula Tavares (born 1952), poet
- Timóteo Ulika (Cornélio Caley)
- José Luandino Vieira (born 1935), short-story writer and novelist^{[Gikandi]} ^{[Jahn]}
- Ngudia Wendel (1940), guerrilla leader, poet and physician
- Uanhenga Xitu (1924–2014), writer and nationalist
- Mota Yekenha (born 1962)

== See also ==
- List of African writers by country
- List of Portuguese-language poets
