= Ribeira Funda, Cape Verde =

Ribeira Funda
- Settlement
- Coordinates: 16.674°N 24.335°W
- Country: Cape Verde
- Island: São Nicolau
- Municipality: Ribeira Brava
- Civil parish: Nossa Senhora da Lapa

Population (2010)
  - Total: 1
- ID: 31105

Ribeira Funda is a settlement in the northern part of the island of São Nicolau, Cape Verde. It is situated on the north coast, 2 km northwest of Estância de Brás and 8 km northwest of Ribeira Brava.

== See also ==
- List of villages and settlements in Cape Verde
