= Faria =

Faria is a Portuguese and Italian surname.

== Surname ==
- Abbé Faria (1756–1819), a Goan Catholic monk, pioneer of the scientific study of hypnotism
- Aloysio de Andrade Faria, Brazilian billionaire
- Bernardo Faria, Brazilian martial artist
- Betty Faria, Brazilian actress
- Bruno Faria (born 1996), Portuguese politician
- Cândido de Faria (1849–1911), Brazilian caricaturist, painter, lithographer and poster designer
- Catia Faria (born 1980), Portuguese moral philosopher and animal rights activist
- Chico Faria, Portuguese footballer
- Fábio Faria (footballer) (born 1989), Portuguese footballer
- Fábio Faria (politician) (born 1977), Brazilian politician
- Hugo Faria, Portuguese footballer
- Inês Faria, Portuguese actress
- Jacob Faria, American baseball player
- Jacqueline Faría, Venezuelan politician
- João Faria, Portuguese footballer
- Jordan Faria (born 2000), Canadian soccer player
- José Faria (1933–2013), Brazilian footballer and manager
- Lúcia Faria (1945–2024), Brazilian equestrian
- Manuel de Faria e Sousa (1590–1649), Portuguese historian and poet
- Nelson Faria, Brazilian guitarist
- Nicole Faria, Indian supermodel and actress
- Nusrat Faria Mazhar, Bangladeshi film actress and model
- Reginald Faria, Dutch former footballer
- Reginaldo Faria, Brazilian actor and film director
- Reita Faria, Miss World 1966
- Rodrigo Faria, former Brazilian footballer
- Rogério de Faria (Roger Faria) (1770–1848), Luso-Goan businessman
- Ruben Faria, Portuguese motorcycle racer
- Rui Faria, Portuguese football coach
- Walter Faria, Brazilian businessman

== Given name ==
- Faria Alam, former Football Association secretary

== Fictional characters ==
- Abbé Faria a character from The Count of Monte Cristo based on the Catholic monk

== See also ==
- Faria: A World of Mystery and Danger!
