= Air Conditioner (film) =

- Film poster
- Portuguese: Ar Condicionado
- Directed by: Fradique
- Release date: January 2020 (Rotterdam)
- Running time: 72 minutes
- Country: Angola
- Language: Portuguese

Air Conditioner (Portuguese: Ar Condicionado) is a 2020 Angolan film directed by Fradique (Mário Bastos). The film had its world premiere at International Film Festival Rotterdam and premiered June 6, 2020 in Luanda at the We Are One online film festival. The film was shot in 2020 in Luanda by Generation 80.

== Plot ==
When the air-conditioners mysteriously start to fall in the city of Luanda, Matacedo (security guard) and Zezinha (housemaid) have the mission of retrieving their boss's air conditioner.

== Production ==
The film was directed Mário Bastos with the screenplay co-written by Ery Claver. The soundtrack was composed by Aline Frazão.

== Reception ==
The Hollywood Reporter said the film was "A highly accomplished and promising first full-length ...".

== See also ==
- List of Afrofuturist films
