= Bem-Vindos a Beirais =

Portuguese television series

- Developed by: SP Televisão
- Starring: Pêpê Rapazote; Oceana Basília; Sandra Santos; Margarida Cardeal; Dinarte Branco; Inês Faria; Susana Mendes
- Country of origin: Portugal
- Original language: Portuguese
- No. of seasons: 4

Original release
- Network: RTP1
- Release: May 13, 2013 – March 23, 2016

Bem-Vindos a Beirais is a Portuguese television series broadcast by RTP and consisting of four seasons. The first season has 100 episodes and started airing on 13 May 2013 on RTP1. The second season has 80 episodes and premiered on 4 November 2013. The third season has 200 episodes and premiered on 25 February 2014. The fourth season has 260 episodes and premiered in 2015.

== Plot ==
The series is set in Beirais, a fictional village located in the Leiria District. The show is in fact filmed in Carvalhal, Bombarral, some 350 km away from its fictional location.

Before he had a heart attack, Diogo Almada lived in Lisbon. He meets Henrique and sold his agricultural business to Diogo and moved to Beirais.

== Cast ==
- Pepê Rapazote
- Oceana Basílio
- Sandra Santos
- Margarida Cardeal
- Dinarte Branco
- Inês Faria
- Susana Mendes
- Luísa Ortigoso
- Lúcia Moniz
- Luís Aleluia†
- Miguel Dias
- Heitor Lourenço
- Carlos Santos†
- Carla Chambel
- Tomás Alves
- José Boavida†
- Noémia Costa
- Henriqueta Maia
- Pedro Alves

† late actor
