= Queimadas, Cape Verde =

Queimadas
- Settlement
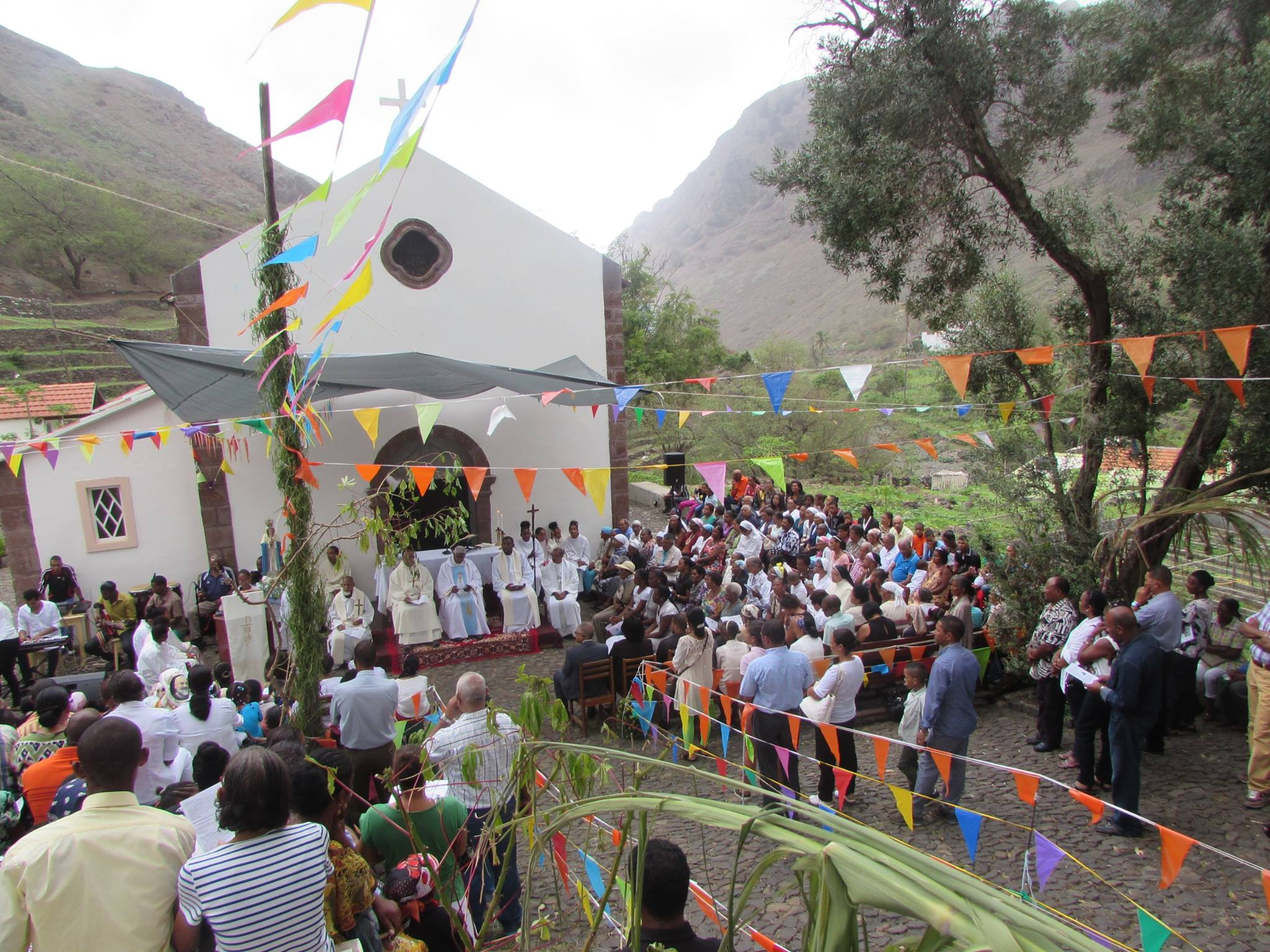

- Location within Cape Verde
- Coordinates: 16.636°N 24.317°W
- Country: Cape Verde
- Island: São Nicolau
- Municipality: Ribeira Brava
- Civil parish: Nossa Senhora da Lapa

Population (2010)
  - Total: 299
- ID: 31104

Queimadas is a settlement in the central part of the island of São Nicolau, Cape Verde. It is situated 3 km northwest of Ribeira Brava. It is part of the municipality of Ribeira Brava and the parish of Nossa Senhora da Lapa.

== See also ==
- List of villages and settlements in Cape Verde
