= Abranches =

Abranches is a surname. Notable people with the surname include:

- Adelina Abranches (1866–1945), Portuguese actor
- Aluizio Abranches, Brazilian film director
- Collin Abranches (born 1991), Indian footballer
- Henrique Abranches (1932–2004), Angolan poet
- Joaquim Abranches (born 1985), Indian footballer
