= Covoada, Cape Verde =

Covoada
- Settlement
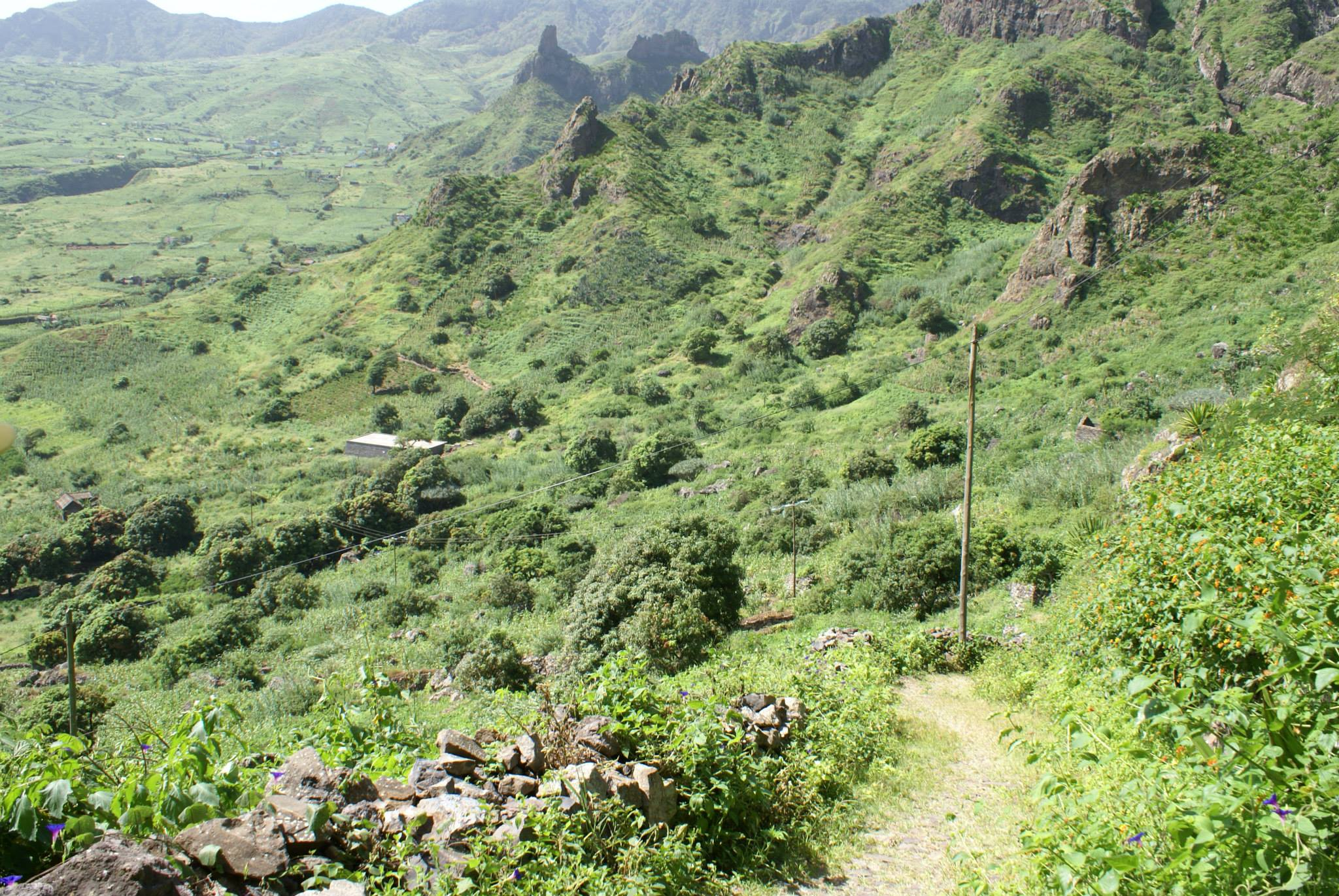

- Location within Cape Verde
- Coordinates: 16.656°N 24.344°W
- Country: Cape Verde
- Island: São Nicolau
- Municipality: Ribeira Brava
- Civil parish: Nossa Senhora da Lapa

Population (2010)
  - Total: 155
- ID: 31101

Covoada is a settlement in the northern part of the island of São Nicolau, Cape Verde. It is situated 7 km northwest of Ribeira Brava.

== See also ==
- List of villages and settlements in Cape Verde
