= Suzana Sousa =

Angolan curator, producer, cultural manager, and researcher

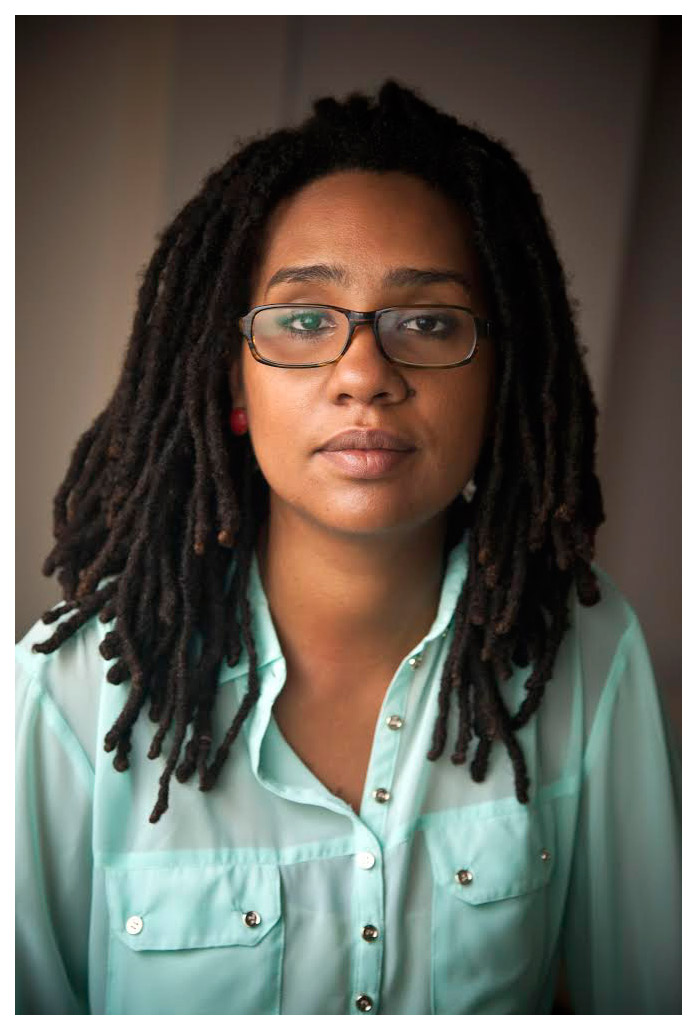
Suzana Sousa

Suzana Sousa (born in Luanda in 1981) is an Angolan independent curator, producer, cultural manager, and researcher. She was Director of the Exchange Office of the Ministry of Culture of Angola. She has curated exhibitions at the Jewish Museum in New York, the Natural History Museum in Luanda, the Berardo Museum in Lisbon, the Almeida Garrett Municipal Gallery in Porto, and the Musée d'Art Moderne de Paris.

== See also ==
- Odile Burluraux, Parisian curator
