= Fajã de Baixo, Cape Verde =

Fajã de Baixo
- Settlement
- Coordinates: 16.647°N 24.328°W
- Country: Cape Verde
- Island: São Nicolau
- Municipality: Ribeira Brava
- Civil parish: Nossa Senhora da Lapa
- Elevation: 278 m (912 ft)

Population (2010)
  - Total: 620
- ID: 31103

Fajã de Baixo is a town in the northern part of the island of São Nicolau, Cape Verde. It is situated 2 km south of Estância de Brás and 5 km northwest of Ribeira Brava.

== Notable person ==
- João Lopes Filho, anthropologist and linguist

== See also ==
- List of cities and towns in Cape Verde
