= Ordem do Vulcão =

Ordem do Vulcão (Portuguese for the Order of Vulcan or Order of the Volcano), also named as the Medal of the 1st Class of Ordem do Vulcão is a national award that is done each year by the President of Cape Verde, it is awarded to the greatest personalities of Cape Verde and non-Cape Verdeans, which contributes to an aggrandizement of the nation. It is the main decoration of the country created after the independence of the nation.

== Ranks ==
It has the following ranks:

- Medal of the 1st Rank
- Medal of the 2nd Rank
- Medal of the 3rd Rank

== Recipients ==
- Eugénio Tavares, 1995
- João Lopes Filho, 2004
- Amélia da Lomba, 2005 - the first non-Cape Verdean to be awarded
- Cesária Évora, 2006
- Mário Lúcio Sousa, 2006
- Edite Borges, 2011
- Gil Semedo, 2011
