= Estância de Brás =

- Settlement
- Coordinates: 16.668°N 24.320°W
- Country: Cape Verde
- Island: São Nicolau
- Municipality: Ribeira Brava
- Civil parish: Nossa Senhora da Lapa

Population (2010)
  - Total: 320
- ID: 31102

Estância de Brás (also: Estância de Braz) is a settlement in the northern part of the island of São Nicolau, Cape Verde. It is situated near the north coast, 2 km north of Fajã de Baixo and 6 km northwest of Ribeira Brava.

== See also ==
- List of villages and settlements in Cape Verde
