= Amélia da Lomba =

Angolan writer, journalist and poet

- Born: Maria Amélia Barros Gomes da Lomba do Amaral; 23 November 1961 (age 64); Cabinda, Cabinda, (Portuguese) Angola
- Occupations: Writer, journalist
- Awards: Ordem do Vulcão

Maria Amélia Gomes Barros da Lomba do Amaral, known as Amélia Da Lomba or Amélia Dalomba (born 23 November 1961 in Cabinda) is an Angolan writer and journalist. She also served as Secretary of the Missão Internacionalista Angolana. Da Lomba was awarded a presidential medal from Cape Verde in 2005.

== Schooling ==
Da Lomba graduated with a degree in Psychology from a Moscow university. A journalist, she worked for the Emissora Provincial de Cabinda, the Rádio Nacional de Angola, and the Jornal de Angola in Luanda.

== Writing and music career ==
According to Luís Kandjimbo, Da Lomba belongs to a group of contemporary female writers in Angola such as Ana Paula Tavares, Ana Santana and Lisa Castel, which he refers to as the "Generation of Uncertainties" ("Geração das Incertezas")—writers who typically display anguish and melancholy in their works, expressing disappointment with the political and social conditions in the country. Her works include Ânsia (1995), Sacrossanto Refúgio (c.1995) and Noites ditas à chuva (Nights' Speeches to Rain, 2005), a poetry book published by the UEA. Her poetry is included in anthologies and books such as Antologia da Poesia Feminina dos Palop (1998), Antologia do Mar na Poesia Africana de Língua Portuguesa do Século XX (2000), and Antologia O Amor tem Asas de Ouro. Da Lomba is a member of the Angolan Writers Union (União dos Escritores Angolanos; UEA).

In addition to her published poems and articles, Da Lomba has recorded CDs of Angolan music.

== National notability ==
Da Lomba served as Secretary of the Missão Internacionalista Angolana. She was awarded the Medalha da Ordem do Vulcão (Order of Vulcan) by the president of Cape Verde in 2005, and is the only non-Cape Verdean to have been awarded this honor to date.

== Selected works ==
- Ânsia, Poesia (1995), UEA
- Sacrossanto Refúgio (1996), Edipress
- Espigas do Sahel (2004), Kilomlombe Publishers
- Noites Ditas à Chuva (2005), UEA
- Sinal de Mãe nas Estrelas (2007), Zian Editora (Publishers)
- Aos Teus Pés Quanto Baloiça o Vento (2008), Zian
- Cacimbo 2000 (2000), Patrick Houdin-Alliance Française de Luanda
- Nsinga - O Mar no Signo do Laço (2012), Mayamba
- Uma mulher ao relento (2011), Nandyala Publishers

=== CD ===
- Verso Prece e Canto (2008), N’Gola Música
