= Odile Burluraux =

French curator

Odile Burluraux is a curator at the Museum of Modern Art, Paris (MAM), organizing large group shows at the institution that have included international artists since the 1990s. She started as an intern at MAM, curating her first exhibition in 1995, working with musician Arnold Schoenberg's paintings.

For Burluraux, curating is a way of bringing together artworks and contributing to the public reception of them. In 2019, 300 works by Hans Hartung were shown in Paris the first time since 1969, organized by Burluraux with the help of her assistant, Julie Sissa, resulting in La Fabrique du Geste, a major retrospective.

In 2021, Burluraux curated The Power of My Hands, which showed works by 16 women artists living in the African continent and the African diaspora. The show was organized in collaboration with Angola-based writer and curator, Suzana Sousa, and addressed issues that have long been prominent in women's lives, including the female body, self-representation, sexuality, motherhood, beliefs, and empowerment. The same year, the curator partnered with the ASIA NOW Art Fair, to feature Iranian galleries for the first time, including film projects by ten Iranian women artists, exploring migration, identity, and female subjectivities.
