= Into the Okavango =

2018 American documentary film

- Directed by: Neil Gelinas
- Screenplay by: Neil Gelinas; Brian Newell
- Produced by: Neil Gelinas; Kaya Ensor
- Starring: Steve Boyes; Maans Booysen; Adjany Costa
- Cinematography: Neil Gelinas
- Edited by: Neil Gelinas[Brian Neville
- Music by: Sven Faulconer
- Production companies: National Geographic Documentary Films
- Release date: April 22, 2018 (Tribeca)
- Running time: 88 minutes
- Countries: United States; Botswana; Angola; Namibia; South Africa
- Language: English

Into the Okavango is a 2018 American National Geographic documentary film written, directed and produced by Neil Gelinas. It focuses on a team of modern-day explorers who go for a 1500 mile, four-month expedition through Angola, Botswana and Namibia to save the Okavango River that joins the Okavango Delta. The film was predominantly shot in Angola and Botswana. It was released on 22 April 2018 and gained critical acclaim for the portrayal of wildlife. It was also screened at a handful of international film festivals and won several awards and nominations.

== Cast ==
- Maans Booysen
- Steve Boyes
- Paul Skelton
- Bill Branch
- Gotz Neef
- Tumeletso Setlabosha
- Adjany Costa

== Synopsis ==
A passionate conservation biologist brings together a river bushman fearful of losing his past and a young aspiring scientist who is uncertain about her future. They participate in an epic expedition spanning three nations over a four- month period through unexplored and dangerous landscape,aiming to safeguard the wildlife of Botswana and to preserve the Okavango Delta,a UNESCO World Heritage Site.

== Awards and nominations ==
Year	Award	Category	Result
2019	Producers Guild of America Awards (PGA)	Best Documentary Motion Picture	Nominated
2018	News & Documentary Emmy Award	Outstanding Nature Documentary	Nominated
2018	Nashville Film Festival	SPECTRUM Audience Award - Neil Gelinas	Won
