= Lisa Castel =

Angolan writer and journalist

- Born: 1955 (age 70–71); Quela, Malanje Province
- Known for: "Generation of Uncertainties"
- Notable work: Mukanda

Lisa Castel (born 22 December 1955 in Quela, Malanje Province), is an Angolan writer and journalist.

== Career ==
According to Luís Kandjimbo, Castel belongs to a group of contemporary female writers in Angola such as Ana Paula Tavares, Amélia da Lomba and Ana de Santana, whom he refers to as the "Generation of Uncertainties" ("Geração das Incertezas"), writers who typically display anguish and melancholy in their works, expressing disappointment with the political and social conditions in the country.

Castel has worked for the Jornal de Angola and the magazine Archote. She is the author of the poetry collection Mukanda, published in 1988.

== Works ==
- Mukanda, Luanda, Angola : União dos Escritores Angolanos, 1988. OCLC 29273201
