= Jorge Cohen =

Angolan film producer

- Born: Jorge Cohen; 1986 (age 39–40); Luanda, Angola
- Education: University of London; Catholic University of Lisbon
- Occupation: Producer
- Years active: 2008–present

Jorge Cohen (born 1986), is an Angolan film producer. He is best known as the producer of critically acclaimed films Alambamento, Luanda 24/7 and Air Conditioning.

== Personal life ==
He was born on 1986 in Luanda, Angola. In 2009, he moved to Portugal and completed a master's degree in Business Administration from the Catholic University of Lisbon. Then he moved to England and obtained his next master's degree in Global Cultural and Creative Industries from SOAS, University of London in 2018.

== Career ==
In 2009, Cohen made his first production Alambamento, a short film. He was the production director of that short, which received critical acclaim. After the success of the short, he became the co-founder of production company 'Geração 80' in 2010. Later he made several short films including: Luanda 24/7, Havemos de Voltar and 1999 as well as documentaries; Triângulo, Independência directed by Mário Bastos. The documentary Independência won the award for the Best Documentary at the Cameron International Film Festival and was an Official Selection at the Durban International Film Festival, Luxor African Film Festival and the Pan African Film Festival.

His 2013 film Triângulo was an Angola-Brazil-Portugal co-production. In 2014, he produced television documentary Afripedia Angola as a Sweden-Angola co-production. IN 2017, he produced the documentary El Último País which was directed by Cuban director Gretel Marín. The film made Official Selection of the Amsterdam Festival 2017 as well. In 2020, he made his first fictional feature film, Air Conditioning.

== Filmography ==
Year	Film	Role	Genre	Ref.
2011	Alambamento	Line producer	Short film	
2011	Luanda 24/7	Executive producer, writer	Short film	
2013	Triângulo	Producer	Documentary	
2014	Afripedia Angola	Executive producer	TV series documentary	
2015	Independência	Producer, boom operator	Documentary	
2017	El Último País	Executive producer	Documentary	
2017	Havemos de Voltar	Producer	Short film	
2018	1999	Associate producer	Short film	
2020	Air Conditioner	Producer	Film	
