= Cremilda de Lima =

Angolan children's book author (born 1940)

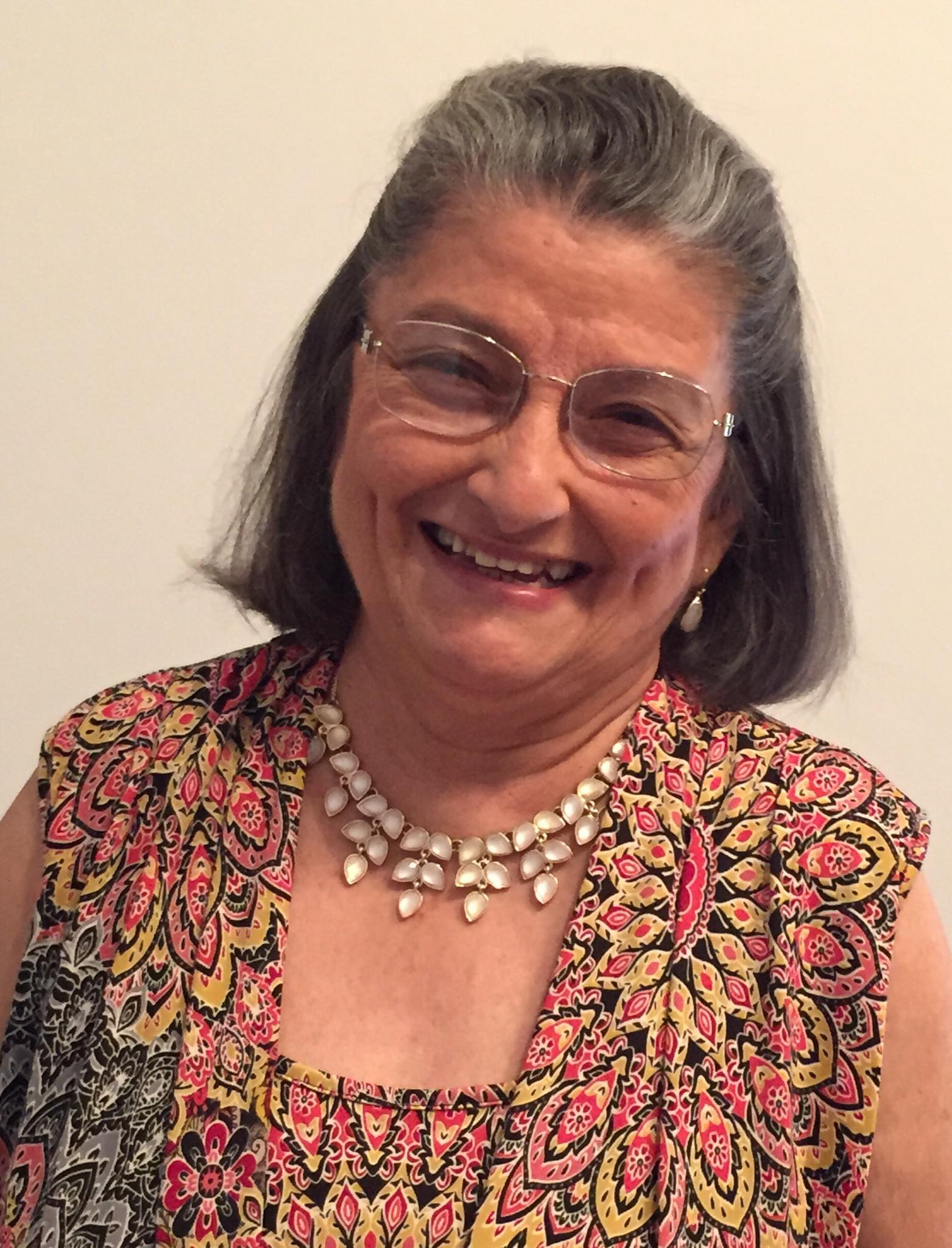
- Cremilda de Lima
- Born: 25 March 1940 (age 86); Luanda, Angola
- Education: Setúbal Higher School of Education; University of Lisbon; Luanda Higher Institute of Educational Sciences; Leiria Higher School of Education
- Employers: Angola Ministry of Education
- Organization: Angolan Writers Union
- Writing career
- Language: Portuguese
- Genre: Children's literature
- Notable work: O Tambarino dourado
- Notable awards: Angolan Ministry of Culture Certificate of Honor; National Prize of Culture and Arts; Astrid Lindgren Memorial Award – Nominee

Maria Cremilda Martins Fernandes Alves de Lima (born 25 March 1940) is an Angolan children's book author.

== Life ==
Cremilda de Lima was born on 25 March 1940 in the capital of the Portuguese colony of Angola, Luanda. After her education she attended several courses for teacher training, first from 1962 to 1963 in Bié, then from 1963 to 1964 in Luanda. Afterwards, Lima began to work as a primary school teacher, first in Malanje. In 1965, she began teaching primary school in Luanda.

After Angola's independence in 1975, new possibilities were opened for Lima with regard to training and work. She joined committee of the Ministry of Education in 1977, which dealt with the development of a curriculum and revision of textbooks. She was a member of committee until 1991.

In 1987, she graduated from a course in scientific and educational area at the Setúbal Higher School of Education, and a Portuguese-didactics course at the University of Lisbon. This was followed by a pedagogy course at Instituto Superior de Ciências da Educação in Luanda from 1992 to 1993 and another in education until 2003 at the Leiria Higher School of Education in Portuguese Leiria.

Lima began writing her first children's books early in life and joined the Angolan Writers Union (União dos Escritores Angolanos) in 1984. Meanwhile, Lima has published numerous children's books and is one of the most famous children's book authors in Angola. She has complained about the lack of dissemination of children's books and lamented that most children of Angola "had never seen a book". Lima called for the creation of a "National Literature Plan". She argued that the ministries of Culture and Education should work together to develop a taste for reading among the youth of Angola.

== Awards ==
Cremilda de Lima has been nominated for the international Astrid Lindgren Memorial Award twice (2008 and 2009). The prize was founded by the Swedish government and is given for commitment and distinguished merit for children and youth literature. In 2008, she was honored the Angolan Ministry of Culture with a certificate of honor for her services to Angolan children's literature. In 2016, Lima received the National Prize of Culture and Arts in the literature category. Jury president António Fonseca called her "one of the pioneers" of Angolan children's literature.

== Works ==
- O Tambarino dourado (1982)
- Os Kandengues desfilam no carnaval (2015)
- Tetembwa Ya Dipanda (auf Kimbundu, 2016)
- Uma Aventura nas Nuvens (2016)
- Brincadeira ao Luar (2016)
