= João Lopes Filho =

Cape Verdean anthropologist

- Born: c. 1943; Fajã de Cima, São Nicolau, Cape Verde
- Occupations: anthropologist, historian, university professor, novelist and investigator
- Writing career
- Notable awards: 1st Rank of the Ordem do Vulcão (2004); Sonangol Literary Award (2011)
- Website: Official website

João Lopes Filho (born c. 1943) is a Cape Verdean anthropologist, historian, university professor, novelist and an investigator.

A specialist in the largest studies and works of appreciation of the Cape Verdean Creole, a Central-Western Atlantic African Creole, he was born in Santa Catarina in Santiago.

He is the main investigator in anthropology and ethnology in the country, he was one of the most awarded professors in the country, he had written about thirty works.

He is a teacher at the University of Cape Verde (Uni-CV), he heads the João Lopes Foundation on Arts and Literature and the Capeverdean Academy of Sciences and Humanities.

== Life and career ==
He was born to João Lopes in the village of Fajã de Cima (also as Fajã de São Nicolau) on the island of São Nicolau which today forms a part of the municipality of Ribeira Brava. The last name Lopes Filho is considered a single surname meaning "son of a Lopes family member". His father was a journalist who was involved in a clairty movement of the island of São Vicente.

During his teenage years, he went to Santarém to study agricultural engineering at Santarém Agricultural School (Escola Agrícola de Santarém), now the Santarém Polytechnical Institute. He later attended at and later graduated from the New University of Lisbon and took courses in anthropological and ethnological sciences as well as social and political sciences at the Technical University of Lisbon (now the University of Lisbon). He was later taught in anthropology with specialised courses in ethnology and aggregation in African Studies taken at UTL.

After completing his studies, he went to become a professor at what was Cape Verde's higher institute of education that is now categorized as a college or a collegiate in Cape Verde in the 1980s, Escola de Formação de Professores e Educadores do Ensino Secundário (EFPES) which is now the Uni-CV's Institute of Higher Education (Instituto Superior de Educação, ISE), he took part in a development commission for Uni-CV. he later became a director of the Coordinate Commission and professor of masters in heritage, tourism and development of the university.

He previously accepted an invitation to teach the doctorate in some post-graduate programs at the New University of Lisbon and the University of Évora.

In 2004, he was awarded the 1st Rank of the Order of Vulcan (Ordem do Vulcão) by the President of Cape Verde, the highest civil award and honour in the country.

In October 2011, he was awarded the Sonangol Literary Award, for the novel Percursos & Destinos, founded by the João Lopes Foundation for Arts and Literature, he raised about US$50,000, he gave the foundation to name of his father.

In January 2014, he was named by the Capeverdean Minister of Education for heading the electoral process for its first rectoral elections for Uni-CV.

Alongside with Jorge Sousa Brito, former rector of the Jean Piaget University of Cape Verde in 2015, he founded the Capeverdean Academy of Sciences and Humanities. Also in that year, he launched a book about António Carreira in June.

== Works ==
- Ilha de S. Nicolau : Cabo Verde : formação da sociedade e mudança cultural, 2 vols, Secretaria-Geral, Ministerio da Educação, Lisbon, 1996, 533 + 515 pages ISBN 972-95047-1-7, ISBN 972-95047-2-5
