= Angolan literature =

Angolan literature has its origins in the mid-19th century. The diversity of Angola's culture is reflected in the diversity of its literature, which traditionally has been combative and satirical.

As Angola was a colony of Portugal, it is a Lusophone country. Most authors write in Portuguese, though there are many distinct tribes and Portuguese is not the first language of every Angolan. In 2006, Luandino Vieira was awarded the Camões Prize, though he declined it and the $128,000USD prize money for "personal and intimate reasons."

Agostinho Neto, the first president of Angola, was a well-known poet.

Cremilda de Lima is one of the best-known Angolan children's writers.

José Eduardo Agualusa was the recipient of the 2017 International Dublin Literary Award.

== See also ==
- Culture of Angola
