= Mylson =

Angolan musician

Edmilson de Carvalho (born 19 June 1994), better known as Mylson, is an Angolan musician.

== Early life ==
Born as Edmilson de Carvalho on 19 June 1994 in Lubango, Angola. He moved to the capital city of Luanda at a very young age, where he gradually developed his passion for music.

== Career ==
Mylson was discovered in 2011 when he was 16 years of age, by Angolan music producer Aires no Beat and manager Mahinga Russo. They were interviewed and featured in the 150th episode of the Portuguese RTP1 TV series Bem-Vindos a Beirais. Mylson has released one official single entitled, "Deixa Eu Te Amar", which was among the top songs of 2014. Mylson performed the song on different TV stations and events, including TPA Hora-Quente, and TPA 2 Tchillar and performed on the most audience TV station TV Zimbo show Made in Angola led by the best known TV producer in Angola DJ Salsa. On 13 September 2014, he performed on the Angola Music Awards for the first time, being one of the most applauded and receiving great reviews from critics. He also featured on DJ Malvado Jr. aka Edy Rodrigues album, on a song entitled Beija-me featuring C4 Pedro.

His album is set to be released and the end of 2014, from LP Produções and featuring Aires no Beat and Symon Sollo as producers and composers.

=== Discography ===
| Title | Composers | Album |
|---|---|---|
| "Deixa Eu Te Amar" | Aires Francisco; Delcio Costa; Edmilson "Mylson" Carvalho; King | Official single |
| "Saudade" | Aires "no beat" Francisco; Airton Culanda; Edmilson "Mylson" Carvalho | Promo single |
| "Cansei" | Aires "no beat" Francisco; Edmilson "Mylson" Carvalho; Justin Chalice | Promo single |
| "Beija-me" | Aires "no beat" Francisco; C4 Pedro | DJ Malvado Jr. (Edy Rodrigues) |
