= Nossa Senhora da Lapa (Ribeira Brava) =

- Civil parish
- Coordinates: 16.66°N 24.31°W
- Country: Cape Verde
- Island: São Nicolau
- Municipality: Ribeira Brava

Population (2010)
  - Total: 1,395
- ID: 311

Nossa Senhora da Lapa is a freguesia (civil parish) of Cape Verde. It covers the smaller northwestern part of the municipality of Ribeira Brava, on the island of São Nicolau.

== Subdivisions ==
The freguesia consists of the following settlements (population at the 2010 census):

- Covoada (pop: 155)
- Estância de Brás (pop: 320)
- Fajã de Baixo (pop: 620, town)
- Queimadas (pop: 299)
- Ribeira Funda (pop: 1)
