= Aline Frazão =

Angolan singer-songwriter (born 1988)

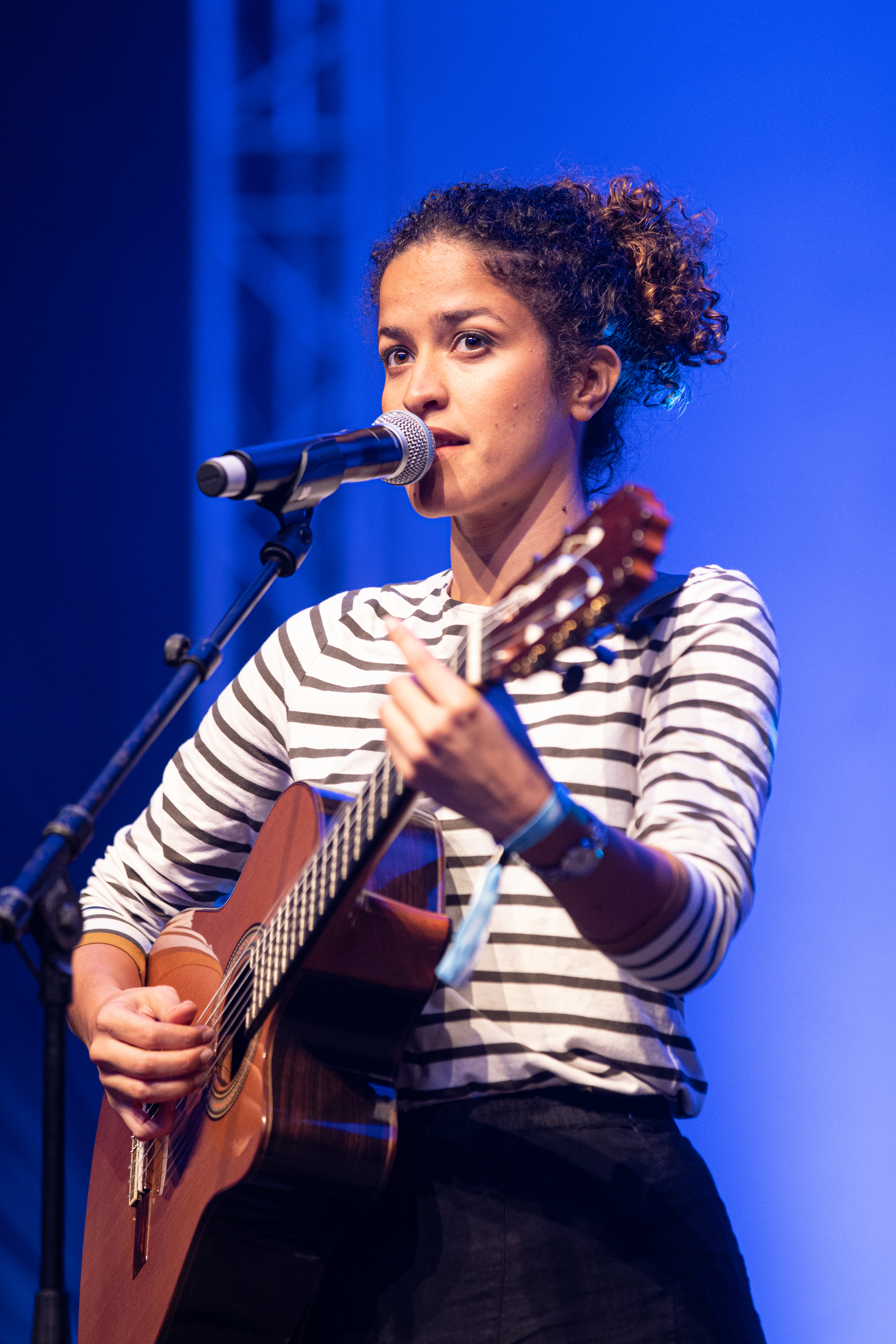
- Aline Frazão in 2020

Background information
- Born: Luanda, Angola

Aline Frazão (born June 1988) is an Angolan singer-songwriter.

== Biography ==
Frazão was born in June 1988 in Luanda, the capital of Angola. While her parents are Angolan, some of her family comes from Portugal and Cape Verde. She has been interested in music since childhood and first began writing songs at the age of 15. Her biggest influence is Paulo Flores. At the age of 18, she moved to Portugal to attend the New University of Lisbon, where she received a degree in communication. After graduation, she worked as a journalist for the newspaper Rede Angola. She became involved in social movements after moving to Spain and was introduced to flamenco.

Her first time in the recording studio was a collaboration with the flautist César Herranz entitled "A Minha Embala". In 2011, after moving to Santiago de Compostela, she released her debut solo album, "Clave Bantu". It has a jazz idiom and features some lyrics written by with Angolan writers José Eduardo Agualusa and Ondjaki. Her second album, "Movimento", was a partnership between her and the Angolan poet Carlos Ferreira and includes a poem by Alda Lara set to music. It came out in 2013.

Frazão released her third album of original material, "Insular", in 2015. It was recorded on the small Scottish island of Jura, chosen for its isolated location, in the studio of the album's producer Giles Perring. Also on this album several musicians provided accompaniment, among others, the Portuguese guitarist Pedro Geraldes and, at the recommendation of Perring, who also played all the percussion, bass player Simon Edwards, clarinettist Sarah Homer, and Scottish harpist Esther Swift of Twelfth Day. It features some lyrics by the Angolan poet Ana Paula Tavares and the Portuguese rapper Capicua. All the songs were new, except the traditional "Susana", which was recorded in Lisbon and is very well known in Angola.

Frazão has toured several countries including Cape Verde, Kenya, Ethiopia, Tanzania, Germany, Brazil, Portugal, Switzerland, Norway and Austria.

Circa 2016, she resides in Lisbon.

Frazão composed the soundtrack for 2020 film Air Conditioner, set in Luanda, Angola, it was directed by Mário Bastos.

== Writing ==
Frazão said that, when touring internationally, she tells the audience she is from Angola and most people could not situate it geographically. She considers songwriting a lonely process but can write a great number of songs quickly.

== Discography ==
=== Albums ===
- Clava Bantu (2011)
- Movimento (2013)
- Insular (2015)
- Dentro da Chuva (2018)
- Uma Música Angolana (2022)

=== Other ===
- A Minha Embala (2011) with César Herranz
