= A Gloriosa Família =

1997 novel by Pepetela

A Gloriosa Família is a novel by the Angolan author Pepetela published in 1997 by Publicações Dom Quixote (Lisbon). The novel deals with the family of Baltasar Van Dum, a Flemish slave trader in Luanda, during the period of time that the Dutch ruled the colony. In order to write the novel, Pepetela undertook painstaking research of the seven years in which the Dutch occupied Angola, using archives located in Amsterdam, Antwerp, and the Vatican.

== Plot synopsis ==
The long novel is composed of 12 chapters, and is set between the years 1642 and 1648. The novel is narrated by a mute mestiço slave, who is one of Van Dum's favorites. In addition to Van Dum and the slave narrator there are many other characters in the novel, most of who are Van Dum's children. A division exists between the legitimate children that Van Dum has had with his legal wife, Dona Inocência, an African princess, and the "filhos do quintal," or the children of the yard, illegitimate children that Van Dum has had with other slaves.

== Historical background ==
The novel takes place during the Dutch occupation of Angola. The Van Dum family of the novel can be seen as having strong parallels to the Van Dúnem family, considered the most eminent of Luanda Creole families.

== Reception and Criticism ==
Many critics look at A gloriosa família as both a celebration and a criticism of Angola's creole population. Fernando Arenas wrote of the ways that novel puts a postmodern spin on the theories of Brazilian anthropologist Gilberto Freyre, eventually critiquing the slave-holding system that is the root of Angolan society. Stephen Henighan describes the novel as illustrating both the "admirable and reprehensible sides of Creole culture." While the family is resourceful and inclusive of other races, they are all also responsible for the slave trade in the interior of the country.
