= Mário Bastos =

Angolan filmmaker (born 1986)

- Born: Mário Bastos; 1986 (age 39–40)
- Other name: Fradique
- Occupations: Director, screenwriter, producer, assistant director, editor
- Years active: 2008–present

Mário Bastos (born 1986), often known by the stage name Fradique, is an Angolan filmmaker. He is notable as the director of the films Alambamento, Independência and Ar Condicionado. Apart from directing, he is also a writer, producer, assistant director and editor.

== Personal life ==
Mario was born in 1986 in Luanda, Angola. As a child, he developed an interest in visual storytelling after receiving his first camera, which led him to explore photography. Bastos experiences with photography helped shape his interest in storytelling and filmmaking. His creative development was supported by Angolan photographer and filmmaker Victorio Henriques, who mentored Bastos and encouraged his creative endeavors. Mario Bastos has continued to maintain strong ties to Luanda, where he contributes to the development of film project centered on Angolan culture and stories.

== Career ==
In 2008, Fradique attended the New York Film Academy and obtained his bachelor's degree in fine arts (directing) at the Academy of Art University in San Francisco. In 2009, he made his first short film, Alambamento. The film won the award for the Best Short Film at the Luanda International Film Festival and was an Official Selection in the Vancouver International Film Festival and Tenerife International Film Festival.

In 2010, Fradique formed the production company Geração 80 with Jorge Cohen and Tchiloia Lara. In 2011, he attended the Berlinale Talent Campus for further studies. Fradique works with Jorge Cohen, Tchiloia Lara, and Sérgio Afonso together to change the Angola film scene by developing new productions based on fiction and documentary style. From 2010 to 2015, he worked on his first full-length documentary, Independência. The film focuses on Angola's liberation struggle and later won Angola's Culture National Prize for Cinema. The film also won the award for the Best Documentary at the Cameron International Film Festival and was an Official Selection at the Durban International Film Festival, Luxor African Film Festival and the Pan African Film Festival.

He also directed art-house music videos for Angolan artists such as Nástio Mosquito and Aline Frazão. In 2020, he made his first fiction film, Ar Condicionado, which had its premier at the Rotterdam International Film Festival. It was the official selection for Uganda at the Fribourg International Film Festival in 2020.

== Influences ==
Bastos participated in the 2022 edition of the Sight & Sound film polls, which are held every 10 years to commemorate the greatest films of all time and rank them in order. Directors and critics both give their 10 favorite films of all time for the poll; Bastos picked Koyaanisqatsi: Life out of Balance (1983), Roma (2018), Touki Bouki (1973), Paris, Texas (1984), Happy Together (1997), Do the Right Thing (1989), Lost in Translation (2003), Eternal Sunshine of the Spotless Mind (2004), Lazzaro felice (2018), and The City of God (2002).

== Filmography ==
Year	Film	Role	Genre	Ref.
2007	Kiari	Director, writer	Short film	
2008	Violent Jake	Assistant director, associate producer	Documentary	
2011	Alambamento	Director, writer	Short film	
2011	Luanda 24/7	Director	Short film	
2013	Triângulo	Director, writer	Documentary	
2014	Afripedia Angola	Writer, editor	TV documentary	
2015	Independência	Director, writer, editor	Documentary	
2016	Bloody Kind of Love	Director	Video short	
2017	The Kingdom of Casuarinas	Director	Film	
2017	El Último País	Assistant editor	Documentary	
2020	Ar Condicionado	Director, writer	Film	
