= Pepetela =

Angolan writer (born 1941)

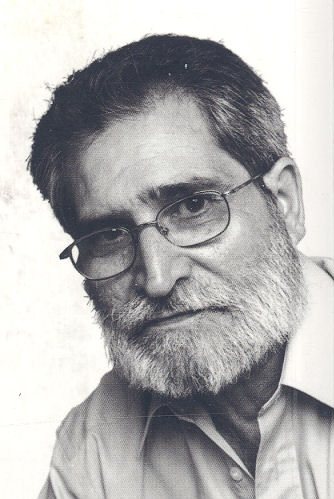
- Born: Artur Carlos Maurício Pestana dos Santos; 1941 (age 84–85); Benguela, Portuguese Angola
- Citizenship: Angolan
- Writing career
- Pen name: Pepetela
- Language: Portuguese

Artur Carlos Maurício Pestana dos Santos (born 1941) is an Angolan writer of fiction. He writes under the name Pepetela.

A Portuguese Angolan, Pepetela was born in Benguela, Portuguese Angola, and fought as a member of the MPLA in the long guerrilla war for Angola's independence. Much of his writing deals with Angola's political history in the 20th century. Mayombe, for example, is a novel that portrays the lives of a group of MPLA guerrillas who are involved in the anti-colonial struggle in Cabinda, Yaka follows the lives of members of a white settler family in the coastal town of Benguela, and A Geração da Utopia reveals the disillusionment of young Angolans during the post-independence period.

Pepetela has also written about Angola's earlier history in A Gloriosa Família and Lueji, and has expanded into satire with his series of Jaime Bunda novels. His most recent works include Predadores, a scathing critique of Angola's ruling classes, O Quase Fim do Mundo, a post-apocalyptic allegory, and O Planalto e a Estepe, a look at Angola's history and connections with other former communist nations. Pepetela won the Camões Prize, the world's highest honour for Lusophone literature, in 1997.

"Pepetela" is a Kimbundu word that means "eyelash," which is a translation of his Portuguese surname, "Pestana". The author received this nom de guerre during his time as an MPLA combatant.

== Early life ==
Pepetela was born in Benguela, Portuguese Angola, to Portuguese Angolan parents. His mother's family had been an influential commercial and military family in the Moçâmedes (present-day Namibe) region of Angola, his great grandfather having been a major in the Portuguese Army. His mother's family had been in Angola for five generations, whereas his father was born in Angola to Portuguese parents and spent much of his childhood in mainland Portugal. Pepetela had a middle-class upbringing in Benguela, attending a school where students of all races and classes intermingled. He has claimed that being raised in Benguela gave him more opportunities to befriend people of other races, because Benguela was a much more mixed city than many others in Angola were during the colonial era. He also claims that he began to develop a class consciousness during his school days, noticing the differences between his own lifestyle and the lives of friends who lived in a nearby slum area. In an interview with Michel Laban, he claims that his upbringing also influenced his political views. He had an uncle who was a journalist and writer and who exposed him to many important leftist thinkers. His father also had a considerable library that allowed the young Pepetela to learn more about the French Revolution, something that influenced him profoundly.

When he was 14, the young Pepetela moved to Lubango (then Sá da Bandeira), to continue his studies because there was no high school in Benguela at the time. In Lubango, Pepetela claimed that he became more aware of the problems of race in Angola, as Lubango was a much more segregated community than Benguela. In Lubango he was influenced by a leftist priest, Padre Noronha, who taught him about the Cuban Revolution and kept him abreast of current events. Upon finishing his schooling in Lubango, Pepetela travelled to Portugal where he began to study engineering. While at the Instituto Superior Técnico in Lisbon he befriended other Angolan students who were associated with the Casa dos Estudantes do Império, the student association of Portuguese students from the overseas. After two years of study he decided that engineering would not fulfill his interests, and he tried to enter the History course at the Faculty of Letters of the University of Lisbon. However, with the start of the Portuguese Colonial War home in Angola, he was summoned to serve in the Portuguese Armed Forces and decided to flee Portugal.

== Frontline experience, early novels, and plays ==
Pepetela first went to Paris and then, in 1963, earned a scholarship to study Sociology in Algiers, where he was approached by Henrique Abranches from the MPLA to help create a Center for Angolan Studies. This Center became the focus of the young Pepetela's work for the next decade. Until 1969, Pepetela, Abranches, and other MPLA members worked together to document Angolan culture and society and publicize the MPLA's struggle. In 1969, the Center moved from Algiers to Brazzaville in the Republic of Congo. After the move to Brazzaville, Pepetela became more active in the MPLA's armed resistance against the Portuguese in the Cabinda region of Angola and on the Eastern Front. This time in the late 1960s and early 1970s served as the inspiration for one of Pepetela's most recognized works, the war narrative, Mayombe. During this time, Pepetela also wrote his first novel, Muana Puó. The novel was written during his time in Algiers and deals with Angolan culture, using the metaphor of traditional masks of the Chokwe people to expose different dichotomies present in Angolan culture. His novel displays the knowledge of indigenous Angolan cultures that Pepetela gained during his time on the Eastern Front of the war for independence. Muana Puó was never intended to be published, a detail Pepetela made clear in an interview with Michel Laban. The author had written the novel as an exercise for himself and several of his close friends to read; nevertheless, the novel was published in 1978, during Pepetela's tenure in the Angolan government.

In 1972, Pepetela published his first novel, As Aventuras de Ngunga, a work that he intended for a small student audience. In this text, Pepetela explores the growth of Ngunga, a young MPLA guerrilla, using an epic and didactic tone. The novel introduces the reader, through the eyes of Ngunga, to the customs, geography, and psychology of Angola. Pepetela also used this work to create a dialogue between Angolan tradition and his revolutionary ideology, exploring which traditions should be nurtured, and which should be altered. As aventuras...is a novel that exemplifies Pepetela's early career, exhibiting a deep love for Angola, a desire to explore Angola's history and culture, a revolutionary spirit, and a didactic tone. The novel was written and published while Pepetela was fighting the colonial government on the Eastern Front in Angola. By contrast, Muana Puó and Mayombe were also written while he was serving on the front, but were not published until after Angolan independence.

When Angola gained independence in 1975, Pepetela became the Vice Minister of Education in President Agostinho Neto's government. The author was a part of the government for seven years, submitting his resignation in 1982 to dedicate more time to his writing. During his tenure as Vice Minister he published several novels, including Mayombe, a novel that had been written when he was an active MPLA combatant in the early 1970s, the publication of which only came about with the explicit support of President Agostinho Neto. During this period, Pepetela diversified his writing, also writing two plays that focused on Angolan history and on revolutionary politics. Pepetela was part of the governing board of the Angolan Writers' Union throughout this period as well.

Pepetela's plays written during his government tenure also reflect the themes in As Aventuras de Ngunga. The first of the plays, A Corda, was the first full-length dramatic work to be published in post-independence Angola. It is a play that, in the words of Ana Mafalda Leite, is "didactic and more than a little ideological, making it of limited literary interest". The play is in one act and features two sides playing a game of tug-of-war over Angola. One side includes the Americans and their Angolan clients, while the other side consists of five guerilla fighters of various ethnicities representing the MPLA. The next play that Pepetela wrote, A Revolta da Casa dos Ídolos, takes place in the past, drawing parallels between the Kongo kingdom in the 16th century and Angola's struggle for independence. Leite writes, "The play remains didactic but it is innovative both in terms of its use of historical material, and especially in the complexities of the actual mise en scène".

== Exit from the government, work published in the 1980s ==
As mentioned above, Pepetela published several novels during his time as a government minister. Of these Mayombe is among the best known. The novel is an account of Pepetela's time as a guerilla in the MPLA. The novel functions on two levels, one in which the characters' thoughts about the nature of the struggle for independence are explored, and another that narrates the "action and incidents" experienced by the nationalist fighters. Ana Mafalda Leite considers the novel to be both critical and heroic, both attempting to highlight the ethnic diversity supposedly celebrated by the MPLA and also illustrating the tribal divisions present in Angolan society, which would lead to the eventual civil war that tore the nation apart in the years from independence until 2002. Leite writes that "the theme of war assumes an heroic and epic dimension since it is a conflict which defines the foundation of the 'fatherland'".

After leaving the government at the end of 1982, Pepetela began to focus exclusively on his writing, beginning work on his most ambitious novel to date, Yaka. Yaka, first published in 1984, is a sweeping historical novel that examines the lives of a family of Portuguese settlers who came to Benguela in the 19th century. A clear desire to research his own origins can be seen in Pepetela's choice to write Yaka. Pepetela himself, as mentioned earlier in this entry, is a descendant of Portuguese settlers in Benguela. Like Muana Puó, Yaka also incorporates traditional Angolan spiritual objects in its narrative technique. Where the first novel focuses on masks, Yaka uses a traditional wooden statue utilized by the yakas, social organizations dedicated to the prosecution of war, to structure the narrative. Ana Mafalda Leite writes, "Yaka symbolises at once the consciousness of traditional values and 'the anticipated spirit of nationality' of the new country". Yaka won the 1986 Angolan national prize for literature.

Pepetela continued to write throughout the decade, publishing O cão e os Caluandas, a novel that looks at the inhabitants of Luanda and the changes that they have undergone since independence, one year after the publication of Yaka. The novel is notable for using the story of a German shepherd's wanderings through Luanda to structure it, and for containing a variety of narrative voices. In 1989, he published Lueji, a work similar to A Revolta na Casa dos Ídolos in that it draws parallels between Angolan history and the contemporary situation in the country. The novel juxtaposes the princess Lueji, an important figure in 17th-century Angolan history, with a young ballerina who is dancing the role of Lueji in a contemporary piece. In the words of Ana Mafalda Leite, "The author writes chronologically of the two women, whose lives eventually begin to merge in the novel." In the novel, Pepetela recreates the history of 17th century Angola. This is a project that he would undertake again with the 16th century in his 1994 novel A gloriosa família.

== New literary directions and the Prémio Camões ==
In the 1990s, Pepetela's writing continued to exhibit interest in Angola's history, but also began to examine the political situation in the country with a greater sense of irony and criticism. His first novel of the decade, the 1992 A geração da utopia, addresses many of the issues first raised in Mayombe, but from the perspective of the post-independence reality of Angola. The Angolan Civil War and intense corruption in the government both led to a questioning of the revolutionary values espoused in the earlier novel. Ana Mafalda Leite describes the novel as "a critical and sceptical book, not to say a book of disillusionment, certainly one far removed from Mayombe's heroic virtues." In this novel, Pepetela analyzes his characters psychologically in greater depth than he had done in his earlier works and assumes a very critical stance. The novel, spanning three decades, is divided into four parts, each of which covers an important aspect of Angola's 20th century, including Portuguese colonial oppression, the war for independence, the civil war, and the brief respite from the war that occurred in the early 1990s. Pepetela's interest in history remained evident in this book, but his criticism of the Angolan establishment was something new that would reappear again and again.

His next novel of the decade, O Desejo de Kianda, published in 1995, continues to manifest the disillusionment exhibited in A Geração da Utopia. The novel takes more of a magical realist approach than any of Pepetela's former works, positing a situation where several of Luanda's largest buildings collapse into Kinaxixi square with all the inhabitants left unharmed. The heroine, a character named Carmina Cara de Cu, leaves her career as a government bureaucrat and becomes an arms dealer. In an essay on the novel comparing the collapse of the buildings that is the focal point of the novel to the attacks of September 11, 2001, Phillip Rothwell writes that the novel "in some ways continues Pepetela's profound and damning portrayal of a betrayed utopia". The next year he published a different sort of novel, A Gloriosa Família. This work examines the story of the Van Dúnem family, a prominent Angolan family of Dutch descent. Pepetela spent years researching the story of the Dutch in Angola in order to write the novel. This novel does not display the same cynical and disillusioned tone as his other novels of the decade did, instead being a broad historical narrative that does incorporate a somewhat magical realist tone. While this novel stands quite apart from much of the author's other work, the fascination with Angolan history prominent throughout his career probably comes to its truest fruition in this work.

As the situation in Angola in the 1990s grew more and more dangerous, Pepetela began spending more time in Lisbon and Brazil. By this point in his life his writing had brought him renown throughout the Portuguese-speaking world. In 1997 he was awarded the Camões Prize, the world's highest honour for Lusophone literature. Pepetela is the first Angolan and the second African author to win this prestigious award.

== Satire and foreign horizons in the new millennium ==
Pepetela has continued to be a prolific writer throughout the 2000s. His work has taken a satirical turn with the series of "Jaime Bunda" novels, detective novels that cast a satirical view on life in Luanda in the new decade. Stephen Henighan writes that the character of Jaime Bunda, a bumbling detective with roots in two of Angola's most prominent families, represents the changes that the Luanda Creole population has undergone in the view of Pepetela. Rather than representing a revolutionary vanguard that will create a new Angolan identity, the Creoles of Luanda are depicted in the novels as a kleptocratic oligarchy. Jaime Bunda is a parody of James Bond, whose name stems from his oversized backside ("bunda" in Portuguese). The character is obsessed with both James Bond films and American private-eye novels, something that Henighan claims is "ideologically charged" and illustrates elements of Angola's underdevelopment. In the first of the novels, Jaime Bunda, agente secreto, published in 2001, the protagonist investigates a murder and rape that eventually leads him to a South African counterfeiter named Karl Botha, a reference to former South African prime minister P.W. Botha, who had mandated the South African intervention in Angola in the 1970s and 1980s. The second novel, Jaime Bunda e a Morte do Americano, published in 2003, is set in Benguela instead of Luanda, and deals with American influence in Angola, as Jaime Bunda investigates the murder of an American and tries to seduce an American FBI agent. This novel also presents Pepetela's critique of U.S. foreign policy, as the heavy-handed behavior of the Angolan police mirrors the ways that Americans dealt with suspected terrorists during the same period. The novels were published by the Portuguese publisher Dom Quixote and were extremely popular in Portugal, having also had some success in other European countries, such as Germany, where Pepetela had been relatively unknown in the past.

Pepetela also published other types of novels during the decade. His first book to be published in the 2000s was A Montanha da Água Lilás (2000), a children's book that also looks at the roots of social injustice. In 2005, after the success of the Jaime Bunda novels, he published Predadores, his sharpest critique of the Angolan ruling class yet. The novel takes place in post-independence Angola and follows the story of Vladimiro Caposso, a lowly bureaucrat who becomes a businessman. Igor Cusack describes the protagonist as a "murderous, philandering businessman gangster ... living in a sea of fellow sharks". Though he began criticizing the nouveau riche class in Angola as far back as A geração da utopia, it can be seen through the Jaime Bunda novels and Predadores that by the 2000s this theme had become a dominant one in Pepetela's work.

The final years of the 2000s have seen a continuation of Pepetela's prolific career, with novels appearing in 2007, 2008 and 2009. The 2007 novel O Terrorista de Berkeley, Califórnia is entirely set in the U.S. and has minimal connection to Angola. The book deals with current attitudes about terrorism and also with aspects of technology present in modern society. As with several of his earlier novels, Pepetela claimed in a recent interview with the Angolan Diário de Notícias that this novel was not intended to be published, but rather that he wrote it for himself. His next novel, O Quase Fim do Mundo (2008), was also written as a personal exercise. It is a work that begins to touch on the realm of science fiction, portraying the challenges facing people who find that they are the last living beings left on earth. These characters, who have survived a global disaster, congregate on a small piece of land in Africa (that Pepetela stresses is very close to where humanity is thought to have originated) and are challenged with attempting to create some kind of new world. This book continues the trend begun with O Terrorista de Berkeley... in that it is not set in Angola, nor does it deal explicitly with the Angolan reality. The last novel of the 2000s, O Planalto e a Estepe, while it does deal with Angola, continues to reflect the internationalization of Pepetela's themes in the past decade. The book deals with a love affair between a white Angolan and a Mongolian whom he met while studying in Moscow. The novel also returns to some of Pepetela's earliest themes of discovering Angolan nature through its descriptions of the protagonist Júlio's childhood in Huíla province.

In addition to dedicating himself to his writing, Pepetela also taught. From 1982 until his retirement from teaching in 2008 he was a professor of sociology in the Faculty of Architecture at the University of Angola, now known as the University of Agostinho Neto. He was a visiting professor at Rutgers University in 2002 and the University of California Berkeley in 2003 and 2004.

== Novels ==
- As Aventuras de Ngunga, 1972 [ English translation: Ngunga's Adventures. A Story of Angola. Trans. Chris Searle. London: Young World Books, 1980]
- Muana Puó, 1978
- Mayombe, 1980 [English translation: Mayombe: A Novel of the Angolan Struggle. Trans. Michael Wolfers. London: Heinemann, 1983]
- O Cão e os Caluandas, 1985
- Yaka, 1985 [English translation: Yaka. Trans. Marga Holness. Oxford: Heinemann, 1996]
- Lueji, o Nascimento de um Império, 1989
- Luandando, 1990
- A Geração da Utopia, 1992 [English translation: The Utopian Generation. Trans. David Brookshaw. Windsor, ON: Biblioasis, 2024]
- O Desejo de Kianda, 1995 [English translation: The Return of the Water Spirit. Trans. Luis R. Mitras. Oxford: Heinemann, 2002]
- Parábola do Cágado Velho, 1996
- A Gloriosa Família, 1997
- A Montanha da Água Lilás, 2000
- Jaime Bunda, Agente Secreto, 2001 [English translation: Jaime Bunda, Secret Agent: Story of Various Mysteries. Trans. Richard Bartlett. Laverstock, U.K.: Aflame Editions, 2006]
- Jaime Bunda e a Morte do Americano, 2003
- Predadores, 2005
- O Terrorista de Berkeley, Califórnia, 2007
- O Quase Fim do Mundo, 2008
- Contos de morte, 2008
- O Planalto e a Estepe, 2009
- A Sul. o Sombreiro, 2011
- Crónicas com Fundo de Guerra, 2011
- O Timido E As Mulheres, 2013
- Crónicas Maldispostas, 2015.
- Se o Passado Não Tivesse Asas, 2016
- Sua Excelência de Corpo Presente, 2018
- Tudo-está-ligado, 2024

== Plays ==
- A Corda, 1978
- A Revolta da Casa dos Ídolos, 1980

== Awards ==
- Camões Prize, 1997
- Prince Claus Award, 1999
- Prémio Literário do Correntes d'Escritas, 2020

== See also ==
- Literature of Angola
- Culture of Angola
- War novel
- Postcolonial literature
