= Americo Gonçalves =

Angolan journalist

Americo Gonçalves (died 2014) was an Angolan journalist.

== Life ==
In the 1990s, Gonçalves founded the weekly newspapers Angolense and later A Capital.

As editor-in-chief of Angolense, in 2000, he and another news editor were convicted of defaming a provincial governor whom the newspaper had accused of incompetence. He received a three-month suspended sentence.

Gonçalves was awarded the Maboque Journalism Prize in 2010 for his services to Angolan journalism.

== Death ==
He died on 2 August 2014.
