= Maria da Piedade de Jesus =

Archaeologist and former Minister of Culture in Angola

- Occupations: archaeologist; Minister of Culture

Academic background
- Education: Paris 1 Panthéon-Sorbonne University

Academic work
- Discipline: Archaeology

Maria da Piedade de Jesus is an archaeologist and former Minister of Culture in Angola.

== Biography ==
Maria da Piedade de Jesus was born in Moçâmedes, Angola. She is an archaeologist who has worked on lithic technology from the Palaeolithic period and on artefacts from the site of Mbanza Kongo. She studied at the Paris 1 Panthéon-Sorbonne University; her MA (2004), Master's of Research (2005), and PhD (2010) all focused on a collection of lithic artefacts from the site of Dungo in Angola. Her PhD was entitled "Recherches sur le paléolithique inférieur de la bande côtière d'Angola: étude comparative techno-typologique et tracéologique du matériel lithique des sites: de Dungo IV; Dungo V; Dungo XII" ("Research into the Lower Palaeolithic of the coastal region of Angoloa: comparative techno-typological and traceological study of lithic material of the sites Dungo IV, Dungo V, Dungo XII").

da Piedade de Jesus has worked as the provincial director of culture in Namibe province and as Director General of the Angolan National Institute of Cultural Heritage. She was appointed Secretary of State for Culture in 2018, and as Minister of Culture in June 2019, a role she held until April 2020.

== Selected publications ==
- Manuel Gutierrez, Claude Guérin, Claudine Karlin, Maria da Piedade de Jesus, Maria Helena Benjamim, Anne-Élisabeth Lebatard, Didier L. Bourlès, Régis Braucher and Laetitia Leanni, "Recherches archéologiques à Dungo (Angola). Un site de charognage de baleine de plus d'un million d'années", Afrique Archelogies Arts 6 (2010), pp. 25–47
- Mafalda Costa, Pedro Barrulas, Luís Dias, Maria da Conceição Lopes, João Barreira, Bernard Clist, Karlis Karklins, Maria da Piedade de Jesus, Sónia da Silva Domingos, Peter Vandenabeele, José Mirão, "Multi-analytical approach to the study of the European glass beads found in the tombs of Kulumbimbi (Mbanza Kongo, Angola), Microchemical Journal 149 (2020)
- Mafalda Costa, Pedro Barrulas, Luís Dias, Maria da Conceição Lopes, João Barreira, Bernard Clist, Karlis Karklins, Maria da Piedade de Jesus, Sónia da Silva Domingos, Luc Moens, Peter Vandenabeele, José Mirão, "Determining the provenance of the European glass beads of Lumbu (Mbanza Kongo, Angola)", Microchemical Journal 154 (2020)
