= Minister of Culture, Tourism and the Environment (Angola) =

Minister of Culture, Tourism and the Environment of Angola is a cabinet level position in the national government. In 2020, three ministries merged into the new Ministry of Culture, Tourism and the Environment to cut costs amid the COVID-19 pandemic.

== Name changes ==
The position of Minister of Culture was established in 1975 with António Jacinto as the first to hold the position.

- 1975–1995: Secretary of State for Culture
- 1995–2020: Minister of Culture
- 2020-present: Minister of Culture, Tourism and Environment

== Ministers ==
- 1975–1981: António Jacinto
- 1981–1990: Boaventura da Silva Cardoso
- 1990–1992: José Mateus de Adelino Peixoto
- 1995–1999: Ana Maria de Oliveira
- 1999–2002: António Burity da Silva
- 2002–2008: Boaventura da Silva Cardoso
- 2008–2016: Rosa Maria Martins da Cruz e Silva
- 2016–2019: Carolina Cerqueira
- 2019–2020: Maria da Piedade de Jesus
- April–October 2020: Adjany Costa
- November 2020–October 2021: Jomo Fortunato
- October 2021–present: Filipe Zau
