= Adjany Costa =

Angolan biologist (born 1989)

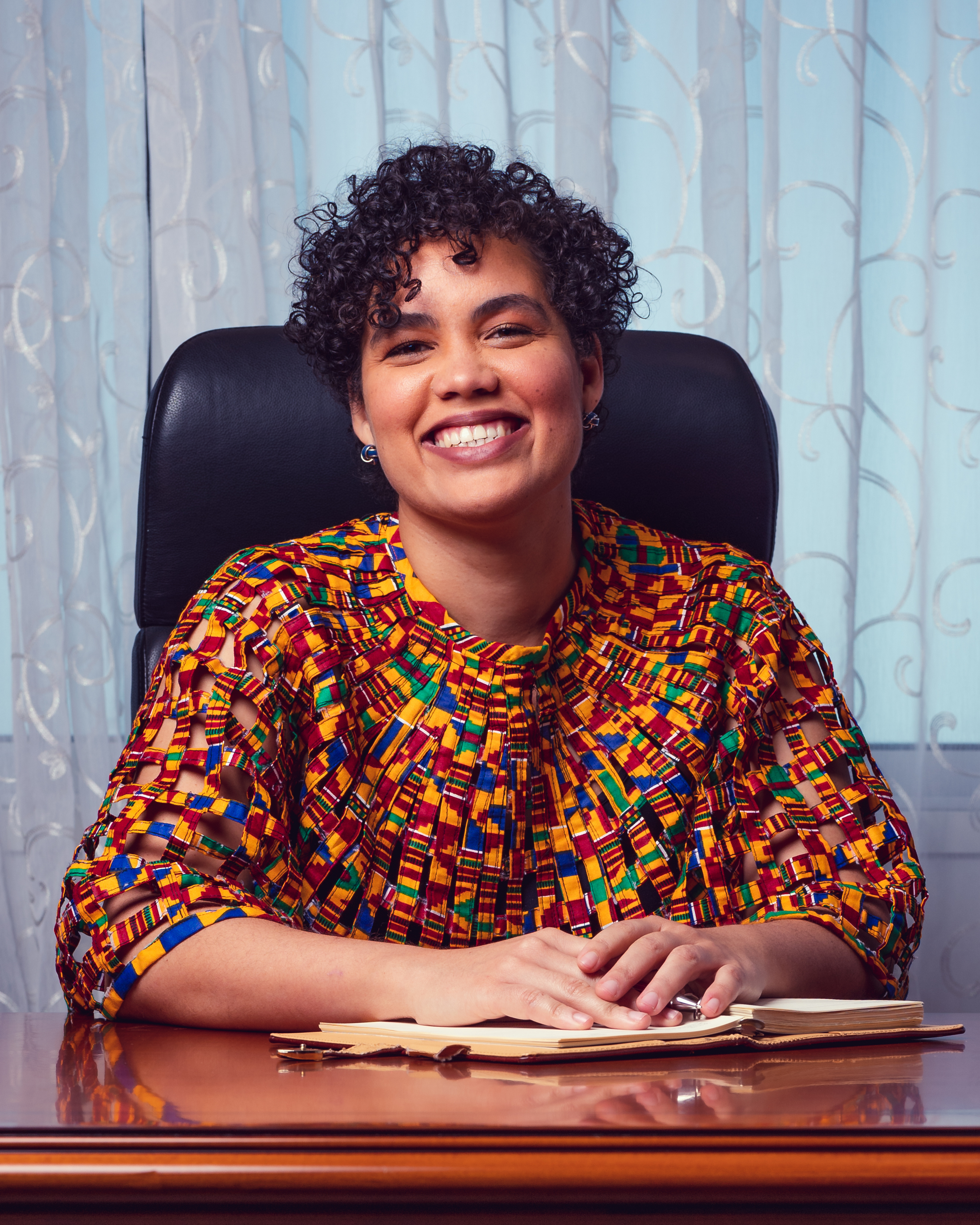
- Born: 1989 (age 36–37)
- Education: University of Oxford (PhD)
- Occupations: Biologist; Conservationist
- Notable work: Served as the Angolan Minister of Culture, Tourism and Environment from April to October 2020.

Adjany da Silva Freitas Costa (born 1989) is an Angolan biologist and conservationist from Huambo who served as the Angolan Minister of Culture, Tourism and Environment from April to October 2020.

== Career ==
=== Conservation and environmentalism ===
Costa has a master's degree in biology and a PhD in International Wildlife Conservation Practices from the University of Oxford.

In 2015, Costa was part of a trip from Angola to the town of Maun, Botswana via mokoro to demonstrate the connectivity of the Okavango River and the impact of the Angolan Civil War on the environment of the country. This formed the basis of the 2018 documentary film Into the Okavango, in which she appears.

Costa was the African winner of the United Nations Environment Programme Young Champions of the Earth award in 2019 for her advocacy to protecting the Okavango Delta. She was also awarded the Angolan First Order of Civil Merit in 2019. She received this in recognition for her community-based conservation work with the Luchaze people of the Eastern Angolan highlands and the Okavango Delta. She is a National Geographic Explorer.

=== Political career ===
She was appointed the position of Minister of Culture, Tourism and Environment in April 2020 at the age of 30, making her the youngest minister in Angolan history. She was later removed from the position in October 2020 by President João Lourenço and kept as a consultant to the President.
