= Abbé Faria (The Count of Monte Cristo) =

Character from the Count of Monte Cristo

- The Count of Monte Cristo character
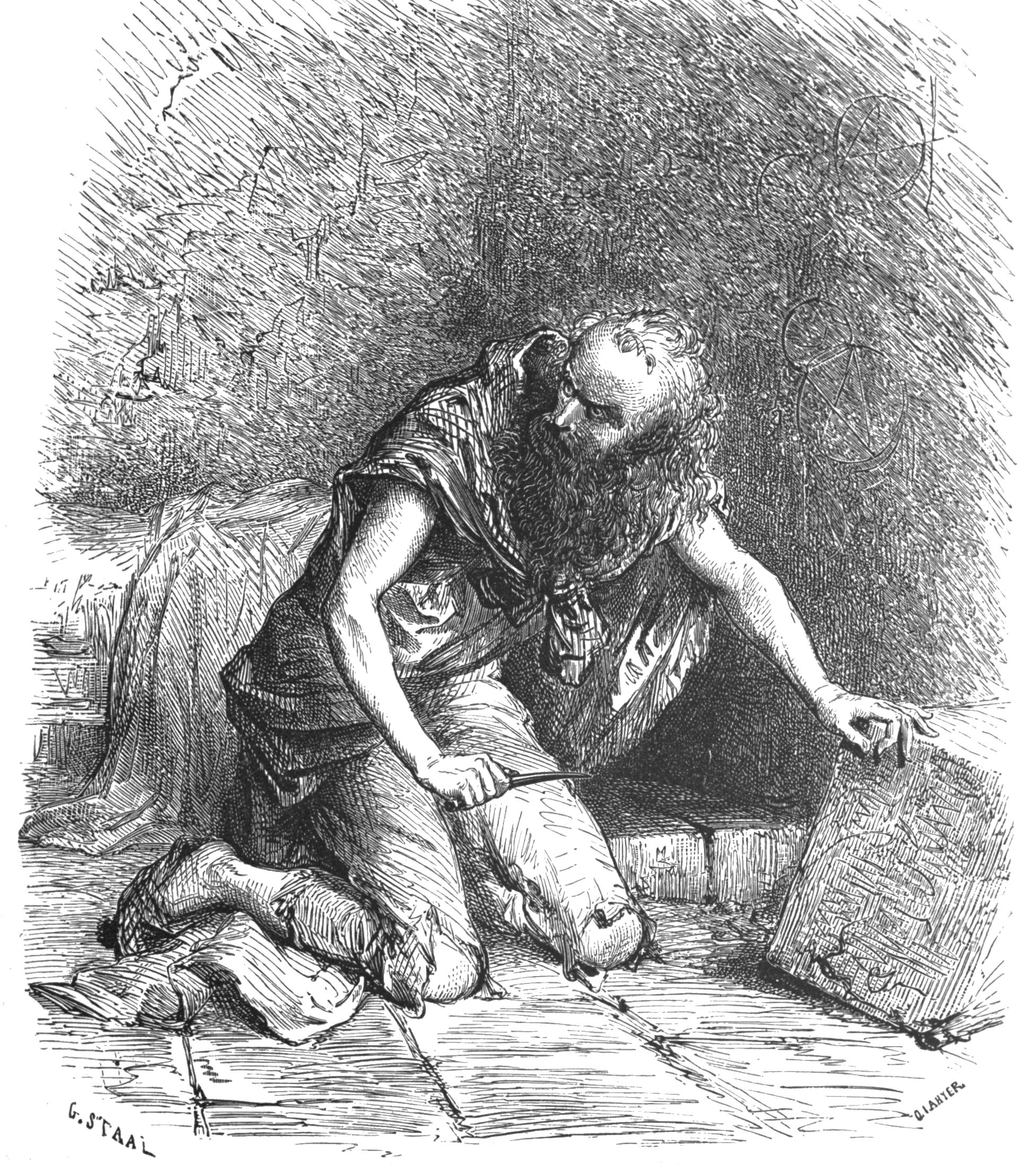
- Illustration of the Abbé Faria by Pierre-Gustave Staal (1888).
- Created by: Alexandre Dumas
- Based on: Abbé Faria
- Portrayed by: Marc Gérard; Spottiswoode Aitken; Bernhard Goetzke; O. P. Heggie; Julio Villarreal; Ermete Zacconi; Colin Campbell; Francisco López Silva; Gualtiero Tumiati; Henri Guisol; Pierre Brasseur; Trevor Howard; Alexei Petrenko; Richard Harris; Pierfrancesco Favino
- Voiced by: Ray Collins; Alan Wheatley; Mir Afsar Ali

In-universe information
- Nicknames: "Mad Priest"; "The Mad Abbé; "The Abbé"
- Gender: Male
- Occupation: Secretary to the last Count of Spada
- Religion: Roman Catholic
- Nationality: Italian

The Abbé Faria (pronounced [ˈa.bɛ fɑːˈri.ə]) is a fictional character in the 1846 adventure novel The Count of Monte Cristo by Alexandre Dumas. In the novel, he is the companion and mentor of the protagonist Edmond Dantès during his captivity in the infamous prison Chatêau d'If. Throughout the beginning of the story he helps Dantès deduce the culprits of his imprisonment, and teaches him all he knows about reading, mathematics, science, languages, philosophy, history, sword fighting, and economics. After the first of three hereditary attacks of catalepsy, he reveals the location of a vast hereditary treasure belonging to his former employer, the Count of Spada. After his death, Dantès takes his place in the body bag and recovers the treasure, subsequently transforming into the titular Count of Monte Cristo. The Abbé is a heavily fictionalised version of the real-life Portuguese Abbé José Custódio de Faria.

== Character ==
=== Appearance ===
In his first introduction, Dumas describes him as a man of small stature, with white, unkempt hair, bearing the physical toll of fourteen years spent in a damp, dark prison cell. His beard, however, is still black, and is described as "reaching down to his breast". His eyes are deep-set and expressive beneath his bushy grey eyebrows; Dantès estimates him to be around sixty years old. His clothing is ragged and he looks malnourished, and while his face is wrinkled, Dumas describes him as "a man more accustomed to exercise his moral faculties than his physical strength".

=== Personality ===
Despite what the guards believe, Abbé Faria maintains mental stability during his solitary confinement, mainly through keeping busy by crafting tools, writing essays and historical accounts, and by deducing his escape plan. He helps Dantès deduce the conspirators that put him in prison by analysing the circumstances of Dantès' imprisonment. Due to his religious background, this causes the Abbé to develop feelings of guilt, as he realises that he has generated a desire for revenge in his companion. Throughout their captivity, Faria begins to develop a paternal bond with Dantès, exclaiming, "You are my son, Dantès. [...] God has sent you to me to console, at one and the same time, the man who could not be a father and the prisoner who could not get free." after revealing the secret of the Spada treasure.

== History ==
=== Early life and service to Count Spada ===
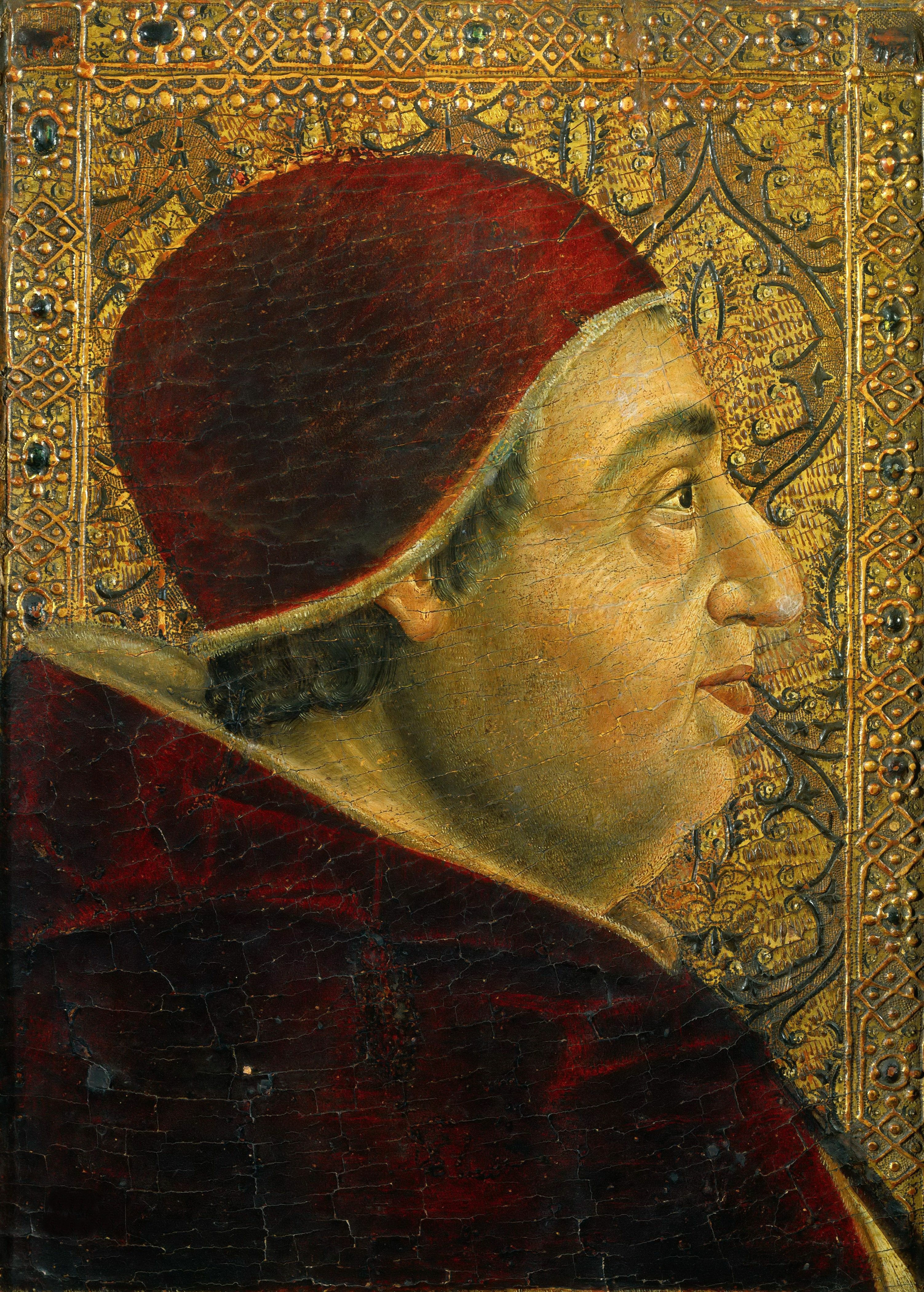
Portrait of Pope Alexander VI, the father of Cesare Borgia.

According to the Abbé, he was born in Rome, Italy. During his early life he engaged in academic pursuits, mastering mathematics, physics, and history. He learns to speak five living languages, along with Ancient Greek and Latin. After his academic career, he enters the priesthood and becomes a Catholic abbé in Rome. Later, he seeks employment and secures a position as a personal secretary to Cardinal Spada, who tells Faria about his family history. After France's defeat in the Italian Wars, the Pope Alexander VI and his son Cesare Borgia deduced a scheme to raise money to fund their political pursuits in the wars' aftermath. Pope Alexander VI created two Cardinal positions for Giacomo Rospigliosi and Cesare Spada, then two of the wealthiest men in Italy, in order to profit off of their fortunes. After accepting their positions, the two cardinals were invited to dine with the Pope, which would lead to their poisoning and subsequent deaths. After rushing to claim the two men's inheritances, Alexander VI and his son realise that Cardinal Spada wasn't as rich as previously thought, and the two later meet untimely deaths with unfulfilled dreams of a unified Italy.

The professional relationship of the Abbé and Cardinal Spada continues for twenty years, where Faria manages the daily affairs of the household and eventually gains access to the family archives. When Spada dies, he leaves all of his inheritance to Faria. Among the inheritance is the family library, containing a collection of 5000 volumes, among them the family breviary. Faria accepts the inheritance and the task to complete the Spada family tree. On the 25th of December 1807, while researching for his project, he falls asleep in the library. After he wakes up, he decides to light an old bookmark to use as a light source, as his candle has burned out. After lighting the corner of it, he notices invisible ink appearing from the heat. The text turns out to be a secret message written by Cesare Spada in 1498. The letter explains that Cesare Spada already knew of his fate before he went to dine with the Pope, and hid the vast Spada fortune on the island of Monte Cristo to prevent it from falling into the hands of him and his son Cesare Borgia.

=== Political activism, imprisonment and death ===
After completing his duty in the service of the Spada family, Faria pursued his dream of a unified Italian state, which puts him in opposition to both the fragmented kingdoms of the Italian peninsula and the occupying Napoleonic army. His vocal opposition to the French empire and leadership within a growing nationalist movement ultimately leads to his arrest by gendarmes when leaving the city of Piombino in early 1811, condemning him to life in prison without a trial. The authorities transport him to the Chatêau d'If, an island prison off the coast of Marseilles, where he is placed in solitary confinement under the classification of a dangerous political prisoner.

Despite his incarceration, Faria maintains his intellectual rigor by secretly crafting tools, writing a comprehensive account on the political history of Italy using improvised materials, and engineering an escape tunnel. After years of tunneling through the solid stone of the fortress walls, a miscalculation in his measurements causes him to inadvertently break into the neighboring cell of the falsely imprisoned French sailor Edmond Dantès in the year 1821. Recognising the young man's despair and potential, the Abbé assumes the role of his mentor, dedicating the next several years to educating Dantès in mathematics, science, economics, history, and languages. Furthermore, Faria helps Dantès deduce the identities and motives of the conspirators responsible for his imprisonment.

As his years in prison take their physical toll, Faria begins to suffer from a severe hereditary neurological condition characterised by debilitating cataleptic seizures. Realising that his deteriorating health will prevent him from completing his escape plan or claiming the Spada fortune himself, entrusts Dantès with the coordinates and history of the treasure on the uninhabited island of Monte Cristo. Following a final, fatal seizure in 1829, he inadvertently helps Dantès escape from the Chatêau d'If, as Dantès transfers his corpse to his own cell and sews himself inside the burial sack, subsequently being thrown into the sea by the prison guards.

== Depictions in other media ==
=== Films ===
Year	Actor	Role	Film
1918	Marc Gérard	L'abbé Faria	Le Comte de Monte Cristo
1922	Spottiswoode Aitken	Abbe Faria	Monte Cristo
1929	Bernhard Goetzke	Abbe Faria	Monte Cristo
1934	O. P. Heggie	Abbé Faria	The Count of Monte Cristo
1942	Julio Villarreal	Abate Faria	El Conde de Montecristo
1943	Ermete Zacconi	L'abbé Faria	Le comte de Monte Cristo, 2ème époque: Le châtiment
1953	Francisco López Silva	Abate Faria	El Conde de Montecristo
1954	Gualtiero Tumiati	L'abbé Faria	Le Comte de Monte-Cristo (1ère époque): La Trahison
1961	Henri Guisol	L'abbé Faria	Le Comte de Monte Cristo
1968	Pierre Brasseur	Faria	Sous le signe de Monte-Cristo
1975	Trevor Howard	Abbé Faria	The Count of Monte Cristo
1988	Alexei Petrenko	Abbé Faria	Uznik zamka If
2002	Richard Harris	Abbé Faria	The Count of Monte Cristo
2024	Pierfrancesco Favino	Abbé Faria	Le Comte de Monte-Cristo

=== Television ===
Year	Actor	Role	Film
1956	Cyril Delevanti	Abbe Faria	The Count of Monte Cristo
1964	John Wentworth	Abbé Faria	The Count of Monte Cristo
1966	Sergio Tofano	Faria	Il Conte di Montecristo
1977	Guan Haishan	Yè Chéngyīn	Dà Bàofù
1979	Henri Virlogeux	L'abbé Faria	Le Comte de Monte-Cristo
1998	Georges Moustaki	Abbe Faria	Le Comte de Monte Cristo
2024	Jeremy Irons	Abbé Faria	The Count of Monte Cristo

=== Radio adaptions ===
Year	Actor	Role	Film
1938	Ray Collins	Abbé Faria	The Mercury Theatre on the Air
1939	Everett Sloane	Abbé Faria	The Campbell Playhouse
1987	Alan Wheatley	L'Abbe Faria	The Count of Monte Cristo
