= Luísa Rogério =

Angolan journalist

Maria Luísa Rogério
- Born: Rogério; Luanda
- Citizenship: Angola
- Occupation: journalist
- Employers: AMUJA; Angolan Journalists' Union; Rede Angola; Jornal de Angola
- Notable work: Raad Somali
- Awards: African Federation of Journalist; Comissão da Carteira e Ética Profissional (CCE; English Professional Ethics Commission)

Maria Luísa Rogério is an Angolan journalist. She also serves as the head of the country's Card and Professional Ethics Commission and has been a member of the Executive Committee of the International Federation of Journalists since 2019.

== Career ==
Rogerio began working in journalism in the late 1980s, starting in 1985 as an intern in the state-owned Jornal de Angola.

In 1999 and 2000, she was executive director of AMUJA, the association of women journalists in Angola. Between 2004 and 2015, Rogerio was the secretary general of the Angolan Journalists' Union. In 2013, she was elected vice-president of the African Federation of Journalists. In 2019, she was made leader of the newly created Comissão da Carteira e Ética Profissional (CCE; English: Card and Professional Ethics Commission), an independent law body which accredits journalists in Angola, monitors journalists' performance, and addresses violations of ethics in journalism.

Rogerio has covered a variety of stories both at home and abroad, including the Lusaka Protocol and the 2018 DRC general election. She has written for Jornal de Angola and Rede Angola.

She has consistently spoken out against press censorship in Angola and advocated for freedom of the press. She has also supported the ability of foreign journalists to work in and report from Angola.

== Personal life ==
Rogerio was born in Luanda. She is a single mother to three children.
