= Manuel Sala =

Angolan footballer

Personal information
- Date of birth: May 5, 1982 (age 44)
- Place of birth: Angola
- Position: Defender

International career
| Years | Team | Apps | (Gls) |
| 2003–2004 | Angola | 6 | (0) |

Manuel Sala (born May 5, 1982) is an Angolan football player. He has played for Angola national team.

== National team statistics ==
Angola national team
| Year | Apps | Goals |
|---|---|---|
| 2003 | 3 | 0 |
| 2004 | 3 | 0 |
| Total | 6 | 0 |
