= Boaventura Cardoso =

Angolan politician (born 1944)

Secretary of State for Culture of Angola
- In office 1981–1990
- Preceded by: António Jacinto
- Succeeded by: José Peixoto

Minister of Information of Angola
- In office 1990–1991
- Preceded by: João Filipe Martins
- Succeeded by: Rui Óscar de Carvalho

Ambassador of Angola to France
- In office 1992–1999
- Preceded by: Elísio de Figueiredo
- Succeeded by: Assunção dos Anjos

Ambassador of Angola to Italy
- In office 1999–2002
- Preceded by: Antero de Abreu
- Succeeded by: Pedro Sebastião

Minister of Culture of Angola
- In office 2002–2008
- Preceded by: António Burity
- Succeeded by: Rosa da Cruz e Silva

Governor of Malanje
- In office 2008–2012
- Preceded by: Cristóvão da Cunha
- Succeeded by: Norberto dos Santos

Personal details
- Born: July 26, 1944 (age 82) Luanda, Angola
- Party: MPLA

Boaventura da Silva Cardoso (born 26 July 1944) is an Angolan politician as well as noted author. He has been the Minister of Culture since December 2002 until 2008.

He served as Angola's Minister of Culture on two occasions: from 1981 to 1990 (during that period, secretary with ministerial status) and from 2002 to 2008. He was also Minister of Information from 1990 to 1991, governor of Malanje from 2008 to 2012, and the first president of the Angolan Academy of Letters, from 2016 to 2020.

== Biography ==
Boaventura Silva Cardoso was born in Luanda on July 26, 1944. He spent part of his childhood in Malanje, moving to Luanda to complete his primary and secondary education. He began his training in social sciences at the School of Cadres of the Popular Movement for the Liberation of Angola (MPLA), completing his degree in Social Sciences at the Pontifical University of Saint Thomas Aquinas.

During the colonial period, he was an employee of the Treasury and Accounting Services. After the Independence of Angola, he held various positions, such as director of the National Institute of Book and Record (INALD) from 1977 to 1981, Secretary of State for Culture (with ministerial status) from 1981 to 1990, and Minister of Information from 1990 to 1991.

He was then assigned to the diplomatic career as Angola's ambassador to France, Italy, and Malta, representative of Angola to the United Nations (specifically for the FAO, WFP, and IFAD agencies/programs) and, for eight years (2002 to 2010), again as Minister of Culture.

Between 2010 and 2012, Boaventura Cardoso served as governor of the province of Malanje.

== Literature ==
In 1967 he began writing, publishing several short stories and poems in newspapers and magazines in Luanda. He was a member of the Editorial Commission of the magazine Angola of the National African League and is a founding member of the Union of Angolan Writers.

He is part of the Angolan "generation of the 70s," alongside many other contemporary writers, namely: Manuel Rui, Jofre Rocha, Ruy Duarte de Carvalho, and Jorge Macedo. Like the work of other authors of this generation, his texts are characterized by a strong panegyric tendency towards revolutionary values and ideals, where the certainty of independence and freedom is celebrated through aesthetically elaborate writing and the result of reflection on the literary phenomenon, constituting, therefore, a metalinguistic process in which the authors also reflect on the socio-political reality of their country.

Within the scope of his narrative work, the records of the speeches that shape his narratives, deeply marked by orality, are worked on by the author, with wisdom and substance, in order to establish a close relationship between the physical and social reality surrounding the characters and their linguistic and phonetic reality.

Aware of the "Being Portuguese Language," as his fellow writer Luandino Vieira affirms in the preface to his work Maio, Mês de Maria, Boaventura Cardoso uses the so-called improper diglossia as an important instrument for questioning the literary language, through which he explores the potentialities of the linguistic system. His last two novels, set in different temporal contexts, maintain a deep bond between them, whose knot tightens through the way the stories are structured.

== Publications ==
- Dizanga Dia Muenhu (1977)
- O Fogo da Fala (1980)
- A Morte do Velho Kipacaça (1987)
- O Signo do Fogo (1992)
- Maio Mês de Maria (1997)
- Mãe Materno Mar (2001)
- Noites de Vigília (2012)
- Margens e Travessias (2021)
- Frutos Estranhos Pendurados na Mulemba (2026)

== Honor(s) ==
In 2001, he received the National Culture and Arts Award for his novel Maternal Mother Sea.

And in 2006, he received the medal of cultural merit from the Brazilian government.

He was honored on January 31, 2009, at the Academy of Letters of the State of Tocantins, Federative Republic of Brazil, on the occasion of the launch of his recent literary works. On that occasion, he presented a dissertation on Angolan literature and his literary writing process.

== Sources ==
- Profile of Boaventura Cardoso (in Portuguese)
