= María Perpétua Candeias da Silva =

- Born: 1932; Huíla Province

María Perpétua Candeias da Silva (born 1932) is an Angolan Portuguese-language writer.

María Perpétua Candeias da Silva was born in 1932 in near Caconda in the Huíla Province of Angola. She became a language teacher, specializing in Umbundu.

Her fiction focuses on the Ovimbundo people of Angola. Her first story was "Nihova" (1949). She published two stories, "A mulher de duas cores" and "Falsos trilhos", together in 1959. The protagonist of her story "O homem enfeitiçado" ("The Hexed Man," 1961) is Salupassa, who is ostracized and alone because he has not undergone the ritual circumcision considered a rite of passage into adulthood. Her novella, Navionga, filha de branco ("Navionga, White Man’s Daughter," 1966), focuses on a mixed-race woman. Her short story "Escrava" was included in the anthology Novos contos d’Äfrica (1962).

== Bibliography ==
- A mulher de duas cores. Falsos trilhos. Ganda, Angola, 1959 62 p.
- O homem enfeitiçado. Sa da Bandeira: Püblicaçoes Imbondeiro 1961. 31 p. , illus. (Colecçâo Imbondeiro 20)
- Navionga, filha de branco. Lisbon: Agência-Geral do Ultramar 1966. 155 p. (Colecçâo Unidade.)
