= J. M. F. Mena Abrantes =

Angolan journalist

Jose Meanuel Reio Mena Abrantes is an Angolan journalist, theatre critic and playwright. He is a former press secretary to the President of Angola. In 1986, he was awarded the Sonangol literature prize for his work, Ana. Zd e os escravos, a drama analyzing the roots of the slave trade from an Angola perspective.

Abrantes was born in Northern Malanje, he attended the Faculty of Letters, University of Lisbon where he studied Germanic languages graduating in 1969. Between 1970 and 1974, he was in exile in France. In 1975, he co-founded the Angolan Press Agency and was editor-in-chief from 1975 to 1981.

== Works ==
- Arena conta Zumbi (1964)
- Ana. Zd e os escravos. (staged in 1980 and published in 1988)
- Sequeira. Luis Lopes ou o mulato dos prodiqios. (1993)

== Sources ==
- Wasserman, Bonnie (1999). Metaphors of oppression in modern Lusophone historical drama (Thesis). University of Wisconsin.
