= Hariana Verás =

Angolan journalist and television host (born 1984)

- Born: Hariana Verás Victoria; July 22, 1984 (age 42); Malanje, Angola
- Occupations: Journalist, Television Producer
- Known for: First African journalist accredited to White House, Senate, and Pentagon
- Television: Get To Know Africa

Hariana Verás Victoria (born 22 July 1984, in Malanje, Angola) is an Angolan journalist and television host based in the United States. She is recognized for being the first African journalist accredited to the White House, the U.S. Senate, and the Pentagon.

== Career ==
She began her professional career at the age of 18 with the independent newspaper Folha 8 and later contributed to Angolense, TV Zimbo, and the public broadcaster TPA.

In 2007, Verás moved to the United States to work as a press assistant at the Angolan Embassy in Washington, D.C., a post she held for nine years. In 2012, she launched the television program Get To Know Africa to highlight African culture, leaders, and success stories from a continental perspective.

Since 2018, Verás has been a correspondent for Angola's TPA (Televisão Pública de Angola), covering international political and economic events, including the United Nations General Assembly and World Bank summits.

== White House interaction with Donald Trump ==
On 27 June 2025, Hariana Verás participated in a White House press event during the signing of the Congo-Rwanda peace agreement between the Democratic Republic of the Congo and Rwanda. The event, held in the Oval Office, was attended by U.S. President Donald Trump, Vice President JD Vance, Secretary of State Marco Rubio, and the foreign ministers of both African nations, Thérèse Kayikwamba Wagner and Olivier Nduhungirehe.

As the ceremony began, White House Press Secretary Karoline Leavitt invited Verás, whom she described as a "friend", to address the press and guests. Verás spoke about the significance of the accord and praised Trump's role in facilitating it, referencing her recent time interviewing people on the ground in eastern Congo. "I saw hope. They have hope now for a better day in Congo," she said, adding that President Félix Tshisekedi of the DRC wanted to nominate Trump for a Nobel Peace Prize.

Trump responded:

"So beautifully stated. You are beautiful... and you're beautiful inside. I wish I had more reporters like you. I'm not allowed to say that, you know that could be the end of my political career."

Verás did not publicly comment on the exchange, which went viral online.

== Achievements ==
- In March 2021, Verás received a permanent "Hard Pass" from the White House Press Office, granting her formal press access. She became the first African journalist to obtain this credential.
- Verás is also the first African journalist accredited to the Pentagon, where she reports on defense and security matters on behalf of Angola's national broadcaster.
- She remains the only African journalist accredited to the U.S. Senate.
- In 2021, she received a Certificate of Recognition from the City of Hampton, Virginia, for her contribution to African-American and African community relations.
