= Idalino Manuel Mendes =

Angolan politician

Idalino Manuel Mendes (15 March 1947 — 30 May 2020) was the Angolan politician.

Mendes was born in 1947 in Ícolo e Bengo. He joined MPLA and eventually became the minister for industry in the government of José Eduardo dos Santos. He served as a minister between 1992 and 1996. After that, between 1996 and 2002, he was the governor of Bengo Province. Mendes died in 2020.
