= Simão (Angolan footballer) =

Angolan footballer

Personal information
- Date of birth: July 10, 1976 (age 50)
- Place of birth: Angola
- Position: Midfielder

International career
Years	Team	Apps	(Gls)
2004–2007	Angola	12	(0)

Simão (born July 10, 1976) is an Angolan football player. He has played for Angola national team.

== National team statistics ==
Angola national team
Year	Apps	Goals
2004	4	0
2005	1	0
2006	5	0
2007	2	0
Total	12	0
