= José Patrício =

Angolan ambassador

Ambassador to Georgia for Angola
- Incumbent
- Assumed office 3 September 2021

Ambassador to Turkey for Angola
- Incumbent
- Assumed office 2018

Permanent Representative to the United Nations for Angola
- In office 2000–2001
- Preceded by: Afonso Van-Dúnem M'Binda
- Succeeded by: Gaspar Martins

Ambassador to Portugal for Angola
- In office September 1994 – Late 1999

First Ambassador to the United States for Angola
- In office 1993–1994

Personal details
- Born: 9 March 1954 (age 72) Luanda, Angola
- Education: Independent University of Portugal, Complutense University

José Patrício (born 9 March 1954 in Luanda) is an Angolan politician who served as the ambassador of Angola to the United Nations from 2000 to 2001. He replaced Afonso Van-Dúnem M'Binda and preceded Gaspar Martins.

José Patrício served as an Angolan Ambassador to the United Nations and has previously served as Angolan Ambassador to Portugal and also opened the country's embassy in Washington D.C in 1993. Prior to that, Ambassador Patrício served as Information Secretary in the Office of the President. In 1993 he was named by the World Economic Forum as one of the 200 Leaders of the Future.
