= Maria Haller =

Angolan diplomat, journalist, teacher and writer (1923–2006)

- Born: Maria de Jesus Nunes Da Silva; 1923; Angola
- Died: 18 October 2006 (aged 82–83); Geneva, Switzerland
- Occupations: diplomat, journalist, teacher and writer
- Known for: Angola's first female ambassador, member, Union of Angolan Writers (UEA)
- Notable work: children's story in UEA's Acácia Rubra anthology
- Spouse: Jean Rodolphe de Haller (m. 2026)

Maria de Jesus Haller (1923 – 18 October 2006), was Angola's first female ambassador. She participated in Angola's struggle for independence from its colonial power, Portugal, she was a teacher, a journalist and a writer.

== Biography ==
She was born in Angola as Maria de Jesus Nunes Da Silva in 1923, the daughter of a 12-year-old plantation worker who had been raped by the plantation owner. When Maria was three, her father sent her to be raised in his native Portugal. At 15, she briefly reunited with her mother and became inspired to pursue activism and politics.

Around 1955 she married Swiss businessman Jean Rodolphe de Haller. While living in Léopoldville in colonial Belgian Congo, she met fellow Angolans living in exile who opposed Portugal's oppression of the Black population of Angola. After returning to Europe, Haller stayed in contact with the group and, around 1965, was asked to represent the MPLA (People's Movement for the Liberation of Angola) in Cairo, Egypt. She faced sexism in this role, with Egyptian officials denying her access to radio stations until she and Agostinho Neto threatened to leave Egypt.

After 13 years of war, Angola gained its independence on 11 November 1975, with Agostinho Neto as its first president. In 1978, Haller became Angola's first female ambassador and was sent to Stockholm to represent her country in the Kingdom of Sweden. She later became director of the Asia and Oceania Department in Angola's Ministry of External Relations.

She was a member of the Union of Angolan Writers (UEA) and in 1988 contributed a children's story to the union's Acácia Rubra anthology.

Haller died on 18 October 2006 in Geneva, Switzerland, after a prolonged illness. Her funeral was held in Angola.

== Works ==
- "Fá...pe...lááá!!!". Acácia Rubra. União dos Escritores Angolanos (UEA). 1988. (anthology of children's stories)
