= Susana Mendes =

Angolan journalist

- Born: 1987 (age 38–39); Benguela, Angola
- Education: Universidade Independente de Angola
- Occupation: Journalist
- Years active: 2004–present
- Employers: Angolense; Vida TV
- Known for: Being the first female editor of a major weekly newspaper in Angola

Susana Mendes (born 1987) is an Angolan journalist. At the age of 23, she was appointed editor of the Angolense, making her Angola's first female editor of a major weekly newspaper. In 2020 she joined Vida TV as editorial coordinator of their information department.

Rafael Marques has praised her contributions to Angolan journalism:

Susana is a very courageous journalist and one of the few women who has embraced the fight for the freedom of press in the country, and that is quite remarkable.

== Life ==
Susana Mendes was born in Benguela in western Angola. She attended high school in Luanda, and while there started training at the state-owned Rádio Nacional Angola. At the age of 17, she began working as a reporter at the Luanda-based business newspaper Agora. The job enabled her to pay for her education at Universidade Independente de Angola. Mendes then worked at A Capital, a private anti-corruption weekly.

In 2005 Americo Gonçalves, founder of Angolense as well as A Capital, recruited her to be editor of Angolense.

In 2008 Mendes joined other feminists to create the Forum of Women Journalists for Gender Equality (FMJIG). Members created a series of radio programs in 2009 to promote a draft bill crimininalizing domestic violence. The bill was introduced in 2010, though the legislation lacks penalties and the assembly has not acted on it.

In 2009-10 Mendes was vice president of the Johannesburg-based Africa Investigative Reporters Forum.
