= Wanda Ramos =

Portuguese author and poet

Wanda Ramos (1948–1998) was a Portuguese author and poet.

Ramos was born in Dundo, Angola and moved to Portugal around 1958. In addition to her novels and collections of poems, Ramos also worked as a translator, translating works by Jorge Luis Borges, Edith Wharton, Octavio Paz, Rabindranath Tagore and John le Carré into Portuguese.

== Selected works ==
=== Collections of poems ===
- Nas Coxas do Tempo (1970)
- E Contudo Cantar Sempre (1979)
- Poemas-com-Sentidos (1985)

=== Novels ===
- Percursos (1981), which won the prize for fiction of the Portuguese Writers' Association
- As Incontáveis Vésperas (1983)
- l'éblouissant Litoral (1991)

Her last book was Crónica com estuário ao fundo, (French version Chronique sur fond d’estuaire) published in 1998.
