= Isabel Ferreira =

Angolan writer

Isabel Ferreira (born 24 May 1958, Luanda, Angola) is an Angolan writer. A law graduate, she is known for works such as Laços de Amor (1995), Caminhos Ledos (1997), Nirvana (2004), and Remando Daqui (2005).

== Works ==
- Laços de amor: poemas, Lagos, 1995. OCLC 35303097
- Caminhos Ledos Luanda, Angola: I. Ferreira, 1996. OCLC 51208514
- Nirvana (2004)
- À Margem das Palavras Nuas (2005)
- Remando Daqui (2005)
- O guardador de memórias, Edições KujizaKuami, 2007. ISBN 9789899589407, OCLC 681713371
