= Inês Faria =

Portuguese actress

- Born: Lisbon, Portugal
- Occupation: Actress
- Years active: 2010–present
- Known for: Carolina, A Vida Também é Isto, SIC Radical

Inês Faria (born Maria Inês Coutinho Faria, Lisbon, Portugal) is a Portuguese actress.

== Biography ==
=== Early life ===
Born in Lisbon, Portugal, daughter of a Brazilian born father and a Portuguese mother, Inês showed an early interest in the artistic field. She ended up studying Environmental Engineering at Instituto Superior Técnico in Lisbon, but after obtaining her degree she chose to pursue a career in acting instead. She then left for Los Angeles, USA, where she studied film acting.

=== Career ===
Inês made her first appearance on Portuguese television in the soap opera "Meu Amor", TVI, in 2010. She returned to Portugal, after studying in Los Angeles, and starred as Carolina in the TV series "A Vida Também é Isto", broadcast on SIC Radical channel and in a major commercial for the famous brands Continente and Worten. Inês hosted the International Film Festival, FESTin, in 2013, where she also made her debut as an associate producer of the documentary "Sem Anos de Solidão". In 2014 she returned to Los Angeles in order to continue studying, this time at the Ivana Chubbuck Studio. Went back to Lisbon to host the International Film Festival, FESTin 2014, where she did a tribute to actor José Wilker and share the stage with the actress Regina Duarte. Inês also hosted the closing ceremony of the festival and handed the trophies to the winners. She is one of the Portuguese actresses that got cast in the international feature film, "Streaming", to debut in 2016.

== Personal life ==
Inês speaks three languages fluently: Portuguese, English and Spanish. She is a vegetarian and an activist for animal rights.
