= António Jacinto =

Angolan poet and politician

Secretary of State for Culture of Angola
- In office 1975–1981
- Preceded by: Position established
- Succeeded by: Boaventura Cardoso

Personal details
- Born: António Jacinto do Amaral Martins; 28 September 1924 Luanda, Angola
- Died: 23 June 1991 (aged 66) Lisbon, Portugal
- Party: MPLA
- Known for: Poems, short stories

António Jacinto do Amaral Martins (28 September 1924 – 23 June 1991) was an Angolan poet and politician. He was also known by his pseudonym Orlando Tavora.

== Biography ==
Jacinto was born in Luanda, Angola, to parents of Portuguese descent. He was raised and studied in the interior of Angola in the remote town of Golungo Alto in Cuanza Norte Province. After having obtained his license in Luanda, he started working as a civil servant. He stood out as a protesting poet, and as a result of his political militancy, was first arrested in 1959. Jacinto was ultimately sent to the Tarrafal concentration camp in Cape Verde from 1961 to 1972. His first book of poems was published in 1961, the same year of his arrest and imprisonment. His imprisonment received international attention, and he was transferred in 1972 to Lisbon where, on parole, he worked as an accountant.

Jacinto escaped in 1973 to join the Popular Movement for the Liberation of Angola (MPLA). As soon as independence was declared in 1975 he served in the cabinet of Agostinho Neto (1922 – 1979), first as Minister of Education and Culture, and as secretary of the National Cultural Council in 1977. He withdrew from politics in 1990 due to advanced age.

Jacinto died in Lisbon, Portugal, in 1991.

== Bibliography ==
- Colectãnea de Poemas, 1961, Éditions Casa dos Estudantes do Império, Lisbon.
- Outra vez Vovô Bartolomeu (Portuguese, Another time Grandfather Bartolomeu), 1979.
- Sobreviver em tarrafal de Santiago (Portuguese, 1980), Survivre dans Tarrafal de Santiago (French, "Surviving in Tarrafal de Santiago"), Luanda: Éditions INALD (Instituto Nacional do Livro de Disco), 1985. Winner of 1985 National Literature prize.

== Selected poems ==
- "O grande desafio" (Portuguese; "The great challenge")
- "Poema da alienação" ("Poem of alienation")
- "Carta dum contratado" ("Letter of a contract worker")
- "Monangamba" (French adaptation and music setting by Colette Magny in 1964)
- "Canto interior de uma noite fantástica" ("Interior chant of a fantastic night")
- "Era uma vez (literally, "it was once"; can be translated as, "Once upon a time")
- "Bailarina negra" ("Black dancer")
- "Ah! Se pudésseis aqui ver poesia que não há!" ("Ah! If you could see that there is no poetry here!")

== Quotes ==
- "Sur cette vaste plantation, ce n'est pas la pluie mais la sueur de mon front qui arrose les récoltes" (French, from poem "Monangamba"; literally: "On this vast plantation, it is not rain but the sweat from my brow that waters the harvests").
