= José de Fontes Pereira =

Angolan journalist

- Born: January 1, 1838; Luanda
- Died: May 1, 1891 (aged 53)
- Occupations: Journalist; Writer; Lawyer; Civil servant; Political activist

José de Fontes Pereira (1838 in Luanda – May 1891) was a radical Angolan lawyer-journalist and writer.

== Career ==
Considered an early Angolan nationalist and assimilado, Pereira took advantage of a relatively free press in Angola from 1870-1890 to question Portuguese obligations and control over Angola. He addressed topics such as the export of black Angolans to São Tomé and Príncipean plantations, coerced labor within the colony, inefficiency, corruption and racial discrimination, amongst many others.

Writing for the literate Portuguese settler population of Angola, Pereira wrote mostly in the Portuguese language. Pereira lost his job and was put on trial when, in 1890, he suggested that the British should take over colonial administration of the colony due to Portuguese incompetence. He died 16 months later in May 1891 of natural causes.

== Sources ==
- Eduardo A. Estevam Santos (2020). Imprensa, raça e civilização: José de Fontes Pereira e o pensamento intelectual angolano no século XIX. Afro-Ásia, núm. 61. doi: 10.9771/aa.v0i61.31466 (Open access)
- "Angola Is Whose House?" Early Stirrings of Angolan Nationalism and Protest, 1822-1910 by Douglas L. Wheeler, Journal of African Historical Studies, 1969
- Wheeler, Douglas L. (1970). An early Angolan protest: the radical journalism of José de Fontes Pereira (1823-1891). In Rotberg et al., Protest and power in black Africa (pp.854-874). New York: Oxford University Press.
- Chilcote, Ronald Hodell & California. University, (1972). The journalism of José de Fontes Pereira (1823-1891). In Protest and resistance in Angola and Brazil : comparative studies (pp. 76-78). Berkeley[, Calif. etc.]: University of California Press.
