= Ernesto Lara Filho =

- Born: Ernesto Pires Barreto de Lara Filho; 2 November 1932; Benguela, Portuguese Angola
- Died: 7 February 1977 (aged 44); Huambo, Angola
- Occupations: writer, civil servant

Ernesto Pires Barreto de Lara Filho (1932–1977) was a revolutionary Portuguese Angolan writer and agronomist and brother of Angolan poet Alda Lara.

Born in Benguela in 1932, he was educated in Angola and Portugal before he began work as a journalist in Luanda in the 1950s. An outspoken supporter of Angolan independence, he was arrested by the Portuguese security agency PIDE for his revolutionary activities.

In his life Ernesto Lara Filho published several notable books and anthologies of poetry. He was also one of the founders of the Association of Angolan Writers after independence. He died in an automobile accident in 1977, at age 44.

== See also ==
- Portuguese Angolans
- Alda Lara
