= Alberto Graves Chakussanga =

Angolan journalist (1978–2010)

- Born: c. 1978
- Died: 5 September 2010; Viana suburb, Luanda, Angola
- Occupations: Radio host of weekly current affairs, Radio Despertar

Alberto Graves Chakussanga (c. 1978 – 5 September 2010), was an Angolan journalist. Chakussanga worked as a weekly current affairs program radio host for the Radio Despertar in the Viana district outside of Luanda when he was murdered in his home. A vocal critic of the government, Chakussanga's murder remains unsolved. According to the Committee to Protect Journalists's database, Chakussanga and Stanislas Ocloo, also killed in 2010, were the first journalists killed in Angola since Simao Roberto, also a government critic, was killed in 1998.

== Death ==
Alberto Graves Chakussanga was murdered in his home in the Luanda district of Viana on 5 September 2010. He was found by his sister-in-law in his kitchen with a bullet wound to the back. Chakussangra had been receiving threats just before his murder. All that appeared to be missing was a tank of cooking gas, while money, his car, a cell phone, and other personal items were left behind.

== Context ==
Murder of Alberto Graves Chakussanga
- Location: Luanda, Angola
- Date: 5 September 2010
- Deaths: 1

At the time of his death, Chakussanga, presented weekly news on his Umbundu-language call-in show that was highly critical of the government, which is headed by the Popular Movement for the Liberation of Angola (MPLA). Chakussanga had a close relationship with those in his community, particularly the Southern Mbundu, known as the Ovimbundu, one of Angola's largest ethnic groups, made up largely of rebels. Radio Despertar, the station Chakussanga reported for, was being accused of continuously encouraging the community to cause civil disobedience in retaliation to the government, which the station adamantly refused doing. The station was created after "peace accords" between the MPLA, which is the ruling group, and UNITA when it ended its armed rebellion. According to the CPJ, the station was affiliated with the latter, or the National Union for the Total Independence of Angola. Chakussanga spoke out against the government during this turbulent time. In January 2010, he began segments that contained discussions about political education for the people of Angola. According to friends and acquaintances, Chakussanga received threatening phone calls and text message in the months before his death.

== Impact ==
Chakussanga's death was a violent act that affected his audience, as well as other media outlets in southern Africa. His show criticized the MPLA in Angola. According to Media Institute for Southern Africa, his death was an indication of all those against media freedom and who wish to silence objecting opinions.

== Reactions ==
Irina Bokova, the director-general of UNESCO, condemned the deaths of four journalists from the previous week on 11 September 2010, which included Alberto Chakussanga. She said how important political journalism is and that "The work of media professionals is vital for the fundamental right of freedom of expression."

Reporters Without Borders reported that there was a likely link between Chakussanga's death and the actions of the radio station. It called for justice to be brought about quickly due to the importance of media freedom in the area. This organization wrote a letter to Angolan interior minister Sebastiao Martins (Sebastiao José Antonio Martins), expressing concerns over the string of killings of journalists. "We are concerned by the fact that the victims all work for critical or opposition news media," secretary-general Jean-François Julliard voiced in the letter sent in late October. The letter also urged that there be no impunity for the crimes. The letter also addressed the cases of detained journalist Rafael Marques and injured journalists Antonio Manuel Da Silva, also of Radio Despertar, and Norberto Abias Sateko, of TV Zimbo.

In Africa particularly, Chakussanga's death has incited an uproar by the people to have his assassin(s) brought to justice. Many feel his death must be a reminder of the importance of media freedom in countries controlled by the government.

== Career ==
Alberto Graves Chakussanga was best known as a radio show host critical of the ruling MPLA government in Angola.

He was also a lecturer at the Faculty of Arts and Sciences at the Agostinho Neto state university, as well as at the Angolan police academy.

== Personal ==
Chakussanga was married and the father of four children, the youngest of whom was born on the same day Chakussanga was murdered on September 5, 2010.
