= Alcides Sakala Simões =

Angolan politician

Alcides Sakala Simões (born 23 December 1953) is an Angolan politician for UNITA and a member of the National Assembly of Angola.

== Publications ==
- Memórias de um Guerrilheiro
