= Alda Lara =

Angolan poet

- Born: Alda Ferreira Pires Barreto de Lara Albuquerque; 9 June 1930; Benguela, Portuguese Angola
- Died: 30 January 1962 (aged 31); Cambambe, Portuguese Angola
- Citizenship: Portuguese
- Occupations: Medical doctor, poet, journalist
- Spouse: Orlando Albuquerque (writer)
- Writing career
- Notable work: Tempo de chuva

Alda Ferreira Pires Barreto de Lara Albuquerque, known as Alda Lara (9 June 1930, Benguela, Angola – 30 January 1962, Cambambe, Angola) was a Portuguese-language Angolan poet.

== Early life and education ==
Alda Lara was born on 9 June 1930 in Benguela, Portuguese Angola. She came from a wealthy family and received a Christian education, which gave her a spirit of liberalism according to one commentator. Her brother was the noted poet Ernesto Lara Filho. Lara attended a women's school in Sá da Bandeira (now Lubango) before moving to Portugal to finish her secondary schooling. She attended University of Lisbon and resided at the Casa dos Estudantes do Império (House of the Students of the Empire). She had an active student life and began her writing career by publishing poetry in the literary journal Mensagem, a publication specifically for Africans. Lara later attended the University of Coimbra and earned a degree in medicine.

== Career ==
Lara wrote for several newspapers and magazines such as the Jornal de Benguela, the Jornal de Angola, and the ABC e Ciência. She married the Mozambican-Portuguese writer Orlando Albuquerque and gave birth to four children. After living in Portugal for 13 years, Lara moved back to Angola in 1961.

== Death and legacy ==
She died on 30 January 1962 in Cambambe.

Her husband set about publishing her collected works after her death, including Poemas in 1966 and Tempo de Chuva in 1973. Lara's poems and short stories mostly deal with themes of motherhood and children as well as liberty and justice. Much of her poetry reflect a dissatisfaction with the colonial status quo.

The Alda Lara Prize (in Portuguese, Prémio Alda Lara) was established in her honour by the city of Lubango. Paulo de Carvalho, a famed Portuguese singer, who has had a strong artistic career, recorded "Preludio/Mãe Negra", a poem written by Alda Lara. Movimento, the second album of Aline Frazão released in 2013, features a poem by Lara set to music.

== Books (posthumous) ==
- Poemas (1966)
- Tempo da Chuva (1973)
- Poesia (1979)
- Poemas (1984) (her collected poems)
