= Ana de Santana =

Angolan writer

Ana Paula de Jesus Faria Santana, known as Ana de Santana or Ana Koluki (born 20 October 1960), is an Angolan writer.

== Biography ==
Santana was born in Gabela, Kwanza Sul province, but grew up in Luanda, Angola. She is a graduate of Economics for Business (BA Hon.) by the University of Westminster and a Master of Science (MSc Merit) in Economic History and Development Economics by the London School of Economics and Political Science (LSE). In 1986 she published the poetry collection Sabores, Odores e Sonho ("Flavors, Scents and Reveries"). Blending the heritages of Angola and Africa, political failings and civil strife, her work describes the fragmentation experienced in everyday life. The poems contains broken phrases which describe the persistence of impossibilities and frustrated desires.

Professor Oyekan Owomoyela believed that Santana and Ana Paula Tavares (born 1952) were of "particular interest and importance" among Angola's poets of the 1980s, a genre which has typically been dominated by male writers. According to Luís Kandjimbo, Santana belongs to a group of contemporary female writers in Angola, whom he refers to as the "Generation of Uncertainties" ("Geração das Incertezas"), writers who typically display anguish and melancholy in their works, expressing disappointment with the political and social conditions in the country; the “Generation of Uncertainties”, which also included João Maimona, José Eduardo Agualusa, Lopito Feijoó, and João de Melo, represents Angola's 1980s' poetic movement. She is also a contemporary of the poet Maria Alexandre Dáskalos (born 1957). Santana, Dáskalos, and Tavares are noted for "exploring issues related to erotic desire and heterosexuality".
