= Henrique Abranches =

Angolan writer and anthropologist

- Born: September 29, 1932
- Died: August 8, 2004 (aged 71)
- Occupation: Writer
- Writing career
- Language: Portuguese
- Notable work: Konkhava de Féti

Henrique (or Enrique) Abranches (September 29, 1932 – August 8, 2004) was an Angolan writer and anthropologist born in Lisbon, Portugal.

== Career ==
In 1975, he went to Angola, where he acquired citizenship.

With Pepetela, he founded in Algiers the Angolan Studies Center, where they worked on writing a handbook about the history of Angola. After independence, he was committed to cultural intervention. He was a teacher in higher education, besides being a poet, fiction writer, essayist and playwright.

He was also the Director of the National Museum of Slavery, Angola.

== Awards ==
- National Literature Award (1981) for Konkhava de Féti.
- National Literature Award (1990) for O Clã de Novembrino
- Luanda trophy (1997)
