= Ribeira Brava, Cape Verde (municipality) =

Municipality of Cape Verde

Ribeira Brava
- Municipality
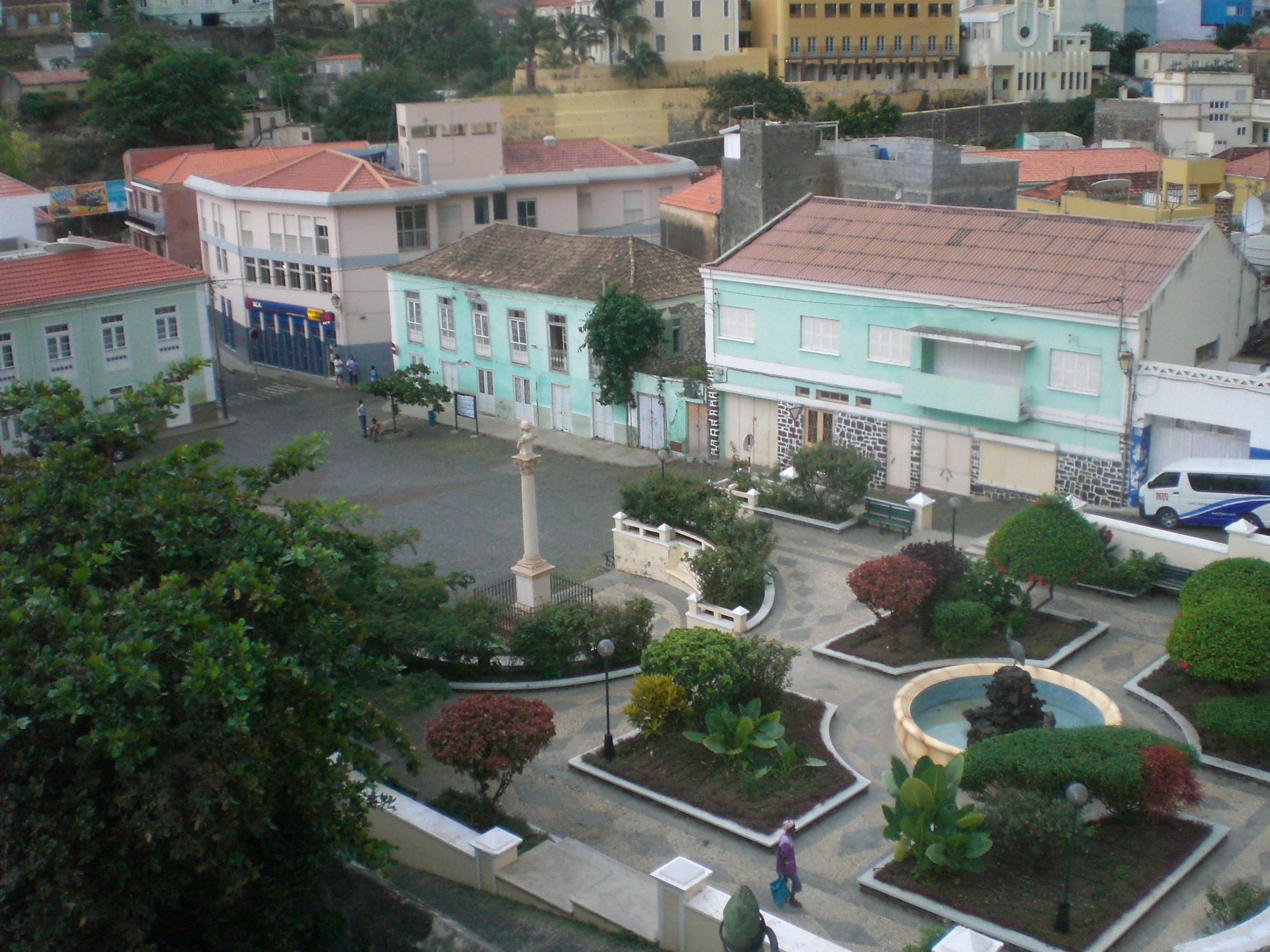
- Main square in Ribeira Brava

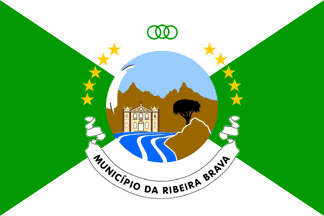
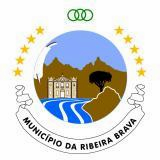
- Flag Seal

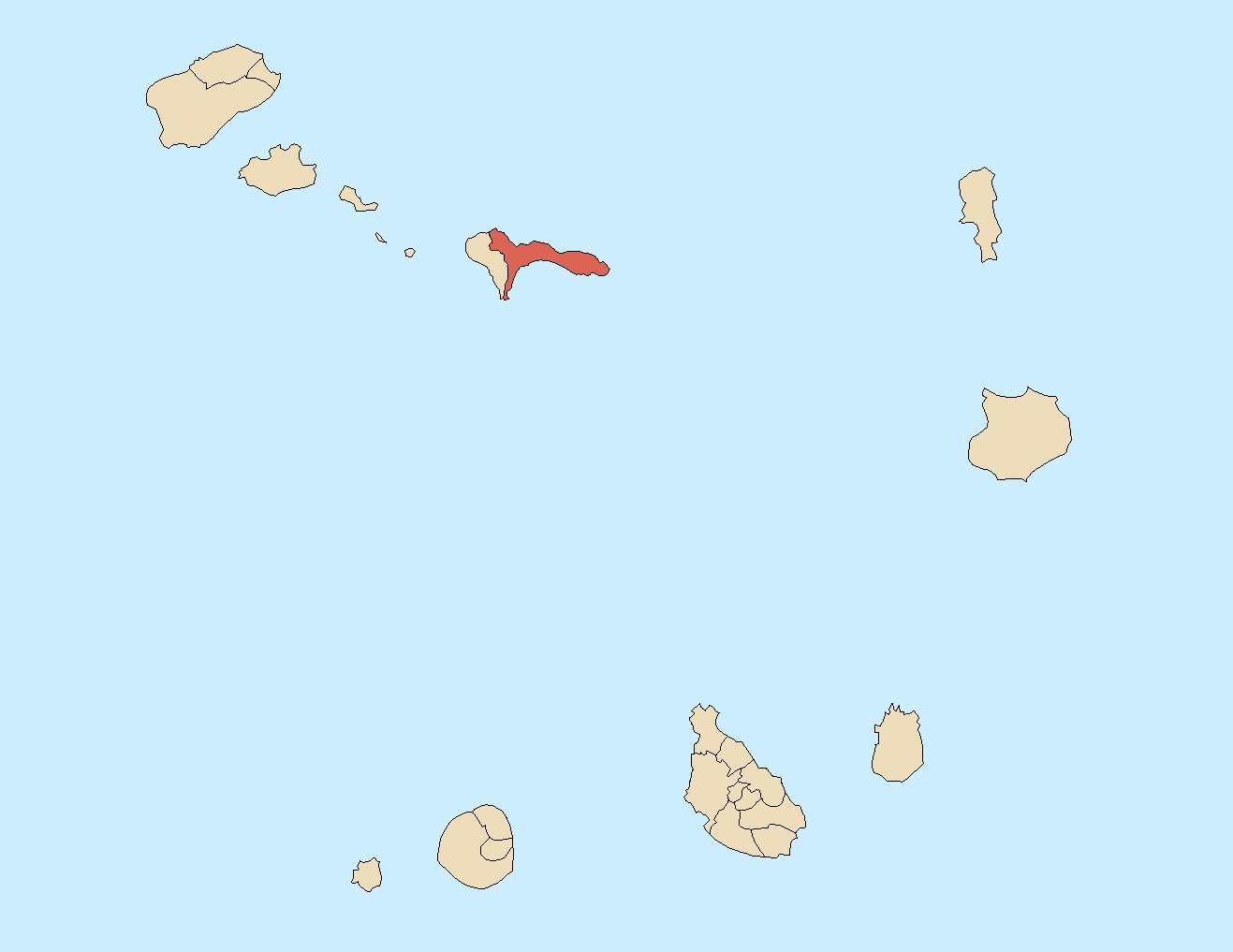
- Coordinates: 16.62°N 24.23°W
- Country: Cape Verde
- Island: São Nicolau
- Seat: Ribeira Brava

Area
  - Total: 224.8 km^{2} (86.8 sq mi)

Population (2010)
  - Total: 7,580
  - Density: 33.7/km^{2} (87.3/sq mi)
- ID: 31
- Website: http://www.cmrb.cv/

Ribeira Brava is a concelho (municipality) of Cape Verde. Situated in the eastern part of the island of São Nicolau, it covers 65% of the island area (224.8 km^{2}), and is home to 59% of its population (7,580 at the 2010 census). Its seat is the city Ribeira Brava.

== Subdivisions ==
The municipality consists of two freguesias (civil parishes):

- Nossa Senhora da Lapa
- Nossa Senhora do Rosário

== History ==
The municipality was created in 2005, when the older municipality of São Nicolau was split in two, the southwestern part becoming the Municipality of Tarrafal de São Nicolau and the northeastern part becoming the Municipality of Ribeira Brava.

== Demography ==
Population of Ribeira Brava (1980—2010)
Year	Population
1980	11,465
1990	11,556
2000	11,794
2010	7,580

== Politics ==
Since 2016, the local party GIRB is the ruling party of the municipality. The results of the latest elections, in 2016:

Party	Municipal Council		Municipal Assembly	
Party	Votes%	Seats	Votes%	Seats
GIRB	32.70	2	31.67	4
MpD	32.50	2	33.32	5
PAICV	29.95	1	30.11	4

== Persons ==
- Amílcar Spencer Lopes (b. 1948), president of the National Assembly between 1991 and 1996
- João Lopes Filho (b. 1950), anthropologist and linguist
