= Ana Paula Ribeiro Tavares =

Angolan poet

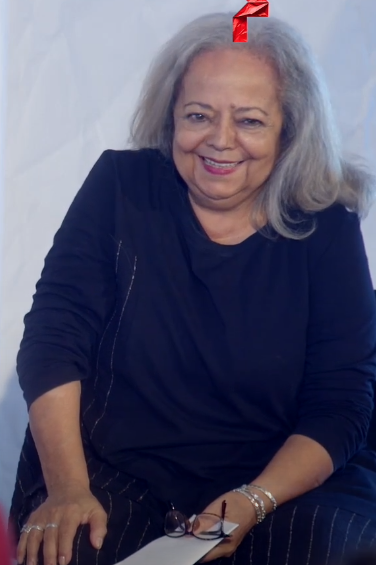
- Tavares in 2024
- Born: 30 October 1952 (age 73); Lubango, Huíla Province, Angola
- Occupation: Poet
- Employer: Catholic University
- Awards: Camões Prize, 2025

Ana Paula Ribeiro Tavares (born 30 October 1952, Lubango, Huíla Province, Angola) is an Angolan poet.

Tavares began her undergraduate degree in history at the University of Lubango Institute of Sciences and Education (ISCED), before moving to Lisbon where, in 1996, she completed a Master's degree in African Literature. Currently living in Portugal, she is a PhD candidate in literature and teaches at the Catholic University of Lisbon.

From 1988 to 1990, Tavares was a member of the Board for the National Award for Literature in Angola, and was also head of the Research Office of the National Center for Documentation and Historical Research in Luanda from 1983 to 1985. She is also a member of several cultural organizations, including the Committee of the Angolan International Council of Museums (ICOM), the Committee of the Angolan International Council on Monuments and Sites (ICOMOS), and the Committee on Angola for UNESCO. Her poetry and prose have been published in anthologies in Portugal, Brazil, France, Germany, Spain and Sweden.

In 2025, she was awarded the Camões Prize.

== Works ==
- Ritos de Passagem (1985)
- O Sangue da Buganvília (1998)
- O Lago da Lua (1999)
- Dizes-me coisas amargas como os frutos (2001)
- A cabeça de Salomé (2004)
- Os olhos do homem que chorava no rio (with Manuel Jorge Marmelo) (2005)
- Manual para amantes desesperados (2007)
