= List of Portuguese-language poets =

The following is a list of famous or notable Portuguese language poets:

== Angola ==
- Agostinho Neto
- Alda Lara
- António Jacinto
- Ondjaki
- Pepetela
- Viriato da Cruz
- Tomaz Vieira da Cruz

== Brazil ==
- Adalgisa Nery
- Adélia Prado
- Alberto de Oliveira
- Alice Sant'Anna
- Alphonsus de Guimaraens
- Alvarenga Peixoto
- Álvares de Azevedo
- Ana Cristina César
- Ana Estaregui
- Ana Martins Marques
- Angélica Freitas
- Antônio Gonçalves Dias
- António Vieira
- Arnaldo Antunes
- Augusto de Lima
- Augusto dos Anjos
- Bernardo Guimarães
- Bruna Beber
- Carlos Drummond de Andrade
- Casimiro de Abreu
- Castro Alves
- Cazuza
- Cecília Meireles
- Cláudio Manuel da Costa
- Clarice Lispector
- Cora Coralina
- Cruz e Sousa
- Cyro dos Anjos
- Dante Milano
- Fabiano Calixto
- Fabrício Carpi Nejar
- Fabrício Corsaletti
- Ferreira Gullar
- Gilberto Mendonça Teles
- Gregório "Boca do Inferno" de Matos Guerra
- Gonçalves Dias
- Haroldo de Campos
- Henriqueta Lisboa
- Hilda Hilst
- Hilda Machado
- Ismar Tirelli Neto
- João Cabral de Melo Neto
- Joaquim Maria Machado de Assis
- José de Alencar
- Jorge de Lima
- José de Mesquita
- José de Santa Rita Durão
- Julia de Souza
- Junqueira Freire
- Laura Liuzzi
- Ledusha Spinardi
- Leonardo Gandolfi
- Mário de Andrade
- Manuel Bandeira
- Manuel de Abreu
- Marília Garcia
- Mário de Andrade
- Menotti del Picchia
- Murilo Mendes
- Olavo Bilac
- Oswald de Andrade
- Paulo Leminski
- Pedro Kilkerry
- Raimundo Correia
- Ricardo Domeneck
- Rodrigo Lobo Damasceno
- Santa Rita Durão
- Tarso de Melo
- Tomás Antônio Gonzaga
- Victor Heringer
- Vinicius de Moraes

== Cape Verde ==
- Aguinaldo Fonseca
- Arménio Vieira
- Jorge Barbosa
- Osvaldo Alcântara
- Ovídio Martins

== East Timor ==
- Fernando Sylvan
- Francisco Borja da Costa

== Galicia (Spain) ==
- Eduardo Blanco Amor
- Xohán de Cangas
- Luisa Castro
- Rosalía de Castro
- Martín Codax
- Álvaro Cunqueiro
- Manuel Curros Enríquez
- Celso Emilio Ferreiro
- Airas Nunes
- Eduardo Pondal
- Eladio Rodríguez
- Claudio Rodríguez Fer
- Ramón Sampedro

== Goa (India) ==
- Adeodato Barreto
- Laxmanrao Sardessai
- Vimala Devi
- R. V. Pandit

== Guinea-Bissau ==
- Abdulai Silá
- Vasco Cabral

== Macau (China) ==
- José dos Santos Ferreira (Adé)

== Mozambique ==
- Armando Guebuza
- Eduardo Mondlane
- Eduardo White
- José Craveirinha
- Luís Bernardo Honwana
- Marcelino dos Santos
- Mia Couto
- Noémia de Sousa
- Sebastião Alba
- Teodomiro Leite de Vasconcelos
- Ungulani Ba Ka Khosa

== Portugal ==
- Al Berto
- Alberto de Lacerda
- Alexandre O'Neill
- Almada Negreiros
- Almeida Garrett
- Antero de Quental
- António Diniz da Cruz e Silva
- António Duarte Gomes Leal
- António Ferreira (poet)
- António Gedeão
- António Nobre
- António Reis
- Aurelino Costa
- Ary dos Santos
- Augusto Gil
- Bernardim Ribeiro
- Caetano da Costa Alegre
- Camilo Pessanha
- Carlos de Oliveira
- Cesário Verde
- Christovão Falcão
- David Mourão-Ferreira
- King Denis of Portugal
- Eugénio de Andrade
- Fernando Pessoa
- Fiama Hasse Pais Brandão
- Florbela Espanca
- Francisco Manoel de Nascimento, aka Filinto Elysio
- Francisco Rodrigues Lobo
- Francisco de Sá de Miranda (1481–1558)
- Garcia de Resende
- Gil Vicente
- Guerra Junqueiro
- Hélia Correia
- Herberto Helder
- Ibn Bassam
- Jerónimo Corte-Real
- João de Deus
- João-Maria Nabais
- Jorge de Sena
- José Agostinho de Macedo
- José António Camões
- José Carlos Ary dos Santos
- José dos Santos Ferreira
- José Gomes Ferreira
- José Régio
- José Saramago
- Judah Leon Abravanel
- Luís de Camões
- Luís Soares Eusébio
- Manuel Alegre
- Manuel António Pina
- Manuel da Fonseca
- Manuel de Faria e Sousa
- Manuel Maria Barbosa du Bocage
- Maria Amália Vaz de Carvalho (1847–1921)
- Maria Teresa Horta
- Mário Cesariny de Vasconcelos
- Mário de Sá-Carneiro
- Matilde Campilho
- Miguel Torga
- Natália Correia
- Orlando da Costa
- Pedro Correia Garção
- Raul de Carvalho
- Rui Knopfli
- Ruy Belo
- Sérgio Godinho
- Sophia de Mello Breyner Andresen
- Vasco da Gama Rodrigues
- Vasco Graça Moura
- Vitorino Nemésio
- Zeca Afonso

== São Tomé and Príncipe ==
- Alda do Espírito Santo
- Caetano da Costa Alegre

== See also ==
- Portuguese language literature
- Portuguese literature
- Portuguese poetry
- Literature of Brazil
- List of Portuguese people
- List of poets
- Instituto Camões
