= List of Portuguese-language authors =

This is a list of Portuguese language authors, by country and then alphabetically.

== Angola ==
- Agostinho Neto
- Ana Paula Tavares
- José Eduardo Agualusa
- José de Fontes Pereira
- Kardo Bestilo
- Ondjaki
- Pepetela
- Sousa Jamba
- Uanhenga Xitu ou Mendes de Carvalho
- Viriato da Cruz

== Brazil ==
=== A ===
- Adélia Prado
- Adolfo Caminha
- Adriana Falcão
- Adriana Lisboa
- Afonso Arinos
- Affonso Romano de Sant'Anna
- Alberto de Oliveira
- Alcântara Machado
- Alphonsus de Guimarães
- Aluísio Azevedo
- Alvarenga Peixoto
- Álvares de Azevedo
- Ana Cristina César
- Ana Maria Machado
- Ângela Lago
- Aníbal Machado
- Antônio Callado
- Antonio Candido
- Antônio de Castro Alves
- Araripe Júnior
- Artur Azevedo
- Arnaldo Antunes
- Augusto de Campos
- Augusto dos Anjos
- Autran Dourado
- Ariano Suassuna

=== B ===
- Ștefan Baciu
- Basílio da Gama
- Beatriz Francisca de Assis Brandão
- Bento Teixeira
- Bruna Lombardi

=== C ===
- Caetano Veloso
- Caio Fernando Abreu
- Capistrano de Abreu
- Carlos Drummond de Andrade
- Carlos Heitor Cony
- Casimiro de Abreu
- Cassiano Ricardo
- Cecília Meireles
- Chico Buarque
- Chico César
- Clarice Lispector
- Cristovão Tezza
- Cruz e Sousa

=== D ===
- Dalton Trevisan
- Dias Gomes
- Darcy Ribeiro
- Décio Pignatari
- Drauzio Varella

=== E ===
- Elisa Lucinda
- Érico Veríssimo
- Euclides da Cunha

=== F ===
- Fagundes Varela
- Fernando Sabino
- Fernando Gabeira
- Ferreira Gullar
- Ferréz
- Flávio Carneiro

=== G ===
- Gilberto Freyre
- Gilka Machado
- Gonçalves de Magalhães
- Gonçalves Dias
- Graciliano Ramos
- Graça Aranha
- Gregório Duvivier
- Gregório de Matos Guerra
- Gustavo Barroso

=== H ===
- Hilda Hilst
- Huberto Rohden

=== I ===
- Ignácio de Loyola Brandão

=== J ===
- João do Rio
- João Cabral de Melo Neto
- João Gilberto Noll
- João Guimarães Rosa
- João Simões Lopes Neto
- João Ubaldo Ribeiro
- Joaquim de Sousa Andrade
- Jorge Amado
- José de Alencar
- José J. Veiga
- José Lins do Rego
- Julio Cézar Ribeiro Vaughan
- Jô Soares

=== L ===
- Leo Vaz
- Lima Barreto
- Lúcia Benedetti
- Luis Fernando Verissimo
- Luiz Ruffato
- Lygia Fagundes Telles

=== M ===
- Maciel Monteiro
- Machado de Assis
- Manuel Bandeira
- Márcio Souza
- Maria José Dupré
- Mário de Andrade
- Mário Quintana
- Max Moreno
- Menotti del Picchia
- Miguel M. Abrahão
- Millôr Fernandes
- Mino Carta
- Moacyr Scliar
- Murilo Mendes
- Murilo Rubião

=== N ===
- Nelson Rodrigues
- Nina Rodrigues

=== O ===
- Otto Lara Resende
- Otto Maria Carpeaux
- Oswald de Andrade

=== P ===
- Paulo Aquarone
- Paulo Coelho
- Paulo Freire
- Paulo Leminski
- Paulo Lins
- Paulo Mendes Campos
- Pedro Nava

=== Q ===
- Qorpo Santo

=== R ===
- Rachel de Queiroz
- Raduan Nassar
- Raphael Montes
- Raul Bopp
- Raul Pompéia
- Regina Rheda
- Roberto Drummond
- Rodolfo Teófilo
- Ryoki Inoue
- Rubem Alves
- Rubem Braga
- Rubem Fonseca
- Rui Barbosa
- Ruth Rocha

=== S ===
- Santiago Nazarian
- Sérgio Buarque de Hollanda
- Sérgio Sant'Anna
- Sílvio Romero
- Sousândrade

=== T ===
- Tânia Martins

=== V ===
- Vinicius de Moraes

=== Z ===
- Zélia Gattai

== Cape Verde ==
- Amílcar Cabral
- Germano Almeida
- Jorge Barbosa
- Onésimo Silveira
- Orlanda Amarílis
- Viriato de Barros (1932–2018)

== Galicia ==
- Ricardo Carvalho Calero
- Rosalia de Castro
- Curros Henriques
- Ricardo Flores Peres
- Eduardo Pondal

== Guinea-Bissau ==
- Abdulai Silá
- Amílcar Cabral
- Vasco Cabral

== Mozambique ==
- Carlos Cardoso
- Eduardo White
- João Paulo Borges Coelho
- José Craveirinha
- Lília Momplé
- Lina Magaia
- Luís Bernardo Honwana
- Luís Carlos Patraquim
- Marcelino dos Santos
- Mia Couto
- Noémia de Sousa
- Orlando Mendes (1916–1990), novelist.
- Paulina Chiziane
- Rui Knopfli
- Ungulani Ba Ka Khosa

== Portugal ==
=== A ===
- Abel Botelho
- Al Berto
- Alexandre Herculano
- Alexandre Maria Pinheiro Torres
- Almada Negreiros
- Almeida Garrett
- Alves Redol
- Antero de Quental
- António Botto
- António Feliciano de Castilho
- António Gomes Leal
- António Gonçalves de Bandarra
- António Lobo Antunes
- António Nobre
- António Vicente Campinas
- António Vieira

=== B ===
- Fernanda Botelho

=== C ===
- Camilo Castelo Branco
- Christovão Falcão

=== E ===
- Eça de Queiroz (José Maria)

=== F ===
- Fernando Monteiro de Castro Soromenho
- Fernando Pessoa
- Fernão Lopes
- Ferreira de Castro
- Francisco Adolfo Coelho
- Francisco Gomes de Amorim

=== G ===
- Garcia de Resende
- Gil Vicente

=== J ===
- João de Barros
- João-Maria Nabais
- José Rodrigues Miguéis
- José Saramago

=== L ===
- Luiz Francisco Rebello
- Luís Vaz de Camões
- Luiz Pacheco

=== M ===
- Manuel Alegre
- Manuel António Pina
- Manuel da Fonseca
- Manuel Maria Barbosa du Bocage
- Manuel Teixeira Gomes
- Maria Amália Vaz de Carvalho
- Maria Judite de Carvalho
- Maria Velho da Costa
- Mário de Sá-Carneiro
- Matilde Rosa Araújo (1921–2010)
- Miguel Sousa Tavares

=== N ===
- Natália Correia

=== R ===
- Ramalho Ortigão
- Raul Brandão

=== S ===
- Soeiro Pereira Gomes
- Ana Eduarda Santos

=== T ===
- Teixeira de Pascoaes

=== U ===
- Urbano Tavares Rodrigues

=== V ===
- Vergílio Ferreira

== São Tomé and Príncipe ==
- Conceição Lima

== East Timor ==
- Luís Cardoso
