= Eugénio de Andrade =

Portuguese poet

Eugénio de Andrade GOSE GCM
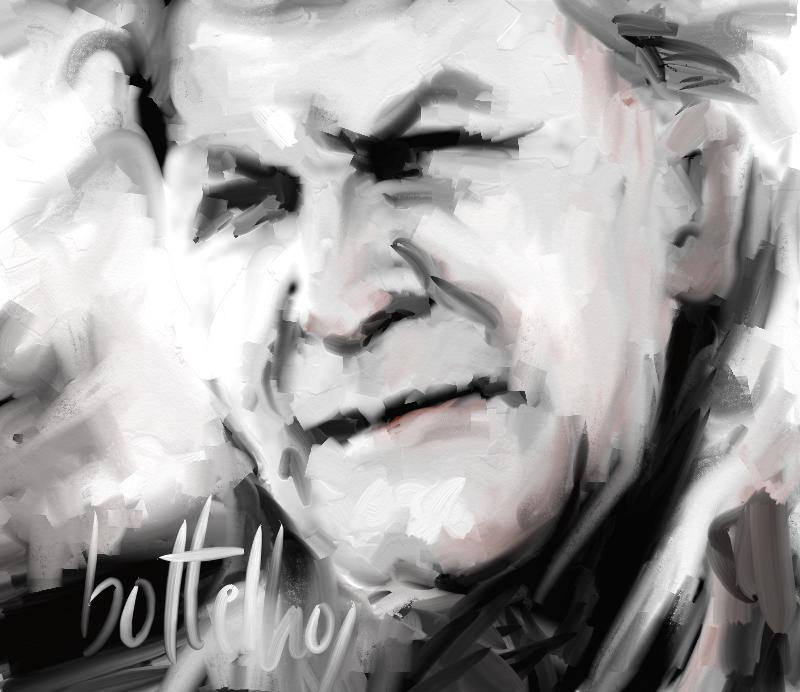
- Portrait of Eugénio de Andrade (2010)
- Born: José Fontinhas; 19 January 1923. Póvoa de Atalaia, Fundão
- Died: 13 June 2005 (aged 82); Porto, Portugal
- Citizenship: Portuguese
- Education: Liceu Passos Manuel; Escola Técnica Machado de Castro
- Occupation: Poet
- Writing career
- Pen name: Eugénio de Andrade
- Language: Portuguese
- Period: 1936-2005
- Genre: Lyricism
- Notable awards: Camões Prize
- Website: Fundação Eugénio de Andrade

Eugénio de Andrade GOSE GCM (born José Fontinhas; 19 January 1923 – 13 June 2005) (Note: His birth certificate date reads 1 February 1923, however, every biographic book and the Eugénio de Andrade Foundation state 19 January 1923) was a Portuguese poet. He is revered as one of the leading names in contemporary Portuguese poetry. He won the Camões Prize in 2001.

== Early years ==
Eugénio de Andrade was born in Póvoa de Atalaia, Concelho do Fundão, Beira Baixa, on 19 January 1923. After his parents' marriage broke apart, he moved to Lisbon in 1933 and attended the Lyceum Passos Manuel and the Escola Técnica Machado de Castro where he wrote his first poems three years later. In 1938, he sent some of those poems to António Botto who encouraged him to keep writing, so much that he had his first book Narciso published in 1939 under his real name which would be dropped sometime later.

== Career ==
In 1943, Eugénio de Andrade moved to Coimbra and then to Tavira the following year, cities where he did the military service finished back in Coimbra in 1944. The same year he strengthened his friendship with Afonso Duarte, Eduardo Lourenço, Joaquim Namorado, Carlos de Oliveira, and Miguel Torga, friends he made during his time in the army. Having worked as administrative inspector for the Ministry of Health from 1947, a position held for 35 years, he finally settled in Porto in 1950 where he lived for more than four decades until he moved to the building of the former Eugénio de Andrade Foundation in Foz do Douro.

During the years that followed, the poet traveled extensively, having been invited to take part in various events where befriended many personalities of Portuguese and foreign culture such as Sophia de Mello Breyner Andresen, José Luis Cano, Luis Cernuda, Mário Cesariny, Ángel Crespo, Herberto Helder, João Miguel Fernandes Jorge, Óscar Lopes, Agustina Bessa Luís, Joaquim Manuel Magalhães, Jaime Montestrela, Vitorino Nemésio, Teixeira de Pascoaes, Jorge de Sena, Joel Serrão, Ângelo de Sousa, Marguerite Yourcenar, and many others. Despite his national and international prestige he always lived apart from the so-called social, literary or bohemian life, having himself justified his rare public appearances due to "this weakness of the heart called friendship".

== Awards ==
Eugénio de Andrade received numerous awards including the Prize of the Associação Portuguesa de Escritores (1986), Prize D. Dinis from Casa de Mateus Foundation (1988), the Great Poetry Prize of the Portuguese Association of Writers (1989) and the Camões Prize (2001). On 8 July 1982, he was made Grande Official da Ordem Militar de Sant'Iago da Espada, having been awarded also with the Grã-Cruz da Ordem do Mérito on 4 February 1989. He died in Porto on 13 June 2005 after prolonged neurological disease.

== Literary works ==
Eugénio de Andrade debuted with Narciso (1939), and became a better-known personality in the literary field with his book of verses Adolescente (1942). His well-deserved recognition came with the publication of As Mãos e os Frutos in 1948, which earned him critical acclaim from Jorge de Sena and Vitorino Nemésio. During the 1940s he took part in the World Literature Seminar (1946-1948). His essentially lyrical body of work was considered by José Saramago as one reached through continuous debugging.

Among dozens of published works are Os amantes Sem Dinheiro (1950), As Palavras Interditas (1951), Escrita da Terra (1974), Matéria Solar (1980), Rente ao Dizer (1992), Ofício da Paciência (1994), O Sal da Língua (1995), and Os Lugares do Lume (1998). In prose he published Os afluentes do Silêncio (1968), Rosto Precário (1979) and À Sombra da Memória (1993), as well as children's stories História da Égua Branca (1977) and Aquela Nuvem e as Outras (1986). His work Os Sulcos da Sede was awarded the Poetry Prize of the Pen Clube Português in September 2003.

Eugénio de Andrade was also translator of works by Federico García Lorca, Antonio Buero Vallejo, the classical Greek poet Sappho (Poemas e Fragmentos in 1974), and also of works by Yannis Ritsos, René Char, and Jorge Luis Borges.

== Translations ==
- Inhabited Heart: The Select Poems of Eugénio de Andrade. Trans. of Alexis Levitin, Van Nuys, California: Perivale Press, 1985.
- White on White. Trans. of Alexis Levitin, in “Quarterly Review of Literature”, Princeton, New Jersey.
- Memory of Another River. Trans. of Alexis Levitin, St. Paul, Minnesota: New Rivers Press, 1988.
- The Slopes of a Gaze. Trans. of Alexis Levitin, Plattsburgh, New York: Apalachee Press, 1992.
- Dark Domain. Trans. of Alexis Levitin, Toronto: Guernica, 2000.
- Forbidden Words: Selected poetry of Eugenio de Andrade. Trans. of Alexis Levitin, New York, NY: New Directions Publishing, 2003.
