= Cruzeiro Seixas =

Portuguese artist and poet (1920–2020)

Artur Manuel do Cruzeiro Seixas
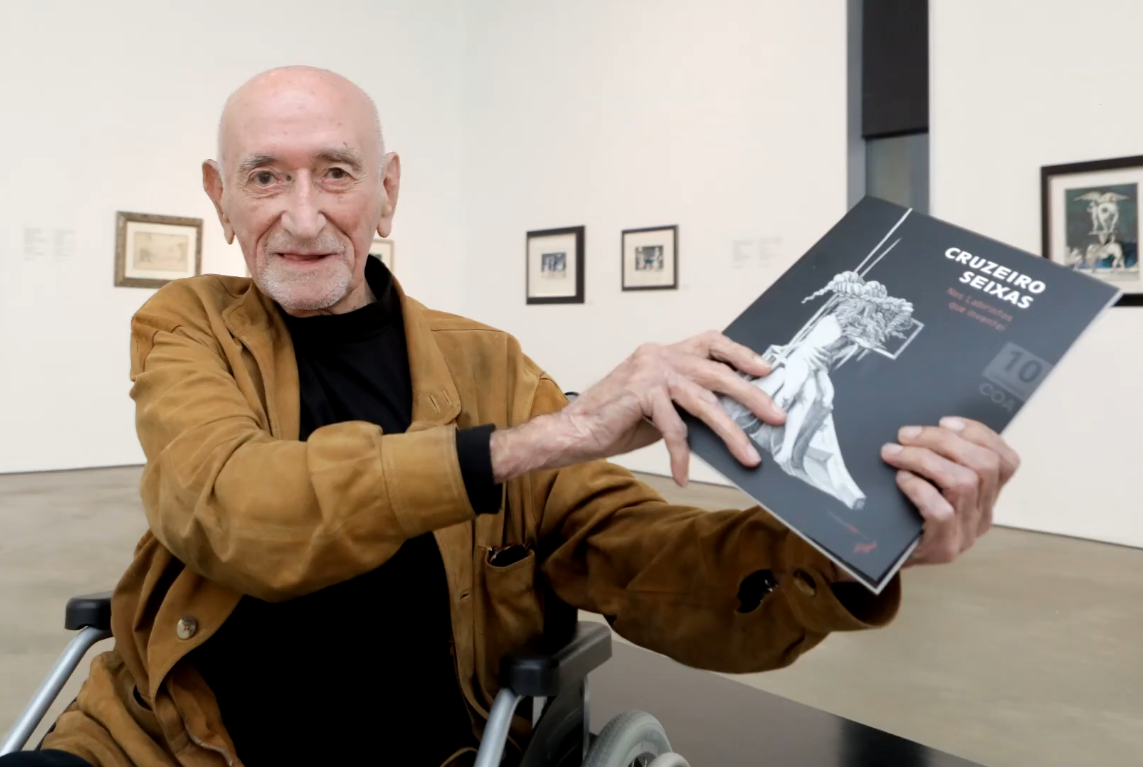
- Born: December 3, 1920; Amadora Portugal
- Died: November 8, 2020 (aged 99); Lisbon
- Known for: Painter, Poet
- Movement: Surrealism

Cruzeiro Seixas, full name Artur Manuel Rodrigues do Cruzeiro Seixas (December 3, 1920 – November 8, 2020), was a "man who paints" (the designation of "painter" annoyed him) and a Portuguese poet.

== Biography ==
He attended the António Arroio School, where he befriended Mário Cesariny, Marcelino Vespeira, Júlio Pomar and Fernando Azevedo.

In the mid-1940s it approaches neorealism, which it moves away from when it adheres to the principles of surrealism. Together with Mário Cesariny, António Maria Lisboa, Carlos Calvet, Pedro Oom, João Artur da Silva, and Mário-Henrique Leiria, among others, he is part of the Surrealist Group of Lisbon, resulting from the division of the newly formed surrealist Portuguese movement. He participated in the exhibition of this group in 1949 (1st surrealists' exhibition, Lisbon).

In 1950 he enlisted in the Merchant Navy and traveled to Africa, India and Asia. In 1951 he was based in Angola, developing activity in the Luanda Museum. It dates from this time the beginning of his poetic production. It holds the first individual exhibitions, which raise a heated movement of opinion (the first of drawings on the evocation of Aimé Cesaire in 1953; the second mainly of 'objects' and 'collages', 1957).

He returned to Portugal in 1964. In 1966 he was invited by Natália Correia to illustrate the famous work "Anthology of Erotic and Satirical Portuguese Poetry".

He received a scholarship from the Calouste Gulbenkian Foundation in 1967. That same year he made a short retrospective at Galeria Buchholz (with steering sheet by Pedro Oom and preface by Rui Mário Gonçalves) and exhibited at Galeria Divulgação, Porto. In 1970 he exhibited individually at the Galeria de S. Mamede, Lisbon, a set of drawings "of a cruel imagery, possible illustrations of Lautréamont".

He worked as a programmer at Galerias 111 and São Mamede, Lisbon. Traveling through Europe he came into contact with members of international surrealism. He was based in the Algarve in the 1980s, working as a programmer in several galleries. He collaborated in international magazines linked to surrealism, to which he has always remained faithful.

The sharp trace of Cruzeiro Seixas, "of sharp limits and atmospheres of vertigo [...] builds a broke world in which the dreamlike and literary face does not hide the violence of the whole, destroying the possibility of stillness." But this primordial and unsettling night "knew how to coexist with lighter and happier landscapes, as some of those painted in the years of Angola, and with plastic quotations from the history of art, in a game of great plastic pleasure, as well as with objects endowed with blatant poetics, in its simplicity of materials, techniques and imaginative start".Cruzeiro Seixas

On June 8, 2009, he was awarded the rank of Grand Officer of the Ancient, Nobilíssimo and Enlightened Military Order of Santiago da Espada, of Scientific, Literary and Artistic Merit.

He lived the last days of his life at Casa do Artista in Lisbon.

He died on November 8, 2020, at the Hospital de Santa Maria in Lisbon.
