= Luiz Pacheco =

Portuguese writer (1925–2008)

Luiz Pacheco (May 7, 1925 in Lisbon – January 5, 2008 in Montijo) was a writer, publisher, polemicist and literary critic (mainly of Portuguese literature). The publishing house Contraponto, his creation, released works by many previously unpublished Portuguese writers (Herberto Helder, Natália Correia, Mário Cesariny de Vasconcelos, Vergílio Ferreira, António Maria Lisboa), and introduced Sade to the Portuguese readers.

== Life ==
He was born at Rua da Estefânia in the São Sebastião da Pedreira district. His father was a civil servant and an amateur musician. Only child of a middle-class family with roots in Alentejo, soon Luiz Pacheco had read all the books of his family considerable-sized library. Since early age he was asthmatic and short-sighted, and later in his life it became impossible for him to read. He was arrested twice while a minor for romantic involvements with young girls. He compulsively married one of these girls who became pregnant when he was 18 years old. She was 15 years old. After one year, he turned to her younger sister. The three of them lived together during a spell, with all his children. It was then that he wrote A Comunidade (The Community), his centrepiece; it portrays that period. His women were always his intellectual inferiors, the first two were peasants. He loved to teach them to read. He had eight children from three different wives.

He studied in Camões high school, being the best student of his year, and later he was enrolled at the Faculdade de Letras of the University of Lisbon, dropping out due to financial troubles. Mário Soares, Urbano Tavares Rodrigues and Artur Ramos were his classmates. He used to say his highschool grade was 18 (out of 20), while Urbano Tavares Rodrigues’ was 12. Urbano, a somewhat popular Portuguese writer, was one of Pacheco's ‘favourite enemies’. After dropping out from the University of Lisbon, Pacheco decided to become an autodidact, and he did manage it. He was a compulsive reader and always had an analytic point of view, as one could see from some of his books, always underlined and with his own comments.

In 1946 he got a job at the state-run Inspecção Geral de Espectáculos as a fiscal for theatre plays, music shows and movies. Some people say he was a censor, but nothing could be farther away from the truth. In fact, he saw this as an opportunity to watch plays and films for free. There was never a single play or movie prohibited or altered due to his action. This was perhaps a way to antagonize the dictatorship he always condemned with all his strengths. But then he decided that he couldn't take it and left. Since that time he never had a proper job again. He wrote articles for newspapers and magazines, including O Globo, Bloco, Afinidades, O Volante, Diário Ilustrado, Diário Popular and Seara Nova, he made translations, and was an excellent proof reader. A libertine, always living through hardships, he depended on his friends' good will; he used to classify them according to the amount of money he could borrow from them each time. He sold books and pamphlets edited by Contraponto for survival. When there was money to spend he was extremely generous toward his friends and people in need.

During the years of financial instability, he lived in many houses, rented rooms, pensions, all over the country, and many important documents have been lost in these constant moves. Charismatic places for Pacheco, where he wrote many of his works were Caldas da Rainha and Setúbal, but, as he once said, being away from Lisbon blurred his view and critical sense. He never had an affiliation to any political party, although in his late years he publicly asked the Portuguese Communist Party to accept him, because he wanted to be warm when he died, and what better than the Party's flag! A dedicated literary and cultural critic, he became famous (and feared) for his sarcastic and irreverent critical writings. He denounced intellectual dishonesty and the censorship imposed by Salazar's Estado Novo regime.

Tall, thin and skinny, bald, wearing eyeglasses with thick lenses, dressing second-hand clothes (sometimes ragged and undersized ones), hypersensitive to alcohol (he enjoyed red wine and beer), hypochondriac, always foreseeing his own death (due to asthma and a poor heart condition), cynical but honest, paradoxical, he is a worthy heir of Luís de Camões, Bocage, Gomes Leal or Fernando Pessoa.

== Writings ==
Luiz Pacheco published many of his writings in Contraponto, mainly short stories and critical texts concerning Portuguese literature. He wrote thousands of letters to friends with enormous literary value and many of them were published in different books. Comunidade, O Libertino passeia por Braga, a idolátrica, o seu esplendor and Teodolito are his most acclaimed books. Pacheco versus Cesariny is an 'epistolary novel' of the surrealist movement in Portugal. His frontal way of analysing works was feared by many. Fernando Namora, a known Portuguese writer, is an example of this: Luiz Pacheco heard about some coincidences between two books by Fernando Namora and Virgilio Ferreira. Deciding to decipher the mystery, he bought every edition of the two books he could lay his hands on and compared them in order to find the coincidences and who copied whom. The result was published by the name of O Caso do Sonâmbulo Chupista. Most of his books are currently not available in book stores. Here is an incomplete list of his published works.

- História antiga e conhecida (1956) - republished in ‘Crítica de circunstância’ in 2002 as ‘Os doutores, a salvação e o menino Jesus’
- Caca, cuspo & Ramela (1958)- with Natália Correia and Manuel de Lima
- Carta-Sincera a José Gomes Ferreira (1959)
- O Teodolito (1962)
- Comunidade (1964)
- Coro de escárnio e lamentação dos cornudos em volta de S.Pedro (1966)
- Crítica de Circunstância (1966)
- Textos Locais (1967)
- O Libertino Passeia por Braga, a Idolátrica, o Seu Esplendor (1970)
- Exercícios de estilo (1971)
- Literatura comestível (1972)
- Pacheco versus Cesariny - folhetim de feição epistolográfica (1974)
- Textos de Circunstância (1977)
- Carta a Gonelha (1977)
- Textos Malditos (1977)
- Textos de Guerrilha 1 (1979)
- O Caso das Criancinhas Desaparecidas (1981)
- Textos de Guerrilha 2 (1981)
- Textos do Barro (1985)
- O Teodolito e a velha casa (1985)
- Textos Sadinos (1991)
- Carta a Fátima (1992)
- O uivo do coiote (1992)
- Memorando, Mirabolando (1995)
- Cartas na mesa: 1966-1996 (1996)
- Prazo de validade (1998)
- Isto de estar vivo (2000)
- Uma admirável droga (2001)
- Mano forte (2002)
- Os doutores, a salvação e o menino Jesus (2002)
- Raio de Luar (2003)
- Figuras, figurantes e figurões (2004)
- Diário remendado 1971-1975 (2005)
- Cartas ao léu (2005)
- O crocodilo que voa (2008) - interviews

=== Dictionnaire Philosophique translation ===
Circa 1965, Luiz Pacheco's friend Bruno da Ponte asked him for help translating volume one of Voltaire's Dictionnaire Philosophique. Even though Pacheco was paid in advance for the job, he missed the deadline without completing any of the work assigned to him. After much pressure from Bruno da Ponte, he began typing away his translation as he read from the book, but not having a dictionary at hand, he decided to temporarily replace every word he didn't know with a vulgarism in red ink. Unfortunately, he forgot about it and the draft was rushed to print without being proofed by either translator or the editor. The printers obediently set every word given to them and, as it was common practice, used italics for those words typed in red. Pacheco eventually realised he had forgotten to take out the vulgarisms and raced to the printers in time to halt production of the book. However, his revisions weren't thorough enough, and the first edition of the book still came out with a footnote on page 273 bearing reference to "delicious shit sandwiches".

== Death ==
On 5 January 2008, Pacheco died in Montijo. The Portuguese television channel RTP 2 broadcast a biographical documentary about his life, filmed in his last years, where Nobel laureate in Literature José Saramago, former Portuguese statesman Mário Soares, and Luiz Pacheco himself, among other figures, commented the writer's eccentric life and work.
