= Teodomiro =

Teodomiro is a masculine given name which may refer to:

- Theodemir (Suebian king) (Spanish and Portuguese: Teodomiro) (died 570), King of Galicia
- Teodomiro (bishop of Mondoñedo), Roman Catholic Bishop of Mondoñedo from 972 to 977
- Teodomiro Menéndez (1879–1978), Spanish Asturian politician and socialist syndicalist
- Teodomiro Leite de Vasconcelos (1944–1997), Mozambican journalist and writer

== See also ==
- Theodemir, a related given name
