= Theodemir =

- Gender: masculine
- Language: Germanic

Other names
- Variant form: Theodemar Theudemer Theudimer Theudemar Theudemir

Theodemir, Theodemar, Theudemer or Theudimer was a Germanic name common among the various Germanic peoples of early medieval Europe. According to Smaragdus of Saint-Mihiel (9th century), the form Theudemar is Frankish and Theudemir is Gothic.

- Theodemer (Frankish king), early 5th century
- Theodemir (Ostrogothic king) (died 475), Ostrogothic king
- Theodemir (Suebian king) (died 570), Suevic King of Galicia
- Theodemir (Visigoth) (died 743), Visigothic nobleman
- Theodemir (saint) (died 851), Spanish saint
- Theodemar of Monte Cassino (fl. late 8th century), abbot of Monte Cassino
- Theodemir of Iria (died 847), bishop of Iria Flavia
- Theodemir (bishop of Mondoñedo), flourished 972–77

== See also ==
- Teodomiro
