= Figueiredo Sobral =

Portuguese painter, sculptor and poet

- Figueiredo Sobral
- Born: 1926; Lisbon, Portugal
- Died: 13 August 2010 (aged 83–84); Lisbon, Portugal
- Occupation: Artist
- Known for: Monumental sculptures and murals

Figueiredo Sobral (1926 – 13 August 2010) was a Portuguese painter, sculptor and poet. His monumental sculptures and murals are displayed in public spaces in Portugal and Brazil. His work is held in many public and private collections.

== Life ==
Jose Maria Figueiredo Sobral was born in Lisbon in 1926. He graduated from the Antonio Arroio Decorative Arts School (Escola Secundária Artística António Arroio) where he studied under Lino António, Paula Campos and Rodrigues Alves. Sobral worked in a range of media including painting, graphic design, illustration, scenography and poetry. His paintings were first shown publicly at the General Exhibitions of Fine Arts (SNBA, Lisbon) immediately after World War II (1939–45). He joined the Portuguese surrealist group formed by Antônio Maria Lisboa and Cesariny Vasconcelos. His first individual exhibition was in Castelo de Vide in 1952. Since then his work has been shown in many individual and group exhibitions.

Until the late 1950s Sobral worked in creative advertising and a graphic illustration. He also wrote poetry and drama, and worked as a layout designer. He was critical of the regime of António de Oliveira Salazar, and was arrested several times for political reasons. He took up sculpture in the 1960s, and then ceramics. In 1970 he began to collaborate in making tapestry with the Manufactura de Tapeçarias de Portalegre. He was a co-founder of the Minotauro publishing house with Urbano Tavares Rodrigues. This company published the Minotauro magazine. In 1975 he moved to Americana, São Paulo, where he created a sculpture for the city entrance at the invitation of former Mayor Ralph Biasi. Figueiredo Sobral died on 13 August 2010 in Lisbon at the age of 85.

Sobral's monumental sculptures and mural paintings are installed in urban public spaces in Brazil and Portugal. His work is held in the Boston Museum, The Art World Gallery, Michigan and the Interart Gallery, Miami, and in private collections in Portugal, Antwerp, Brussels, Paris, Toulon, São Paulo and Chicago.

== Individual exhibitions ==
- n.d. - Porto (Portugal) - Galeria Dois
- n.d. - Porto (Portugal) - Galeria Opinião
- 1978 - Santos SP - Galeria Stella Maris
- 1979 - Guarujá SP - Civiltec Feira de Arte
- 1979 - São Paulo SP - Galeria Paulo Prado
- 1980 - Santos SP - Figueiredo Sobral, desenho, escultura e aquarela, no CCBEU
- 1981 - Lisbon (Portugal) - Galeria São Mamede
- 1984 - Lisbon (Portugal) - Galeria São Francisco
- 1984 - São Paulo SP - Galeria Paulo Prado

== Prizes and medals ==
- 1959 F. Tomar first prize
- 1960 QFUC first prize
- 1961 Antoniana Exhibition third prize
- 1961 VII Autumntime Exhibition Bronze Medal
- 1963 IX Autumntime Exhibition Bronze Medal
- 1964 II Modern Art Hall Silver Medal
- MAC'2000 - Career, MAC – Movimento Arte Contemporânea, Lisbon.

== Sources ==
- Biografia de Figueiredo Sobral, Galeria Sesimbra, 1999
- "Figueiredo Sobral". Itaú Cultural (in Portuguese). Archived from the original on 2015-04-02.
- "Figueiredo Sobral". Manufactura de Tapeçarias de Portalegre.
- "Figueiredo Sobral". Movimento Arte Contemporânea.
- "O pintor, escultor e poeta José Maria Figueiredo Sobral". ematejoca azul. 2011-01-10.
