= San Fernando Cemetery =

San Fernando Cemetery may refer to:

- Panteón de San Fernando, Mexico City, Mexico
- Cemetery of San Fernando, Seville, Spain
- San Fernando Mission Cemetery, Los Angeles, California, United States
- San Fernando Pioneer Memorial Cemetery, Los Angeles, California, United States
