= Alberto da Costa e Silva =

Brazilian historian, poet and diplomat (1931–2023)

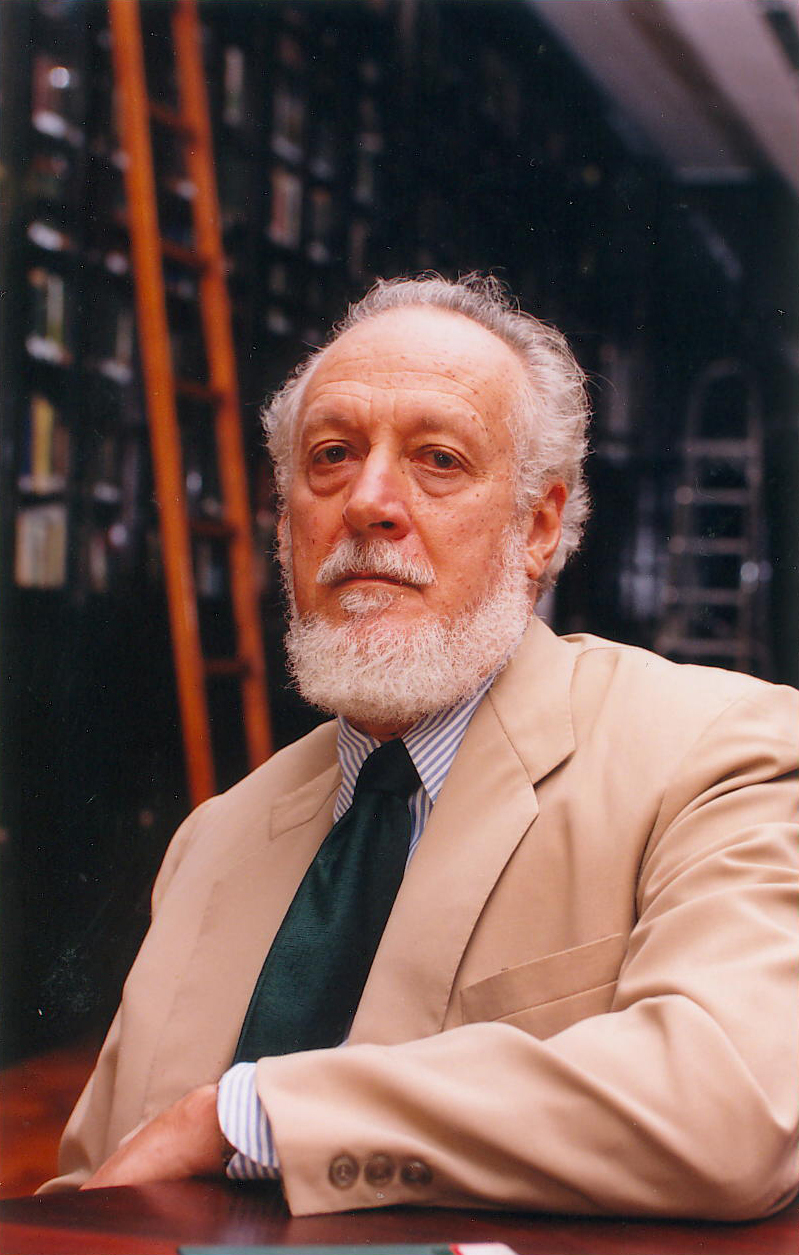
- Born: 12 May 1931; São Paulo, Brazil
- Died: 26 November 2023 (aged 92); Rio de Janeiro, Brazil
- Occupations: Historian, poet, former diplomat

Alberto da Costa e Silva (12 May 1931 – 26 November 2023) was a Brazilian historian, poet, and diplomat. He won the 2014 Camões Prize.

== Diplomacy ==
Da Costa e Silva was ambassador of Brazil to Portugal from 1986 to 1990, to Colombia from 1990 to 1993, and to Paraguay from 1993 to 1995.

== Death ==
Da Costa e Silva died on 26 November 2023, at the age of 92.

== Works ==
=== History ===
- A Enxada e a Lança: a África antes dos Portugueses
- A Manilha e o Libambo: a África e a Escravidão, de 1500 a 1700
- Imagens da África (2013)
