= João Barrento (translator) =

Portuguese writer, critic and translator

João Barrento (born 1940) is a Portuguese writer, critic and translator. He is the winner of the 2023 Camoes Prize. He was born in Alter do Chao. He studied German at the University of Lisbon (1958–64), where he also wrote a thesis on the work of Harold Pinter. He later taught in Hamburg and Lisbon.

Barrento is one of the pre-eminent Portuguese translators of German literature. He has translated numerous authors, among them Goethe, Robert Musil, Hugo von Hofmannsthal, Erich Fried, Michael Krüger, Gottfried Benn, Christa Wolf, Paul Celan, Johannes Bobrowski, Thomas Bernhard, Georg Trakl, Peter Handke and Heiner Müller.
