= Cemetery of San Fernando =

Cemetery in Seville, Andalucia, Spain

Coordinates: 37°25′09″N 5°58′51″W

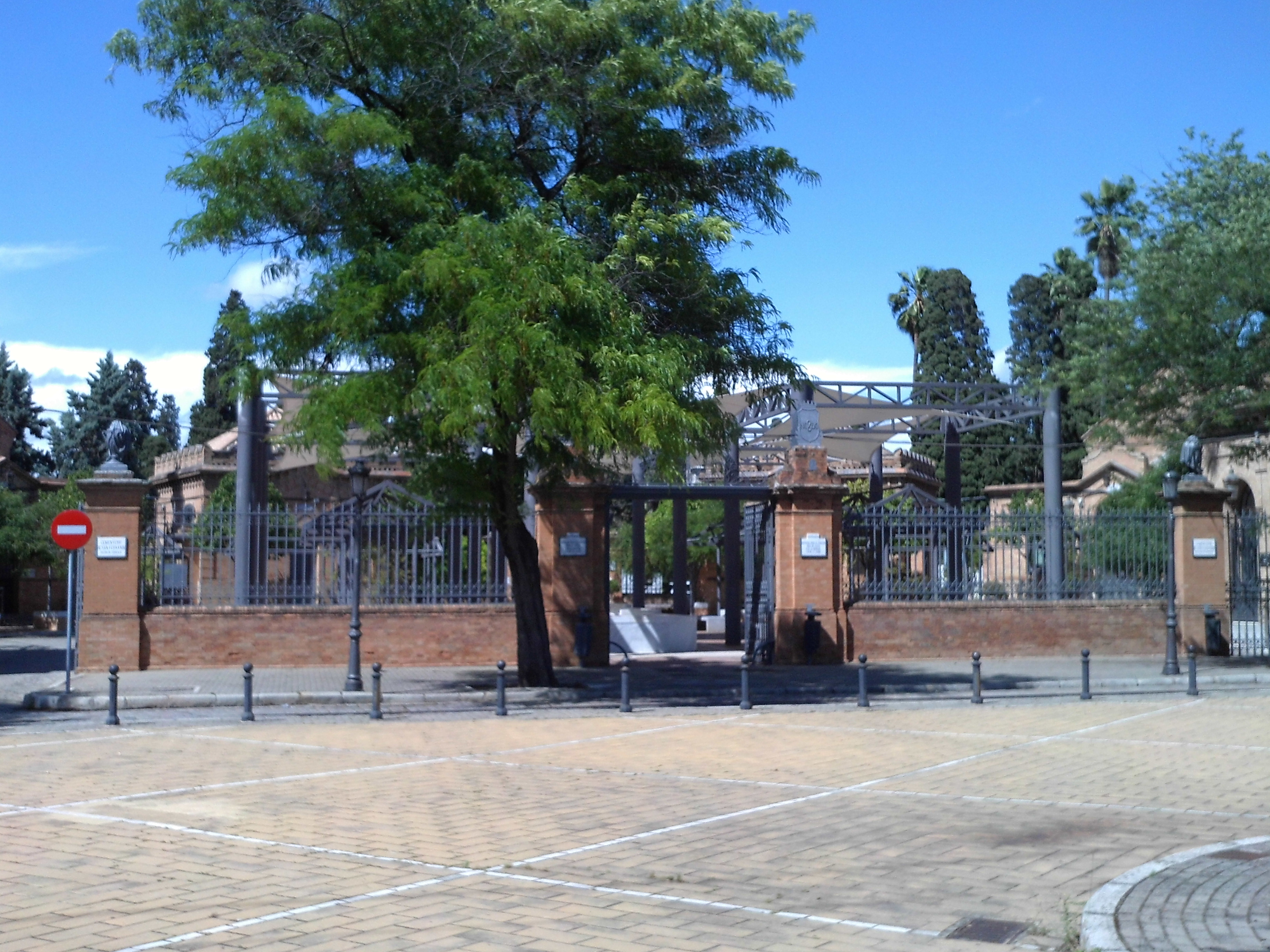
Main entrance of the Cementerio de San Fernando

The Cemetery of San Fernando (Spanish: El Cementerio de San Fernando) is located in the San Jerónimo district, north of the city of Seville, Andalusia, Spain. It was built in 1852, and it is the only municipal cemetery in the city. It has an area of 28 hectares (69 acres) and is considered as one of the most famous cemeteries in Spain.

== Layout ==
The boundaries of the cemetery are roughly shaped like an upside-down pyramid. The main entrance is at the southwest corner, which gives access to a long 800-metre main road. The cemetery has three sections, separated by two roundabouts. The lower third is 360 metres long, and stretches from the southern entrance to the roundabout containing the crucified Antonio Susillo. The part of the main road in this section is called Calle de la Fe (Faith Street). From this roundabout to the next roundabout, the road stretches 120 metres and is called Calle de la Esperanza (Hope Street). From that roundabout to the end there is a final 240 metres of road called Calle Caridad (Charity Street).

The long road is crossed by parallel roads. Some are named after saints, for example St. Rufino, St. Braulio, St. Justo, St. Teodomiro, St. Romulo and St. Geroncio. Near the end there are two parallel streets named after the Virgin Mary and St. Saviour.

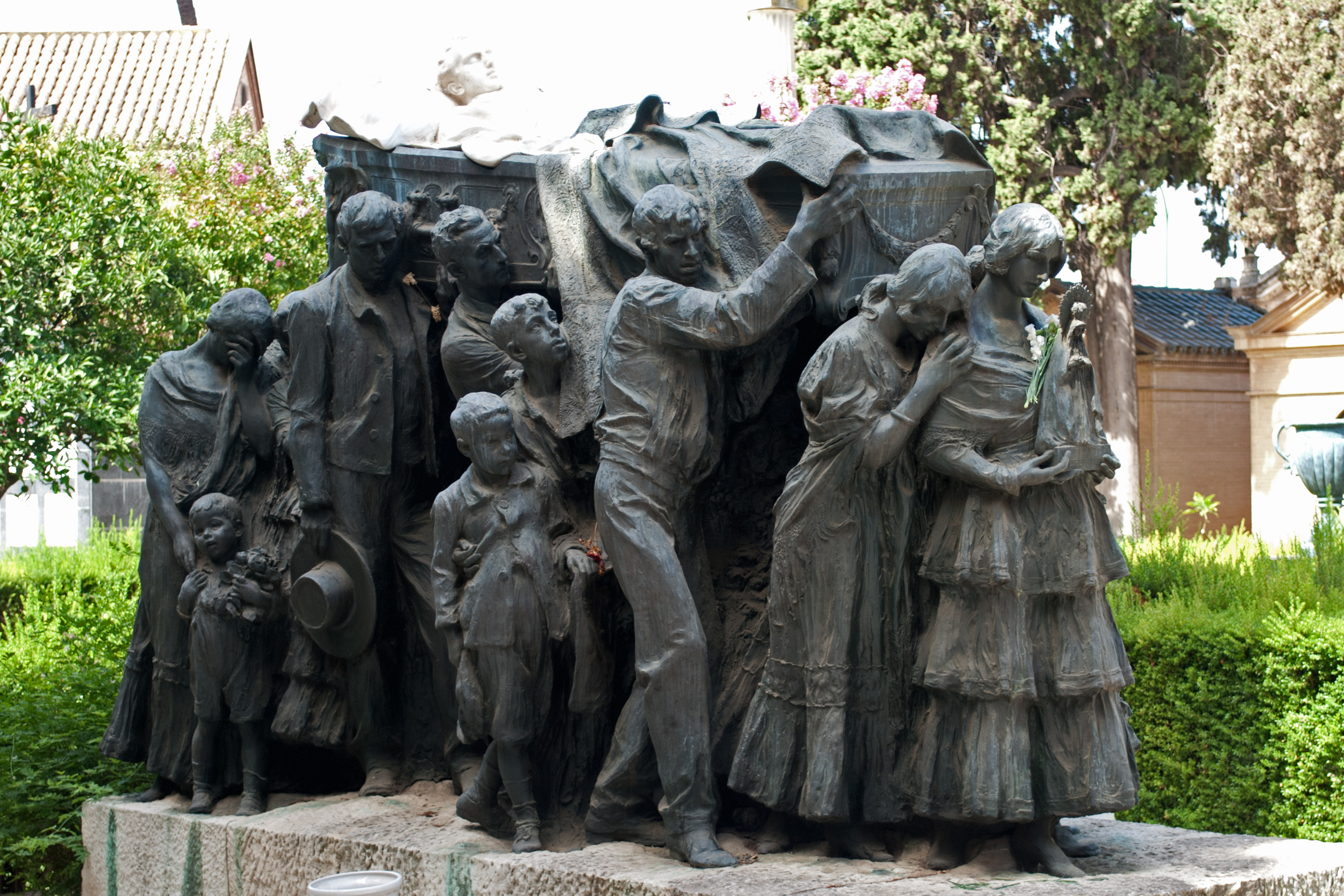
Funerary monument at the tomb of the bullfighter Joselito.

== History ==
=== Background ===
Until the 19th century, it was usual for the middle and upper classes to be buried in crypts in the basement of churches, usually under tombstones. In the 1609 Constitutions of the Archbishopric, it was decided that funeral monuments could only be made inside churches in cases where they were in a chapel paid for by the deceased. The lower classes buried their dead in the cemeteries of parishes and hospitals. Almost all the burials took place in religious places near the population although there were some cemeteries located on the outskirts of cities.

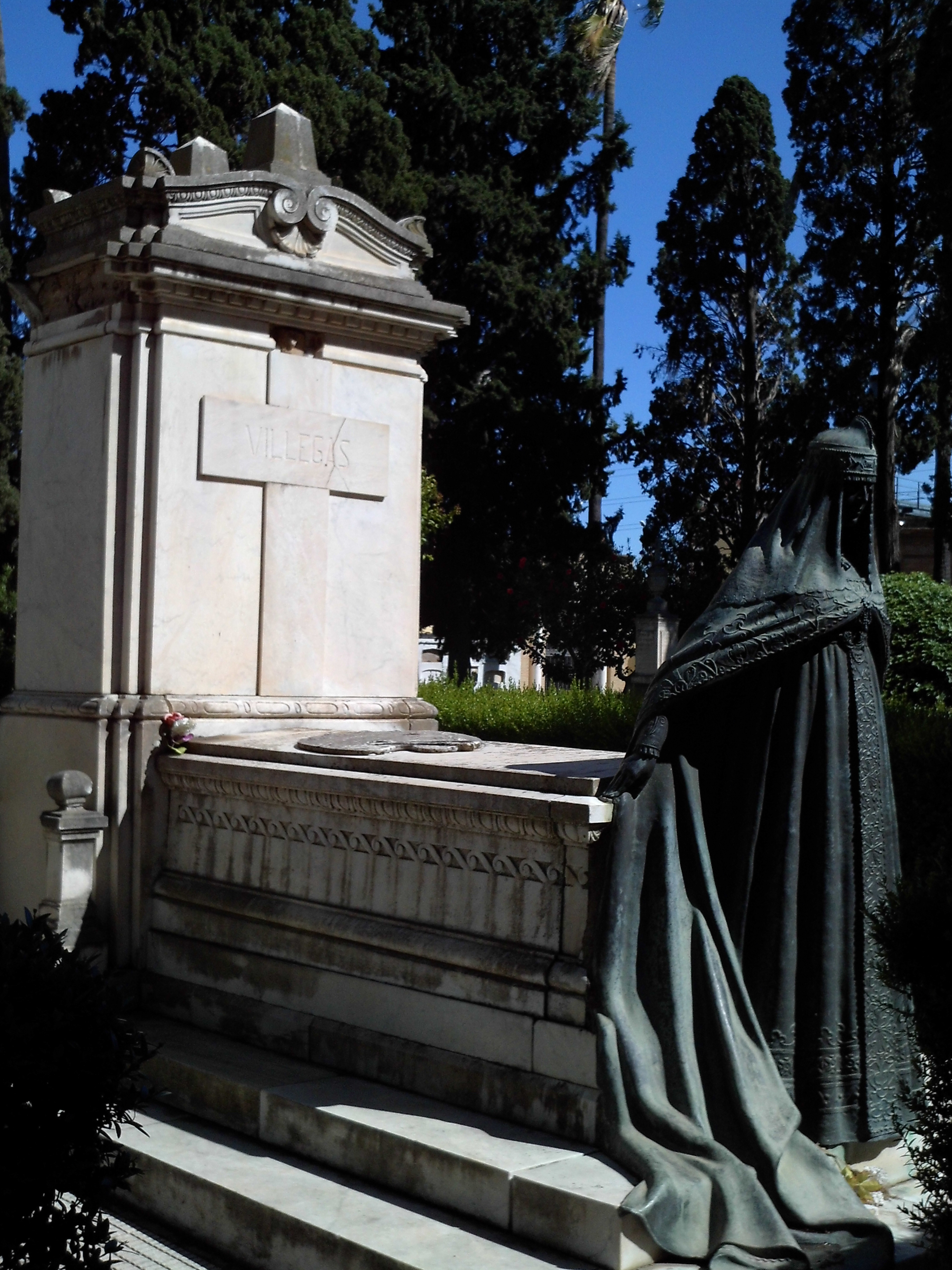
Tomb of the painter José Villegas Cordero

When the 18th century politician Pablo de Olavide designed his "Nuevas Poblaciones" for Andalusia, a cemetery on the outskirts of the town was always part of this project. However, when Olavide was an assistant in Seville, there is no record of him planning a cemetery located outside the town.

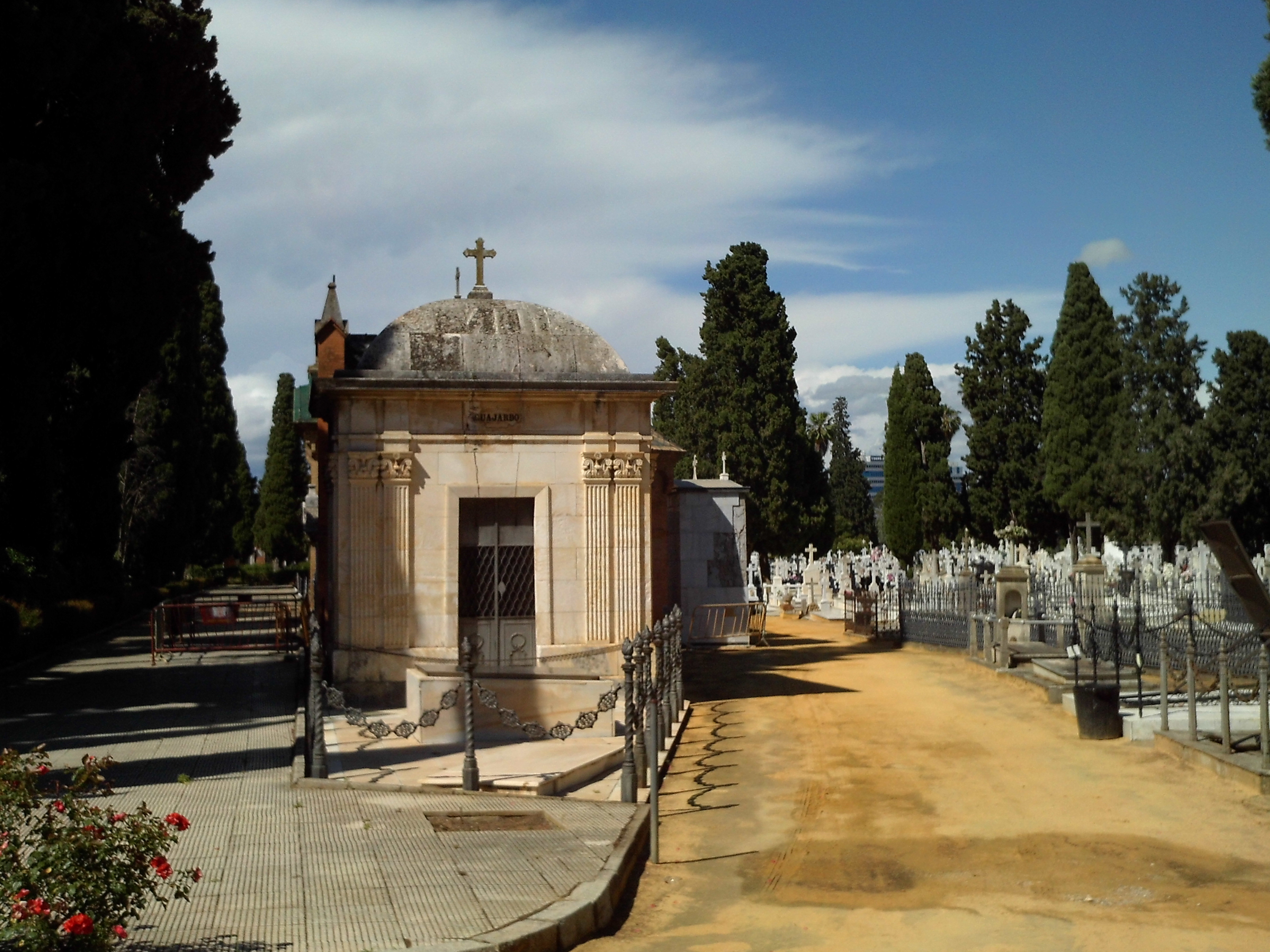
On the left, the pantheon of the Riquelme family, designed in 1888 by Juan Talavera de la Vega.

Between 1800 and 1801, there was an epidemic of yellow fever in the city that killed some 14,000 people. This led to the creation of a large temporary cemetery near the hospital St. Lázaro.

=== Cementerio de San Sebastián ===
The first municipal public cemetery built outside the walls was that of San Sebastian in the 1820s. In the 17th century there were already some Christian burials near the chapel of San Sebastián, which occurred during the plague epidemics of 1600 and 1649. However, the place was not suitable for this purpose, as stated in a document by the mayor of the city who was also member of the Brotherhood of San Sebastian, Pedro Esteban de Morales, in 1728.

In 1819, the San Sebastián Brotherhood created a private tomb in the atrium of the San Sebastián chapel, to make a profit from the burials. In 1821, the cathedral chapter asked the brotherhood for permission to do something similar, and in the end they built some niches in the north wall. In 1825, the architect Julián de la Vega designed a public tomb with 202 niches, behind the chapel of San Sebastián. The work was completed around 1828. The niches were rented for 7 years, there was also a mass grave for the poor.

The drenching of the bodies, the accumulation of water in the surroundings, and the lack of maintenance of the enclosure caused it to become ruined in the 1850s. It was closed in 1885.

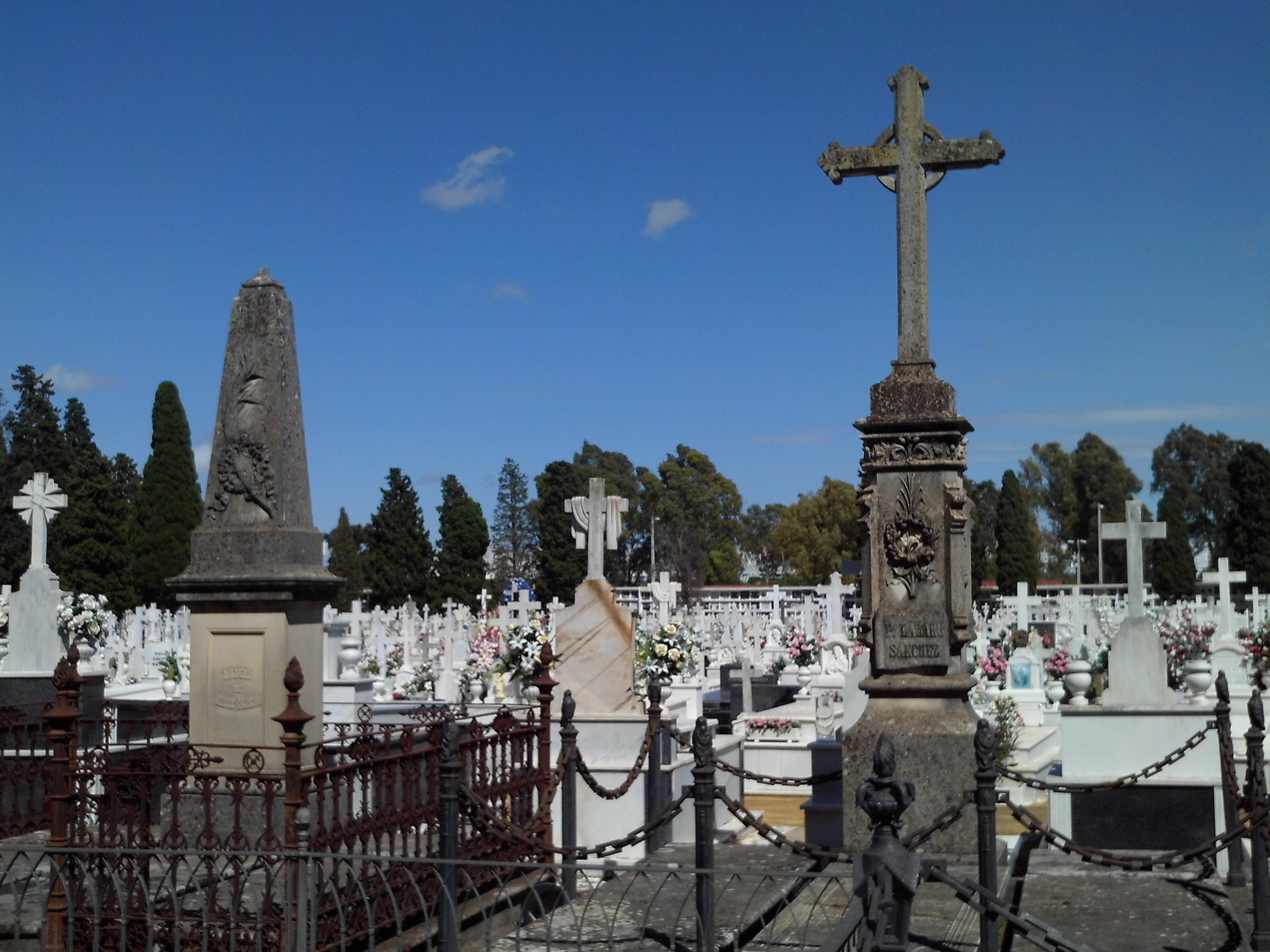
A section of the cemetery in 2016

=== Cementerio de San José ===
In 1832 the municipal architect Melchor Cano drew up a plan to build a public cemetery in the Antequera or Cerragera farm, which adjoins the monastery of La Cartuja". It was inaugurated on 1 March 1833. Although it remained in good condition, it was not chosen to become a general cemetery for the city, and as it was too small even for the Triana neighbourhood. It was finally closed in 1885. The bodies buried there were exhumed in 1901, and the municipal land was sold in 1907. The Municipal Housing Board built the San José neighborhood on that plot in 1924.

=== Cementerio de San Fernando ===
The City Council decided to create a large necropolis to serve the city and the land finally chosen was that of San Lazaro, to the north of the city. In 1851, the municipal architect Balbino Marrón y Ranero presented a draft of his project for the cemetery. In it he proposed to create few niches (only for strangers and people without family) and that most people would be buried in graves in the ground. Although in the creation of the cemetery in Gijón in 1850 niches were considered a sign of distinction, the opposite was the norm in Spain. As far as family burials were concerned, Balbino Marrón arranged for the creation of mausoleums or pantheons for "magnates" and large burials where 25 to 30 people could be buried, as was already the case in the San Sebastián cemetery. The enclosure was completed in 1852 and the name of San Fernando was chosen on 3 December 1852. On 24 December of the same year the city council drafted the first ordinance on the operation of a public cemetery: "Ordenanzas formadas por el Escelentísimo (sic) Ayuntamiento de Sevilla con motivo de empezar desde el 1º de enero de 1853 las inhumnaciones en el nuevo cementerio de S. Fernando". The facilities were blessed on 3 January 1853.

Since the cemetery opened, burials have begun in various forms, depending on cost, according to the ordinances. There were first, second, and third category individual graves and, after these, individual graves for several people were set up and, on the last level, trenches for several people. At the other end, tombs were built with funerary monuments and family pantheons. Some of these pantheons were designed by Balbino Marron himself.

In 1861, the city council decided to place a monument to the fallen in the African War. José de la Coba Mellado designed a stone monument inspired by the tombs of Asia Minor (mainly lithic). The monument also had plaques with the names of those buried there and the city's gratitude to all of them. On the pedestal there is a cube with a relief in which a female figure representing Victory crowns a lion. On the pedestal there is a column with a Doric shaft topped by cannonballs and a cross.

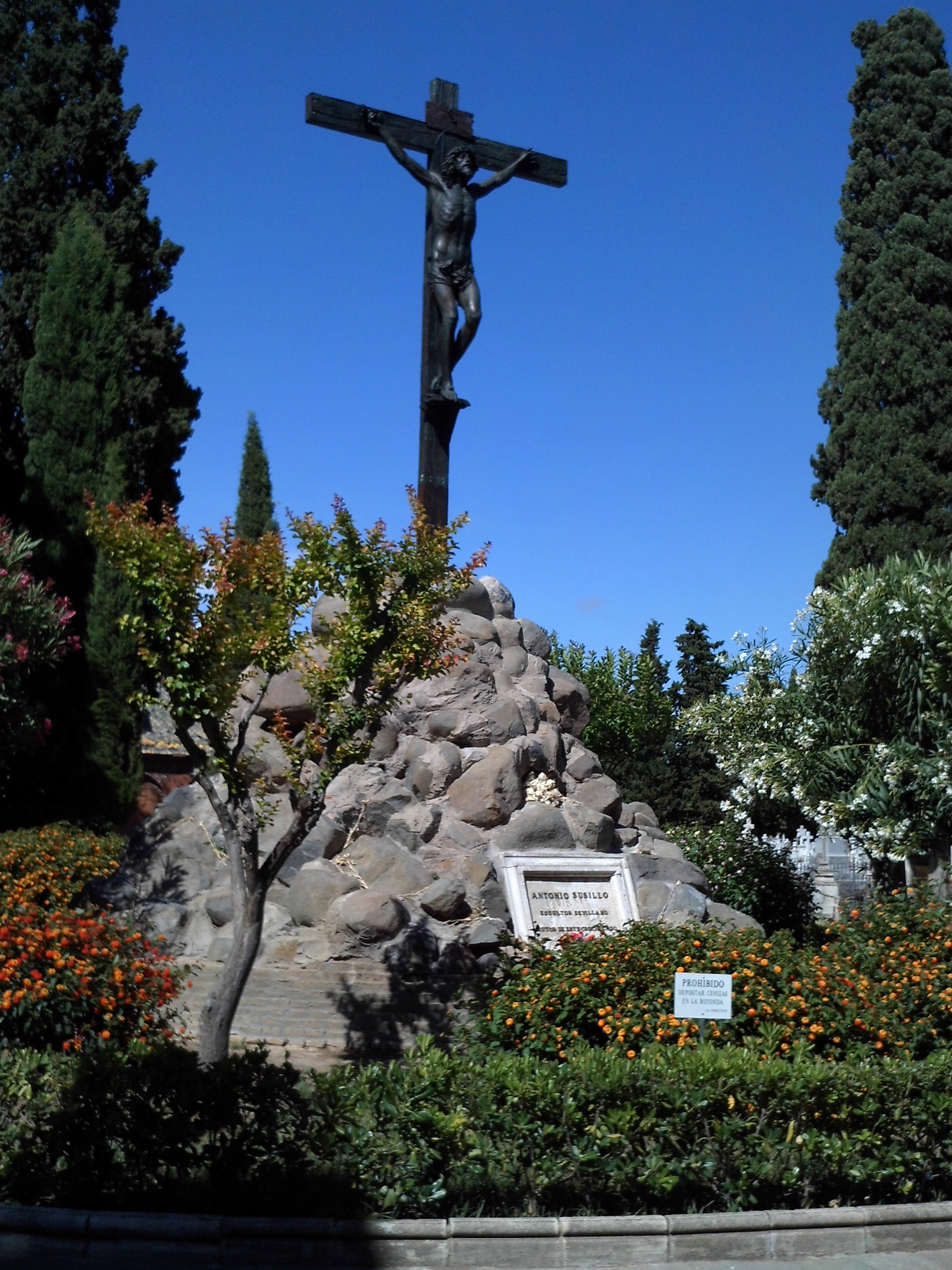
Cristo de las Mieles, made in bronze by Antonio Susillo in 1895

In 1884, Francisco Aurelio Álvarez Millán designed the cover, and in 1886 he designed two buildings to be used for the management of the site. In 1894, Juan José López Sáez designed two guard houses at the back of the front, on both sides of the main avenue.

In 1895, the sculptor Antonio Susillo made a crucifix. There's no telling who commissioned him to do it. On December 22, 1896 Susillo committed suicide. In June 1897, the Town Hall proposed to place Susillo's crucifix in a roundabout on the main avenue of the cemetery. The Town Hall bought the crucifix in October 1897 for 14,000 pesetas. It was placed on a recreation of Golgotha in 1907. The Christ is made of bronze, and the mount is made of piled up rocks. It was baptized by the people as the Christ of the Honey because in the summer of 1907, honey came out of his mouth. This was interpreted as a miracle, although the most likely explanation is that the heat caused a honeycomb to melt from the inside of his mouth.

Although Balbino Marrón planned a cemetery with numerous garden spaces in 1851, in the early 20th century there were only two rows of cypress trees flanking the main avenue and some small trees near some tombs.

Many of the city's best-known architects from the early 20th century built pantheons or tombs in this cemetery: Aníbal González designed the pantheons of Aníbal Fernández Agreda (1918), Francisco López Borda (1919) and Manuel Cañas Martínez (1920). In 1913 the same architect designed the pantheon of the González Álvarez-Ossorio family, which has a replica of the Cachorro, a crucified figure from Triana, inside.

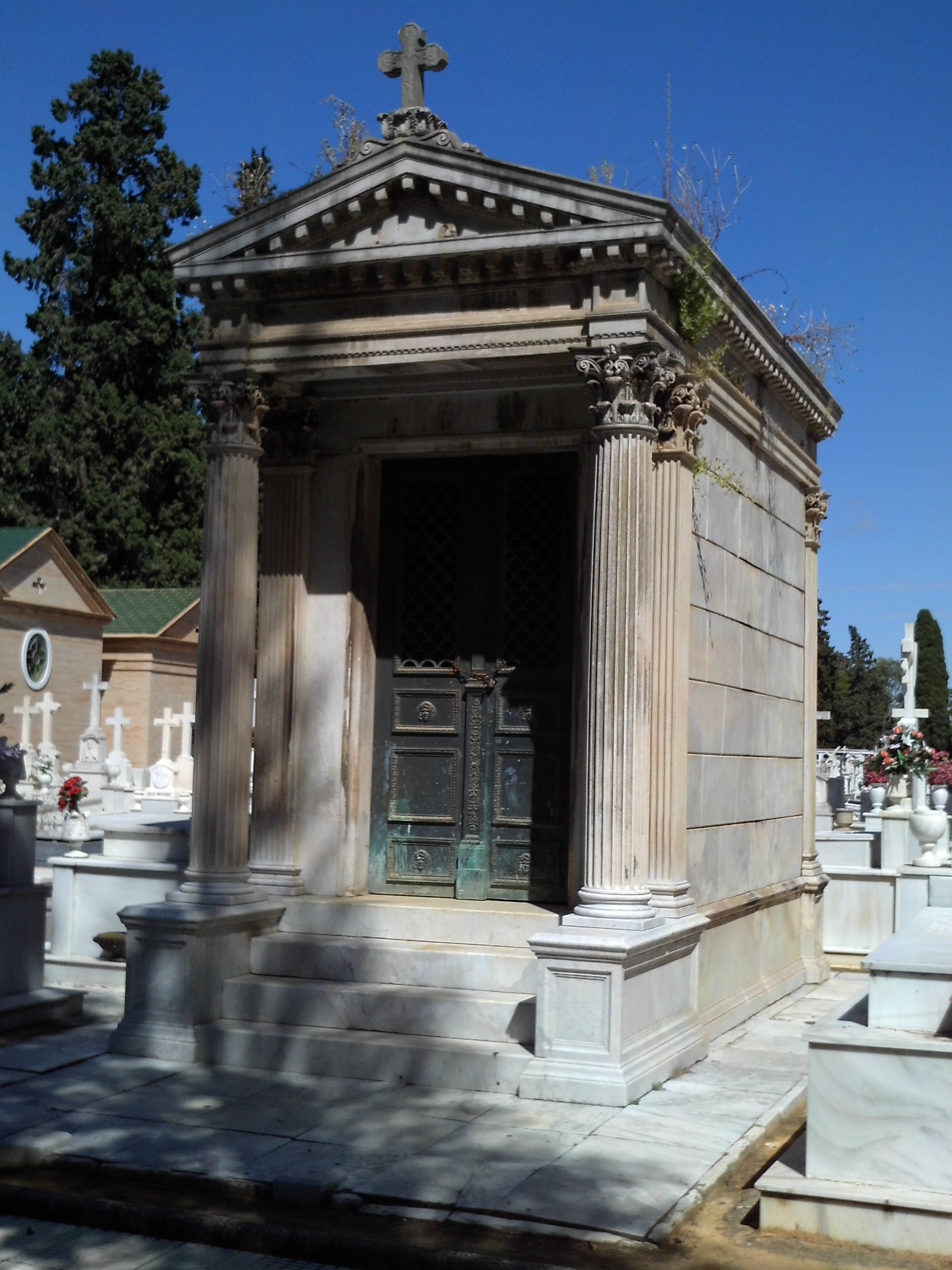
Mausoleum for the Olave family

Vicente Traver made some simple tombs in charge of José Gastalavaner Gimeno (1926). Antonio Illanes made a tombstone with a cross on the floor in the family tomb of the Palomeque family. Juan José López Sáez made crosses with a pedestal for María Melantuche's pantheon (1924). The bronze funeral monument of Joselito el Gallo was designed by Mariano Benlliure in November 1921, and the tomb was completed in its present location in 1926. The sculpture, which shows several people carrying the open casket, prompted a visit from Alfonso XIII in 1930.

In 1926, Gabino Amaya designed a bronze sculpture for the burial of the painter José Villegas Cordero. The work was inspired by the painting The Triumph of the Dogueiraise, which is in Washington DC. It is a large person in a tunic.

Another remarkable pantheon is that of Juan Vázquez de Pablo, designed by Antonio Arévalo in 1927. It is a crypt surrounded by a fence. Above the crypt there is a white stone lying Jesus made by Manuel Delgado Brackenbury in 1930.

The cemetery also has several funeral chapels. One of the cemeteries chapels designed by Aníbal González is the largest on the premises. It is the chapel of Emilia Scholtz, the widow of Cayetano Luca de Tena and Álvarez Ossorio. It was designed in 1912, and the size is 137 m^{2} (1,470 sq ft). It is of neo-Renaissance style. It has a small granite staircase at the front and the walls are made of limestone.

In 1917, new ordinances were drawn up, although without any particularly significant changes. On 4 March 1932, due to the secular nature of the Second Republic, the wall created in the 19th century between the cemetery for dissidents and the Catholic cemetery was ordered to be demolished.

The dissidents were non-Catholics who ended up in the cemetery, suicides, unbaptized children, and those condemned to death by garrotte. It is also provided that the San Fernando cemetery be simply rotated as a municipal cemetery. In 1934, a new municipal ordinance is passed for the operation of the cemetery, where to reinforce its secular character the chaplain is suppressed. In 1936, with the beginning of the Civil War and the repression of Queipo de Llano in the city, four common graves were created in the cemetery in which the Andalusian leader Blas Infante, left-wing councillors, and 3,800 Sevillians (probably communists and anarchists) were buried. In 2002, a pedestal with a white marble monolith was built in that area.

There are a total of eight mass graves in the cemetery that were used from 1852 to the 1960s. Except for the three from the Civil War, the other five were used for homeless people and unclaimed bodies. A total of 28,997 bodies rest in the eight graves.

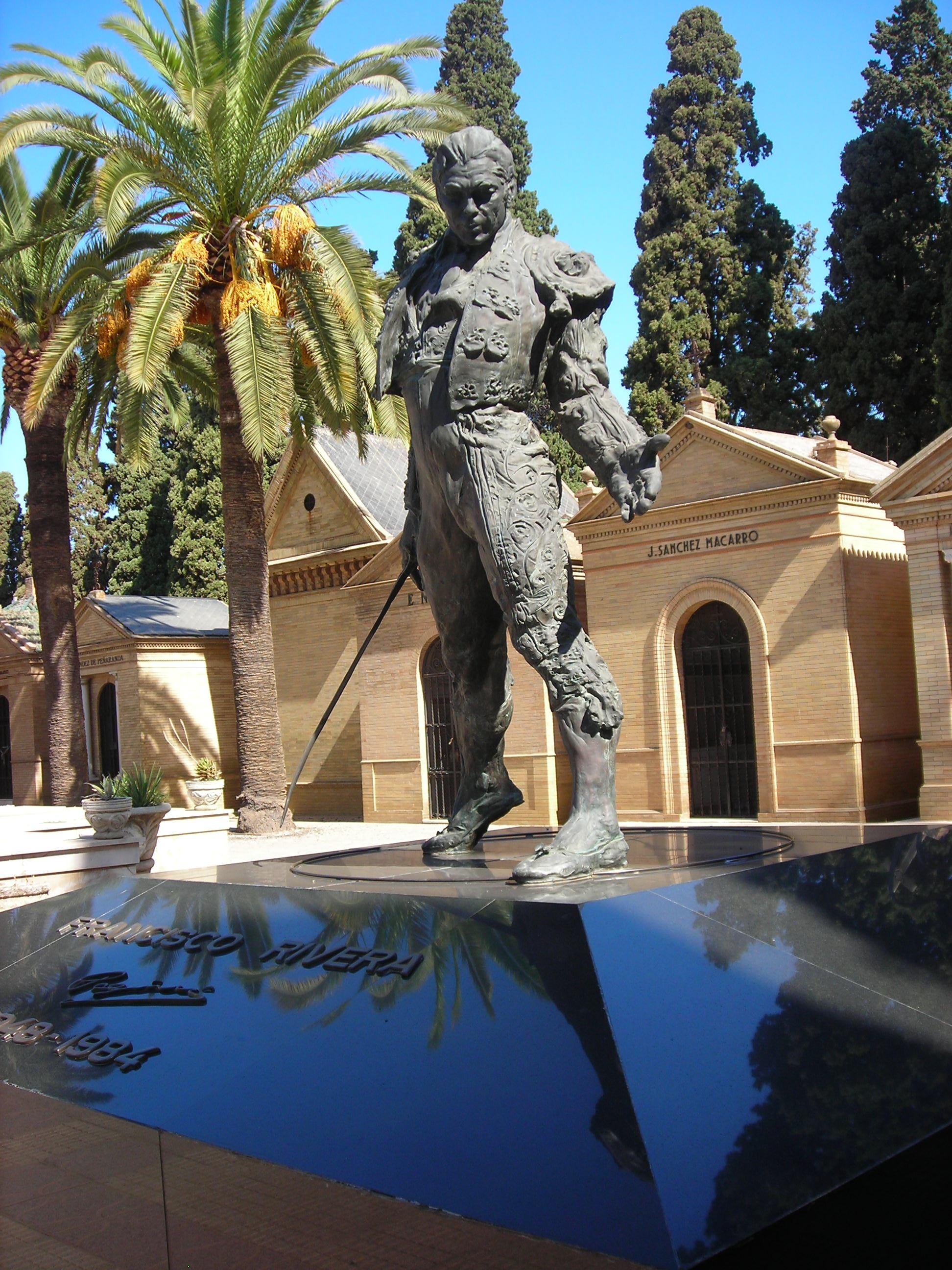
Tomb of the bullfighter Francisco Rivera, nicknamed Paquirri.

After the Republican period the cemetery regained its name. In 1937 and 1938 improvement works were carried out in the main avenue, in the Cristo de las Mieles roundabout and in the cemetery buildings. In 1940 Antonio Susillo's remains were moved from his grave to under the sculpture of the crucified, and a bronze plaque was placed where it is said that his remains lie.

In June 1936, the creation of a new municipal cemetery was budgeted for. However, in 1941, with the public coffers depleted after the war, it was decided to undertake an extension to the north of the San Fernando cemetery. This extension was accepted in 1945. However, some improvement work was carried out in the second half of the 1940s. In the extension of the 1940s, several blocks were made for niches.

In 1947, Juan Talavera y Heredia designed a funeral chapel for the Piarists. This is a building that departs a little from its "Andalusian" stage and that comes to be framed more in the modern movement. It is made of exposed brick, and has a front volume in the shape of a cross. On the front it is engraved with the Greek letters alpha and omega.

Jews began burying themselves in that cemetery in 1883 and by 2010 there were some Hebrew graves. Within the dissident area (whose wall was demolished in the 1930s) there was an area where only Jews were present because in April 1900 this community was given a 70 square meter strip of land for their use. In 1949, a Jewish American congressman who visited Spain with a group of congressmen from his country delivered to the government a series of petitions from the Spanish Jewish community. Among them was the construction of a wall to separate the graves of Protestants (dissidents) from the Israelites in the cemetery of Seville. The government therefore undertook this work. This wall was demolished by the city council in 2010, apparently as a sign of tolerance and non-discrimination.

The first crematorium in the cemetery was placed in 1986. The second crematorium was placed in 1994. In 2000, buildings for four crematoriums were built next to the entrance. In the end, these buildings only housed three. In the year 2000, it seemed necessary to expropriate 32 buildings in the San Jerónimo industrial estate, north of the cemetery, to make new niches in that land. However, the increase in the number of cremations meant that this extension was not undertaken.

In 2000, the cemetery was extended in the southeast area. In 2007, the Town Hall put awnings and other improvements to the main entrance of the cemetery.
