= Vítor Manuel de Aguiar e Silva =

Portuguese scholar and writer

Vítor Manuel de Aguiar e Silva (1939–2022) was a Portuguese scholar, writer and poet.

He was born in the parish of Real in Penalva do Castelo. He studied at the Liceu Nacional de Viseu and the University of Coimbra. He obtained a doctorate in Portuguese literature, and then in 1979, he took up a teaching career at the Faculty of Arts at the University of Coimbra. He later moved to the University of Minho where he served as the vice-rector from 1990 to 2002.

A prolific scholar and writer, he won the Camoes Prize in 2020. He published more than a dozen books on Portuguese literature, among them several works on the Portuguese national poet Luis de Camoes.

He died in September 2022.

In 2024, he received the "Ordem de Camões" award from the President of Portugal Marcelo Rebelo de Sousa. The award is posthumous for his contributions to the Portuguese language and its projection in the world.
