= Camões Prize =

Literary award for Lusophone countries

Camões Prize Prémio Camões
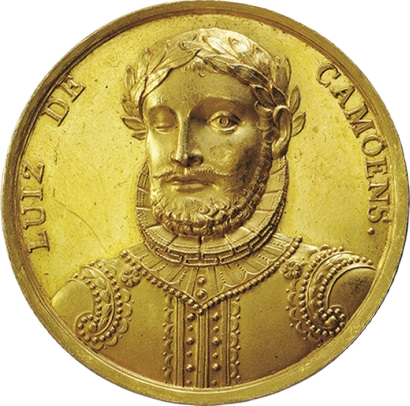
- Country: Lusophone countries
- Presented by: Direção-Geral do Livro, dos Arquivos e das Biblioteca (Portugal) and Fundação Biblioteca Nacional (Brazil)
- Reward: €100,000
- First award: 1989
- Website: http://livro.dglab.gov.pt/sites/DGLB/Portugues/premios/PremioCamoes/Paginas/PremioCamoes.aspx

The Camões Prize (Portuguese: Prémio Camões, Portuguese pronunciation: [ˈpɾɛmju kaˈmõjʃ]), named after Luís de Camões, is the most prestigious prize for literature in the Portuguese language. The prize was established in 1989 and is supported by the governments of Brazil and Portugal. It is awarded annually to the author of an outstanding body of work written in Portuguese. Winners are selected by a jury and have included writers from Angola, Brazil, Cape Verde, Mozambique, and Portugal. The monetary award is €100,000, making it among the richest literary prizes in the world. Past winners include Miguel Torga, Vergílio Ferreira, Jorge Amado, José Saramago, Eugénio de Andrade, Sophia de Mello Breyner Andresen, and Chico Buarque.

== History ==
The Camões Prize was first introduced by the Additional Protocol to the Cultural Agreement between the Government of the Portuguese Republic and the Government of the Federal Republic of Brazil, dated 7 September 1966, which creates the Camões Prize, signed in Brasilia on 22 June 1988, and approved in Portugal by Decree No. 43/88 of 30 November 1988.

This Protocol was replaced by a new one between the Portuguese Republic and the Federative Republic of Brazil, signed in Lisbon on 17 April 1999, approved by Portugal through Decree 47/99 in the official gazette of 5 November 1999.

The first award was made in 1989, with the winner being Miguel Torga. In 2006, José Luandino Vieira became the first person to refuse the award.

== Description ==
The Camões Prize is considered the most prestigious literary award in the Portuguese-speaking world. It is awarded for a body of work that contributes to the dissemination and recognition of Portuguese language. It is awarded annually by the Portuguese Direção-Geral do Livro, dos Arquivos e das Biblioteca (National Book, Archives and Libraries Department) and the Brazilian Fundação Biblioteca Nacional (National Library Foundation). The award consists of a cash prize contributed by Brazil and Portugal. The value of the prize is set annually by agreement between the two countries, and currently stands at €100,000.

Writers in Portuguese from the Community of Portuguese Language Countries are considered for the prize. The winner is chosen by a specially designated jury, with representatives from Brazil, Portugal, and African countries with Portuguese as an official language.

== Past winners ==
Year	Author		Country	Genre(s)	Ref(s)
1989	centro	Miguel Torga (1907 – 1995)	Portugal	poetry, short story, novel, drama, memoirs, essay	
1990		João Cabral de Melo Neto (1920 – 1999)	Brazil	poetry	
1991		José Craveirinha (1922 – 2003)	Mozambique	poetry, journalism	
1992		Vergílio Ferreira (1916 – 1996)	Portugal	novel, short story, memoirs, essay	
1993	centro	Rachel de Queiroz (1910 – 2003)	Brazil	novel, short story, translation, journalism, drama, memoirs, children's literature	
1994	centro	Jorge Amado (1912 – 2001)	Brazil	novel, short story, poetry, children's literature, biography, journalism	
1995	centro	José Saramago (1922 – 2010)	Portugal	novel, short story, drama, poetry, memoirs, journalism, children's literature	
1996	centro	Eduardo Lourenço (1923 – 2020)	Portugal	philosophy, literary criticism, essay	
1997	centro	"Pepetela"-Artur Carlos Maurício Pestana dos Santos (born 1941)	Angola	novel, drama	
1998	centro	António Cândido de Mello e Souza (1918 – 2017)	Brazil	literary criticism, literary theory, essay, poetry	
1999	centro	Sophia de Mello Breyner (1919 – 2004)	Portugal	poetry, short story, drama, children's literature, translation, essay	
2000	centro	Autran Dourado (1926 – 2012)	Brazil	novel, short story, essay, memoirs	
2001	centro	Eugénio de Andrade (1923 – 2005)	Portugal	poetry, children's literature, translation, short story	
2002	centro	Maria Velho da Costa (1938 – 2020)	Portugal	novel, short story, drama, essay, screenplay	
2003		Rubem Fonseca (1925 – 2020)	Brazil	novel, short story, screenplay	
2004	centro	Agustina Bessa-Luís (1922 – 2019)	Portugal	novel, short story, drama, essay, children's literature, biography, memoirs	
2005	centro	Lygia Fagundes Telles (1918 – 2022)	Brazil	novel, short story	
2006		José Luandino Vieira (born 1935) – refused	Portugal / Angola	novel, short story, journalism, children's literature, translation	
2007	centro	António Lobo Antunes (1942 – 2026)	Portugal	novel, short story	
2008	centro	João Ubaldo Ribeiro (1941 – 2014)	Brazil	novel, short story, journalism, children's literature, essay	
2009	centro	Arménio Vieira (born 1941)	Cape Verde	poetry, journalism	
2010	centro	Ferreira Gullar (1930 – 2016)	Brazil	poetry, short story, essay, art criticism, biography	
2011		Manuel António Pina (1943 – 2012)	Portugal	poetry, children's literature, drama, short story, journalism	
2012		Dalton Trevisan (1925 – 2024)	Brazil	short story	
2013	centro	Mia Couto (born 1955)	Mozambique	novel, short story, poetry	
2014	centro	Alberto da Costa e Silva (1931 – 2023)	Brazil	history, poetry, memoirs, essay, biography	
2015		Hélia Correia (born 1949)	Portugal	novel, children's literature, drama, poetry	
2016	centro	Raduan Nassar (born 1935)	Brazil	short story, novel	
2017	centro	Manuel Alegre (born 1936)	Portugal	poetry, novel	
2018	centro	Germano Almeida (born 1945)	Cape Verde	novel	
2019	centro	Chico Buarque (born 1944)	Brazil	songwriting, novel, drama	
2020		Vítor Manuel de Aguiar e Silva (born 1939)	Portugal	essay	
2021		Paulina Chiziane (born 1955)	Mozambique	novel	
2022		Silviano Santiago (born 1936)	Brazil	novel, essay, literary criticism	
2023		João Barrento (born 1940)	Portugal	translation, essay	
2024		Adélia Prado (born 1935)	Brazil	poetry	
2025		Ana Paula Tavares (born 1952)	Angola	poetry	
2026		Lídia Jorge (born 1946)	Portugal	novel, essay	

== Winners by country ==
Country	Laureates	First awarded
Portugal	16	1989
Brazil	15	1990
Mozambique	3	1991
Angola	3	1997
Cape Verde	2	2009
