= João Artur da Silva =

Portuguese artist

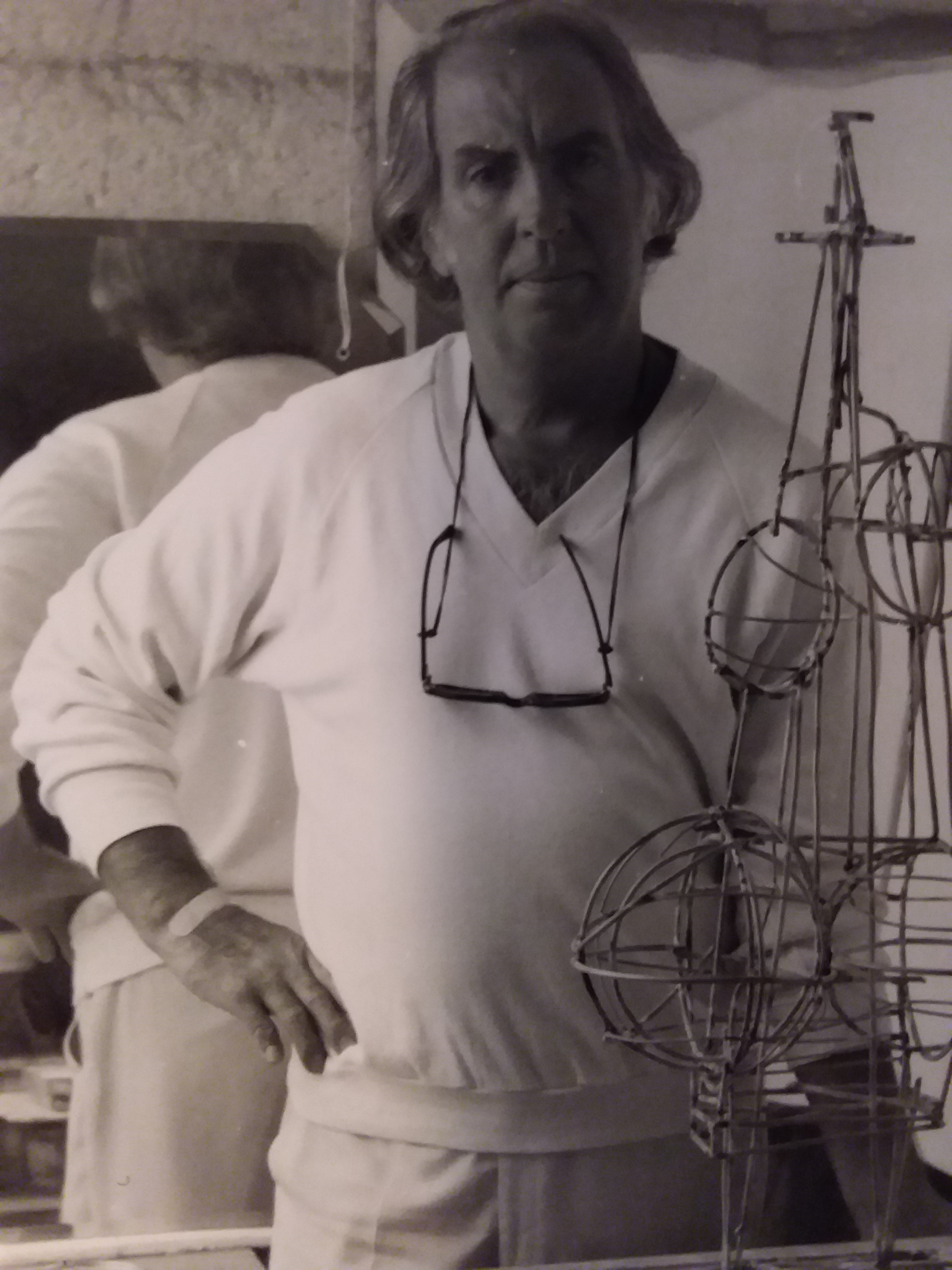
- Born: 5 October 1928 (age 97); Cascais, Portugal
- Spouses: Maria de Lourdes (m. 1953; div. 1958); Gillian Evans (m. 1962; div. 1969); Raymonde da Silva (m. 1978; died 2017)

João Artur da Silva is a Portuguese born artist and photographer currently living in British Columbia, Canada.

== Biography ==
João Artur Cordeiro Da Silva was born October 5, 1928 in Monte Estoril, Portugal. Son to Alfredo Lopes Da Silva, a businessman and Georgina Cordeiro, the first female sculptor in the Lisbon Arts Academy. He grew up in Cascais, attending the private British international St. Julian's School. At age 18, instead of joining his father's business, João Artur began drawing and painting. In the late 1940s, after participating in a number of collective art shows in Lisbon, he was introduced to Mario Cesariny, Cruzeiro Seixas and Antonio Maria Lisboa of the Lisbon Surrealist Group (Os Surrealistas) by Mario-Henrique Leiria. Because of these connections, João Artur’s work was shown at the 1st Surrealist Exhibition in Lisbon in 1949. He continued to exhibit with the Lisbon Surrealist Group through 1953. Many of the artists in this group were openly critical of the Salazar regime and João Artur’s affiliation with them made it difficult for him to obtain a passport until 1958. When he was finally able to leave the country, João Artur took up residency southwest of Manchester in a Wilmslow estate. There, he spent two years working towards a solo exhibition of his sculptures and paintings at the Woodstock Gallery in London. In England, João Artur continued to exhibit at London’s Piccadilly Gallery, while pursuing new artistic mediums such as textiles. Some of his designs, which had been commissioned by Hull Stafford Ltd, were shown at the London Design Centre’s “Best Designs of 1960” exhibition. That same year, several of João Artur’s paintings and sculptures were shown as part of the renowned Art Alive! Exhibition,

At this time João Artur befriended Errol Jackson the husband of his co-exhibitor, artist Jeanette Jackson. Errol Jackson, the official photographer of sculptor Henry Moore's work, taught João Artur to photograph his own art, a practice he continues.

In 1978, after several years living and exhibiting abroad, João Artur moved back to Portugal. In 1981 he held his first ‘Open Studio’ in Lisbon where he mounted a retrospective of his work from the past 23 years.

In 2009 his sculpture “O Prisioneiro”, which is one of two of his works in the permanent collection of the Gulbenkian, was shown in both the UK and Portugal as part of a collaboration between the Tate Gallery, St. Ives and the Centro de Arte Moderna of the Gulbenkian Foundation.

Da Silva moved to British Columbia, Canada in 1991 and became a Canadian citizen in 2012. In 2023, at the age of 95 and after a lifetime of personally handling every detail of his career, he acquired his first agent. He is now represented exclusively by the Perve Gallery of Lisbon (pervegaleria.eu). In April 2024 he was featured at Art Vancouver Fair, his debut Canadian exhibition.

== Style ==
João Artur started his artistic practice working with oils and gouache. During his time in England, he began to incorporate waterproof ink which allowed him to achieve a layered effect reminiscent of stained glass window panes. This technique, which he continued to develop throughout his career, gives his paintings a geometric aesthetic.

His sculptural practice has also evolved over the years, beginning with a focus on linear form and its expressive interplay with space. By the 70’s these forms became more rounded and recognizably human, a tendency that remained consistent in his work from that point on. The human forms of João Artur’s later sculptures are in contrast to the de-populated land and cityscapes of his paintings.

Although João Artur began his career with the Lisbon Surrealists, his aesthetics are no longer aligned with typical surrealist techniques. Cruzeiro Seixas himself has admired his technical power in the change from sweetly curvilinear to angular, almost aggressive forms. In 1960, João Artur caught the attention of the esteemed art critic, Eric Newton, who praised the sculptor and painter for his well-constructed works "based on sharp-edged triangles ingeniously interwoven and furnished with pleasantly variegated and discreet harmonies... [whose] underlying mathematical structure has a certain tension"
