= Herberto Hélder =

Portuguese poet (1930–2015)

Herberto Helder
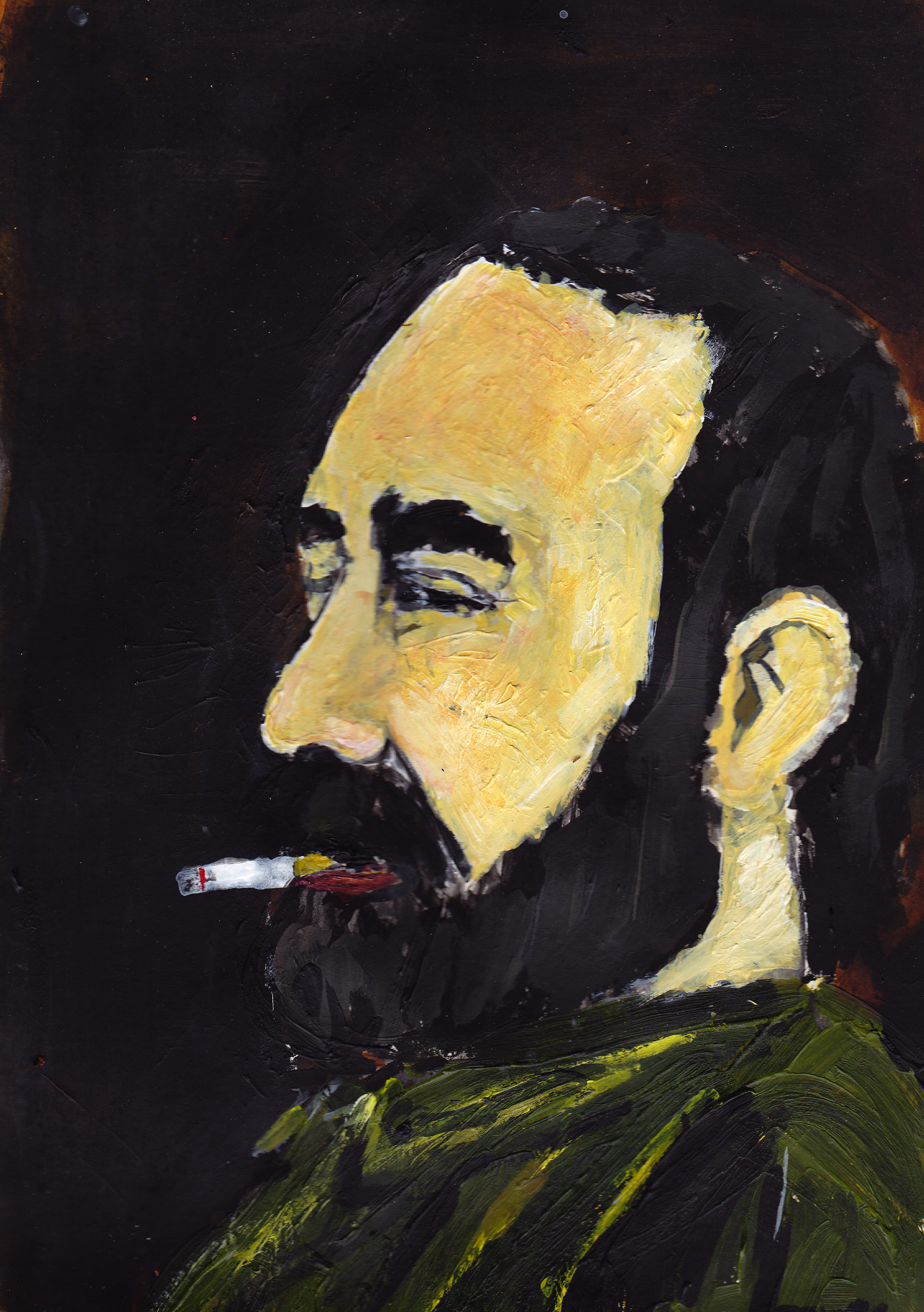
- Born: Herberto Helder de Oliveira; 23 November 1930; Funchal, Madeira, Portugal
- Died: 23 March 2015 (aged 84); Cascais, Portugal
- Occupations: Poet, writer
- Spouse(s): Maria Ludovina Dourado Pimentel; Olga da Conceição Ferreira Lima
- Children: Gisela Ester Pimentel de Oliveira; Daniel Oliveira
- Writing career
- Period: 1958–2015
- Notable awards: Prémio P.E.N. Clube Português de Poesia (1983); Prémio da Crítica da Associação Portuguesa de Críticos Literários (1988); Pessoa Prize (1994)

Herberto Helder de Oliveira (Funchal, São Pedro, 23 November 1930 – Cascais, 23 March 2015) was a Portuguese poet often considered the most important Portuguese poet of the second half of the 20th century.

== Biography ==
Herberto Helder was born in the Portuguese Atlantic island of Madeira. In 1946 he traveled to Lisbon to complete his secondary studies and subsequently in 1948 moved to Coimbra to go into Law school. By 1949 he had transferred to the Humanities University to study Romance Philology but dropped out after three years without completing the course. After returning to Lisbon he took up several temporary jobs, getting in touch with a circle of artists and writers such as Mário Cesariny, Luiz Pacheco, João Vieira and Hélder Macedo. The group revolved around Surrealism, which would inform his early writings. In 1958, his first book, O Amor em Visita was published. Over the course of the following years, he traveled and lived in France, the Netherlands, and Belgium, taking menial jobs to survive.

In 1994, he was the winner of the Pessoa Prize, which he turned down, saying "Don't tell anyone and give the prize to someone else ..."

== Works ==
Herberto Helder's poetry and fiction is very visual, and has connections with Surrealism, still his style is difficult to define; he was a practitioner of experimental poetry and some call him an orphic or visionary poet (that somehow reminds Ezra Pound).

Considered one of the most important contemporary Portuguese poets his poetry is not yet enough studied by academics due to the obscurity of his personality itself (he refused to take literary prizes or have media exposure) and the complexity of his paradoxal work that has a strange enchantment.

== Published works ==
=== Poetry ===
- O Amor em visita (Love in visit), Lisbon, 1958
- A Colher na Boca (The spoon in the mouth), Lisbon, 1961
- Poemacto (Poemact), Lisbon, 1967
- Lugar (Place), Lisbon, 1962
- Electronicolirica (Electronicalyrics), Lisbon, 1964
- Húmus (Humus), Lisbon, 1967
- Retrato em movimento (Portrait in movement), Lisbon, 1967
- O bebedor nocturno (The nocturnal drinker), Lisbon, 1968
- O ofício cantante (The singing craft), Lisbon, 1968
- Cobra (Snake/Cobra), Lisbon, 1977
- Photomaton e Vox (Photomaton and Vox), Lisbon, 1979
- Poesia Toda (All Poetry), Lisbon, 1981
- A Cabeça entre as mãos (The head between the hands), Lisbon, 1982
- As Magias (1987)
- Última Ciência (1988)
- Do Mundo (1994)
- Poesia Toda (1º vol. de 1953 a 1966; 2º vol. de 1963 a 1971) (1973)
- Poesia Toda (1ª ed. em 1981)
- A Faca Não Corta o Fogo – Súmula & Inédita (2008)
- Ofício Cantante (2009)
- Servidões (2013)
- A Morte sem Mestre (2014)
- Poemas canhotos (2015) - Finished just before his death, published two months after the author's death.

=== Fiction ===
- Os passos em volta (The steps around), Lisbon, 1963
- Apresentação do rosto (Presentation of the face), Lisbon, 1968
