= Alexandre Maria Pinheiro Torres =

Portuguese writer, scholar, and literary critic

Alexandre Maria Pinheiro Torres (27 December 1923 – 3 August 1999) was a writer, scholar, and literary critic during the Portuguese neorealist movement.

Born in Amarente, Pinheiro Torres was educated at the University of Porto and the University of Coimbra. He was first published in 1950 and was a critic of neorealism in the 1960s. In 1965 he served on the panel awarding the Jury of the Fiction Award of the Portuguese Association of Writers to Luandino Vieira, who had been imprisoned by the Estado Novo regime for charges of terrorism. As a result Pinheiro Torres himself was arrested and held at the Cadeia do Aljube prison. He subsequently moved to Wales where he taught at the University of Cardiff, living in the city until his death in 1999 from a long illness at the age of 75.
