= António Maria Lisboa =

Portuguese surrealist poet (1928–1953)

- Born: 1 August 1928; Lisbon, Portugal
- Died: 11 November 1953 (aged 25); Lisbon, Portugal
- Occupation: Poet
- Known for: Surrealism

António Maria Lisboa (1 August 1928 – 11 November 1953) was a Portuguese surrealist poet.

== Life ==
Antônio Maria Lisboa was born on 1 August 1928 in Lisbon. He studied at the Ensino Téchnico. He formed a small surrealist group in 1947 with Pedro Oom and Henrique Risques Pereira. Mário Cesariny de Vasconcelos, João Artur da Silva and Figueiredo Sobral were also members of this group. He became a lasting friend of Cesariny. The two poets wrote Afixação Proibida (Display Prohibited), an important manifesto of Portuguese surrealism which initiated the movement in Portugal. Lisboa and Cesariny became the two leading surrealist poets in Portugal.

Lisboa spent two months in Paris starting in March 1949. This is probably where he came in contact with Hinduism, Egyptology and occult subjects. Lisboa's work contains elements of the occult and esoteric. His work expressed loneliness and an obsession with death in gaunt, ironic, and irreverent language. On his return to Lisbon, he collaborated in the Surrealist Exhibition with poems and drawings with strange titles. Antônio Maria Lisboa contracted tuberculosis, which proved fatal. He died in Lisbon on 11 November 1953, at 25.

== Works ==
- Afixação Proibida (1949);
- Erro Próprio (1950);
- Ossóptico (1952);
- Isso Ontem Único (Lisbon, 1953);
- A Verticalidade e a Chave (Lisbon, 1956);
- Exercícios sobre o Sonho e a Vigília de Alfred Jarry seguido de O Senhor Cágado e o Menino (Lisbon, 1958);
- Uma Carta: Estrela da Ilha em Puros Ministros (Lisbon, 1958)
- Poesia de António Maria Lisboa (org. Mário Cesariny, Lisbon, 1962)

== Sources ==
- "Antônio Maria Lisboa" (in Portuguese). Instituto Camões. 2001.
- "António Maria Lisboa". Wook (in Portuguese).
- "Clube dos Poetas Imortais: António Maria Lisboa (1928-1953)". aventar (in Portuguese). 2009-06-12.
- "Figueiredo Sobral". Itaú Cultural (in Portuguese).
- "Lisboa, António Maria". Enciclopedia (in Italian). Treccani, La Cultura Italiana.
