= Fernando Monteiro de Castro Soromenho =

Portuguese journalist and writer

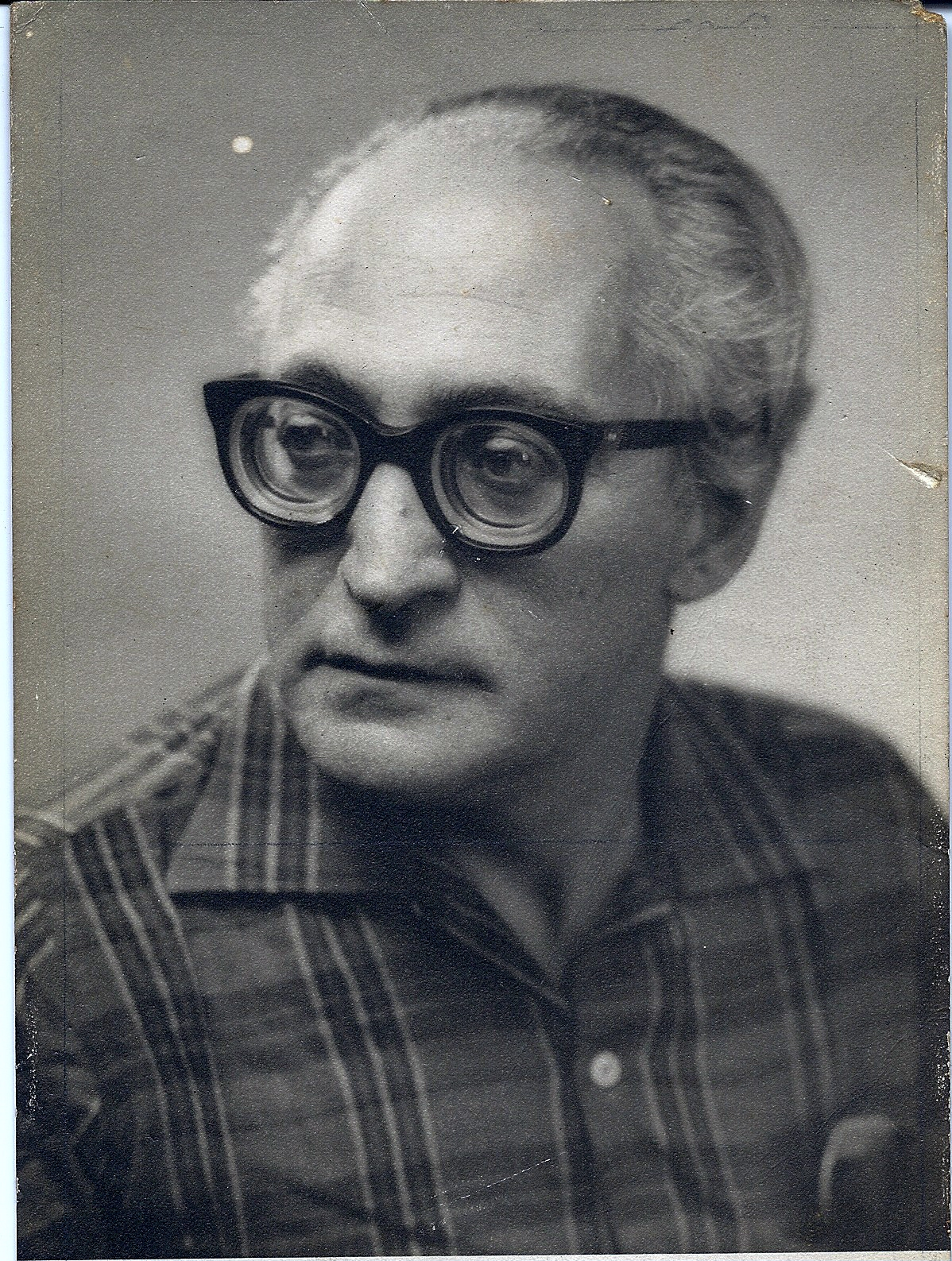
Fernando Monteiro de Castro Soromenho

Fernando Monteiro de Castro Soromenho (Chinde District, Mozambique, 31 January 1910 – São Paulo, 18 June 1968) was a Portuguese journalist and writer of fiction and ethnology. He is regarded both as a Portuguese neo-realist and a novelist of Angolan literature.

== Biography ==
Born in Mozambique, Castro Soromenho was the son of Artur Ernesto de Castro Soromenho, governor of Lunda, and Stela Fernançole de Leça Monteiro, a native of Porto from a Cape Verdean family. When he was one year old, they moved to Angola. Between 1916 and 1925, he attended primary and secondary school in Lisbon. He then returned to Angola, where he worked for an Angolan diamond company. Following that, he began an entry-level position in government administration, serving in the hinterlands in the eastern region of the colony. Later, he became an editor of the newspaper Diário de Luanda. In 1937 he returned to Lisbon where he worked at several newspapers such as Humanidade (the weekly edition of the Diário Popular), A Noite, Jornal da Tarde, O Século, Seara Nova, O Diabo, O Primeiro de Janeiro and Dom Casmurro. He also collaborated on an account of the Portuguese explorers in Africa, No. 12 of the magazine Mundo literário (1946–1948).

In 1949, he married Mercedes de la Cuesta in Argentina. As a consequence of having criticized the Salazar regime in Portugal, he was forced to leave for exile in France in 1960. He later went to the United States, where he taught at the University of Wisconsin for six months in 1961 and directed the program in Portuguese literature. He returned to France in August 1961 and worked at the magazines Présence Africane and Révolution. In December 1965, he went to live in Brazil, where he spent the rest of his life, teaching courses in the Faculty of Philosophy, Sciences and Humanities at the University of São Paulo and at the Faculty of Philosophy, Sciences and Humanities at Araraquara.

He also dedicated himself to the study of Angolan ethnography, having been one of the founders of the Center for African Studies at the University of São Paulo.

== Works ==
- Lendas negras (contos) (1936)
- Nhari: o drama da gente negra (contos e novelas) (1938)
- Imagens da cidade de S. Paulo de Luanda (1939)
- Noite de angústia (romance) (1939)
- Homens sem caminho (romance) (1941)
- Sertanejos de Angola (história) (1943)
- A aventura e a morte no sertão: Silva Pôrto e a viagem de Angola a Moçambique (história) (1943)
- Rajada e outras histórias (contos) (1943)
- A expedição ao país do oiro branco (história) (1944)
- Mistérios da terra (etnografia) (1944)
- Calenga (contos) (1945)
- A maravilhosa viagem dos exploradores portugueses (etnografia) (1946)
- Terra morta (romance) (1949)
- Samba (conto) (1956)
- A voz da estepe (conto) (1956)
- Viragem (romance) (1957)
- Histórias da terra negra (contos, novelas e uma narrativa) (1960)
- Portrait: Jinga, reine de Ngola et de Matamba (1962)
- A chaga (romance) (1970)

== Bibliography ==
- Literatura Portuguesa no Mundo (Porto Editora, ISBN 972-0-01252-8).
- Grande Enciclopédia Universal (Durclub, S.A. – Correio da Manhã, ISBN 84-96330-18-4).
- A Enciclopédia (Editorial Verbo – Jornal Público, ISBN 972-22-2308-9)
- Bastide, R. L´Afrique dans l´œuvre de Castro Soromenho
- Beirante, C. Castro Soromenho - um escritor intervalar (Lisboa, 1989)
- Moser, G. M. Castro Soromenho, an Angolan realist. In: Essays in Portuguese literature (1969)
- Mourão, Fernando A. A. A sociedade angolana através da literatura (São Paulo, 1978)
- Mourão, Fernando A. A. e QUEMEL, Maria A. R. Contribuição a uma bio-bibliografia sobre Fernando Monteiro de Castro Soromenho (Centro de Estudos Africanos, Universidade de São Paulo, São Paulo - 1977)

== See also ==
- Portuguese literature
