= Alice Sant'Anna =

Brazilian poet

Alice Sant'Anna (born May 24, 1988 in Rio de Janeiro) is a Brazilian poet, best known for her poetry books Dobradura (2007), Pingue-pongue (2012), Rabo de baleia (2013), and Pé do ouvido (2016). She was awarded the Associação Paulista de Críticos de Arte award in 2013.
