= Carlos de Oliveira =

Portuguese poet and novelist (1921 - 1981)

- Born: Carlos de Oliveira; August 10, 1921; Belém, Pará, Brazil
- Died: July 1, 1981 (aged 59); Lisbon, Portugal
- Occupations: Poet, writer
- Writing career
- Period: 1933–1981
- Literary movement: Neorealism

Carlos de Oliveira, GOSE (10 August 1921 – 1 July 1981), was a Portuguese poet and novelist.

== Biography ==
He was born in Belém, Brazil, to a Portuguese family which moved back to Portugal in 1923. They settled in Cantanhede, in the small village of Nossa Senhora das Febres, where his father practiced medicine. In 1933 he moves to Coimbra, where he will stay for 15 years, in order to complete his studies. He graduates from the University of Coimbra in history and philosophy in 1947.

The following year he settles definitively in Lisbon. In 1949 he marries Ângela, whom he had met at the university and was from Madeira, who will become his constant companion and collaborator.

He died in his home in Lisbon on 1 July 1981.

== Writings ==
In 1942 he published his first book of poems Tourism, with illustrations by Fernando Namora, as part of the Novo Cancioneiro collection and in 1943 published his first novel Casa na Duna. In 1944, the novel Alcateia is seized by the censorship of the Estado Novo regime, and the same year is released the second edition of Casa na Duna.

In 1945 he publishes a new book of poems, Mãe Pobre. 1945 and the subsequent years will be very fruitful for Carlos de Oliveira, with his participation in the Seara Nova and Vértice magazines and collaboration on the book by Fernando Lopes Graça Marchas, Danças e Canções - a collection of poems by various poets, with compositions by Lopes Graça, songs that came to be known as "heroic".

In 1953 publishes Uma Abelha na Chuva, his fourth novel, and universally acknowledged as one of the most important works of Portuguese literature, being integrated into the syllabus of the course of Portuguese in secondary schools.

In 1957 he organized, with José Gomes Ferreira, an approach to the Portuguese popular imagination with the two volumes of Contos Tradicionais Portugueses, some of which were later adapted to film by João César Monteiro.

In 1968 he published two new books of poetry, Sobre o Lado Esquerdo and Micropaisagem and collaborates with Fernando Lopes in the film adaptation of Uma Abelha na Chuva, completed in 1971. He published in 1971 O Aprendiz de Feiticeiro, a collection of articles and chronicles, and Entre Duas Memórias, a poetry book. In 1976 he gathers all his poetry in Trabalho Poético, two volumes, which presents his previous books, reviewed, and unpublished poems of Pastoral, book to be published separately the following year. Publishes in 1978 his last novel, Finisterra.

He is counted amongst the neorealist poets. He is one of the greatest poets of the 20th century combining social intervention (Neorealism) with reflection about the creative process of writing. His writing is dense and accurate (Mãe Pobre, 1945, Entre Duas Memórias, 1971). Regarding the novels, he goes from pure neo realism (Casa na Duna, 1943) to the sobriety of the sentiment and the protest (Uma Abelha na Chuva, 1953), ending with the complex (Finisterra, 1978).

He died in Lisbon, aged 59.

== Published works ==
Poetry:

- Turismo (1942)
- Mãe Pobre (1945)
- Descida aos Infernos (1949)
- Terra de Harmonia (1950)
- Cantata (1960)
- Sobre o Lado Esquerdo (1968)
- Micropaisagem (1969)
- Entre Duas Memórias (1971)
- Pastoral (1977)
- Trabalho Poético (1977–78)

Fiction:

- Casa na Duna (1943)
- Alcateia (1944)
- Pequenos Burgueses (1948)
- Uma Abelha na Chuva (1953)
- Finisterra (1978)

Chronicle:

- O Aprendiz de Feiticeiro (1971)

His works were translated to English, French, German, Italian, Spanish, and Russian.
