= Pedro Kilkerry =

Brazilian writer

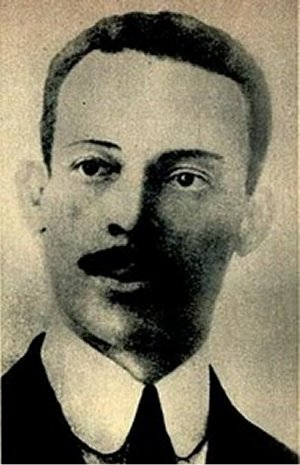
- Born: Pedro Militão dos Santos Kilkerry; March 10, 1885; Santo Antônio de Jesus, Brazil
- Died: March 25, 1917 (aged 32); Salvador, Brazil
- Occupation(s): Poet, journalist
- Parent(s): John Kilkerry; Salustiana do Sacramento Lima

Pedro Militão dos Santos Kilkerry (March 10, 1885 – March 25, 1917) was a Brazilian journalist and Parnassian/Symbolist poet.

He was born in Santo Antônio de Jesus, in the state of Bahia, on March 10, 1885. His father, John Kilkerry, was an Irish engineer, and his mother, Salustiana do Sacramento Lima, was a freed Afro-Brazilian slave. Poor and bohemian, details about Kilkerry's life are very sparse, but it is known that he wrote some poems and articles for newspapers such as Os Anais and A Nova Cruzada before dying prematurely due to tuberculosis. He never published any book during his lifetime.

His work remained forgotten for many years, until it was rediscovered in the 1950s by Brazilian essayist and literary critic Andrade Muricy. Augusto de Campos would praise Kilkerry in his 1970 work (Re)Visão de Kilkerry as a forerunner of the Modernist poetry in Brazil.

Singer Adriana Calcanhotto set Kilkerry's poem "O Verme e a Estrela" to music; it is present in her 1994 album A Fábrica do Poema.
