= António Diniz da Cruz e Silva =

António Diniz da Cruz e Silva (4 July 1731 in Lisbon – 5 October 1799 in Rio de Janeiro) was a Portuguese magistrate and heroic-comic poet, son of a Lisbon carpenter who emigrated to the Portuguese colony of Brazil shortly before the poet's birth, leaving his wife to support and educate her young family by the earnings of her needle.

== Education ==
Diniz studied Latin and philosophy with the Oratorians, and in 1747 matriculated at Coimbra University, where he wrote his first verses about 1750. In 1753 he took his degree in law, and returning to the capital, devoted much of the next six years to literary work.

== Career ==
In 1756 he became one of the founders and drew up the statutes of the Arcádia Lusitânia, a literary society whose aims were the instruction of its members, the cultivation of the art of poetry, and the restoration of good taste. The fault was not his if these ends were not attained, for, taking contemporary French authors as his models, he contributed much, both in prose and verse, to its proceedings, until he left in February 1760 to take up the position of juiz de fora at Castelo de Vide.

On returning to Lisbon for a short visit, he found the Arcádia a prey to the internal dissensions that caused its dissolution in 1774, but succeeded in composing them, and in 1764 he went to Elvas to act as auditor of one of the regiments stationed there. During a ten years residence, his wide reading and witty conversation gained him the friendship of the governor of that fortress and the admiration of a circle comprising all that was cultivated in Elvas. As inmost cathedral and garrison towns, the clerical and military elements dominated society, and here were mutually antagonistic, because of the enmity between their respective leaders, the bishop and, the governor. Moreover, Elvas, being a remote provincial centre, abounded in curious and grotesque types. Diniz, who was a keen observer, noted these, and, treasuring them in his memory, reproduced them, with their vanities, intrigues and ignorance, in his masterpiece, Hyssope.

In 1768 a quarrel arose between the bishop, a proud, pretentious prelate, and the dean, as to the right of the former to receive holy water from the latter at a private side door of the cathedral, instead of at the principal entrance. The matter being one of principle, neither party would yield what he considered his rights, and it led to a lawsuit, dividing the town into two sections, which eagerly debated the arguments on both sides and enjoyed the ridiculous incidents which accompanied the dispute. Ultimately the dean died, and was succeeded by his nephew, who appealed to the crown with success and the bishop lost his pretension. The Hyssope arose out of and deals with this affair. It was dictated in seventeen days, in the years 1770 to 1772, and, in its final redaction, consists of eight cantos of blank verse. The pressure of absolutism left open only one form of expression, satire, and in this poem Diniz produced an original work which ridicules the clergy and the prevailing Gallomania, and contains episodes full of humour. It has been compared with Boileau's Lutrin, because both are founded on a petty ecclesiastical quarrel, but here the resemblance ends, and the poem of Diniz is the superior in everything except metrification.

Returning to Lisbon in 1774, Diniz endeavoured once more to resuscitate the Arcádia, but his long absence, had withdrawn its chief support, its most talented members Garção and Quita were no more, and he only assisted at its demise. In April 1776 he was appointed desembargador of the court of Relação in Rio de Janeiro and given the habit of Aviz. He lived in Brazil, devoting his leisure to a study of its natural history and mineralogy, until 1789, when he went back to Lisbon to take up the post of desembargador of the Relação of Porto; in July 1790 he was promoted, and became desembargador of the Casa da Suplicação. In this year he was sent again to Brazil to assist in trying the leaders of the Republican conspiracy in Minas, in which Gonzaga and other men of letters were involved, and in December 1792 he became chancellor of the Relação in Rio. Six years later he was named councillor of the Conselho Ultramarino, but did not live to return home, dying in Rio on 5 October 1799.

== Description ==
Diniz possessed a poetic temperament, but his love of imitating the classics, whose spirit he failed to understand, fettered his muse, and he seems never to have perceived that mythological comparisons and pastoral allegories were poor substitutes for the expression of natural feeling. The conventionalism of his art prejudiced its sincerity, and, inwardly cherishing the belief that poetry was unworthy of the dignity of a judge, he never gave his real talents a chance to display themselves. His Anacreontic odes, dithyrambs and idylls earned the admiration of contemporaries, but his Pindaric odes lack fire, his sonnets are weak, and his idylls have neither the truth nor the simplicity of Quita's work. As a rule Diniz's versification is weak and his verses lack harmony, though the diction is beyond cavil.

== Published works ==
His poems were published in 6 vols. (Lisbon, 1807–1817). The best edition of Hyssope, to which Diniz owes his fame, is that of J. R. Coelho (Lisbon, 1879), with an exhaustive introductory study on his life and writings. A French prose version of the poem by Jean François Boissonade de Fontarabie has gone through two editions (Paris, 1828 and 1867), and English translations of selections have been printed in the Foreign Quarterly Review, and in the Manchester Quarterly (April 1896). See also Dr Teófilo Braga, A. Arcadia Lusitana (Oporto, 1899).
