= Pedro Correia Garção =

Portuguese lyric poet

Pedro António Joaquim Correia da Serra Garção (29 April 1724 – 10 November 1772) was a Portuguese lyric poet.

== Biography ==
Garção was born in Lisbon, Socorro, the son of Filipe Correia da Serra or Correia da Silva, born in São João do Souto, Braga, and baptized in 1697, a Nobleman of the Royal Household, Knight of the Order of Christ and Familiar of the Holy Office of the Portuguese Inquisition of Coimbra, who held an important post in the foreign office; his mother Luísa Maria da Visitação Dorgier Garção de Carvalho, born in Lisbon, São José, and baptized on 18 July 1699, was of French descent.

The poet's health was frail, and after going through a Jesuit school in Lisbon and learning English, French and Italian at home, he proceeded in 1742 to the University of Coimbra with a view to a legal career. He took his degree in 1748, and two years later was created a Knight of the Order of Christ. In 1751 his marriage in Lisbon, Santa Justa, with Maria Ana Xavier Froes Mascarenhas de Sande Salema, born c. 1725, by whom he had one son, brought him a rich dowry which enabled him to live in ease and cultivate letters; but in later years a lawsuit reduced him to poverty. He managed, however, to become a Nobleman of the Royal Household like his father.

From 1760 to 1762 he edited the Lisbon Gazette. In 1756, in conjunction with Cruz e Silva and others, Garção founded the Arcádia Lusitana to reform the prevailing bad taste in literature, identified with Seicentismo, which delighted in conceits, windy words and rhetorical phrases. The Arcádia fulfilled its mission to some extent, but it lacked creative power, became dogmatic, and ultimately died of inanition. Garção was the chief contributor to its proceedings, bearing the name of Corydon Erimantheo, and his orations and dissertations, with many of his lyrics, were pronounced and read at its meetings.

In the midst of his literary activity and growing fame, he was arrested on the night of April 9, 1771, and committed to prison by Pombal, whose displeasure he had incurred by his independence of character. The immediate cause of his incarceration would appear to have been his connection with a love intrigue between a young friend of his and the daughter of a Colonel Elsden, but he was never brought to trial, and the matter must remain in doubt. After much solicitation, his wife obtained from the king an order for her husband's release on November 10, 1772, but it came too late. Broken by infirmities and the hardships of prison life, Garção expired that very day in the Limoeiro prison, at the age of forty-eight.

== Works and style ==
Taking Horace as his model, supported by his background of scholarship and wide reading, Garção set out to raise and purify the standard of poetic taste. His verses are characterized by a classical simplicity of form and expression. His sonnets and sodales reveal his personality; his odes and epistles reveal an inspired poet and a man chastened by suffering. His two comedies in hendecasyllables, the Theatro Novo (played in January 1766) amid the Assemblea, are satires on the social life of the capital; and in the Cantata de Dido, included in the latter piece, the spirit of Greek art is allied to the perfection of form, making this composition much-admired among Portuguese 18th century poetry.

Garção wrote little and spent much time on the labor limae. His works were published posthumously in 1778, and the most complete and accessible edition is that of António José Saraiva, Obras completas, 2 vols. (Lisbon, 1957–58; reprinted 1982). An English version of the Cantata de Dido appeared in the academy (January 19, 1895).

See Innocencio da Silva, Diccionario bibliographico Portuguez, vol. vi. pp. 386–393, and vol. xvii. pp. 182–184; also Teófilo Braga, A Arcadia Lusitana (Porto, 1899).
