= Aurelino Costa =

Portuguese poet

Aurelino Costa (born 1956) is a Portuguese poet, diseur, and lawyer born in Argivai, Póvoa de Varzim.

Costa graduated from the Faculty of Law of the University of Coimbra.

== Work ==
- Poesia Solar (1992)
- Na Raiz do Tempo (2000)
- Pitões das Júnias – Tões de Aurelino Costa com Anxo Pastor-(2002);
- Amónio (2003); 2ª edição (bilingue, castelhano-português), tradução de Silvia Zayas, ed. Amalaya, León 2007
- Na Terra de Genoveva (2005)
- Domingo no Corpo (2013)

. GADANHA, Ed. Modo de Ler, 2019.

. Pitões das Júnias - Tões de Aurelino Costa, Ilustrações de Anxo Pastor, 2ª ed. Bluebook, 2020
