= Teodomiro Leite de Vasconcelos =

Mozambican journalist and writer

Teodomiro Alberto Azevedo Leite de Vasconcelos (Arcos de Valdevez, Portugal, 4 August 1944 – Johannesburg, South Africa, 29 January 1997) was a Mozambican journalist and writer. He was a member of Associação dos Escritores Moçambicanos.

In 1945, he moved to Mozambique, where he took later the Mozambican citizenship. He spent his childhood in Beira and studied Social Sciences in Lourenço Marques. He worked for Rádio do Aeroclube da Beira and Rádio Clube de Moçambique, and in 1972, he moved to Portugal because of his positions against the colonial regime. In Portugal, he worked for Rádio Renascença.

He moved back to Mozambique after the independence of the country and worked as a journalist for the radio and several publications. Besides, he worked as a teacher and he was actor and political commentator. From 1981 to 1988, he was the administrator of Rádio Moçambique.

== Works ==
- Irmão do Universo, Maputo, Associação dos Escritores Moçambicanos, 1994
- Resumos, Insumos e Dores Emergentes, Maputo, Associação dos Escritores Moçambicanos, 1997
- Pela Boca Morre o Peixe, Maputo, Associação dos Amigos de Leite de Vasconcelos, 1999
- As Mortes de Lucas Tadeu, Coimbra, Cena Lusófona, 2000 -
- A Nona Pata da Aranha, Maputo, Promédia, 2004

In 2001, Fernando Vendrell made a film based on his story O Gotejar da Luz.

== References and external links ==
- Ma-Schamba.com)
- PoetsOfMozambique.com www.poetsofmozambique.com
