= Manuel António Pina =

Portuguese journalist and writer

Manuel António Pina ComIH (18 November 1943 – 19 October 2012) was a Portuguese journalist and writer. In 2011 he was awarded the Prémio Camões, the most important literary award in the Portuguese language.

Pina was born in Sabugal, and died, aged 68, in Porto.

== Awards ==
- Camões Prize 2011
