= Theodemir (saint) =

Spanish monk

Saint Theodemir, martyr, patron of Carmona, was a Spanish Benedictine monk who died on July 25, 851, in Córdoba.

Saint Theodemir was born in Carmona, Seville, although his date of birth is unknown. The main source by which he is known is the Memorialis Sanctorum, published by his contemporary Saint Eulogius of Córdoba, who cites Theodimir as a young Carmonese monk.

Only scarce information is known about the life of this saint. However, it is known that at some point he left Carmona for Córdoba, attracted by the clerical environment there. He lived in the Monastery of Saint Zoilus as a Benedictine monk. Soon after he arrived at Córdoba, he was brought before the qadi, who sentenced him to lashings, punishment which turned to stabbing, and ended in his beheading. His remains are buried in the same convent he lived, the Monastery of Saint Zoilus.
