= José Gomes Ferreira =

Portuguese poet and fiction-writer

José Gomes Ferreira, GOSE, GOL (9 July 1900 – 1985) was a Portuguese poet and fiction writer with a vast work of varied influences. Gomes Ferreira was also a political activist who participated in the resistance against the dictatorship of Oliveira Salazar, becoming later a member of the Portuguese Communist Party. In the late 1970s he held the presidency of the Portuguese Writers Association.

A native of Porto, Ferreira graduated in law in 1924 and became a consul in Norway in the late 1920s. Soon after, he became a journalist and published his works in several progressive magazines. After the rise of the right-wing dictatorship led by Salazar, Ferreira he acquainted himself with the democratic resistance movements. During the later years of the regime, he continued publishing and saw his poetic work recognized by his peers. After the Carnation Revolution, Ferreira joined the Communist Party and continued his work until the mid-1980s.

His artistic work was representative of his concern with social problems, a mirror of his leftwing ideology. His poetry had varied influences, ranging from neorealism to surrealism, in a dialectic relation between his own ego and the need to share other people suffering.

== Biography ==
José Gomes Ferreira was born in Porto, in the north of Portugal, in 1900. When he was four years old his parents moved and settled in Lisbon. Ferreira made his early studies in the Camões High School, and soon started reading Portuguese literature, mainly Raul Brandão. After some time he became the director of a magazine titled Ressurreição (Resurrection), where he collaborated with one of the major names of the Portuguese literature, Fernando Pessoa.

Influenced by his father, a republican, Ferreira developed strong political ideas, and after completing the military service, he joined the Republican Academic Battalion, a republican organization created by university students in order to protect the young Portuguese Republic against monarchism.

He graduated in law in 1924. Soon after he became the Portuguese consul in Kristiansund, Norway. After the military coup of 1926, he returned and started working as a journalist, collaborating in several magazines, such as Presença, Seara Nova, Descobrimento, Imagem (a cinema magazine), Kino and others. He also became a translator, subtitling several films under the pseudonym of Álvaro Gomes.

José Gomes Ferreira's first book of poems, Lírios do Monte, was published in 1918, a work he would later classify as a childhood experience. In 1948 he published his first serious work, Poesia I. Fifteen years later his book Aventuras Maravilhosas de João Sem Medo would also confirm his credits among the younger readers, overwhelmed by a fable that arouses imagination and creativity.

He was born in a family with strong connections to music and started his musical studies when he was eight years old. He took part as a pianist and a mandolinist in the chamber group Quarteto Beethoven led by Manfredo Peixoto, for which he composed several waltzes, fados and variations. His better known piece was however the symphonic poem Idílio Rústico, first performed in 1918 by the Politeama Theatre Symphonic Orchestra under the direction of David de Sousa.

Due to his strong political positioning, Gomes Ferreira developed several contacts with the democratic resistance against the fascist regime of Salazar. He joined several democratic movements, including the communist influenced Movement of Democratic Unity. At the time, he worked along with other anti-fascist writers in composing several revolutionary songs, in a project coordinated by Fernando Lopes Graça. After publishing several works, both fiction and poetry, he was awarded the prestigious Big Prize of Poetry by the Portuguese Writers Society in 1962.

In the Carnation Revolution, a democratic revolution in 1974, Gomes Ferreira continued publishing and developing his work and in 1978 he was elected president of the Portuguese Writers Association. During the next year he made part of the electoral lists of the United People Alliance, a coalition of the Portuguese Communist Party with the Portuguese Democratic Movement. In that year, 1979, he officially joined the Communist Party. In 1981 he was awarded the Military Order of Sant'Iago de Espada by the President of the Republic, Ramalho Eanes.

In 1983 Gomes Ferreira submitted to surgery and would die two years later.

== Works ==
=== Poetry ===
- 1918 - Lírios do Monte
- 1921 - Longe
- 1946 - Marchas, Danças e Canções (collaboration)
- 1948 - Poesia I
- 1948 - Homenagem Poética a Gomes Leal (collaboration)
- 1950 - Líricas (collaboration)
- 1950 - Poesia II
- 1956 - Eléctico
- 1962 - Poesia III
- 1970 - Poesia IV
- 1973 - Poesia V
- 1978 - Poeta Militante I, II e III

=== Fiction ===
- 1960 - O Mundo Desabitado
- 1960 - O Mundo dos Outros - histórias e vagabundagens
- 1962 - Os segredos de Lisboa"
- 1963 - Aventuras Maravilhosas de João Sem Medo
- 1971 - O Irreal Quotidiano - histórias e invenções
- 1975 - Gaveta de Nuvens - tarefas e tentames literários
- 1976 - O sabor das Trevas - Romance-alegoria
- 1978 - Coleccionador de Absurdos
- 1978 - Caprichos Teatrais
- 1980 - O Enigma da Árvore Enamorada - Divertimento em forma de Novela quase Policial

=== Chronicles ===
- 1975 - Revolução Necessária
- 1977 - Intervenção Sonâmbula

=== Memories ===
- 1965 - A Memória das Palavras - ou o gosto de falar de mim
- 1966 - Imitação dos Dias - Diário Inventado
- 1980 - Relatório de Sombras - ou a Memória das Palavras II
- 1990 - Dias Comuns I: Passos Efémeros
- 1998 - Dias Comuns II: A Idade do Malogro
- 2000 - Dias Comuns III: Ponte Inquieta

=== Short story collections ===
- 1958 - Contos
- 1969 - Tempo Escandinavo

=== Translations ===
- ???? - La casa de Bernarda Alba by Federico García Lorca
- 1926 - The Book of One Thousand and One Nights
