= Theodemir (bishop of Mondoñedo) =

Bishop of Mondoñedo

Teodomirus of Dumium was a medieval Galician Bishop of Mondoñedo from 972 to 977.

Catholic Church titles
Preceded by Rodrigo	Bishop of Dumium; 972–977	Succeeded by Arias II
