= Urbano Tavares Rodrigues =

Portuguese politician (1923–2013)

- Tavares Rodrigues in 1966
- Born: Urbano Tavares Rodrigues; December 6, 1923; Lisbon, Portugal
- Died: August 9, 2013 (aged 89); Lisbon, Portugal
- Occupations: Poet, writer

Urbano Tavares Rodrigues, GCIH (December 6, 1923 – August 9, 2013) was a Portuguese professor of literature, a literary critic and a fiction writer, winner of many literary prizes.

== Life ==
Urbano Tavares Rodrigues was born in Lisbon on December 6, 1923, son of a family of large landowners of Moura, Alentejo. He attended primary school in Moura. After moving to Lisbon he joined the Camões Lyceum (Liceu Camões), where he was a fellow student of Luís Lindley Cintra and Antonio, brother of Vasco Gonçalves He graduated from the Faculty of Arts of the University of Lisbon, where he studied Romance Philology. He was a friend of Mário Soares from his youth, although they did not always agree over politics.

Rodrigues was an activist in opposition to the authoritarian Estado Novo regime, which made it difficult for him to find work as a teacher. He was always linked to the Portuguese Communist Party. He spent some time in prison in Caxias, and for a long period he was in exile in France. He met some of the intellectuals of the 1950s in Paris, including Albert Camus, who became a friend. He taught at the French universities of Montpellier, Aix and the Sorbonne in Paris. He moved back to Portugal after the return of freedom of expression and democracy in Portugal on April 25, 1974. In 1984 he obtained a PhD in Literature for a thesis on the work of Manuel Teixeira Gomes. In 1993 he retired from the Faculty of Arts of the University of Lisbon as a full professor.

Rodrigues wrote for various magazines and newspapers, including the Bulletin des Études Portugaises, Colóquio-Letras, Jornal de Letras, Vértice and Nouvel Ovservateur. He was director of the review Europa and theater critic for the journals O Século and Diário de Lisboa. He was a co-founder of the Minotauro publishing house with Figueiredo Sobral. This company published the Minotauro magazine. Rodrigues was a member of the Lisbon Academy of Science and the Academy of Brazilian Literature. He received various literary awards including the Prémio Ricardo Malheiros, the prizes of the International Association of Literary Critics and of the Cultural Press, and the grand prize of Conto Camilo Castelo Branco.

Urbano Tavares Rodrigues died at the Capuchin Hospital in Lisbon on August 9, 2013.

== Selected bibliography ==
=== Novels ===
- 1959 - Uma Pedrada no Charco
- 1961; 2003 - Os Insubmissos
- 1962; 1982 - Exílio Perturbado
- 1966; 1988 - Imitação da Felicidade
- 1967; 1974 - Despedidas de Verão
- 1968 - Tempo de Cinzas
- 1974; 1999 - Dissolução
- 1979; 1986 - Desta Água Beberei
- 1986; 1987 - A Vaga de Calor
- 1989 - Filipa nesse Dia
- 1991 - Violeta e a Noite
- 1993 - Deriva
- 1995 - A Hora da Incerteza
- 1997 - O Ouro e o Sonho
- 1998 - O Adeus à Brisa
- 2000 - O Supremo Interdito
- 2002 - Nunca Diremos quem sois
- 2006 - Ao contrário das Ondas

=== Travels ===
- 1949 - Santiago de Compostela
- 1956 - Jornadas no Oriente
- 1958 - Jornadas na Europa
- 1963 - De Florença a Nova Iorque
- 1973 - Viagem à União Soviética e Outras Páginas
- 1973 - Redescoberta da França
- 1976 - Registos de Outono Quente
- 1999 - Agosto no Cairo: 1956

=== Essays ===
- 1950 - Manuel Teixeira Gomes
- 1954 - Présentation de castro Alves
- 1957 - O Tema da Morte na Moderna Poesia Portuguesa
- 1960; 1981 - O Mito de Don Juan
- 1960 - Teixeira Gomes e a Reacção Antinaturalista
- 1961 - Noites de Teatro
- 1962; 2001 - O Algarve na Obra de Teixeira Gomes
- 1964 - O Romance Francês Contemporâneo
- 1966; 1978 - O Tema da Morte: Ensaios
- 1966; 1978 - Realismo, Arte de Vanguarda e Nova Cultura
- 1968 - A Saudade na Poesia Portuguesa
- 1969 - Escritos Temporais
- 1971; 2001 - Ensaios de Escreviver
- 1977 - Ensaios de Após-Abril
- 1980 - O Gosto de Ler
- 1981 - Um Novo Olhar sobre o Neo-Realismo
- 1984 - Manuel Teixeira Gomes: O Discurso do Desejo
- 1993 - A Horas e Desoras
- 1994 - Tradição e ruptura
- 1995 - O Homem sem Imagem
- 2001 - O Texto sobre o Texto
- 2003 - A Flor da Utopia

== Sources ==
- Agência Lusa (2013-08-09). "O corpo de Urbano Tavares Rodrigues será velado a partir das 19:00 na Sociedade Portuguesa de Autores, em Lisboa". Jornal i (in Portuguese).
- Biografia de Figueiredo Sobral (in Portuguese), Galeria Sesimbra, 1999
- "Figueiredo Sobral". Itaú Cultural (in Portuguese). Archived from the original on 2015-04-02.
- Lusa – Agência de Notícias de Portugal, SA (28 April 2010). "Biblioteca Nacional adquiriu espólio do escritor Urbano Tavares Rodrigues". Público (Portugal) (in Portuguese). Archived from the original on 20 May 2011.
- Isabel Lucas; Isabel Coutinho; Sérgio C. Andrade; Catarina Moura (2013-08-09). "Morreu Urbano Tavares Rodrigues, um humanista da escrita". Público (in Portuguese).
