= João-Maria Nabais =

Portuguese doctor and writer

João-Maria Nabais is a Portuguese doctor and writer, noted as an expert in the history of medicine, history of sephardic medical doctors and for his poetry.

== Background ==
Nabais graduated in medicine and surgery from the Faculty of Medicine in the University of Lisbon in 1974. He works as a Hospital Assistant in Paediatrics and takes a post as a member of the Department of Child Psychiatry in Barreiro.

== Research interests ==
The scientific interests of Nabais are: history of health sciences, history of medicine, medical literature and writers. Nabais has published more than a two hundred articles and essays.

He has made numerous presentations on the History of Medicine and Judaism, and has presented papers at national and international meetings.

He has been distinguished in literary contests: António Patrício Poetry Awards in 1996, 2002 and 2006 by the Portuguese Society of Writers and Artistic Doctors, for the books Poemas, Sons de Urbanidade and O Lugar e o Mito. He received the Merit Cultural Award of the Association of Medical Writers and Journalists of Bucharest, Romania in 2004. He was awarded the Moldarte Award in painting in 1987.

== Work in poetry (books) ==
- 1992 – O Silêncio das Palavras
- 1996 – Crepúsculo das Noites Breves
- 1997 – Instantes e Vivências
- 1997 – Poemas
- 1998 – Novos Navegantes (Note: with a CD.)
- 2000 – Memórias de Amor e Sedução
- 2001 – Cidade dos Rios
- 2001 – Sons de Urbanidade
- 2002 – Espírito do Vento
- 2002 – Monsaraz
- 2002 – Palhais
- 2002 – Criança, um Tempo de Fuga
- 2003 – Interior à Luz
- 2005 – O Lugar e o Mito
- 2007 – Terra de Húmus e Neblinas
