= Mário-Henrique Leiria =

Portuguese poet

Mário-Henrique Leiria (1923–1980) was a Portuguese surrealist poet. Born in Lisbon, he studied at the Escola de Belas Artes. He and his fellow surrealists were involved in an absurdist plot to overthrow the dictatorship of Antonio Salazar. He is best known for his books Contos do Gin-Tonic (Gin and Tonic Tales, 1973) and Novos Contos do Gin (More Gin Tales, 1974). He died in 1980.
