= Mário Cesariny de Vasconcelos =

Portuguese poet (1923–2006)

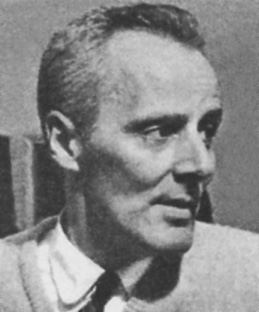
Mário Cesariny de Vasconcelos

Mário Cesariny de Vasconcelos or Mário Cesariny (August 9, 1923 – November 26, 2006) was a Portuguese surrealist poet and painter. He published several major works of poetry during a career spanning 50 years. Cesariny was also a painter, but his work became more centered on poetry in the 1950s.

== Early life ==
Mário Cesariny was born in Lisbon, Portugal, the youngest child and only son of Viriato de Vasconcelos and María de las Mercedes Cesariny, a Spaniard of French but originally Italian ancestry.

== Education ==
Mário Cesariny studied in the prestigious Escola de Artes Decorativas António Arroio and also studied music with the composer Fernando Lopes Graça. Later he joined the Académie de la Grande Chaumière in Paris, where he met André Breton in 1947. He soon became influenced by the French surrealist movement and was one of the biggest supporters of the movement in Portugal, where he founded the Lisbon Surrealist Movement with other Portuguese artists including Alexandre O'Neill and José-Augusto França and where he met João Artur da Silva.

After being acquainted with the surrealist movement, Cesariny moved away from the neorealist movement, important at the time in the country for being composed mainly by members of the resistance against the fascist leaning regime of Oliveira Salazar. He adopted an attitude of constant experimenting in his work. This principle is the main characteristic of his work and has been present throughout his career.

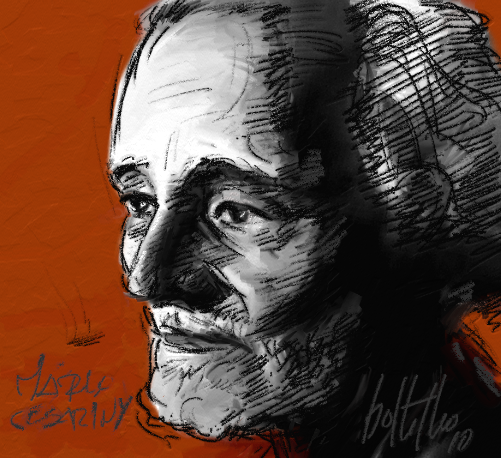
Mário Cesariny, painting by Bottelho

From 1960 until April 25, 1974, Cesariny was mercilessly harassed by the Portuguese Polícia Judiciária for being a suspect of vagrancy, a euphemistic term used by the police in those days for homosexuality, which the poet lived courageously in spite of persecution. This fact shows up several times in his writings in a veiled way ("Lisboa-os-Sustos") and was one of the reasons for his intermittent stays in Great Britain and France during the 1960s and 1970s. Later he talked publicly about this.

== Works ==
- 1950 — Corpo Visível
- 1952 — Discurso sobre a Reabilitação do Real Quotidiano
- 1953 — Louvor e Simplificação de Álvaro de Campos
- 1956 — Manual de Prestidigitação
- 1957 — Pena Capital
- 1958 — Alguns Mitos Maiores e Alguns Mitos Menores Postos à Circulação pelo Autor
- 1959 — Nobilíssima Visão
- 1961 — Poesia
- 1961 — Planisfério e Outros Poemas
- 1964 — Um Auto para Jerusalém
- 1965 — Titânia e A Cidade Queimada
- 1972 — Burlescas, Teóricas e Sentimentais
- 1980 — Primavera Autónoma das Estradas
- 1994 — xacara das 10 meninas
