= Maria de Lourdes Belchior Pontes =

Portuguese writer and diplomat

Her Excellency Maria de Lourdes Belchior
- Born: Maria de Lourdes Belchior Pontes; 9 July 1923; Lisbon, Lisbon, Portugal
- Died: 4 June 1998 (aged 74); Lisbon, Portugal
- Occupations: Essayist; Writer; Diplomat; Minister of Culture; Academic

Maria de Lourdes Belchior Pontes • Großes Verdienstkreuz • GCRB • Officier • GCIH • ComSE • GCIP • (9 July 1923 - 4 June 1998), was a Portuguese writer, poet, professor, and diplomat who lived in Portugal, Brazil, France and the United States of America.

== Early life ==
Born in Lisbon on the 9th of July 1923, the General Register Office switched the order of her last names, placing the maternal surname Pontes last, but she would become known by her paternal last name Belchior, as she thought it was appropriate.

Belchior attended the all-girls school, Maria Amália Vaz de Carvalho, where she became known as the “Carolina Micaelis” for her academic capacities.

In 1946, she graduated in romantic philology with a dissertation entitled “Da Poesia by Frei Agostinho da Cruz - Attempt at Stylistic Analysis.” After a short period teaching alongside Portuguese poet Sebastião da Gama in a local school, in 1947 she accepted a position offered by the Faculty of Arts of the University of Lisbon as Second Assistant.

== First woman to hold title at the University of Porto ==
Between 1950 and 1952, she was a Reader at the Catholic Institute of Paris. One year later she received her doctorate with a thesis on Frei António das Chagas - "A Man and a 17th Century Style" In 1959 she obtained the title of Extraordinary Teacher becoming the first woman to hold the position of Extraordinary Teacher ( Professor catedrático) the highest academic office in Portugal and Brazil. She was awarded the position through a competition in which she presented herself with a work on Rodrigues Lobo's Poetic Itinerary. All members of the jury, who were to remain in history as the biggest figures in contemporary Portuguese culture, decided in her favour. The jury included Vitorino Nemésio, Orlando Ribeiro, among other distinguished figures and was headed by Professor Marcello Caetano, future Prime Minister of Portugal during the last stage of the Estado Novo regime.

In 1969, she took on the position of Full Professor at University of Porto where she was the chair for the Portuguese Literature I (Middle Ages) at the Faculty of Literature for a year. Belchior was also involved with the Inter-University Centre for the History of Spirituality (CIUHE) based there.

== Portuguese Embassy in Brazil ==
Between 1963 and 1966, she served as Cultural Adviser at the Embassy of Portugal in Rio de Janeiro, accepting the position in order to promote a larger number of scholarships for cultural exchanges between Portuguese and Brazilian students, which she achieved through competitions.

During her time in Brazil she travelled extensively, holding conferences and guiding debates on issues of her speciality. Three years prior, Belchior had been the guest speaker alongside Jean-Paul Sartre and Simone de Beauvoir at the First Brazilian Congress of Critic and Literary History held in August 1960 in Recife.

== Presidency of Instituto Camões ==
She returned to Portugal in 1966, where she was first advisor to the board and later President (1970-1973) of Instituto Camões, formerly Instituto de Alta Cultura. During this time, she was made Full Professor at the University of Porto where she created the Department of Roman Philology at the Faculty of Arts of the University of Porto. In 1996, the university granted her an honoris causa doctorate.

== Co-founder of Nova University Lisbon ==
Also at this time, she was a member of the Founding Council of the Universidade Nova de Lisboa alongside Eduardo Lourenço and Luciana Stegagno Picchio, between 1973 and 1975, forming part of the cultural inner circle at the time in Portugal. She was a member of the Fulbright Commission, overseeing the administration of the Fulbright Program in 1974. Alongside Malaca Casteleiro, Lindley Cintra and Fernando Cristóvão, Maria de Lourdes formed part of the Commission responsible for creating the new Portuguese Language Orthographic Agreement of 1990. Years later, in May 1998, the university awarded her the honoris causa doctorate.

== Secretary of State for Culture ==
In the wake of the Carnation Revolution, Belchior was asked to form part of the new government. Between 15 May and 17 July 1974, she assumed the position of Secretary of State for Culture and Scientific Research. For a brief time it was noted that she was the only woman in the Portuguese government, then joined by Maria de Lourdes Pintasilgo also as Secretary of State. She rapidly chose to renounce all political appointments and went on to co-found a weekly publication, Nova Terra, signing as Director a large part of the editorials.

== Sorbonne ==
She moved to Paris in 1976, where she spent the academic year as associate professor at Sorbonne University.

== University of California ==
In 1978, Belchior was invited to replace the Portuguese writer and friend Jorge de Sena heading the Department of Spanish and Portuguese and presiding over the Jorge de Sena Center for Portuguese Studies at the University of California. She demonstrated her modesty once again by insisting on a salary below what her predecessor Jorge de Sena had earned. Maria de Lourdes for ten years led the teaching in the field of Lusophone literatures and cultures at the University of Santa Barbara, working alongside Frederick G. Williams.

== Director Calouste Gulbenkian Foundation ==
Seventeen years after having refused the position, Belchior finally accepted to replace José-Augusto França as Director of the Portuguese Cultural Center of the Calouste Gulbenkian Foundation in Paris.

She was Director from 1989 to 1998, during which she promoted the dissemination of Portuguese culture in France: she developed the foundation's library, promoted publications, held numerous exhibitions, subsidised the translation of Portuguese authors into French, and held events such as the tribute to the Brazilian writer and friend Jorge Amado (October 1990), the tribute to Emmanuel Nunes on the occasion of the Autumn Festival in Paris (November 1992), the debate with the architect Siza Vieira on the “reconstruction of Chiado after the 1989 fire” (January 1964) and the conference “Portugal in the work of António Tabucchi” (Marco of 1964), as well as nights of debate dedicated to the filmmaker Manoel de Oliveira, such as the exhibition of “Non ou a vã gloria de mandar”.

== Pope John Paul II ==
Belchior belonged to the secular Grail movement, a Christian-inspired movement, in the 1960s. In 1990 she was appointed by Pope John Paul II as a member of the Pontifical Council for Culture.

== Honours ==
She was awarded the degree of Commander of the Order of Rio Branco (1967), of the Order of Santiago da Espada (1971) and of the Order of Merit of the Federal Republic of Germany (1973); she was Grand Officer of the Order of Public Instruction (1973) and Officier of France's Légion d'honneur (1975); she was awarded the Europe Prize of the Académie de Marches de I'Est (1996) and the Grand Cross of the Order of Infante D. Henrique (1998).

She was also a member of the Hispanic Society in America (1970), the Latin Academy (1970) and the Lisbon Science Academy (1975).

== Cultural connections ==
The writer was closely associated with a broad network of influential figures across Portuguese, Brazilian, and French cultural spheres during the 20th century. Among these were notable Portuguese figures such as Maria de Lourdes Pintasilgo and Mário Soares, authors José Saramago, Sophia de Mello Breyner Andresen, Miguel Torga, Matilde Rosa Araújo, Sebastião da Gama, Jorge de Sena, Vitorino Nemésio and Ruy Belo, artists José de Almada Negreiros, Manuel Cargaleiro, composer Fernando Lopes-Graça, and historians Hernâni Cidade and Orlando Ribeiro.

From Brazil, she was close to Jorge Amado and Zélia Gattai, Marly de Oliveira, Domingos Carvalho da Silva, and João Guilherme de Aragão. The French intellectual scene included Árpád Szenes, Simone de Beauvoir and her sister Hélène de Beauvoir, along with Michel Chandeigne.

She was also connected with Lindley Cintra, David Mourão-Ferreira, Eduardo Lourenço, Antonio Tabucchi, Carlos Pinto Coelho, Lídia Jorge, Vergílio Ferreira, José Jorge Letria, Vasco Graça Moura, Nuno Júdice, Fernando Namora, Oliveira Marques, Cardinal Jean-Marie Lustiger, Maria Velho da Costa, Mário Dionísio, Helena Cidade Moura, Sommer Ribeiro, Jorge Silva Melo.

== Death ==
Her death, which occurred on June 4, 1998, was described by the president of the Calouste Gulbenkian Foundation, Ferrer Correia as "the loss of one of the most notable figures in Portuguese culture".

The City of Lisbon paid tribute to Belchior by giving her name to a street in Lisbon.

The estate of Belchior was largely donated by her sister, Maria Helena Pontes Belchior, in part to the National Library of Portugal and the University of Porto.

In the year of the centenary of her death, in 2023, several celebrations were held in Paris and Portugal. In Paris, on March 17, a study day took place at the Maison du Portugal André de Gouveia. The event was co-organized by the University of Paris Nanterre, Sorbonne Nouvelle, Sorbonne University, and Paris 8 University, in partnership with the Gulbenkian Foundation and Library.

In Portugal, the University of Porto organized, on December 11, the congress "Maria de Lourdes Belchior: the woman and the books," at the Faculty of Arts, with the participation of Inês Belchior, a relative of the honoree, and contributions from Ernesto Rodrigues, Guilherme d’Oliveira Martins, Arnaldo Saraiva, and José Adriano de Carvalho, among others. A volume titled Maria de Lourdes Belchior: a Mulher e os Livros, authored by several of the contributors present at the congress, was subsequently published in April 2026, further contributing to the study and dissemination of her work.

The National Library of Portugal, in Lisbon, also held a documentary exhibition on Maria de Lourdes Belchior, from December 20 to March 30, 2024.

== Publications ==
Belchior was the pioneer of stylistics in Portugal. She was particularly interested in the 16th and above all the 17th centuries, the baroque period, publishing Frei António das Chagas – um Homem e Um Estilo do Sec. XVIII (1953) and Itinerário Poético de Rodrigues Lobo (1959). The rehabilitation of the literary era is largely due to her work as a writer and scholar.

Of his essayist side, her works include O Estruturalismo (1968) and Os Homens e os Livros (1971) and joint works as diverse as Três ensaios sobre a obra de Manuel Fonseca, with Maria Alzira Seixo and Maria Rocheta; Leituras de Roland Barthes, with Maria Augusta Babo, or Antologia de Espirituais Portugueses, with José Carvalho.

Maria de Lourdes Belchior also wrote poetry, which Professor Fernando Martinho characterised as “A very direct, very colloquial poet” and in which she produced two books of poems, namely Gramática do Mundo (1985) and Cancioneiro para Nossa Senhora: Poemas para uma Via Sacra (1988).

The author's complete biography prepared by Ernesto Rodrigues of the University of Lisbon contains 248 publications.

The following volumes of studies were dedicated to the late Maria de Lourdes: O Amor das Letras e das Gentes. In Honor of Maria de Lourdes Belchior Pontes, edited by João Camilo dos Santos and Frederick G. Williams, Center for Portuguese Studies, University of California, Santa Bárbara, 1995; Romanesque. Revista de Literatura, 1/2, Lisboa, Cosmos, 1993; Archives of the Calouste Gulbenkian Cultural Center, XXXVII, Calouste Gulbenkian Foundation, Lisbon - Paris, 1998.
