= Árvore (magazine) =

- Discipline: Literary magazine
- Language: Portuguese
- Edited by: António Luís Moita; António Ramos Rosa; José Terra; Luís Amaro; Raul de Carvalho

Publication details
- History: 1951-1953

Standard abbreviations
- ISO 4: Árvore

Árvore ("Tree") was a Portuguese literary magazine, published in Lisbon between 1951 and 1953, in a total of four issues.

An independent publication with a specialization in poetry, Árvore was mainly focused on discussion and criticism, as well as on the dissemination of the poetry of young poets, critical reviews of poetic works, and essays "in defense of Poetry".

== Contributors ==
This magazine was directed and edited by António Luís Moita, António Ramos Rosa, José Terra, Luís Amaro and Raul de Carvalho.

Artistic collaborators included Cipriano Dourado, Lima de Freitas and Fernando Lanhas.

The magazine counted among its collaborators such writers as:

- Egito Gonçalves
- Eugénio de Andrade
- Sophia de Mello Breyner Andresen
- Maria Cristina Araújo
- Matilde Rosa Araújo
- Humberto d'Ávila
- José Bento
- René Char
- Carlos Eurico da Costa
- Luísa Dacosta
- Paul Éluard
- Adriano Lourenço de Faria
- Rogério Fernandes
- Armando Ventura Ferreira
- Vergílio Ferreira
- Manuel da Fonseca
- José-Augusto França
- Natércia Freire
- Sebastião da Gama
- Oliveira Guimarães
- Alberto de Lacerda
- Jorge de Lima
- Eduardo Lourenço
- Alfredo Margarido
- Albano Dias Martins
- Henri Michaux
- David Mourão-Ferreira
- Mário Sacramento
- Álvaro Salema
- Jorge de Sena
- Mário Cesariny de Vasconcelos
- Fernando Vieira
