= Camões Secondary School =

Coordinates: 38°43′48.8″N 9°8′36.2″W

Secondary School Luís de Camões
- Escola Secundária Luís de Camões
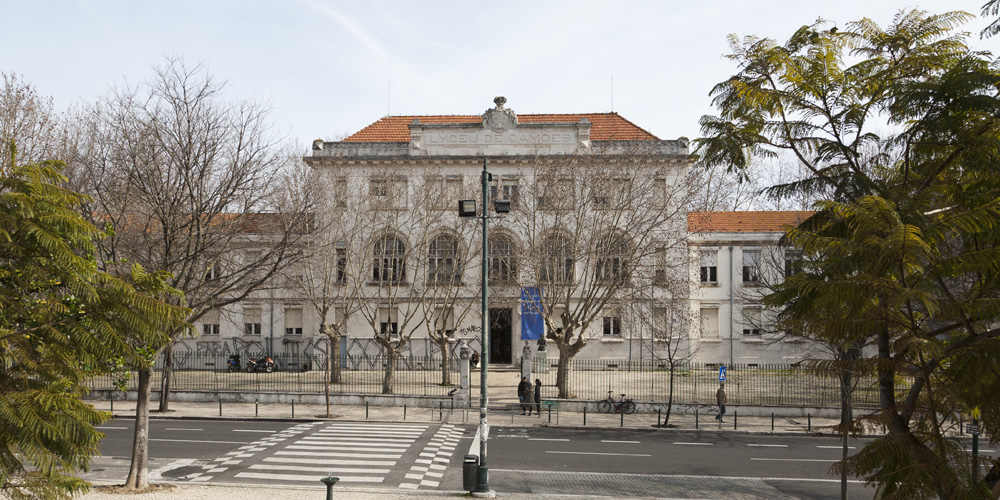
- The main facade of the secondary school
- Interactive map of the Secondary School Luís de Camões area

General information
- Type: Secondary School
- Location: Arroios, Lisbon, Portugal
- Opened: 20th century
- Owner: Eduardo Luz

Technical details
- Material: Masonry

Design and construction
- Architect: Miguel Ventura Terra

Website
- Official Site

The Secondary School Luís de Camões (Portuguese: Escola Secundária Luís de Camões) is a secondary school located in the civil parish of Arroios, in the municipality and Portuguese capital of Lisbon, classified as a Monumento de Interesse Público (Monument of Public Interest) in 2012.

Founded in 1902 and named after Portuguese poet Luís de Camões, it is one of the largest and most prestigious secondary schools in Lisbon, known for the many important Portuguese public figures who have attended it, including novelist António Lobo Antunes, current UN Secretary-General António Guterres and former President of the European Commission José Manuel Barroso.

== History ==
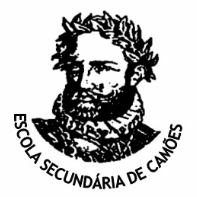
School coat-of-arms

At the beginning of the 20th century, and following the reform of the lyceum educational system by the Ministry and Secretary-of-State for Business, in 1905, Eduardo José Coelho the public school equipment initiated a period of development. This involved the rationalization of teaching which extended to the reorganization of spaces, as exemplified by architects Miguel Ventura Terra and José Marques da Silva, who worked on many of the lyceums in Lisbon and Porto. In Lisbon, Ventura Terra was responsible for work done on the Pedro Nunes (1906), Camões (1907) and Maria Amália (1913) lyceums, which became a reference to school architecture in the era and modernized the building culture of the city.

In 1907, Miguel Ventura Terra (1866-1919) was commissioned by the Ministry of the Kingdom and Direção-geral da Instrução Secundária Superior Especial to install a lyceum on State lands. Construction on the site began in January 1908, under the supervision of António Ribeiro. The final project was inaugurated on 16 October 1909.

The lyceum of Camões was constructed to substitute the old National Lyceum of Lisbon, created in 1902, and inadequate for the teaching needs and number of students. At the time of its inauguration there was a general consensus that the building had beautiful conditions and a model for hygiene and pedagogic teaching, as reported by the newspapers. Critics noted that the school was isolated on the square (the Largo do Matadouro Municipal), which was a natural zone on the edge of urban expansion and little accessible. The lyceum, owing to its purpose-built nature (from scratch and specific to teaching) was an architectural educational reference, both formally and esthetically, respecting the functional necessities of the site. The great number of students that this urban lyceums received, and that hygiene theories at the time, meant that there was an obligation to include physical education classes, resulting in a modular system of pavilions used for complimentary classes, with patios and exterior recreational spaces. The principal wings, used for traditional teaching rooms were linked to new sporting pavilions, gymnasium, change rooms and projected swimming pool (which were unique for the country at the time). The lyceum was a public utility, functional and rationalist. It was projected to integrate into the urban fabric, albeit isolated initially. Ventura Terra delineated a construction model that was more simple then the habitual designs, responding to the a request by the first rector of the Central Lyceum, Rui Teles Palhinha:

construction of a building that purpose built...that obeyed the principals of the utmost economy, with the eye to a precise school of airyness and light...and dispensing with pumice and rich woods.

Ventura Terra therefore included rectangular articulated blocks, using new materials for the time (iron and tile) and a composition that did not include closed corridors in favour of halls open to the patio and exterior galleries, and multiple recreational spaces.

Two decades later, in 1927, two pavilions were constructed for physical education and chemistry classes, in response to new reforms in the education system, along with the necessity to alienate the laboratories from the principal installations, to avoid accidents.

In the 1930s, the building was remodelled, in order to expand students, as well as install a new canteen and annexes.

The DGEMN began work on the site in 1954, with periodic repairs and conservation projects, by the Direcção dos Serviços de Construção e Conservação (1954), then the Serviços de Construção e Conservação (1957 and 1961). In 1959, two pavilions/halls were constructed by the Serviços de Construção e Conservação, in conjunction with the Junta de Construções para o Ensino Técnico e Secundário.

In 1970, a bust of Camões commissioned and executed by Fernando Fernandes, which was presented in 1972.

On 3 August 2006, the Vice-President of IPPAR initiated a process to classify the building, that terminated on 6 December 2011 with its classification as a Monumento de Interesse Público by the DRCLVTejo.

== Architecture ==
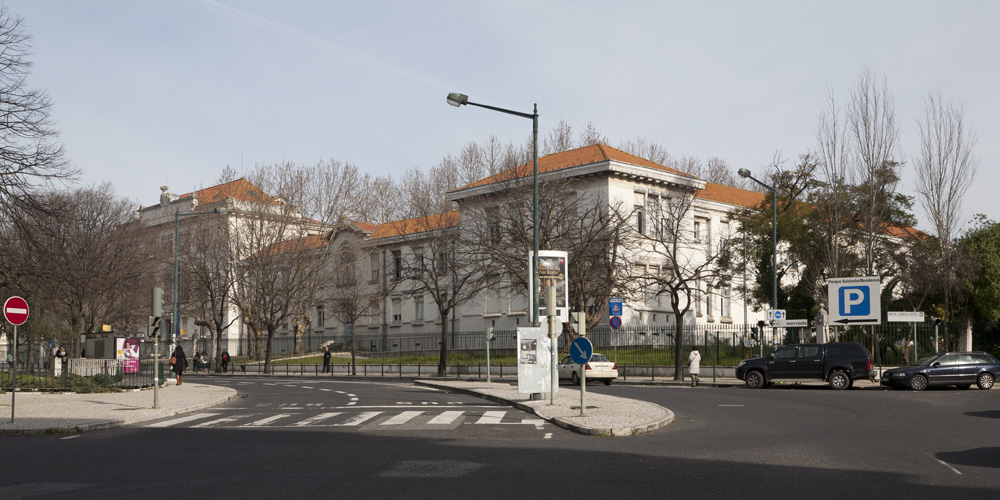
The oblique view of the secondary school

The site is situated in an urban landscape, occupying half of the block delimited by the Praça José Fontana, Rua Almirante Barroso, Rua da Escola de Medicina Veterinária and Rua Dona Estefânia. The Praça José Fontana (a triangular "square") and organized around the Jardim de Henrique Lopes de Mendonça fronts the main facade of the school, separated urban arterial and grated fence with access by pavement stone. To the south, in the neighbouring block, is the Escola Superior de Medicina Veterinária (Superior School of Veterinary Medicine) and to the north, the small walls of the old lyceum, oriented to the Rua Almirante Barroso and the primitive Escola Industrial António Arroio (Industrial School António Arroio).

The symmetrical rectangular plan, in the form of a trident is composed of a principal facade, and two lateral wings, as well as central body parallel to this, that creates two vast, rectangular open spaces used as recreational areas. The halls are distributed, essentially, in the lateral wings and the central block used for gymnasium and refectory, while the front facade provides the administrative spaces for the institution. In the administrative wing is the bust of Camões.

== Notable people ==
=== Literature ===
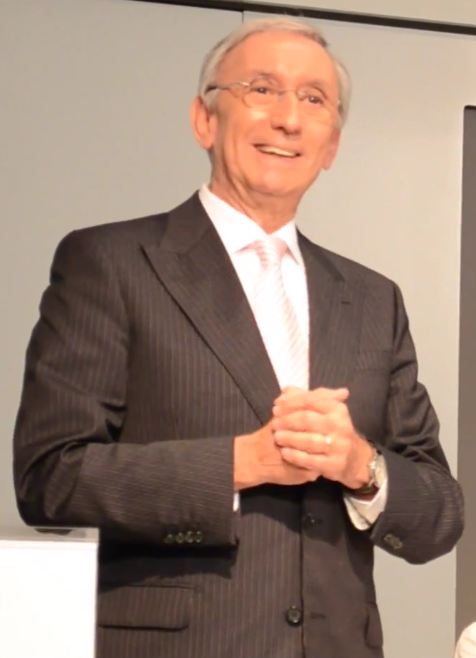
Júlio Isidro: television presenter, radio announcer and entertainer

- Mário de Sá-Carneiro
- Tomás Cabreira Júnior
- Aquilino Ribeiro
- José Rodrigues Miguéis
- Rómulo de Carvalho
- Mário Dionísio
- Jorge de Sena
- José Cardoso Pires
- Luiz Pacheco
- Vergílio Ferreira
- Fernando Namora
- Urbano Tavares Rodrigues
- Almeida Faria
- António Lobo Antunes
- Mário de Carvalho
- Manuel da Fonseca
- João Aguiar
- Baltazar Lopes da Silva
- José Gomes Ferreira
- Eduardo Prado Coelho
- Nuno Júdice
- Júlio Isidro

=== Politics ===
Marcello Caetano, former President of Portugal

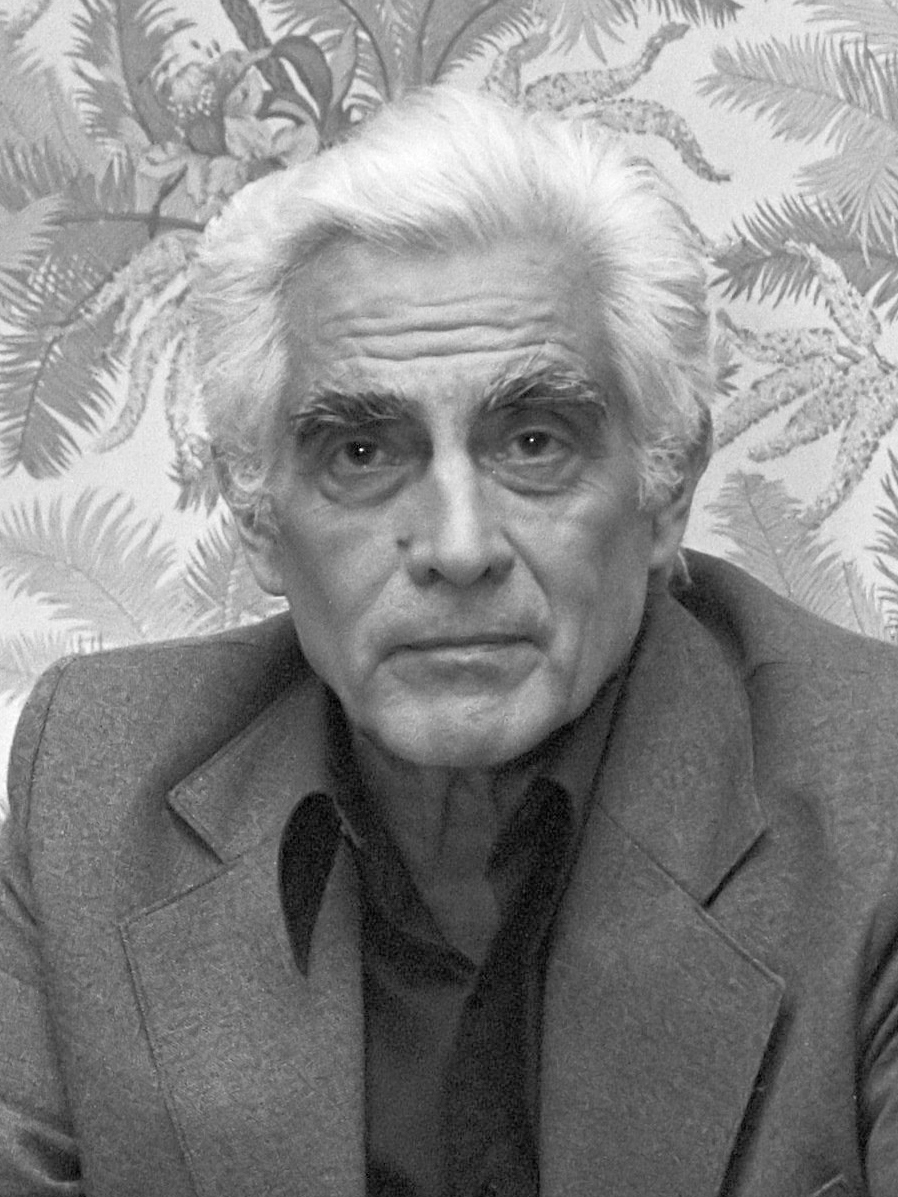
Álvaro Cunhal, former-Communist (PCP) Leader

- Álvaro Cunhal
- Durão Barroso
- António Guterres
- Francisco Cunha Leal
- Garcia Pereira
- Marcelo Caetano
- Rui d'Espiney
- João Semedo

=== Medicine ===
- Nuno Lobo Antunes
- João Lobo Antunes
- Cesina Bermudes
- Mateus Martins Prata
- José Manuel Domingos Pereira Miguel

=== Sports ===
- Mário Moniz Pereira

=== Music ===
- Jorge Palma
- Frederico de Freitas
- Burinda Aguiar

=== Social sciences ===
- Luís Lindley Cintra
- Delfim Santos
- João Bénard da Costa
- Arlindo Manuel Caldeira
- Luís Ribeiro Soares

=== Film and theatre ===
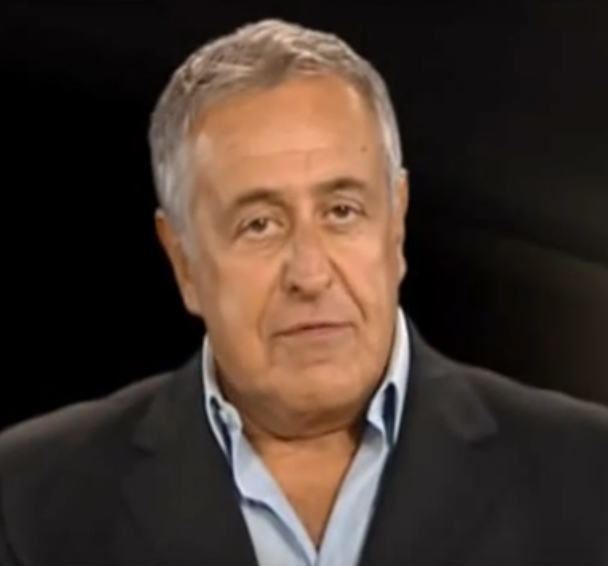
Nicolau Breyner: playwright, director and actor

- Luís Miguel Cintra
- Jorge Silva Melo
- Nicolau Breyner
- Francisco Ribeiro (Ribeirinho)
- Eugénio Salvador
- Francisco Nicholson
- António Montez
- Rui Mendes
