= Árvore =

Árvore may refer to:

- Árvore, Portugal, a civil parish in the municipality of Vila do Conde, Portugal
- Árvore (magazine), a Portuguese literary magazine,
