= 4th Beijing College Student Film Festival =

1997 film festival in Beijing, China

The 4th Beijing College Student Film Festival (simplified Chinese: 第四届北京大学生电影节; traditional Chinese: 第四屆北京大學生電影節) was held in 1997 in Beijing, China.

== Awards ==
- Best Film Award: The Day the Sun Turned Cold, On the Beat
- Best Actor Award: Zhu Xu for The King of Masks
- Best Actress Award: Ning Jing for The Bewitching Braid
- Best Visual Effects Award: The Sorrow of Brook Steppe
- Best First Film Award: Huo Jianqi - Winner
- Artistic Exploration Award: Love Talk
- Committee Special Award: The King of Masks
- Special Recognition Award: Xie Jin
