= Eduarda Dionísio =

Portuguese writer (1946–2023)

Eduarda Dionísio (1946 Lisbon – 22 May 2023 Lisbon) was a Portuguese writer and playwright.

== Career ==
She was the daughter of Mário Dionísio and Maria Letícia Reis Clemente da Silva. She graduated in Languages from the University of Lisbon. She was a secondary school teacher at several schools in Lisbon, including Camões Secondary School. She was also the author, with her mother, of school books for teaching Portuguese, published between 1972 and 1975.

She was part of several theater groups at the Faculty of Arts and Ateneu Cooperativo, having founded the group Contra Regra (1983), where he dedicated himself to literary criticism. She collaborated in theater groups such as «O Bando» and « Teatro da Cornucópia ». As a teacher, she was a union leader at SPGL (Greater Lisbon Teachers' Union) in 1977. She developed various cultural activities (teaching, theater, press, and translation. As a translator, she translated authors as diverse as William Shakespeare and Bertolt Brecht.

She ran Casa da Achada, in Mouraria, where the archive of Mário Dionísio is located.

Dionísio died in Lisbon on May 22, 2023, aged 77.

== Writings and reception ==
=== Antes que a noite venha ===
The conception of Antes que a noite venha came about after a playwriting challenge from actor Adriano Luz, but written to exemplify the capabilities of four specific actresses he named. Because of this, the piece was created for a specific mise-en-scène and it was described by Maria de Fátima Silva as "not aiming to be a theatrical text but rather a text for the theatre".

== Works ==
- Comente o seguinte texto. Lisboa: Plátano, 1972.
- Retrato dum amigo enquanto falo. Lisboa. O Armazém das Letras, 1979.
- Histórias, memórias, imagens e mitos duma geração curiosa. Lisboa: Círculo de Leitores, 1981.
- Pouco tempo depois (as tentações). Lisboa: Gradiva,. 1984.
- Alguns lugares muito comuns: diário de uns quantos dias que não abalaram o mundo. Lisboa: Gradiva, 1987.
- Antes que a Noite Venha. Lisboa: Cotovia: Teatro Nacional D. Maria II,. 1992. ISBN 9729013942
- Títulos, ações, obrigações: a cultura em Portugal, 1974 -1994. Lisboa: Edições Salamandra, 1993.
- «Práticas culturais» in REIS, António (coord.). Portugal: 20 anos de democracia. Lisboa: Temas e Debates, 1996,
- As histórias não têm fim. Lisboa: Cotovia, 1997. ISBN 9728028903
