= Amor e Dedinhos de Pé =

Amor e Dedinhos de Pé Amor y deditos del pie Macao, mépris et passion
- French poster
- Directed by: Luís Filipe Rocha
- Written by: Luís Filipe Rocha; Izaías Almada
- Based on: Amor e Dedinhos de Pé by Henrique de Senna Fernandes
- Produced by: Ángel Amigo Quincoces; Tino Navarro
- Starring: Joaquim de Almeida; Ana Torrent; Jean-Pierre Cassel
- Cinematography: Eduardo Serra
- Edited by: Bernardette Martin
- Music by: António Gonçalves da Silva Taborda; Enrique Xabier Macías
- Production companies: MGN Filmes; Ou Mun Filmes; Chrysalide Films; Impala; Jet Films; Igeldo Zine Produkzioak
- Release date: 20 March 1992 (Macau)
- Running time: 125 minutes
- Countries: Portugal; France; Spain
- Language: Portuguese

Amor e Dedinhos de Pé (literally: 'Love and Tiny Toes'; Spanish: Amor y deditos del pie; French: Macao, mépris et passion) is a 1992 Portuguese-language Portuguese-French-Spanish film of romantic drama genre, directed and written by Luís Filipe Rocha and Izaías Almada, and starring Joaquim de Almeida, Ana Torrent and Jean-Pierre Cassel. It is based on the novel Amor e Dedinhos de Pé: Romance de Macau by the Macanese writer Henrique de Senna Fernandes. The film was premiered in Macau on 20 March 1992, and was released in France on 21 October of the same year. In Portugal it was released on 15 January 1993, and in Spain on 6 August of the same year.

== Summary ==
The film shows the social difficulties of a romance born on a cold night in Macau, when a seductive playboy is in love with a young woman who washes his toes. The story serves to make a portrait of the Portuguese colonialist society of Macau. In the end of the 19th century, the Portuguese Christian society melancholically looks towards Europe and proudly turns its back on China. In this context the love between Francisco and Victorina reflects all the contradictions of the social nucleus to which they belong.

== Cast ==
- Joaquim de Almeida as Francisco Frontaria
- Ana Torrent as Victorina Vidal
- Jean-Pierre Cassel as Gonçalo Botelho
- João D'Ávila as Hipólito
- Omero Antonutti as Padilla
- Gemma Cuervo as Cesaltina
- Pilar Bardem as Amparo
- María Elena Flores as Carmencita
- Henrique Viana as Timoteo
- Manuela Cassola as Titi Bita
- José Manuel Mendes as padre Miguel
- Isidoro Fernández as Silvério
- Vítor Norte as Leopoldo
- Alberto Larumbe as Camilo
- Rui Luís Brás as Mezicles
- Henrique de Senna Fernandes as Barreto
- Manuela Couto as Victorina (voice)
- João Lourenço as Gonçalo Botelho (voice)

== Production ==
The film was shot in Macau, places including the Lou Lim Ieoc Garden, during the Portuguese administration in the territory.

== Awards and nominations ==
Awards and nominations
Ceremony	Category	Recipient	Outcome
16th Cairo International Film Festival	Best Film	Love and Tiny Toes	Nominated
