= Izaías Almada =

Brazilian writer

Izaías Almada is a Brazilian novelist, playwright, and screenwriter. In 1963 he moved to the city of São Paulo where he worked in theater, journalism, TV advertising, and script writing. Between the years of 1969 and 1971, he was a political prisoner of the military coup in Brazil that took place in 1964.

== Early life ==
He was born on April 16, 1942, in the city of Belo Horizonte, Minas Gerais, Brazil. Between 1960 and 1962 he finished high school in the Colégio Estadual de Minas Gerais (The High School of Minas Gerais State) and took the acting course at the Teatro Universitário de Minas Gerais (University Theatre of Minas Gerais). While attending university, he studied the Stanislavsky method with American acting instructor James Colby. He also studied Elizabethan theater with professor Francisco de Paula Lima and theater acting with professor Haydée Bittencourt. Also, he studied at the Escola de Arte Dramática de São Paulo (São Paulo's Schools of Dramatic Arts) with other instructors such as Sábato Magaldi, Alfredo Mesquita, Paulo Mendonça, Leila Khoury, Augusto Boal, and others.

He was admitted into the University of São Paulo as a student in the faculty of Philosophy and Social Sciences and took classes with Fernando Novais, Gioconda Mussolini, and Otávio Ianni, among other teachers.

== Career ==
"A Metade Arrancada de Min" was his first published novel in Brazil and it was originally written as a movie script. It won an award of the Secretary of Culture of the State of São Paulo in 1987.

As an actor, he worked in the plays Arena Conta Zumbi by Augusto Boal and Gianfrancesco Guarnieri, The Inspector General by Gogol, directed by Augusto Boal, and Candide by Voltaire, with theater adaptation by Carlos Alberto Sofreie for the Studio São Pedro, directed by Myriam Muniz. He also adapted part of the work of the Portuguese poet Fernando Pessoa into a theater piece, together with Jandira Martini and Luiz Raul Machado. He worked at the Companhia de Teatro Paulo Autran (Paulo Autran's Theatre Company), where he was part of the performances of Cosi E Si Vi Pari by Pirandello, directed by Flávio Rangel, and Les Femmes Savantes by Molière, directed by Silney Siqueira. He also participated in the musical O Homem de la Mancha by Dale Wassermann, directed by Flávio Rangel. Furthermore, he went to Portugal with the Companhia de Ruth Escobar (Ruth Escobar Theatre Company) and played a role in Cemitério de Automòveis by Fernando Arrabal, directed by Victor Garcia.

In 1974, he directed a theater piece about Fernando Pessoa for Teatro Opinião, with Cláudio Cavalcante and Maria Cláudia in the main roles.

Between 1975 and 1990 he worked in advertising as a TV director at Movie&Art, which he co-founded with the current CEO Paulo Dantas. He sold his share of the company just before moving to Portugal in 1991. During these 15 years, he directed more than five hundred TV ads in Brazil and abroad, and was awarded several times in Brazilian festivals and international festivals. In 1984 he received the Cannes Lion for the category "Perfumes".

== Bibliography ==
- A Metade Arrancada de Mim – novel – Ed. Estação Liberdade/SP, 1989
- O Medo Por Trás das Janelas – novel – Ed. Estação Liberdade/SP, 1991
- Florão da América – novel – Ed. Estação Liberdade/SP, 1994
- Memórias Emotivas – narratives – Ed. Mania de Livro/SP, 1996
- O Vidente da Rua 46 – erotic narratives – E. Mania de Livro/SP, 2001
- Teatro de Arena: uma estética de resistência – memories – Ed.Boitempo/SP, 2004
- Venezuela Povo e Forças Armadas – non-fiction documentary – Ed. Caros Amigos/SP, 2007
- Sucursal do Inferno – novel – Ed. Prumo, 2012

=== As co-author ===
- With Alípio Freire and J. Adolfo de Granville Ponce: Tiradentes: um Presídio da Ditatura – Ed. Scipione/SP, 1997
- With Bernadette Figueiredo: Rutch Rachou – biography – Ed. Caros Amigos/SP, 2008
- Fear behind the Windows, originally O Medo por Detras de Jamelas has been translated into English by Isabel de Sena the daughter of the Portuguese writer Jorge de Sena. However, the book has not yet been published.

== Awards ==
Izaías also received the following awards:

- Literary Revelation by the APCA of São Paulo (1989) for the book “A Metade Arrancada de Mim”.
- The Vladimir Herzog award of Human Rights in the category of theatre (1995), with the play UMA QUESTÃO DE IMAGEM, award given by the Sindicato dos Jornalistas Profissionais de São Paulo (The Professional Journalists Union of São Paulo)
- Award for Dramaturgy Stimulus of the Secretaria de Estado da cultura de São Paulo for writing the play “NÃO PEÇAM AO MEU CORAÇÃO PARA ESQUECER”.

As a script writer of feature films and TV Series:

- He co-wrote with the Portuguese film maker, Luís Filipe Rocha, the movie scripts for Amore E Dedinhos de Pê (1990) and Sinais de Fogo adapted from the book with the same title by Jorge de Sena (1992), filmed in co-productions with Spain and France.
- Homeward for MGN Filmes of Portugal, with support from the Euroscript Fund.
- Africa Banzo for the caboverdean film maker Leão Lopes .
- Together with Pedro Vicente he wrote O Poeta da Vila film about the life of Noel Rosa
- For Costa do Castelo Filmes, Lda, Portugal, adapts the novel A Selva by Ferreira de Castro for the Film Director Leonel Vieira, a co-production of Portugal, Brasil, Spain and Hungary, filmed in 2001, location the Amazon, and released in Brasil in 2005.
- One of the authors of the TV series Segredo for Stopline Filmes of Portugal, aired in 2005 by RTP1.
- O Julgamento for Stopline Filmes de Lisboa, directed by Leonel Vieira in Portugal, also a TV series with four episodes. Released in Lisbon in 2007.
- Worked as a Script Doctor for 2 Coelhos, Afonso Poyart's first feature film, of Blackmaria Produções em São Paulo.
- Writes the first version of the script CARLOS GOMES: A FORÇA DO DESTINO.

As a dramatic advisor:

- For the International Theatre Festival in Lisbon (1993) he directed the play As Vedetas by Lucien Lambert, very well received by Portuguese critics.
- Co-author of the play Lembrar é Resistir, staged in São Paulo and Rio de Janeiro, part of the celebrations of 20 years of Amnesty in Brasil.
- Wrote the play PAI, about missing political prisoners, presented in the Dramaturgy Cycle of Teatro Agora in São Paulo. PAI opened in the Teatro Sérgio Cardoso( Sergio Cardoso Theatre) and also in the Centro Cultural São Paulo ( Cultural Centre of São Paulo).
- Staged his own play Uma Questão de Imagem at the Teatro Studio 184 in São Paulo.

He was invited by the Municipal Secretary of Culture, Celso Frateschi, to be part of the Judging Committee of the program of theatre incentive to the city of São Paulo.

His project Boal: Embaixador do Teatro Brasileiro – research in scenic arts - is approved by ProAc da Sec. De Cultura do Estado de São Paulo.

He was a teacher of the Acting Program of SENAC, Scipião/Lapa unity in São Paulo.

In Cabo Verde he produced a Seminar for Script Writing, sponsored by the Instituto Caboverdeano de Cinema. (Caboverdean Cinema Institute)

Coordinator of the seminar A Palavra e o cinema (The Word and the Cinema) about the fundamentals of script writing at the Casa Mário de Andrade in São Paulo, organized by Secretaria de Estado da Cultura.

He was one of the speakers in an event about the book The Necessity of Art by Ernst Fischer in the Teatro Studio Heleny Guariba.

A collaborator of articles about culture in the magazine Caros Amigos and the magazine Bravo.

== Family life ==
He had three children: André Almada, Ana Luísa Almada, and Vinícius Almada.
