= Mário Dionísio =

Portuguese critic, writer and painter

- Born: Mário Dionísio de Assis Monteiro; July 16, 1916; Lisbon, Portugal
- Died: November 17, 1993 (aged 77); Lisbon, Portugal
- Occupations: Critic, writer, painter and teacher
- Children: Eduarda Dionísio

Mário Dionísio de Assis Monteiro (July 16, 1916, in Lisbon, Portugal – November 17, 1993, in Lisbon, Portugal) was a Portuguese critic, writer, painter, and professor.

Also a poet, novelist, and essayist, Mário Dionísio had a significant civic and cultural impact on 20th-century Portugal, particularly in literature and art.

== Biography ==
Mário Dionísio de Assis Monteiro was born on July 16, 1916, in Lisbon.

He was the son of Eurico Monteiro, a merchant and militia officer in the Military Administration, and Julieta Goulart Parreira Monteiro, a homemaker who had completed advanced studies in Piano. He is the father of Eduarda Dionísio.

He graduated in Romance Philology in 1940 from the Faculty of Letters at the University of Lisbon.

He worked as a high school and secondary school teacher and later as a lecturer at the Faculty of Letters of the University of Lisbon, following the April 25th Revolution.

Mário Dionísio was an opponent of the Estado Novo regime and had connections to the Portuguese Communist Party, from which he distanced himself in the 1950s.

In September 2009, the Casa da Achada – Centro Mário Dionísio (Mário Dionísio Center) opened to the public. The center was founded in Lisbon the previous September by more than fifty family members, friends, former students, assistants, and experts and scholars of his work, with the aim of becoming a cultural center in Lisbon. The institution is directed by the writer's daughter, Eduarda Dionísio.

=== The literary work ===
He was the author of an independent literary work (poetry, short stories, novels). He engaged in literary and art criticism, delivered lectures, participated in debates, and contributed to various periodicals, including Seara Nova, Vértice, Diário de Lisboa, Mundo Literário, Ge de todas as Artes, and the magazine Arte Opinião (1978–1982). He also wrote prefaces for works by authors such as Manuel da Fonseca, Carlos de Oliveira, José Cardoso Pires, and Alves Redol.

== Works ==
=== Poetry ===
- As solicitações e emboscadas: Poemas. S. l., s, d (Coimbra: Tipografia Atlântida)
- O riso dissonante: Poemas. Lisbon: Centro Bibliográfico, 1950.
- Memória dum pintor desconhecido. Lisbon: Portugália, 1965. Coleção Poetas de hoje, 19.
- Poesia incompleta: 1936–1965. Lisbon: Europa-América, 1966.
- Le feu qui dort. Neuchâtel: Éditions de la Baconniére; Lisbon: Europa-América, 1967.
- Terceira idade. Mem-Martins: Europa-América, 1982. Mário Dionísio Collection, 10.
- O mundo dos outros: histórias e vagabundagens (preface). Lisbon: Dom Quixote, 2000. Pocket Library Collection, Literature, 13. ISBN 972-20-1879-5
- Poesia completa. Lisbon: National Press — Casa da Moeda, 2016. Plural Collection. ISBN 978-972-27-2450-0

=== Prose ===
- O dia cinzento: contos. Coimbra: Coimbra Editora, 1954. New Prosecutors Collection.
- Não há morte nem princípio. Mem Martins: Europa-América, 1969. Collection of works by Mário Dionísio, 4.
- Monólogo a duas vozes: histórias. Lisbon: D. Quixote, 1986. Portuguese Language Authors Collection.
- A morte é para os outros. Lisbon: O Jornal, 1988. Dias de Prosa Collection.

=== Painting ===
- Vincent Van Gogh: study. S.l., s.n., 1947. The Great Painters and Sculptors Collection.
- A paleta e o mundo. Lisboa: Europa-América, 1956–1962, 3 vols.
- Conflito e unidade da arte contemporânea. Lisboa: Iniciativas Editoriais, 1958.

== Awards and honors ==
- Mário Dionísio was awarded the Grand Prize for Essay (1963) by the Portuguese Writers' Society in 1963 for his work A Paleta e o Mundo (English: The Palette and the World).
- For the work "Terceira Idade," Mário Dionísio received the Criticism Prize from the Portuguese Center of the International Association of Literary Critics (CPAICL) (1981), tied with Alexandre O'Neill.
- He was honored in the toponymy of Lisbon with the naming of a street in the Lumiar parish. This was decided on July 20, 2005, and announced in an official decree on August 1 of the same year by the Lisbon City Council. The Mário Dionísio street was inaugurated on October 26, 2016.

== Bibliography ==
- Mário Dionísio (1916–1993) : correspondências : cartas, cartões, postais, telegramas e algumas obras de arte
- Para que pode servir a memória : a intervenção de Mário Dionísio no pós 25 de Abril
- O percurso teórico de Mário Dionísio em "A paleta e o mundo"
- A "expulsão" de um transviado". PÚBLICO
- "Mário Dionísio, um homem dividido". PÚBLICO
- "Revista Seara Nova – Cultura – Mário Dionísio Poeta do utopismo possível". searanova.publ.pt
- "Mário Dionísio, a obra continua viva". PÚBLICO
- Notas sobre o lugar de Mário Dionísio no neorealismo
- Vergílio Ferreira – Mário Dionísio : Correspondência (1950–1967)
