= Boliqueime =

- Civil parish
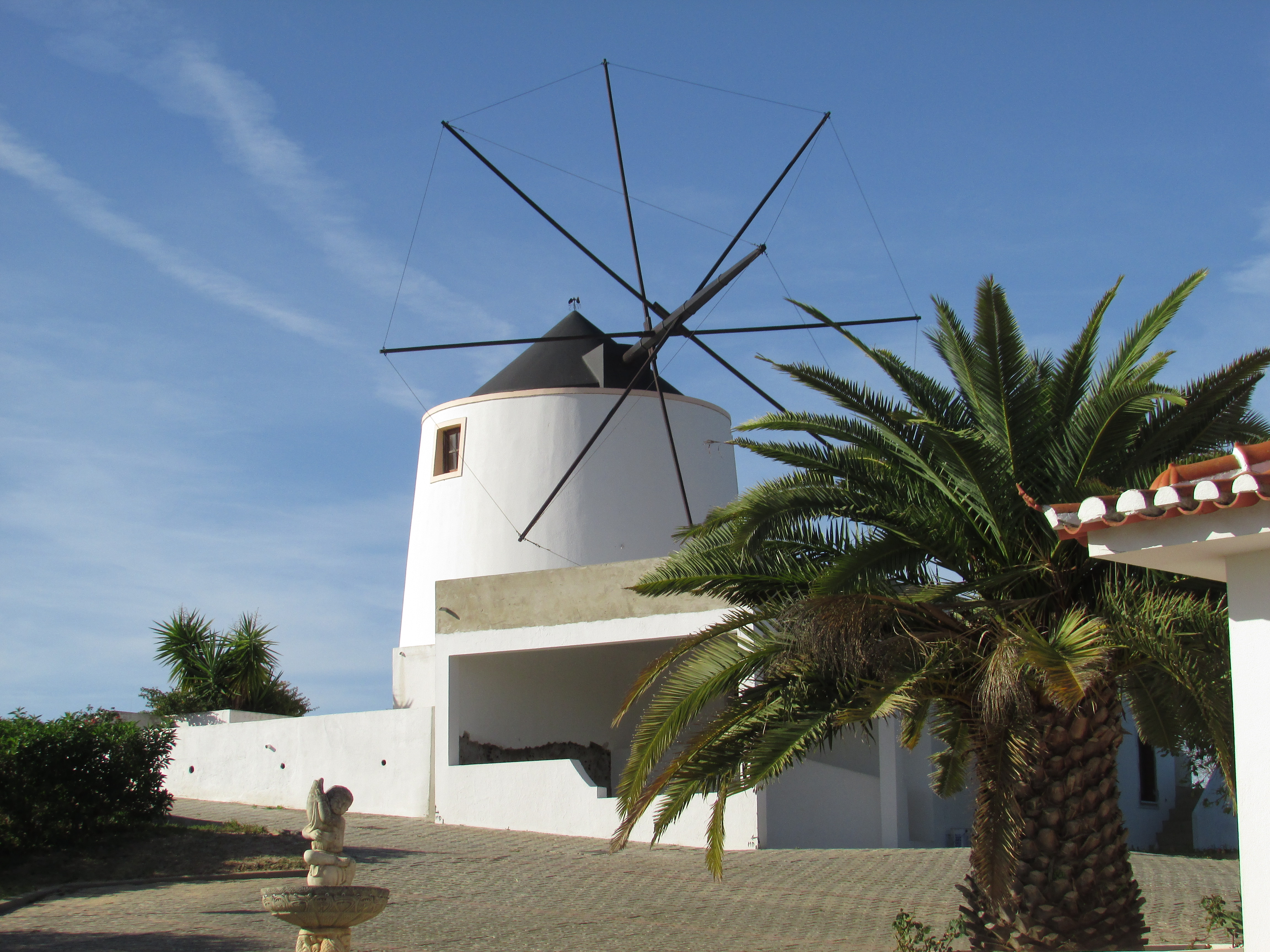
- Restored windmill located on Travessa do Moinho

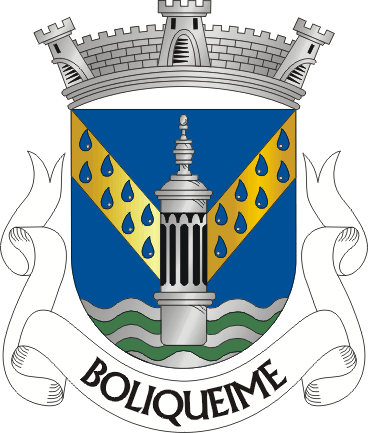
- Coat of arms

- Location in Portugal
- Coordinates: 37.133°N 8.159°W
- Country: Portugal
- Region: Algarve
- Intermunic. comm.: Algarve
- District: Faro
- Municipality: Loulé

Area
  - Total: 46.21 km^{2} (17.84 sq mi)

Population (2011)
  - Total: 4,973
  - Density: 107.6/km^{2} (278.7/sq mi)
- Time zone: UTC+00:00 (WET)
  - Summer (DST): UTC+01:00 (WEST)

Boliqueime (European Portuguese pronunciation: [buliˈkɐjmɨ]) is a Portuguese village and freguesia ("civil parish"), located in the municipality of Loulé, in the region of Algarve. The population in 2011 was 4,973, in an area of 46.21 km². The urbanized core of the village is about 50 m to 95 m above sea level. Located in central Algarve, 27 km from Faro International Airport it is a well preserved small village less than 20 minutes away from both the inland city of Loulé, the seat of the municipality, and the coastal settlements of Vilamoura, a famed resort with marina, and Albufeira, a city by the sea with some of the most popular beaches in the region.

== Notable people ==
- Aníbal Cavaco Silva, President of Portugal from 2006 to 2016 and Prime Minister of Portugal from 1985 to 1995, was born in this village in 1939.
- Lídia Jorge, novelist and author as well as a member of Portugal's Council of State.
- Clive Dunn, Dad's Army actor, best known for his role as Lance Corporal Jack Jones, spent his last 3 decades here.

== Gallery ==
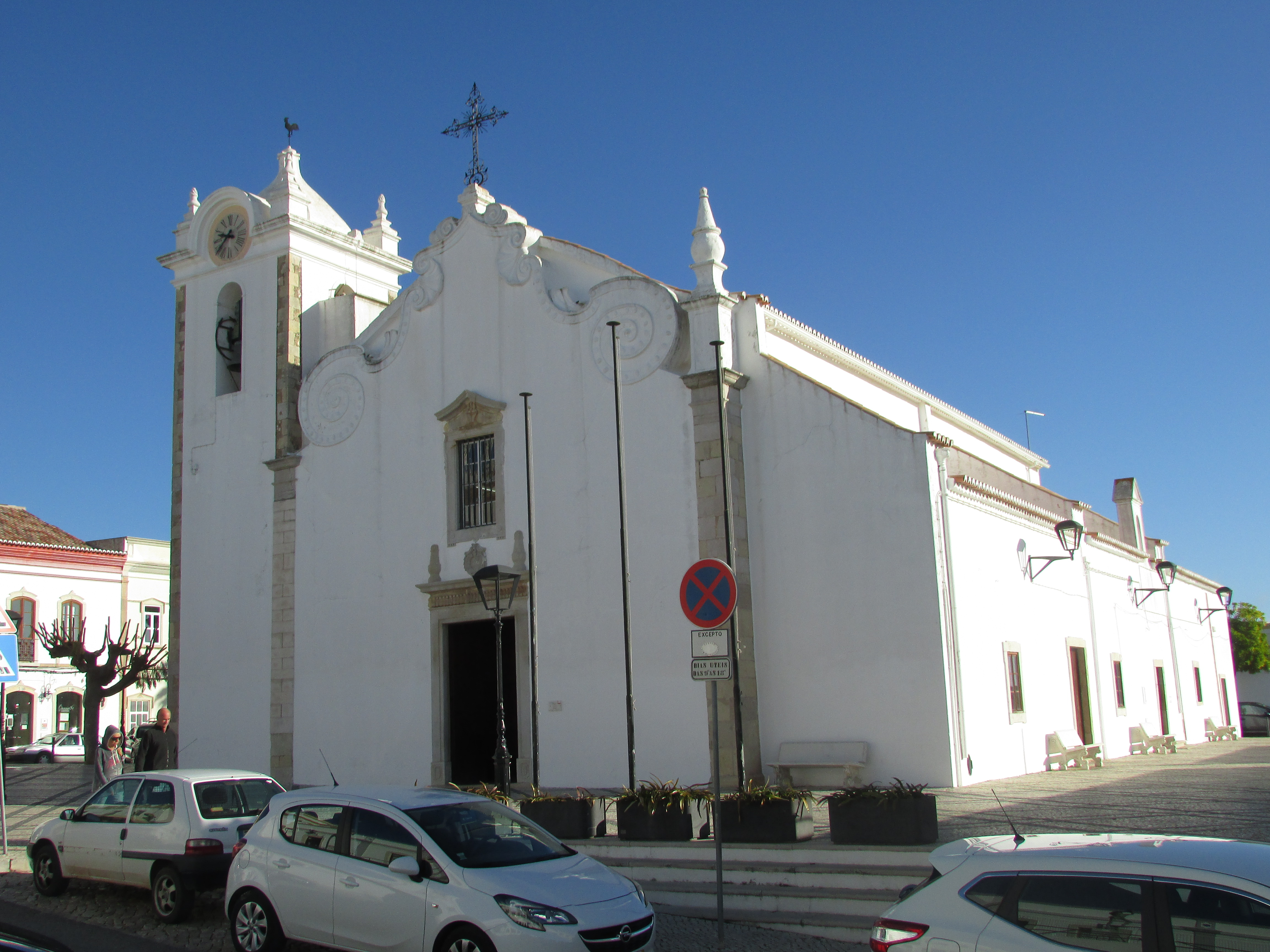
Matrix Church of São Sebastião de Boliqueime

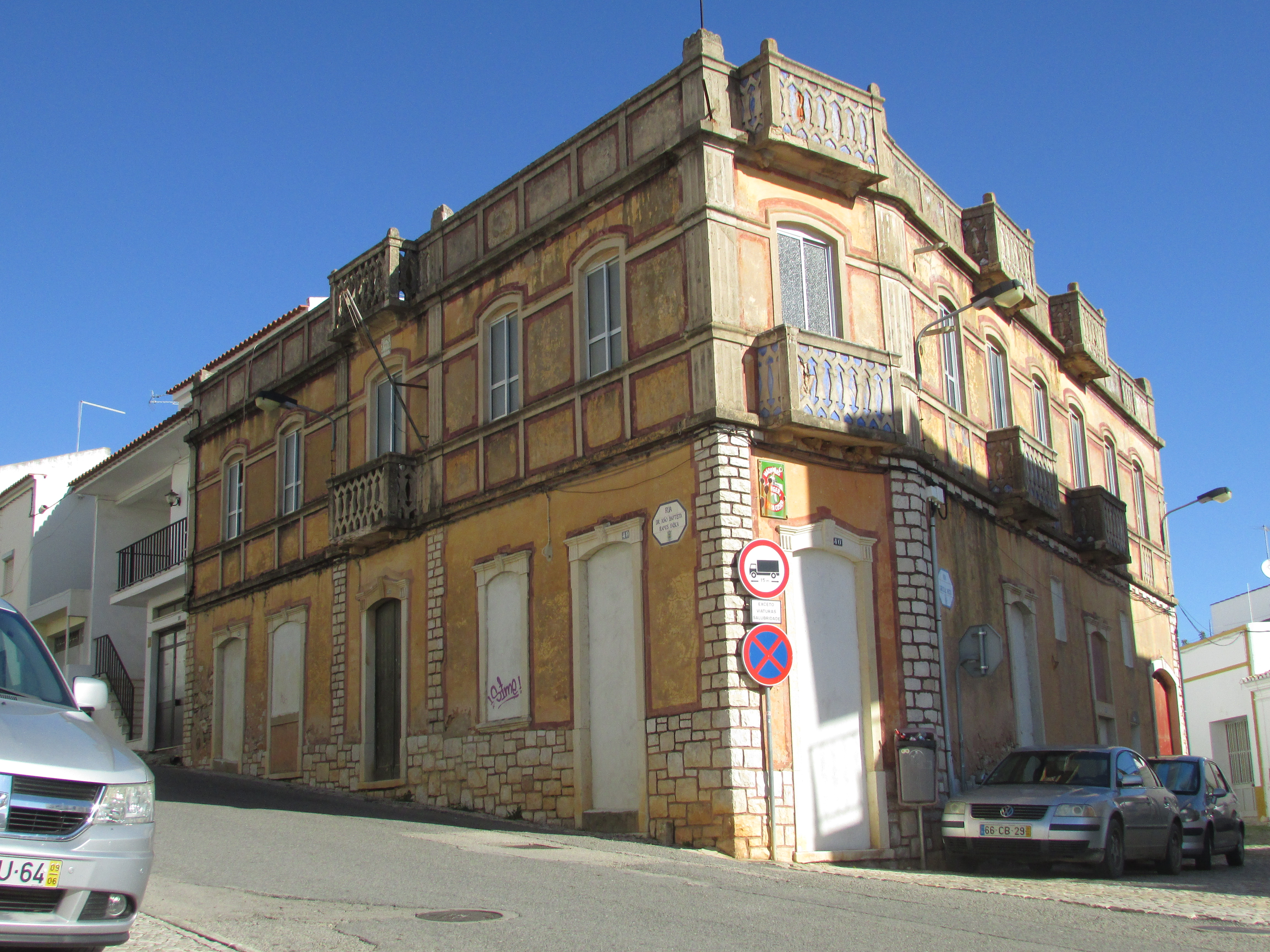

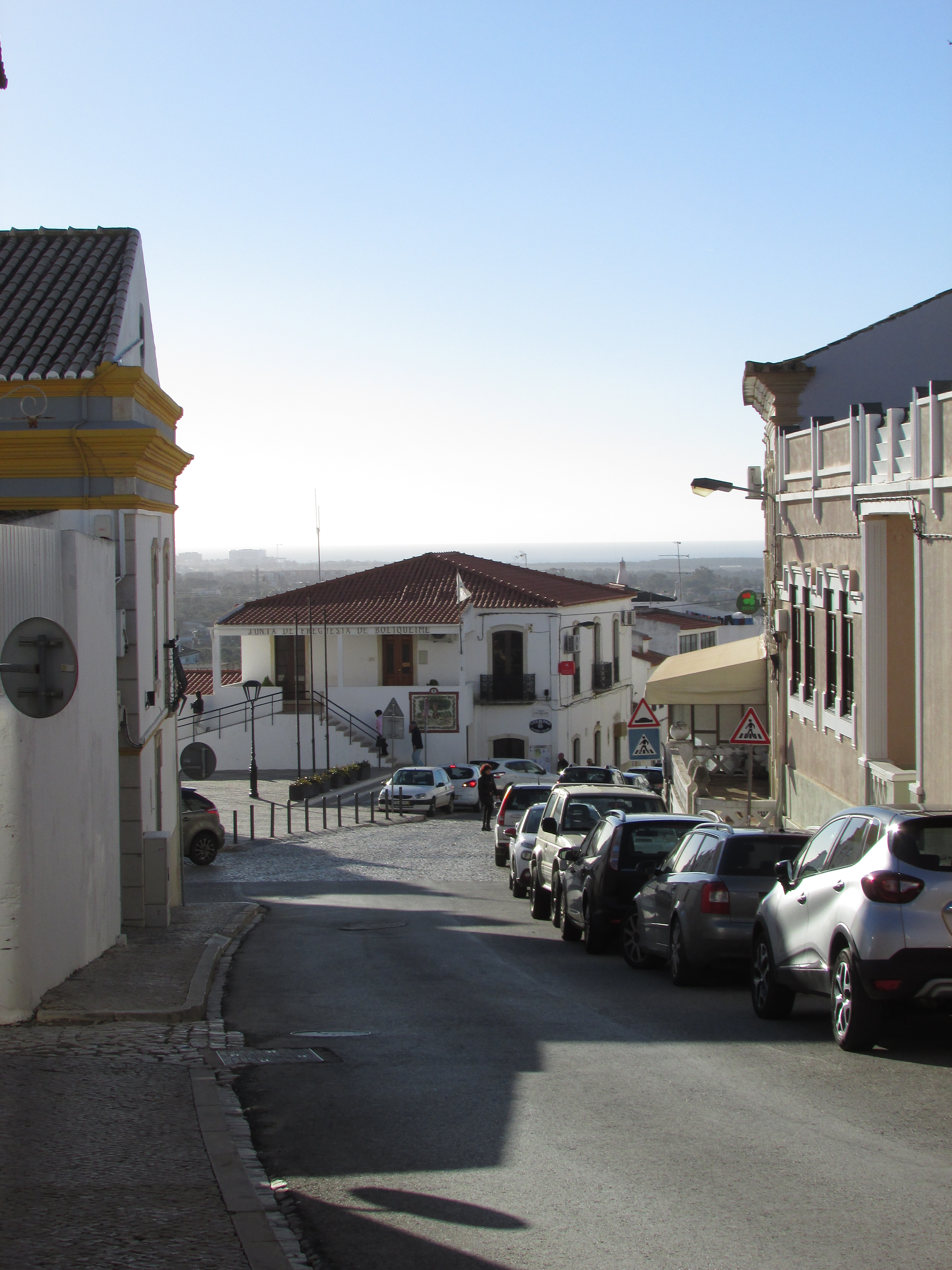
Dr João Batista Ramos Faísca street looking south

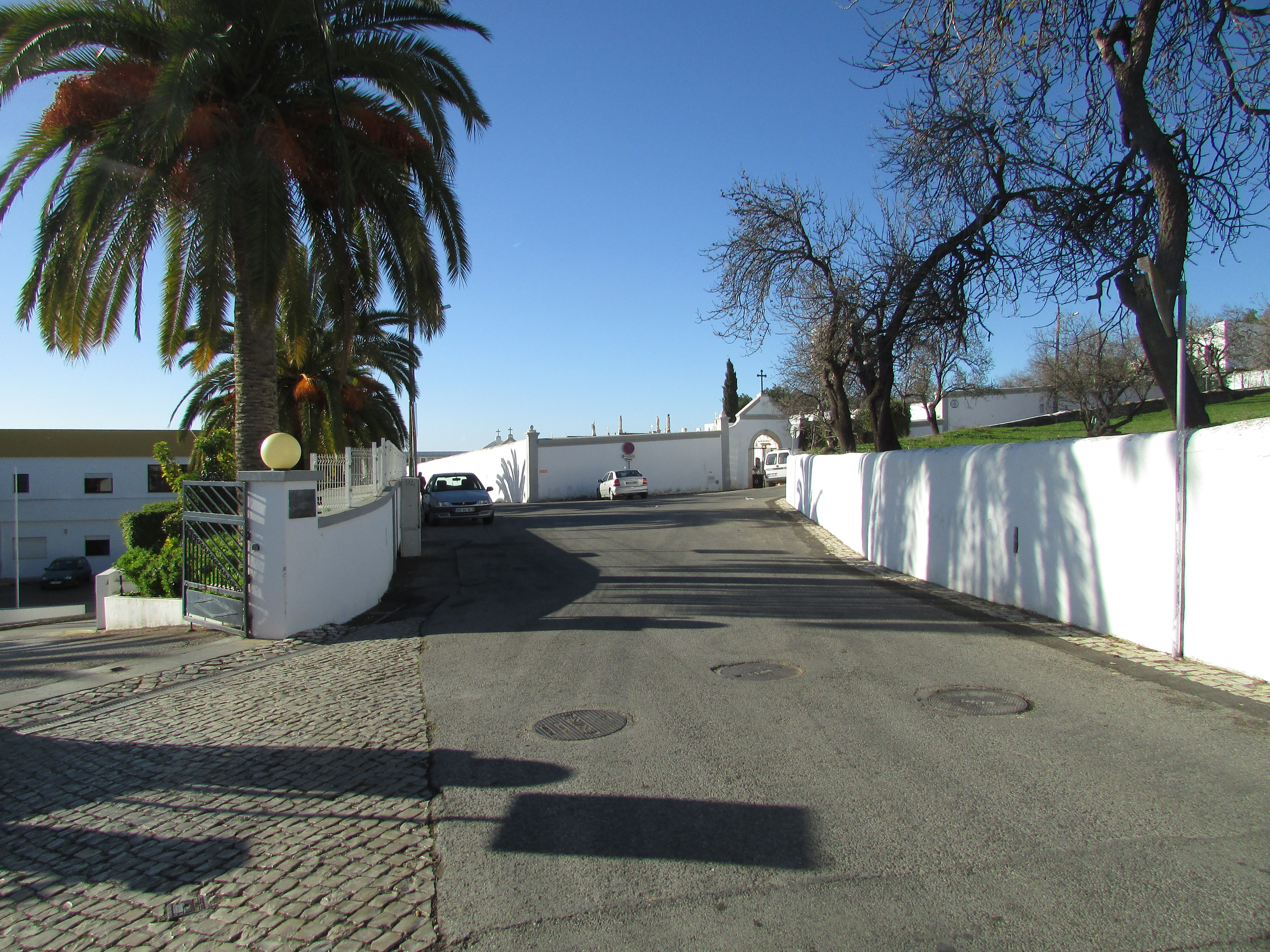
Misericórdia street

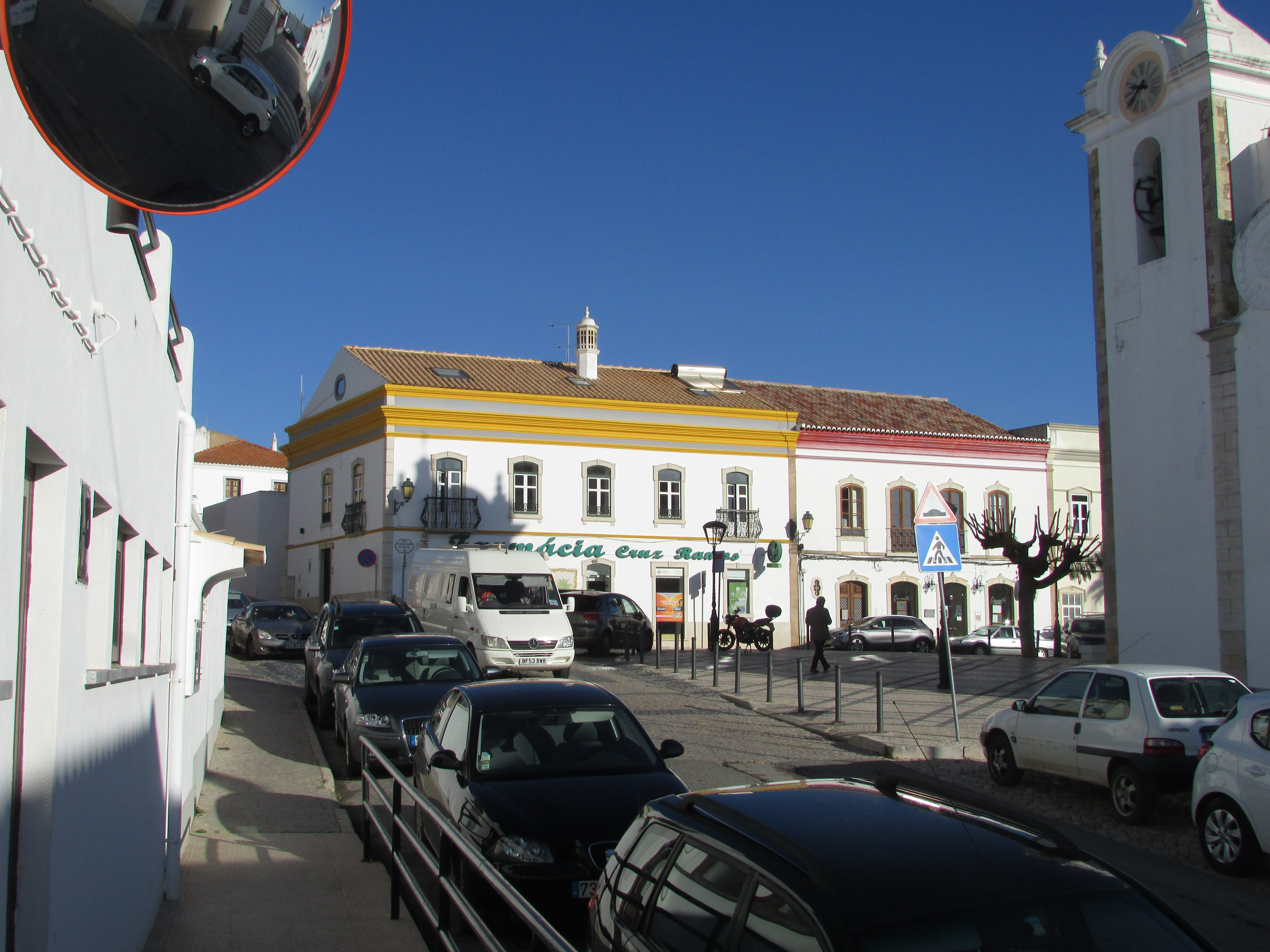
Dr João Batista Ramos Faísca street looking north
