= The Bewitching Braid (novel) =

1993 novel by Henrique de Senna Fernandes

Chinese name
- Traditional Chinese: 大辮子的誘惑
- Simplified Chinese: 大辫子的诱惑
- Literal meaning: The attraction of the big braid
Transcriptions
Standard Mandarin
- Hanyu Pinyin: Dà Biànzi de Yòuhuò
Yue: Cantonese
- Jyutping: daai6 bin1 zi2 dik1 jau5 waak6

Portuguese name
- Portuguese: A Trança Feiticeira

The Bewitching Braid (Portuguese: A Trança Feiticeira) is a 1993 novel by Henrique de Senna Fernandes, of Macau. It was written originally in Portuguese and published by Fundação Oriente. The English translation of this novel was published by Hong Kong University Press in 2004, with translation by David Brookshaw. The Chinese translation, Dà Biànzi de Yòuhuò (大辮子的誘惑), translated by Yu Hui Yuan, was published by the Macau Cultural Affairs Bureau (澳門文化司署) in 1996.

The novel was adapted into a 1996 film, The Bewitching Braid.

According to Brookshaw, the novel was "politically correct" as the Handover of Macau was imminent. Brookshaw compared the plot to that of Escrava Isaura.

== Plot ==
The novel is about a relationship between a Macanese man and a Chinese woman. The story is set in the 1930s.

Adozindo, the man, is of mixed Chinese, Dutch, and Portuguese heritage; according to Brooks, his education was geared towards commercial enterprise and "rudimentary". A-Leng, the woman, is of Chinese heritage.

The resolution in which the couple stays together and raises a family, according to Wang Chun, reflects Chinese culture and "especially show[s] a tendency towards a Chinese style of art appreciation."

== Release outside of Macau and Hong Kong ==
The HKU Press English version is distributed in the United States by University of Chicago Press.

In Brazil, the novel is published by Gryphus.
