= Balada da Praia dos Cães =

1982 novel by José Cardoso Pires

Ballad of Dogs' Beach
- Author: José Cardoso Pires
- Original title: Balada da Praia dos Cães
- Translator: Mary Fitton
- Language: Portuguese
- Genre: Political novel
- Publisher: Edicoes O Jornal
- Publication date: 1982
- Publication place: Portugal
- English publication date: 1986
- Media type: Print (Paperback)
- Followed by: Alexandra Alpha

Ballad of Dogs' Beach (in original Portuguese Balada da Praia dos Cães) is a fiction novel by the Portuguese author José Cardoso Pires, relating the investigation into the murder of a political dissident, taking place around one month later by 1961. The novel is largely based on contemporary reports of a real murder that took place. The real story is the assassination in early 1961 of Army captain Almeida Santos by Jean Jacques, an Army m. d. They were both dissidents of the political regime who escaped from prison with the help of a prison guard. The three men took refuge in a house in Guincho Beach, twenty km outside Lisbon. They were joined by Maria José Maldonado Sequeira, a beautiful young woman who had an affair with Alemeida Santos. While waiting for opportunity to leave the country, Maria José started a love affair with the two men, Santos and Jacques, which caused a fight between them and the death of Santos. Jacques buried him in the beach with the help of the guard. The body was discovered one month later by a dog whose owner was taking a walk.

== Synopsis ==
Balada da Praia dos Cães recounts the investigation of a murder. The story begins with the report of the discovery of a corpse buried on Mastro beach, thanks to some dogs that, by chance, find the dead buried in the sand. Later, the police discover that he is Major Luís Dantas Castro, a soldier arrested for attempting military sedition against the current political regime, who had escaped from prison, going to retire, along with three accomplices: Mena, a young woman with whom the Major had a violent and obsessive relationship before his imprisonment, the architect Fonte Nova, another prisoner detained for his involvement in the military revolt and a member of the same anti-Salazarist resistance movement as the Major, and Corporal Barroca, a guard at the field to carry out his military service.

The four take refuge in a house located 20 km from Lisbon, awaiting the help of the lawyer Gama e Sá, nicknamed by them as Commodore.

The person in charge of the investigation is Elias Santana, a head of the Judiciary Police brigade, who reconstructs the crime thanks mainly to the interrogations made to Mena, confirmed and completed later by the other two accomplices, meanwhile arrested. It is proved that the major was murdered by his three escape companions.

The book's action unfolds on two levels: on the one hand, what happened before the crime, told from Mena's perspective; on the other hand, the police investigation and the life of Elias Santana. In this last plan, the book portrays the reality and methods of the police during the Estado Novo regime, as well as the sad, routine and dull life of Elias Santana.
