= Camarate (film) =

2000 film by Luis Filipe Rocha

- Directed by: Luís Filipe Rocha
- Written by: Luís Filipe Rocha
- Produced by: Tino Navarro
- Starring: Maria João Luís; Virgílio Castelo; Filipe Ferrer; Cândido Ferreira; José Wallenstein
- Cinematography: Edgar Moura
- Edited by: Antonio Perez Reina
- Music by: Luis Cilia
- Production company: Mgn Filmes [PT]
- Distributed by: MGN Filmes
- Release date: 1 December 2000
- Running time: 140 minutes
- Country: Portugal
- Language: Portuguese

Camarate: accidente ou atentado? (English: Camarate: accident or assassination?) is a 2001 Portuguese film directed by Luis Filipe Rocha on the investigation of the 1980 Camarate air crash. Starring Maria João Luís, Virgílio Castelo, Filipe Ferrer, Cândido Ferreira, and José Wallenstein, it was released in Portuguese cinemas on December 1, 2000.

It was Portugal's submission to the 74th Academy Awards for the Academy Award for Best Foreign Language Film, but it was not accepted as a nominee.

== Cast ==
- Maria João Luís as Luísa
- Virgílio Castelo as Diogo
- Filipe Ferrer as Carlos
- Cândido Ferreira as Manuel Mesquita
- José Wallenstein as Paulo
- Ana Nave as Marta
- Adriano Luz as André
- José Meireles as Joaquim
- João Lobo as David
- Alexandra Leite as Diana
- Carlos Quintas as Antonio
- António Pedro Cerdeira as Pilot
- Luís Lucas as Sá Carneiro
- João Reis as Gaspar Frade
- Luís Mascarenhas as Inácio Costa
- João Perry as Doctor

== See also ==
- List of submissions to the 74th Academy Awards for Best Foreign Language Film
