= Lídia Jorge =

Portuguese writer (born 1946)

Lídia Jorge GCIH GCSE
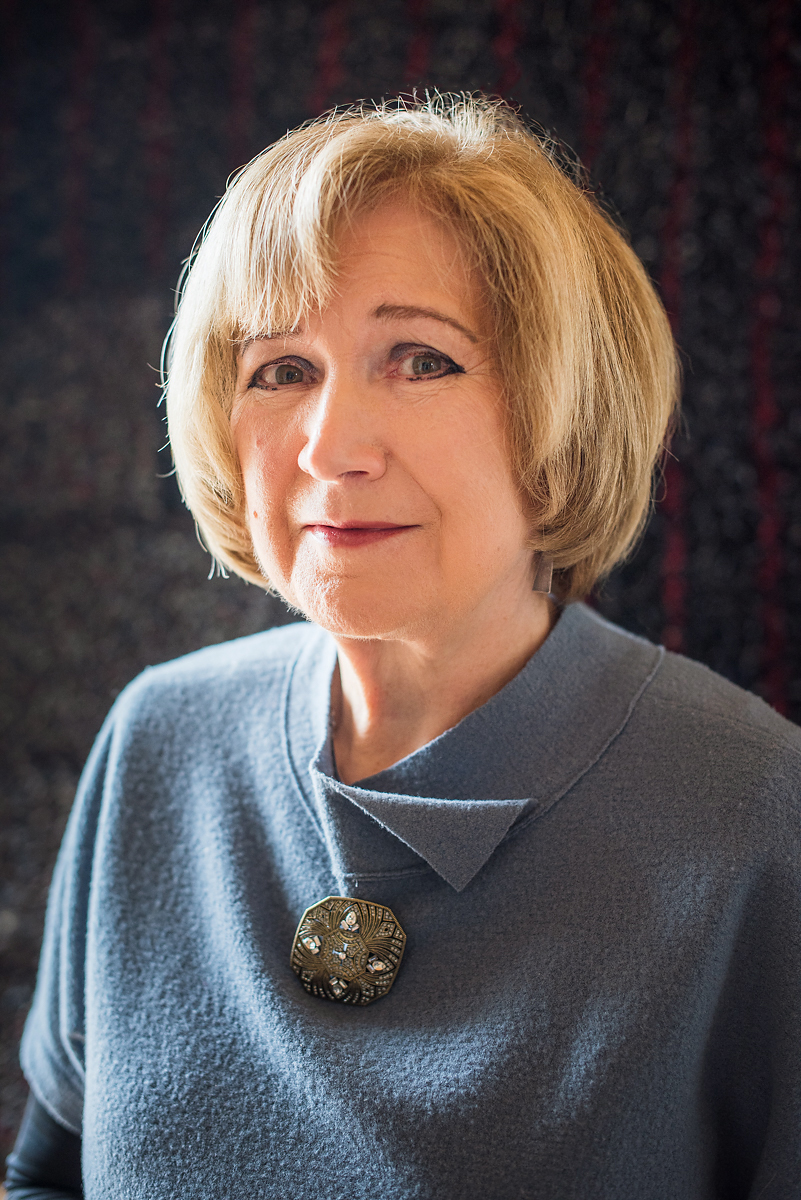
- Jorge in 2023
- Born: 18 June 1946 (age 80); Boliqueime, Loulé, Portugal
- Spouse: Carlos Albino Guerreiro
- Writing career
- Notable awards: City of Lisbon Literary Prize (1982, 1984); D. Dinis Prize (1998); Portuguese P.E.N. Club Fiction Prize (1999); APE Grand Prize for Novel and Novella (2002, 2022); Albatros International Literature Prize of the Günter Grass Foundation (2006); Luso-Spanish Prize for Art and Culture (2014); FIL Prize for Literature in Romance Languages (2020); Eduardo Lourenço Prize (2023); Urbano Tavares Rodrigues Prize for Novella and Novel (2023); Portuguese PEN Club Prize for Narrative (2023); Prix Médicis étranger (2023); Pessoa Prize (2025); Austrian State Prize for European Literature (2026); Camões Prize (2026)
- Website: www.lidiajorge.com https://mertinwitt-litag.de

Lídia Jorge GCIH GCSE (born 18 June 1946) is a prominent Portuguese novelist and author whose work is representative of a recent style of Portuguese writing, the so-called "Post Revolution Generation".

== Life ==
Jorge was born in the village of Boliqueime in the Algarve region of southern Portugal into a family of farmers and emigrants. She graduated in Romance Philology from the Faculty of Arts of the University of Lisbon and became a secondary school teacher. In this position, she spent some decisive years in Angola and Mozambique, during the last period of the Portuguese Colonial War, but most of her teaching career was in Portugal. She was a visiting professor at the Faculty of Arts of the University of Lisbon between 1995 and 1999. She also served as a member of the Portuguese High Authority for Social Communication, the country's media regulator, and was a member of the General Council of the University of Algarve.

== Publications ==
Jorge's first publication, the novel O Dia dos Prodígios [The Day of the Prodigies] (1980), is considered to be a major contribution to the new wave of modern Portuguese literature which followed the end of the Estado Novo regime in 1974. The two novels which followed, O Cais das Merendas [The Wharf of the Parties' Remains] (1982) and Notícia da Cidade Silvestre [The Wild Town Remembering] (1984) both won the City of Lisbon Literary Prize.

It was, however, with A Costa dos Murmúrios [The Murmuring Coast] (1988), a book that draws upon her experiences in colonial Africa, that the author confirmed her status as one of the leading figures in modern Portuguese literature.

In 1998, O Vale da Paixão [The Painter of Birds] won a number of awards. Four years later the novel O Vento Assobiando nas Gruas [The Wind Whistling in the Cranes] (2002) won the Grand Prize for Novel and Novella of the Portuguese Writers' Association and the Prémio Correntes d'Escritas (Prize for New Currents in Writing).

In 2007, Jorge published the novel Combateremos a Sombra [We Shall Fight the Shadow], which was launched at the Fernando Pessoa Foundation in Lisbon. This novel won the Michel Brisset Prize 2008 awarded by the French Psychiatrists Association.

In 2009, the author published the essay Contrato Sentimental [Sentimental Contract], a critical reflection on the future of Portugal. In 2011 she wrote A Noite das Mulheres Cantoras [The Night of the Singing Women].

Os Memoráveis, published in 2014, is a book about the mythology of the Carnation Revolution, recovering the theme of O Dia dos Prodígios, her first book. In 2018, she published Estuário, about the vulnerability of the present time.

Jorge has also written for the younger audience: O Grande Voo do Pardal [The Great Flight of the Sparrow] (2007) illustrated by Inês de Oliveira, and Romance do Grande Gatão [Big Tomcat's Novel] (2010) illustrated by Danuta Wojciechowska.

Although she had written poetry from an early age, it was only in 2019 that she published her first book of poems, O Livro das Tréguas. Lídia Jorge has published anthologies of short stories, Marido e Outros Contos [Husband and Other Stories] (1997), O Belo Adormecido [The Sleeping Beau] (2003), Praça de Londres [London Plaza] (2008), O Amor em Lobito Bay [Love in Lobito Bay] (2016) in addition to separate editions of A Instrumentalina (1992) and O Conto do Nadador [The Story of the Swimmer] (1992).

In 2020, under the title Em Todos os Sentidos, she gathered the chronicles she had read over the course of a year on Portuguese public radio, Antena 2.

In 2022, the writer published Misericórdia, a reflection on humanity and a tribute to her mother, Maria dos Remédios, who died during the COVID-19 pandemic. With this novel, Lídia Jorge has won several prizes, including the Prix Médicis étranger.

== Main themes ==
- the colonial and dictatorial past
- the meaning of revolutions
- tensions between modern and postmodern society
- conflicts between generations
- family breakups
- the female condition
- emigration

== Adaptations ==
=== Theatre ===
Lídia Jorge's play A Maçon was staged at the Dona Maria II National Theatre in 1997, directed by Carlos Avilez. A theatrical adaptation of O Dia dos Prodígios was also performed, directed by Cucha Carvalheiro at Teatro da Trindade in Lisbon. More recently, Instruções para Voar was performed by ACTA, at Teatro Lethes in Faro and at the Teatro da Trindade; the latter production was directed by Juni Dahr, with Jean-Guy Lecayt responsible for the scenography.

=== Cinema and TV ===
The novel A Costa dos Murmúrios was adapted to cinema in 2004 by Margarida Cardoso. The short story Miss Beijo was adapted for Portuguese public television (RTP) in 2021 and directed by Miguel Simal. The Wind Whistling in the Cranes was adapted to cinema by Jeanne Waltz.

== Representation ==
The literary agency that represents Lídia Jorge, Literarische Agentur Dr. Ray-Güde Mertin (named after the literature professor and literary agent of that name), is based in Frankfurt and is now directed by Nicole Witt.

== Academy ==
Lídia Jorge's novels are translated into several languages. Her works, in addition to editions in Brazil, have been translated into more than twenty languages, namely English, French, German, Dutch, Spanish, Swedish, Hebrew, Italian and Greek, and are the object of study in Portuguese and foreign universities. Several essays have also been dedicated to them.

The University of Algarve, on 15 December 2010, awarded her a Doctorate Honoris Causa. In 2020, issue 205 of COLÓQUIO LETRAS Magazine was dedicated to her. In 2021, number 136 of the Spanish Magazine TURIA also dedicated its main dossier to the novelist. In September of that year, the University of Geneva, in Switzerland, inaugurated the Lídia Jorge Chair and in November, at the University of Massachusetts UMass Amherst, the protocol for a Lídia Jorge Chair was signed. This Chair was inaugurated in April 2022. In March 2024 another Lídia Jorge Chair was inaugurated, this time at the Universidade Federal de Goiás, Brazil.

The University of Aveiro, on the occasion of its 51st anniversary, on December 18, 2024, awarded the Doctorate Honoris Causa to Lídia Jorge, describing the Algarve author as "probably the most international of contemporary Portuguese writers, whose books travel the world, translated into the most diverse languages".

== Tributes ==
On 17 December 2004, the Municipal Council of Albufeira inaugurated the Lídia Jorge Municipal Library in her honour. To mark the 30th anniversary of the publication of O Dia dos Prodígios, the Municipality of Loulé promoted a large bio-bibliographic exhibition, "Thirty Years of Published Writing", between November 2010 and March 2011 at the Convento de Santo António dos Olivais.

In Portugal, the then President of the Republic, Jorge Sampaio, awarded her the Grand Cross of the Order of Infante D. Henrique on 9 March 2005. The President of the French Republic, Jacques Chirac, on 13 April 2005, decorated her as a Chevalier of the French Order of Arts and Letters, being later elevated to the rank of Officer, on July 14, 2015.

In 2021, Lídia Jorge was appointed member of the Portuguese Council of State by President Marcelo Rebelo de Sousa for the period 2021–2026.

She is a regular contributor to Jornal de Letras and has written chronicles for Público and El País.

== Bibliography ==
=== Novels ===
- O Dia dos Prodígios (The Day of Prodigies) – 1980
- O Cais das Merendas (The Quay of the Parties' Remains) – 1982
- Notícia da Cidade Silvestre (The Wild Town Remembering) – 1984
- A Costa dos Murmúrios (The Murmuring Coast) – 1988 (Available in English)
- A Última Dona – 1992
- O Jardim Sem Limites (Limitless Garden) – 1995
- O Vale da Paixão (The Painter of Birds) – 1998 (Available in English)
- O Vento Assobiando nas Gruas (The Wind Whistling in the Cranes) – 2002 (Available in English)
- Combateremos a Sombra (We Shall Fight the Shadow) – 2007
- A Noite das Mulheres Cantoras (The Night of the Singing Women) – 2011
- Os Memoráveis (The Memorable) – 2014
- Estuário (Estuary) – 2018
- Misericórdia – 2022

=== Short stories ===
- A Instrumentalina – 1992
- O Conto do Nadador (The Story of the Swimmer) – 1992
- Marido e outros Contos (Husband and Other Stories) – 1997
- O Belo Adormecido (The Sleeping Beau) – 2004
- Praça de Londres (London Plaza) – 2008
- O Organista (The Organist) – 2014
- O Amor em Lobito Bay (Love in Lobito Bay) – 2016

=== Children's literature ===
- O Grande Voo do Pardal [The Great Flight of the Sparrow] – 2007
- Romance do Grande Gatão [Big Tomcat's Novel] – 2010
- O Conto da Isabelinha (Lilibeth's Tale) – 2018

=== Essays ===
- Contrato Sentimental (Sentimental Contract) – 2009

=== Plays ===
- A Maçon (The Mason) – 1997
- Instruções para Voar (Instructions to Fly) – 2016

=== Poetry ===
- O Livro das Tréguas – 2019

=== Chronicles ===
- Em Todos os Sentidos – 2020

== Distinctions ==
=== National orders ===
- Grand Cross of the Order of Prince Henry the Navigator (9 March 2005)
- Chevalier of the French Ordre des Arts et des Lettres (13 April 2005)
- Officer of the French Ordre des Arts et des Lettres (14 July 2015)
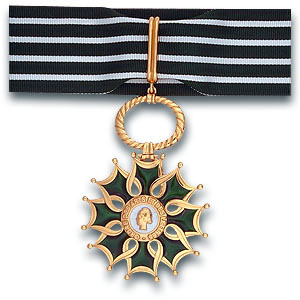
- Commander of the French Ordre des Arts et des Lettres (18 March 2025)
- Grand Cross of the Military Order of Saint James of the Sword (9 January 2026)

=== Literary awards ===
- Malheiro Dias Prize, Lisbon Academy of Sciences (1981)
- City of Lisbon Literary Prize (1982 and 1984), O Cais das Merendas and Notícia da Cidade Silvestre
- D. Dinis Prize, Casa de Mateus Foundation (1998), O Vale da Paixão
- Bordallo Prize for Literature, Casa da Imprensa (1998), O Vale da Paixão
- Máxima Prize for Literature (1998), O Vale da Paixão
- Fiction Prize of the Portuguese P.E.N. Club (1999), O Vale da Paixão
- Jean Monnet Prize for European Literature, European Writer of the Year (2000), O Vale da Paixão
- Grand Prize for Novel and Novella of the Portuguese Writers' Association (2002), O Vento Assobiando nas Gruas
- Correntes d'Escritas Prize (2002), O Vento Assobiando nas Gruas
- Albatros, International Literature Prize of the Günter Grass Foundation (2006)
- Grand Prize of the Portuguese Society of Authors, Millennium BCP (2007)
- Premio Speciale Giuseppe Acerbi, Scrittura Femminile (2007)
- Michel Brisset Prize, awarded by the Association of French Psychiatrists (2008), Combateremos a Sombra
- Latinity Prize, João Neves da Fontoura, Latin Union (2011)
- Luso-Spanish Prize for Art and Culture (2014)
- Vergílio Ferreira Prize (2015)
- Urbano Tavares Rodrigues Prize (2015)
- dst Grand Prize for Literature (2019), Estuário
- Rosalía de Castro Prize, PEN Centre Galicia (2020)
- FIL Prize for Literature in Romance Languages, Guadalajara (2020)
- Grand Prize for Chronicle and Miscellaneous Literary Writings, Portuguese Writers' Association / Loulé Municipal Council (2021), Em Todos os Sentidos
- Vítor Aguiar e Silva Literary Life Prize (2022/2023)
- Grand Prize for Novel and Novella of the Portuguese Writers' Association (2022), Misericórdia
- Eduardo Lourenço Prize (2023), Centre for Iberian Studies, Misericórdia
- Urbano Tavares Rodrigues Prize for Novella and Novel (2023), FENPROF, Misericórdia
- Portuguese PEN Club Prize for Narrative (2023), Misericórdia
- Fernando Namora Literary Prize (2023), Misericórdia
- Prix Médicis étranger (2023), Misericórdia
- San Clemente Prize (2025, Santiago de Compostela), Misericórdia
- Pessoa Prize (2025)
- Austrian State Prize for European Literature (2026)
- Camões Prize (2026)
