= Nam Van =

Nam Van is a collection of short stories by the Macanese author Henrique de Senna Fernandes. It was first published in Macau in 1978. Taking its name from Praia Grande also known as Nam Van in Chinese, written in Portuguese, the collection is an attempt to sketch out aspects of the identity of the Macanese, the mixed race community considered by the Chinese and the Portuguese to be the sons of the soil. In Senna Fernandes's stories, this group is depicted as inextricably in-between, in-between the Portuguese and the Chinese, in between a seemingly idyllic past and a fast approaching present that will see the territory transformed and their place within it rendered fragile,

The stories contained include:

- "A-Chan, A Tancareira" (which was written whilst the author was a student at the University of Coimbra in Portugal)
- "Um Encontro Imprevisto" (Chance Encounter)
- "Chá com Essência de Cereja" (Tea with Essence of Cherry)

Several of these stories have appeared in English translation by David Brookshaw in the collection Visions of China: Short Stories from Macau
