= Luuanda =

Luuanda is a book by the Angolan writer José Luandino Vieira published in 1963 by Edições 70 in Lisbon, Portugal; an English translation by Tamara L. Bender was published by Heinemann (African Writers Series No. 222) in 1980. The book is a collection of three stories, "Grandma Xíxi and Her Grandson Zeca Santos," "The Tale of the Thief and the Parrot," and "The Tale of the Chicken and the Egg."

Luuanda is a historic book, considered to have been an agent of a break with Portuguese norms in Angolan literature. For its innovative storytelling and charismatic writing, the book was widely applauded upon publication and received two literary prizes, the D. Maria José Abrantes Mota Veiga Prize, given in Luanda in 1964, and the 1st Prize for a Novel awarded by the Portuguese Writers' Society (PWS) in Lisbon in 1965. The publication of Luuanda and the acclaim it received caused a serious stir in Portugal under Salazar's rule, leading to the dissolution of the PWS by the regime.

As Margarida Calafate Ribeiro writes in the introduction to her interview with Luandino, "Luuanda gained a place in both Portuguese and Angolan history as a key moment of 'enfrentamento' [confrontation]. Its commemoration involves, for us, José Luandino Vieira sharing the history of Luanda."

== See also ==
- Censorship in Portugal
- Literature of Angola
