= Cerromaior =

1981 film

- Directed by: Luís Filipe Rocha
- Written by: Luís Filipe Rocha; Manuel da Fonseca
- Starring: Abel Vieira De Castro
- Cinematography: João Abel Aboim
- Edited by: José Nascimento
- Release date: 24 April 1981
- Running time: 90 minutes
- Country: Portugal
- Language: Portuguese

Cerromaior is a 1981 Portuguese drama film directed by Luís Filipe Rocha. It was screened in the Un Certain Regard section at the 1981 Cannes Film Festival, and was awarded the Colón de Oro at the Festival de Cine Iberoamericano de Huelva.

== Cast ==
- Abel Vieira De Castro
- Titus de Faria - Carlos
- Ruy Furtado - Doninha
- Clara Joana - Ceu
- Santos Manuel - Maltes
- Carlos Paulo - Adriano
- Emília Rosa
- Amélia Varejão
- Elsa Wallencamp - (as Elsa Walenkamp)
