= The Forest (2002 film) =

2002 film directed by Leonel Vieira

- Directed by: Leonel Vieira
- Written by: Ferreira de Castro (novel); Izaías Almada
- Produced by: Luis Méndez
- Starring: Diogo Morgado; Chico Díaz; Maitê Proença
- Release date: 1 November 2002 (Portugal)
- Running time: 105 minutes
- Countries: Portugal; Brazil; Spain
- Language: Portuguese

The Forest (A Selva) is a 2002 film directed by Leonel Vieira.

The movie won the "Best Film" at the 2003 Golden Globes Portugal.

== Plot ==
Alberto (played by Diogo Morgado) is a young Portuguese monarchist who in 1912 is exiled to Brazil. There, he is contracted by Velasco (Karra Elejalde), a Spanish overseer, to work in the heart of the forest. Alberto discovers a strange and wild world, in which the Indians, the fever and the madness of the men are daily dangers.
