= Portuguese Society of Writers =

- Sociedade Portuguesa de Escritores
- Abbreviation: SPE
- Successor: Portuguese Association of Writers
- Formation: 1956
- Founders: Aquilino Ribeiro, Ferreira de Castro
- Dissolved: 1965
- Type: Writers' association
- Headquarters: Rua da Escola Politécnica, Lisbon
- Location: Portugal
- President: Jacinto do Prado Coelho (last)
- Awards: Grand Essay Prize, Novel Grand Prize

Portuguese Society of Writers (Portuguese: Sociedade Portuguesa de Escritores; SPE) was an association of writers in Portugal, founded in 1956 and closed in 1965 by the Government of the Estado Novo.

== Establishment ==
The creation of the SPE was initiated by writers Aquilino Ribeiro and Ferreira de Castro, who, on April 30, 1954, sent a circular to all their peers proposing a meeting to discuss the creation of a writers' society.

Following meetings held on May 6 and June 2, 1954, the Statutes were approved, which, according to the legislation in force at the time, had to be subject to ministerial approval, which only occurred on July 4, 1956.

== Grand Essay Prize ==
- 1963 – Mário Dionísio for A Paleta e o Mundo
- 1965 – Armando Castro for Evolução Económica de Portugal nos Século XII a XV

== The 1965 Novel Grand Prize ==
In 1965, the SPE, chaired by Jacinto do Prado Coelho, awarded the Novel Grand Prize to writer Luandino Vieira, who was then detained at Tarrafal for his activities as a member of the People's Movement for the Liberation of Angola. The main newspapers in the country reported the award without realizing that the award-winning writer was a political prisoner. When the Censorship Services Directorate discovered the fact, they prohibited any reference to the prize.

== Dissolution ==
Following the awarding of the prize to Luandino Vieira, the SPE was dissolved by an order on May 21, 1965, from the Minister of National Education Inocêncio Galvão Teles.

That same night, its headquarters on Rua da Escola Politécnica in Lisbon was destroyed by unknown individuals. Three members of the jury were arrested by the political police: Alexandre Pinheiro Torres, Manuel da Fonseca, and Augusto Abelaira.

== Succession ==
The SPE was succeeded in 1972 by the Portuguese Association of Writers, after a difficult process of government authorization.
