= Henrique de Senna Fernandes =

Macanese writer (1923–2010)

Henrique de Senna Fernandes (October 15, 1923 – October 4, 2010) was a Macanese writer.

== Biography ==
Henrique de Senna Fernandes was born and died in Macau. One of 11 siblings of an old Macanese family, who settled in Macau over 250 years ago, he studied law at the University of Coimbra before becoming a writer. His work, written in Portuguese, evokes the atmosphere of the 1930s, 1940s and 1950s in the territory. Often focusing on the lives of characters of mixed racial origins, like the author himself, his work represents a unique viewpoint on the evolution of the territory in the twentieth century.

In the period before the Revolution of April 25, 1974, he was a member of the Macau Legislative Council, which in 1972/1973 was renamed the Macau Legislative Assembly. About the sudden fall of the Salazar regime in this revolution, he said that "it was such impossible news for us who had been raised under the regime," not least because he felt at the time that "we overseasers enjoyed a privileged situation under the old regime. We felt guaranteed by that policy. He never again participated in active political life as a deputy in the Legislative Assembly in the post-April 25 period.

Besides writing he was a teacher and director at the Pedro Nolasco Commercial School. From 1998 to 2009 he was resident of the General Assembly of CAM, operator of Macau International Airport.

In 2006, he received an honorary doctorate from the University of Macau and Medal of Cultural Merit in 2001.

== Works ==
- Nam Van - Contos de Macau 1978
- A Trança Feiticeira (The Bewitching Braid), adapted into a film of the same name
- Amor e Dedinhos de Pé (Love and Tiny Toes) 1986, adapted into a film of the same name
- Mong Há 1998
- Pai das Orquideas (Father of the Orchids)
- A-Chan, A Tancareira
