= Alberto de Lacerda =

Portuguese writer

- Born: Alberto Correia de Lacerda; September 20, 1928; Mozambique
- Died: August 27, 2007 (aged 78); London, England

Carlos Alberto Portugal Correia de Lacerda (September 20, 1928 – August 27, 2007) was a Portuguese poet and BBC Radio Presenter.

== Biography ==
Alberto de Lacerda was born in Mozambique in 1928. In 1946, Lacerda moved to Lisbon. In 1951, he began work at the BBC as a radio presenter and settled in London. He travelled in Brazil, between 1959 and 1960 at the invitation of the Brazilian Modernist Manuel Bandeira. He returned to London and worked as a freelance journalist and broadcaster. He taught European and Comparative literature at the Universities of Austin, Texas and Boston, Massachusetts from where he retired in 1996 as a Professor Emeritus of Poetics. He published in Portugal, Britain and the US and contributed to many literary publications in various countries.

He debuted in Portugal with a series of poems published in the magazine Portucale. He was one of the founders of the poetry magazine Távola Redonda, along with Ruy Cinatti, António Manuel Couto Viana and David Mourão-Ferreira. His poems have been translated into English, Spanish, German and Dutch, among several other languages. He is described as having a language with few adjectives but rich in imagery, revealing a mysterious world hidden in the ordinariness of things.

Lacerda died on the 27th of August 2007 in London aged 78. His body was found by the English art critic John McEwen, with whom he had a lunch planned.

== Published Poetry ==
- 1951 - Poemas
- 1955 - 77 Poems
- 1961 - Palácio
- 1963 - Exílio
- 1969 - Selected Poems
- 1981 - Tauromagia
- 1984 - Oferenda I
- 1987 - Elegias de Londres
- 1988 - Meio-Dia (Prémio Pen Club)
- 1991 - Sonetos
- 1994 - Oferenda II
- 1997 - Àtrio
- 2001 - Horizonte
