= Sebastião da Gama =

Portuguese poet

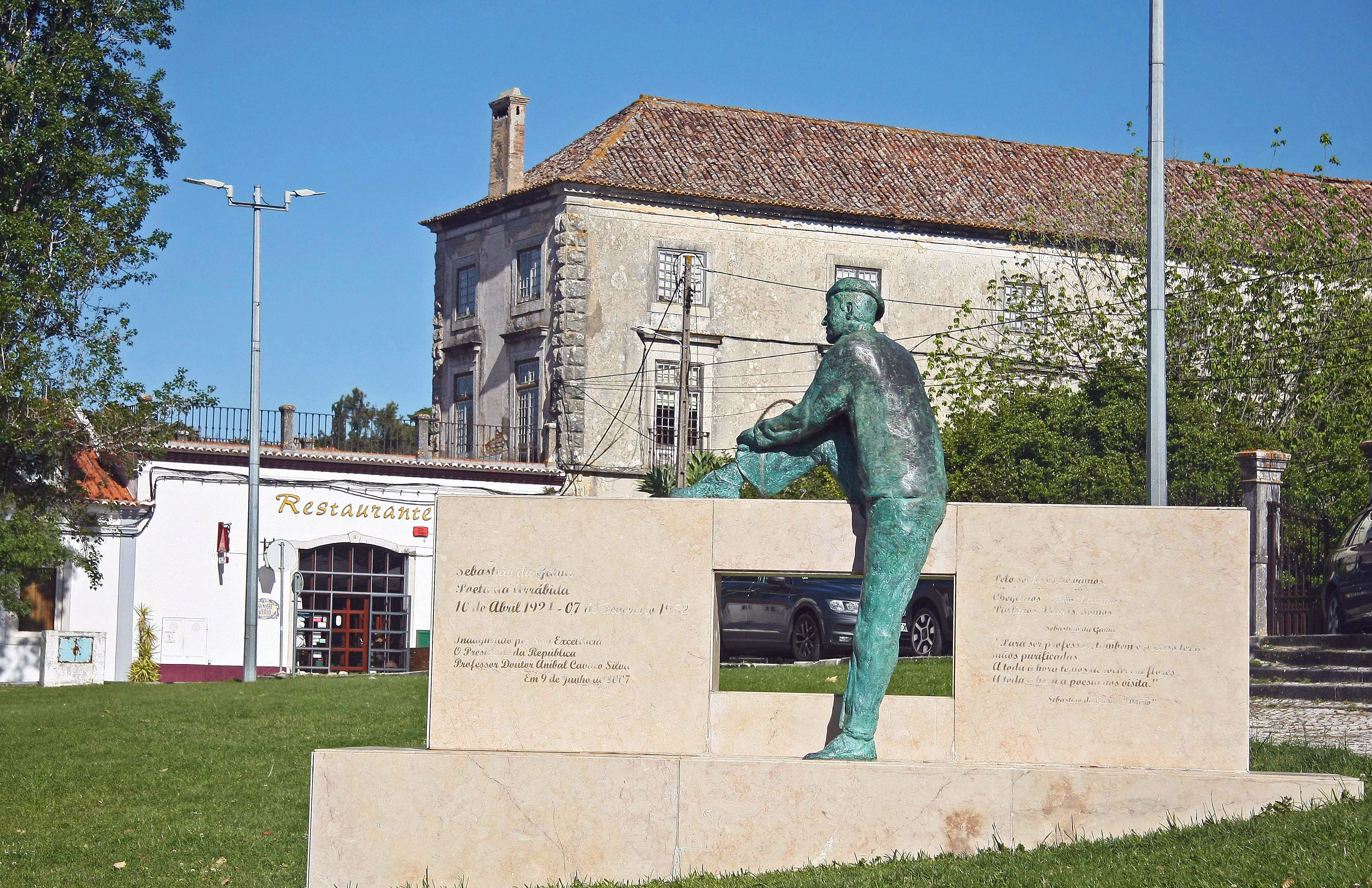
- Monumento a Sebastião da Gama - Azeitão - Portugal
- Born: Sebastião Artur Cardoso da Gama; 10 April 1924; Vila Nogueira de Azeitão, Setúbal, Portugal
- Died: 7 February 1952 (aged 27); Lisbon
- Education: University of Lisbon
- Occupation: poet

Sebastião Artur Cardoso da Gama (10 April 1924 –28 7 February 1952) was a Portuguese poet.

== Biography ==
Sebastião da Gama got a degree in Roman Philosophy by the Faculty of Letters at the University of Lisbon.

He was professor at the Veiga Beirão Commercial and Industrial School in Lisbon, later in suburban Setúbal at the Commercial Industrial School (now the Escola Secundária Sebastião da Gama) and in Estremoz at the local Commercial and Industrial School, the city where a primary school would be named after him, the modern Basic School (Escola Básica Sebastião da Gama EB2,3 Estremoz).

He published several reviews including Mundo Literário between 1946 and 1948, Árvore and Távola Redonda.

His work was about Serra da Arrábida, where he lived and led an avant garde poetic movement, and the personal tragedy of his eventually fatal tuberculosis.

He made a charter which was sent in August 1947 with other personalities to protect Serra da Arrábida and formed a movement to create the LPN (Liga para a Protecção da Natureza (Natural Protection League) in 1948, the first Portuguese ecologic association. The Arrábida Natural Park was founded in 1976.

In his Diário, edited and published posthumously in 1958, he documented his experiences as a teacher and a made a valuable reflection on teaching.

He died at the age of 27 of renal tuberculosis from which he had suffered since he was a teenager.

The parish administrations of São Lourenço and São Simão, now fully neighborhoods of Setúbal, was honored with his name in the Portuguese National Poetry Award. On June 1, 1999, Museu Sebastião da Gama was founded in his birthplace and preserves the memories of his work Poeta da Arrábida. Seven of his poems were featured along with Cape Verdean poems in Poesia de Cabo Verde e Sete Poemas de Sebastião da Gama which was released as part of the Associação Música XXI in June 2007.

== Works ==
=== Poetry ===
- Serra-Mãe. Lisboa: Portugália Editora, 1945
- Loas a Nossa Senhora da Arrábida. Com Miguel Caleiro. Lisboa: Imprensa Artística, 1946
- Cabo da Boa Esperança (Cape of Good Hope). Lisboa: Portugália Editora, 1947
- Campo Aberto (Shut Camp). Lisboa: Portugália Editora, 1951

=== Prose ===
- A Região dos Três Castelos. Azeitão: Transportadora Setubalense, 1949.

=== Posthumous publications ===
- Pelo Sonho é que Vamos, 1953
- Diário, 1958
- Itinerário Paralelo (Itinerary Parallel), 1967.

Compiled by David Mourão-Ferreira

- O Segredo é Amar (Secrets from the Sea), 1969
- Cartas I (Charters I), 1994
