= The Bewitching Braid =

1996 Portuguese Macau film

Chinese name
- Traditional Chinese: 大辮子的誘惑
- Simplified Chinese: 大辫子的诱惑
- Literal meaning: The attraction of the big braid
Transcriptions
Standard Mandarin
- Hanyu Pinyin: Dà Biànzi de Yòuhuò
Yue: Cantonese
- Jyutping: daai6 bin1 zi2 dik1 jau5 waak6

Portuguese name
- Portuguese: A Trança Feiticeira

The Bewitching Braid (Chinese: 大辮子的誘惑, Portuguese: A Trança Feiticeira) is a 1996 film directed by Cai Yuanyuan (蔡元元) and produced by Cai An'an (蔡安安 a.k.a. "Choi Unun"). It was the first film produced in Macau.

It is an adaptation of a novel written by Henrique de Senna Fernandes.

== Plot ==
The film is about a relationship between a Macanese man and a Chinese woman. The story is set in the 1930s Macau.

== Creation and conception ==
The Cai brothers hoped to make a film that showcased the territory. The production company was jointly owned by the two brothers. The government of Macau, then Portuguese Macau, and the Government of China cooperated in making the film.

The budgeting of the film, shot in 1995, was for 8,000,000 Macau patacas, with 2,000,000 patacas of that used for distribution purposes.

Most of the filming locations were in Portuguese Macau and Zhuhai.

== Cast ==
- Ricardo Carriço as Adozindo (Chinese: 阿多森杜; pinyin: Āduōsēndù)
- Ning Jing as A-Leng (Chinese: 阿玲; pinyin: Ā-líng)
- Manuel Cavaco as Adozindo's father
- Filomena Gonçalves
- Roberto Candeias as Florêncio (Chinese: 富羅倫席奧; pinyin: Fùluólúnxíào)
