= Diário de Coimbra =

Portuguese newspaper

- Type: Regional newspaper
- Format: Compact
- Editor: Adriano Lucas
- Founded: 1931
- Headquarters: Rua Adriano Lucas 3020-264 Coimbra
- Website: www.diariocoimbra.pt

Diário de Coimbra is the main newspaper of Coimbra, Portugal. Diário de Coimbra was founded on May 24, 1930 by Adriano Lucas (1883 – December 17, 1950). It is the oldest daily newspaper in Portugal that remains in the ownership of the founder's family. The founder's son, also named Adriano Lucas (December 14, 1925, Coimbra – March 21, 2011, Lisbon), assumed leadership of the group in 1950.

The most difficult period in the group's history was marked by resistance to censorship imposed during the dictatorship in Portugal. Its publication was suspended for a period of one year.

Its current editor-in-chief is Adriano Callé Lucas.
