= José Luandino Vieira =

Angolan author (born 1935)

- Born: José Vieira Mateus da Graça; May 4, 1935 (age 91); Lagoa de Furadouro, Ourém, Portugal
- Notable work: Luuanda

José Luandino Vieira (born José Vieira Mateus da Graça on 4 May 1935) is an Angolan writer of short fiction and novels.

== Biography ==
Vieira was born in Lagoa de Furadouro, Ourém, Portugal to impoverished parents. His father was a cobbler and his mother was a homemaker from a peasant background. They immigrated to Angola in 1938. The boy grew up immersed in the African quarters (musseques) of Luanda. He wrote in the language unique to the musseque, a fusion of Kimbundu and Portuguese.

Vieira left school at the age of fifteen and worked as a mechanic. He became a literary protegé of the older poet António Jacinto and a collaborator of António Cardoso, another working-class white Angolan writer of his generation. Jacinto introduced Vieira and Cardoso to the works of African Americans of the Harlem Renaissance in the United States, as well as Russian literature, such American social writers as John Steinbeck and Taylor Caldwell, and Brazilian writers such as Jorge Amado.

Vieira is best known for his work in the form of the long short story, influenced by African oral narrative. His stories, which he calls estórias, deal with the harsh realities of Portuguese rule in Angola. His best-known work was his early short-story collection, Luuanda (1963), which received a Portuguese writers' literary award in 1965. The Portuguese government banned this work until 1972 because it examined the oppressiveness of the colonial administration in Angola.

His novella A vida verdadeira de Domingos Xavier (The Real Life of Domingos Xavier) portrayed both the cruelty of the Portuguese administration and the courage of ordinary Angolans during the colonial period. The French-Guadeloupean director Sarah Maldoror adapted this work for film under the title Sambizanga. Other works by Vieira include Velhas estórias ("Old Stories"; 1974), Nós os do Makulusu ("Our Gang from Makulusu"; 1974), Vidas novas ("New Lives"; 1975), and João Vêncio: os seus amores ("The Loves of João Vêncio", 1979).

Vieira was jailed briefly in 1959 for pro-independence activism. In 1961, Vieira was arrested while travelling through Portugal with his wife and four-month-old son to a training course in London, organized by his employer, the American company EIMCO. He was transported to Luanda, where he was imprisoned in the São Paulo prison until 1964.

In 1964, Vieira, Jacinto and Cardoso were transferred by ship to the concentration camp in Tarrafal, Cabo Verde. Vieira wrote almost all of his fiction in Tarrafal. He began to publish it, not necessarily in the order in which it was written, after having smuggled his manuscripts out of the camp following the 25 April 1974 military coup in Portugal.

In 1972 Vieira and António Jacinto were released from Tarrafal as part of an attempt on the part of the regime of Marcello Caetano to improve its international image. They were ordered to live in Lisbon under police surveillance. In late 1972 Vieira's controversial short story collection Luuanda was published again in Portugal, but was soon banned for a second time.

After the fall of the dictatorship in 1974, Vieira remained in Lisbon, overseeing the publication of his manuscripts, until the end of the year. In January 1975 he returned to Angola. Between 1975 and 1992, Vieira held important posts in the cultural bureaucracy of independent Angola, notably as Secretary-General of the Union of Angolan Writers. During this time, he stopped writing, but helped many younger Angolan writers to publish. In 1992, he left Angola and has since lived a reclusive life in rural Portugal.

Vieira turned down the 100,000 Euros Camões Literary Prize awarded to him in May 2006, citing personal reasons. He announced the launch of a new trilogy of novels, De rios velhos e guerrilheiros ("On Old Rivers and Guerrillas"), but published only the first two volumes. In 2009 Vieira returned to Tarrafal to participate in a conference on the cultural significance of the concentration camp. In 2015 he published his notebooks and diaries from the twelve years of his imprisonment.

== Works ==
- A Cidade e a Infância. Written in the late 1950s. Published in Luanda in 1957, in a limited edition which was confiscated by the police. Republished in Portugal 1960.
- A vida verdadeira de Domingos Xavier. Written 1961. Circulated in clandestine editions and a French translation by Mário Pinto de Andrade. Published in Portugal 1974. English Trans. by Michael Wolfers as The Real Life of Domingos Xavier, Heinemann, African Writers Series no. 202, 1978.
- Nosso Musseque. Written 1962. Published in Portugal 2003. English Trans. by Robin Patterson, Our Musseque, Dedalus Press, 2015.
- Vidas Novas. Written 1962. Published in Portugal 1974.
- Luuanda, Written 1963. Published 1964. English trans. by Tamara L. Bender Heinemann, African Writers Series no. 222, 1980.
- Velhas estórias. Written 1964-65. Published 1974.
- Nós os do Makulusu Written 1967. Published 1974
- João Vêncio: os seus amores. Written 1968. Published 1979. English Trans. by Richard Zenith, The Loves of João Vêncio, Harcourt, Brace, Johanovich, 1991.
- No Antigamente, Na Vida. Written 1969. Published 1974.
- Macandumba. Written 1970-71. Published 1978.
- Lourentinho, Dona Antónia de Sousa Neto e eu. Written 1972. Published 1981.
- O livro dos rios. 2006
- O livro dos guerrilheiros. 2009
- Papéis da prisão. Apontamentos, Diário, Correspondência (1962-1971), 2015.
