= Manuel da Fonseca =

Portuguese writer

Manuel da Fonseca ComSE
- Born: Manuel Lopes Fonseca; 15 October 1911; Santiago do Cacém, Portugal
- Died: 11 March 1993 (aged 81); Lisbon, Portugal
- Occupations: Writer, poet
- Known for: Author of Cerro Maior
- Children: 1

Manuel Lopes Fonseca ComSE, better known as Manuel da Fonseca (15 October 1911 - 11 March 1993), was a Portuguese writer and poet. He was best known for his novel, Cerro Maior. He was eulogized as "one of the greatest writers of the century".

== Life and career ==
Fonseca was born in Santiago do Cacem, and grew up during the Spanish Civil War. He was a boxing champion in college at the School of Fine Arts. Fonseca also had a son.

Fonseca wrote both novels and poems, largely centering around the Alentejo region of Portugal in which he was born. His first poem, published in 1940, was entitled "Rosa dos Ventos", and his best-known novel, Cerro Maior, was adapted into a film by Luís Filipe Rocha and translated into several languages.

He is known for his literary representations of violence, which were viewed as "remarkable... bloody and carnal physical violence" by scholar Carina Infante do Carmo. He was considered one of the best writers of Portuguese Neorealism. Major themes of his work include social injustices, resistance, and hunger.

In 1965, he was detained due to his membership in the Sociedade Portuguesa de Escritores, which at the time he was serving as president of. The society was shuttered by the government that year after awarding their grand prize to José Luandino Vieira, an Angolan author.

He was a long-time member of the Movement of Democratic Unity, and campaigned for several presidential candidates. He served in the role of a member of the Commission for the Support of the Democratic Opposition and as a member of the Democratic Electoral Commission. He was also a member of the Portuguese Communist Party.

He died of cancer in March 1993, and was eulogized by the former head of the Portuguese Communist Party, Álvaro Cunhal, who called him "one of the greatest writers of the century".

He was named a Commander of the Military Order of Saint James of the Sword in 1983. He was also an artist, and some of his works, including his sketch of José Cardoso Pires, have survived.

== Legacy ==
In 2011, the Greater Lisbon Teachers' Union organized a drawing exhibition in honor of Fonseca.

== Bibliography ==
- Rosa-dos-Ventos (1940)
- Planície (1941)
- Aldeia Nova (1942)
- Cerromaior (1943)
- Casa no Vento (1950)
- O Fogo e as Cinzas (1951)
- Poemas Completos (1958)
- Seara de Vento (1958)
- Un Anjo no Trapézio (1968)
- Tempo de solidão (1969)
- Obra poética (1984)
- Crónicas Algarvias (1986)
