= Eduardo Lourenço =

Portuguese writer, literary scholar, and philosopher (1923–2020)

His Excellency Eduardo Lourenço GCSE GCIH GCL
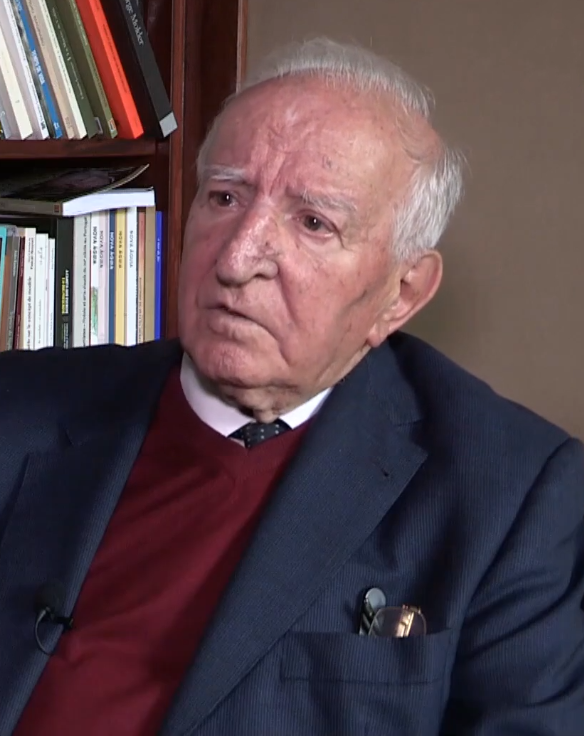
- Born: Eduardo Lourenço de Faria; 23 May 1923; São Pedro de Rio Seco, Almeida, Portugal
- Died: 1 December 2020 (aged 97); Lisbon, Portugal
- Education: University of Coimbra
- Occupations: Essayist; novelist; philosopher; writer
- Notable work: O labirinto da saudade : psicanálise mítica do destino português
- Title: Member of the Council of State
- Term: 2016-2020
- Movement: Existentialism
- Spouse: Annie Salomon
- Parents: Abílio de Faria (father); Maria de Jesus Lourenço (mother)
- Website: http://www.eduardolourenco.com/

Eduardo Lourenço de Faria GCSE GCIH GCL (23 May 1923 – 1 December 2020), best known as Eduardo Lourenço, was a Portuguese essayist, professor, critic, philosopher and writer.

== Early life ==
Coming from a small village in Beira Interior, he is the eldest of the seven children of Abílio de Faria, Captain of Infantry, and Maria de Jesus Lourenço. He moved to Guarda in 1932 and entered the Military College in 1934, one year after his father left for Nampula, Mozambique.

== Career ==
In 1940, a student at the University of Coimbra, he found there an open atmosphere conducive to cultural reflection which he would always pursue. He obtained a degree in Historical and Philosophical Sciences in 1946, and became assistant to the Faculty of Arts between 1947 and 1953, working with Joaquim de Carvalho. It was during this period that he published his first book, Heterodoxia (1949), which brings together part of his thesis, The Meaning of Dialectics in Absolute Idealism. He also collaborated in the Diário de Coimbra, publishing the Crónicas Heterodoxas.

In 1949 he did an internship at the University of Bordeaux 2, with a Fulbright grant. He was a reader of Portuguese Culture between 1953 and 1955 at the universities of Hamburg and Heidelberg, and worked at Montpellier University from 1956 to 1958. He married Annie Salamon in Dinard in 1954. After a year at the Federal University of Bahia, as a guest professor of philosophy, he moved to France in 1960.

He settled in Vence in 1965. He was a lecturer at the University of Grenoble from 1960 to 1965 and maître assistant at the University of Nice until 1987, becoming maître de conferences in 1986. He became a retired professor in Nice in 1988.

In 1989, he became a cultural advisor to the Portuguese Embassy in Rome until 1991. Beginning in 1999, he held the position of non-executive director of the Calouste Gulbenkian Foundation in Lisbon.

The Centre for Iberian Studies has created the Eduardo Lourenço Prize in his honour, awarded since 2005 and designed to honour personalities or institutions with a relevant intervention in the field of Iberian culture, citizenship and cooperation.

He was one of the main signatories of the Manifesto in Defence of the Portuguese Language against the Orthographic Agreement of 1990, an online petition that, between May 2008 (start date) and May 2009 (date of consideration by the Parliament), collected more than 115,000 valid signatures.

On November 28, 2015, the City Hall of Coimbra created the Sala Eduardo Lourenço, in the Casa da Escrita, destined to house about 3000 books of his.

== Council of State ==
He took office on April 7, 2016, as Member of the Council of State, appointed by President Marcelo Rebelo de Sousa. Lourenço would end up dying in office.

== Bibliography ==
Influenced by the reading of Husserl, Kierkegaard, Nietzsche, Heidegger, Sartre or by knowledge of the works of Dostoievski, Franz Kafka or Albert Camus, he was associated to a certain extent with existentialism, especially around the 1950s, when he collaborated in the Árvore and became a friend of Vergílio Ferreira. He never allowed himself to be embellished, however, by any school of thought, since, although he was in favour of left-wing ideas, he never abandoned a critical attitude towards that left.

With clear moral authority, he was awarded the Charles Veillon European Essay Prize (awarded in 1988 on the occasion of his work We and Europe or the Two Reasons) in the year in which he was placed in Rome as Portuguese cultural attaché.

A literary critic and essayist predominantly focused on poetry, he signed controversial essays such as Presença or Contra-Revolução do Modernismo Português? published in O Comércio do Porto (1960) or a particular study on neo-realism entitled Sentido e Forma da Poesia Neo-Realista (1968). He approached modernity in the work of Fernando Pessoa, for which he gave the print the volume Pessoa Revisitado (1973) or Fernando Rei da Nossa Baviera (1986). Indifferent to the succession of theoretical currents, and escaping both historicism and supposed objective analyses, Lourenço's perspective has already influenced other authors, such as, for example, Eduardo Prado Coelho, and is enunciated in a central book, Tempo e Poesia (1974).

== Honours and awards ==
=== Honours ===
==== Portugal ====
===== National Honours =====
- Grand-Officer of the Military Order of St. James of the Sword (July 13, 1981)
- Grand-Cross of the Order of Prince Henry (June 10, 1992)
- Grand-Cross of the Military Order of St. James of the Sword (May 21, 2003)
- Grand-Cross of the Order of Liberty (June 9, 2014)

===== Ministerial Honours =====
- Ministry of Culture Medal of Cultural Merit (2008)

===== City Honours =====
- Gold Medal of the City of Coimbra (2001)
- Homage from the Municipal Library of Maia (2003)
- Gold Medal of the City of Guarda (2008)

==== Foreign ====
- Officer of the National Order of Merit (1996)
- Knight of the Order of Arts and Letters (2000)
- Knight of the Order of the Legion of Honour (2002)

=== Awards ===
==== Portugal ====
- António Sérgio Prize (1992)
- Camões Prize (1996)
- Vergílio Ferreira Award (2001)
- Pessoa Prize (2011)
- Vasco Graça Moura-Cidadania Cultural Award (2016)

==== Foreign ====
- European Essay Prize Charles Veillon (1988)
- Extremadura Prize for Creation (2006)
- Homage at the International Congress Gardens of the World (2007)
- Tribute to the Brazilian magazine Metamorphoses (2003)

=== Academic Honours ===
==== Honorary doctorates ====
- Honorary doctorate, Federal University of Rio de Janeiro (1995)
- Honorary doctorate, University of Coimbra (1996)
- Honorary doctorate, Universidade Nova de Lisboa (1998)
- Honorary doctorate, University of Bologna (2007)

==== Others ====
- Creation of the Eduardo Lourenço Chair in the History of Portuguese Culture at the University of Bologna (2007)
