= José Cardoso Pires =

Portuguese author of short stories, novels, plays, and political satire (1925–1998)

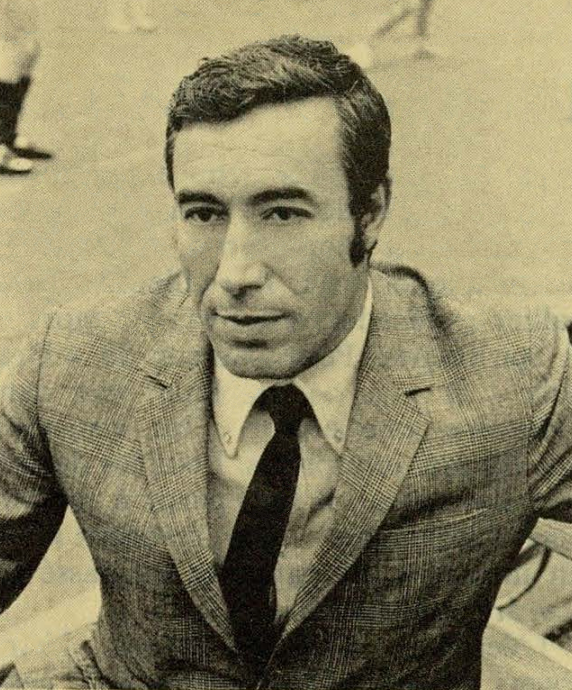
- José Cardoso Pires, 1970
- Born: 2 October 1925; São João do Peso, Portugal
- Died: 26 October 1998 (aged 73); Lisbon, Portugal
- Occupations: Novelist, short story writer, journalist, satirist
- Writing career
- Period: 1949–1997
- Movements: Neo-Realism, moving towards Postmodernism

José Cardoso Pires (2 October 1925 – 26 October 1998) was a Portuguese author of short stories, novels, plays, and political satire.

== Life and career ==
=== Early life ===
Pires was born in the Portuguese village of São João do Peso, in the westernmost end of the district of Castelo Branco near the border of Spain. His father was in the merchant navy and his mother was a homemaker. Pires studied mathematics at the University of Lisbon, where he published his first short story. He left university to join the Portuguese Navy, from which he was later discharged for disciplinary issues. His writing was greatly influenced by the city of Lisbon, the streets of which are described in great detail in his novels and short stories.

Some of his paternal family members immigrated to the United States. Pires connected to American writing styles at a time when Portugal looked to France (and somewhat to north-eastern Brazilian regionalism) for its narrative models.

In a documentary produced for Portuguese television, Pires spoke about how after he saw his first film as a boy, it led him to seek refuge in cinemas. Pires would recount the plot of the movie to his peers at school. According to Pires, this helped mold his storytelling. He also talked about the formative role of cineclubes, or film societies. These generally left-leaning associations, in his words, "contributed to the political and social education of many people."

=== Publishing career ===
After his stint in the Portuguese Navy, Pires began working as a journalist and devoted himself to writing. He developed a reputation as an author who was capable of reconciling popularity with critical acclaim.

One of his most famous works is a novel titled O Delfim published in 1968.

In 1991, he was honored with the Latin Union Prize for Literature in recognition of his literary contributions. His 1997 memoir, De Profundis, was inspired by the experience of suffering a brain ischemia a couple years prior. In that same year, he won the Prémio Pessoa.

Numerous works have been adapted into films, including O Delfim. He was awarded Prémio Bordalo de Literatura da Casa da Imprensa twice and was one of the most influential Portuguese writers of his time.

== List of works ==
- Os Caminheiros e Outros Contos (1949)
- Histórias de Amor (1952)
- O Anjo Ancorado (1958)
- O Render dos Heróis (1960)
- A Cartilha do Marialva (1960)
- Jogos de Azar (1963)
- O Hóspede de Job (1963)
- O Delfim (1968)
- Gente (with Eduardo Gageiro) (1971)
- O Dinosauro Excelentíssimo (1972)
- E Agora José (1977)
- O Burro em Pé (1979)
- O Corpo-Delito na Sala de Espelhos (1980)
- Balada da Praia dos Cães (1982)
- Alexandra Alpha (1987)
- A República dos Corvos (1988)
- A Cavalo no Diabo (1984)
- De Profundis, Valsa Lenta (1997)
- Lisboa Livro de Bordo (1997)

== Film adaptations ==
- O Delfim, directed by Fernando Lopes
- Balada da praia dos cães, directed by José Fonseca e Costa
- Casino Oceano, adaptation of the short story "Week-End", directed by Lauro António
- O Delfim, directed by Fernando Lopes
- A Rapariga dos Fósforos, adaptation of the story "Dom Quixote, as Velhas Viúvas e a Rapariga dos Fósforos", directed by Luís Galvão Teles
- Ritual dos Pequenos Vampiros, adaptation of the short story "Jogos de Azar", directed by Eduardo Geada

== Awards ==
=== Awarded to the author ===
- Prémio Internacional União Latina, Roma, 1991
- Astrolábio de Ouro do Prémio Internacional Ultimo Novecento, Pisa, 1992
- Prémio Bordalo de Literatura da Casa da Imprensa, 1994
- Prémio Bordalo de Literatura da Casa da Imprensa, 1997
- Pessoa Prize, 1997
- Grande Prémio Vida Literária da Associação Portuguesa de Escritores, 1998

=== Awarded to individual works ===
- Prémio Camilo Castelo Branco, by Portuguese Society of Writers, 1964 (O Hóspede de Job)
- Grande Prémio de Romance e Novela, by Associação Portuguesa de Escritores, 1982 (Balada da Praia dos Cães)
- Prémio Especial da Associação dos Críticos do Brasil, São Paulo, 1988 (Alexandra Alpha)
- Prémio D. Diniz, da Fundação Casa de Mateus, 1997 (De Profundis, Valsa Lenta)
- Prémio da Crítica do Centro Português da Associação Internacional de Críticos Literários, 1997 (De Profundis, Valsa Lenta)
