= Matilde Rosa Lopes de Araújo =

Portuguese activist and writer

Matilde Rosa Lopes de Araújo (1921 - 2010) was a Portuguese teacher and writer.

In 1980, she was a nominee for the Hans Christian Andersen Award.

== Selected works ==
- O Palhaco Verde (The Green Cow)
- O Reino Das Sete Pontas (The Kingdom of the Seven Pointed Stars) (1974)
- O Gato Dourado (The Golden Cat) (1977) - short stories
- A Velha Do Bosque (The Old Woman in the Woods) (1978)
- A Balada Das Vinte Meninas (Balad for Twently Little Girls) (1978) - poems
