= Luís Filipe Rocha =

Portuguese film director

- Born: 16 November 1947 (age 78); Lisbon, Portugal
- Occupations: Film director Screenwriter; Actor
- Years active: 1972–present

Luís Filipe Rocha (born 16 November 1947) is a Portuguese film director, screenwriter and actor. He has directed ten films since 1976. His film Cerromaior was screened in the Un Certain Regard section at the 1981 Cannes Film Festival.

== Filmography ==
- Barronhos (1976)
- A Fuga (1976)
- Cerromaior (1981)
- Sinais de Vida (1984)
- Amor e Dedinhos de Pé (1993)
- Sinais de Fogo (1995)
- Adeus, Pai (1996)
- Camarate (2001)
- A Passagem da Noite (2003)
- A Outra Margem (2007)
- Cinzento e Negro (2015)

== Bibliographic references ==
- (in Portuguese) O Cais do Olhar by José de Matos-Cruz, Portuguese Cinematheque, 1999
