= Jorge de Sena =

Portuguese-born poet, novelist, dramatist, and translator (1919–1978)

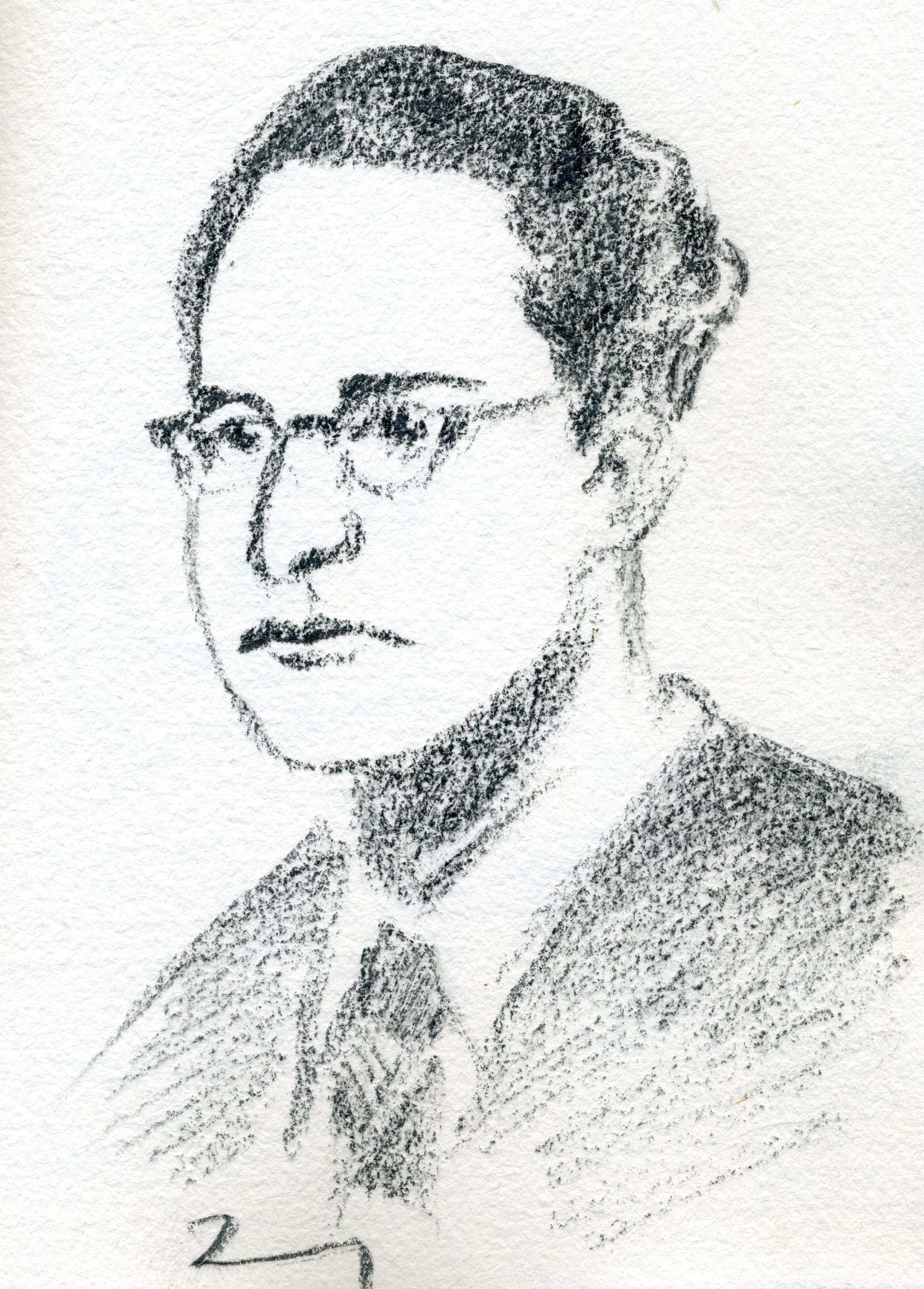
- Portrait by Victor Couto
- Born: Jorge Cândido Alves Rodrigues Telles Grilo Raposo de Abreu de Sena; 2 November 1919; Lisbon, Portugal
- Died: 4 June 1978 (aged 58); Santa Barbara, California, United States
- Education: University of Porto
- Occupations: Poet, critic, essayist, novelist, dramatist, translator and university professor

Jorge Cândido Alves Rodrigues Telles Grilo Raposo de Abreu de Sena (2 November 1919 – 4 June 1978) was a Portuguese-born poet, critic, essayist, novelist, dramatist, translator and university professor who spent the latter portion of his life in the United States.

== Life ==
Jorge Candido de Sena was the only child of Augusto Raposo de Sena, from Ponta Delgada in the Azores, a merchant marine captain, and Maria da Luz Telles Grilo de Sena, from Covilhã. Both families belonged to the middle class, the mother's being originally well-to-do but declined in fortune by the time her child was born; the father's family hailed from a line of military and political officers, the mother's from merchants. Jorge was born in Lisbon.

He received his degree in civil engineering from the University of Porto, but published his first poems at age 18. His interests were wide-ranging, including literature, intellectual history, politics, and other areas of the cultural spectrum. His liberal yet strongly independent convictions regarding Portuguese politics during the Salazar dictatorship led eventually to his exile in Brazil in 1959, and subsequently, after the military coup in Brazil in 1964, to the United States, in 1965. He became professor of literature at the Faculty of Philosophy, Sciences and Letters of both Araraquara and Assis, which later formed the State University of São Paulo. This gave him the opportunity to complete his doctorate, and that was his profession in the U.S. until he died.

He died in Santa Barbara, California in 1978. His remains were moved to the Cemitério dos Prazeres in Lisbon on 11 September 2009.

Jorge de Sena is one of the most relevant Portuguese intellectuals of the twentieth century. His output in fiction, drama, essays, and poetry is vast. He considered himself primarily a poet. His autobiographical novel Sinais de Fogo was adapted to film in 1995 by Luís Filipe Rocha, who is also the author of a documentary about Jorge de Sena.

== Works ==
Poetry

- Perseguição (1942)
- Coroa da Terra (1946)
- Pedra Filosofal (1950)
- As Evidências (1955) Evidences
- Fidelidade (1958)
- Metamorfoses (1963)
- Arte de Música (1968)
- Peregrinatio ad Loca Infecta (1969)
- Exorcismos (1972)
- Camões Dirige-se aos Seus Contemporâneos e Outros Textos (1973)
- Conheço o Sal... e Outros Poemas (1974)
- Sobre esta Praia... Oito Meditações à beira do Pacífico (1977)
- Poesia I (1961)
- Poesia II (1978)
- Poesia III (1978)
- 40 Anos de Servidão (1979, posthumous)
- Sequências (1980, posthumous)
- Visão Perpétua (1982, posthumous)
- Post-Scriptum II (1985, posthumous)
- Dedicácias (1999, posthumous)

Prose

- Andanças do Demónio (1960)
- Novas Andanças do Demónio (1966)
- Os Grão-Capitães (1976)
- O Físico Prodigioso (1977) The Prodigious Physician
- Sinais de Fogo (romance) (1979, posthumous) Signs of Fire
- Génesis (1983, posthumous)

Drama

- O Indesejado (1951)
- Ulisseia Adúltera (1952)
- O Banquete de Dionísos (1969)
- Epimeteu ou o Homem Que Pensava Depois (1971)

Essays

- Da Poesia Portuguesa (1959)
- O Poeta é um Fingidor (1961)
- O Reino da Estupidez (1961)
- Uma Canção de Camões (1966)
- Os Sonetos de Camões e o Soneto Quinhentista Peninsular (1969)
- A Estrutura de Os Lusíadas e Outros Estudos Camonianos e de Poesia Peninsular do Século XVI (1970)
- Maquiavel e Outros Estudos (1973)
- Dialécticas Aplicadas da Literatura (1978)
- Fernando Pessoa & Cia. Heterónima (1982, posthumous)

== Awards ==
- Prémio Internacional de Poesia Etna-Taormina
- Ordem do Infante D. Henrique
- Grã-Cruz da Ordem de Sant'Iago da Espada, posthumous
- In 1980, the Jorge de Sena Center for Portuguese Studies was opened at the University of California, Santa Barbara

== In film ==
In 2016 Portuguese filmmaker Rita Azevedo Gomes released her film Correspondências, about the epistolary exchange between poets Sophia de Mello Breyner Andresen and Jorge de Sena.
