= Vergílio Ferreira =

Portuguese writer, essayist, professor (1916–1996)

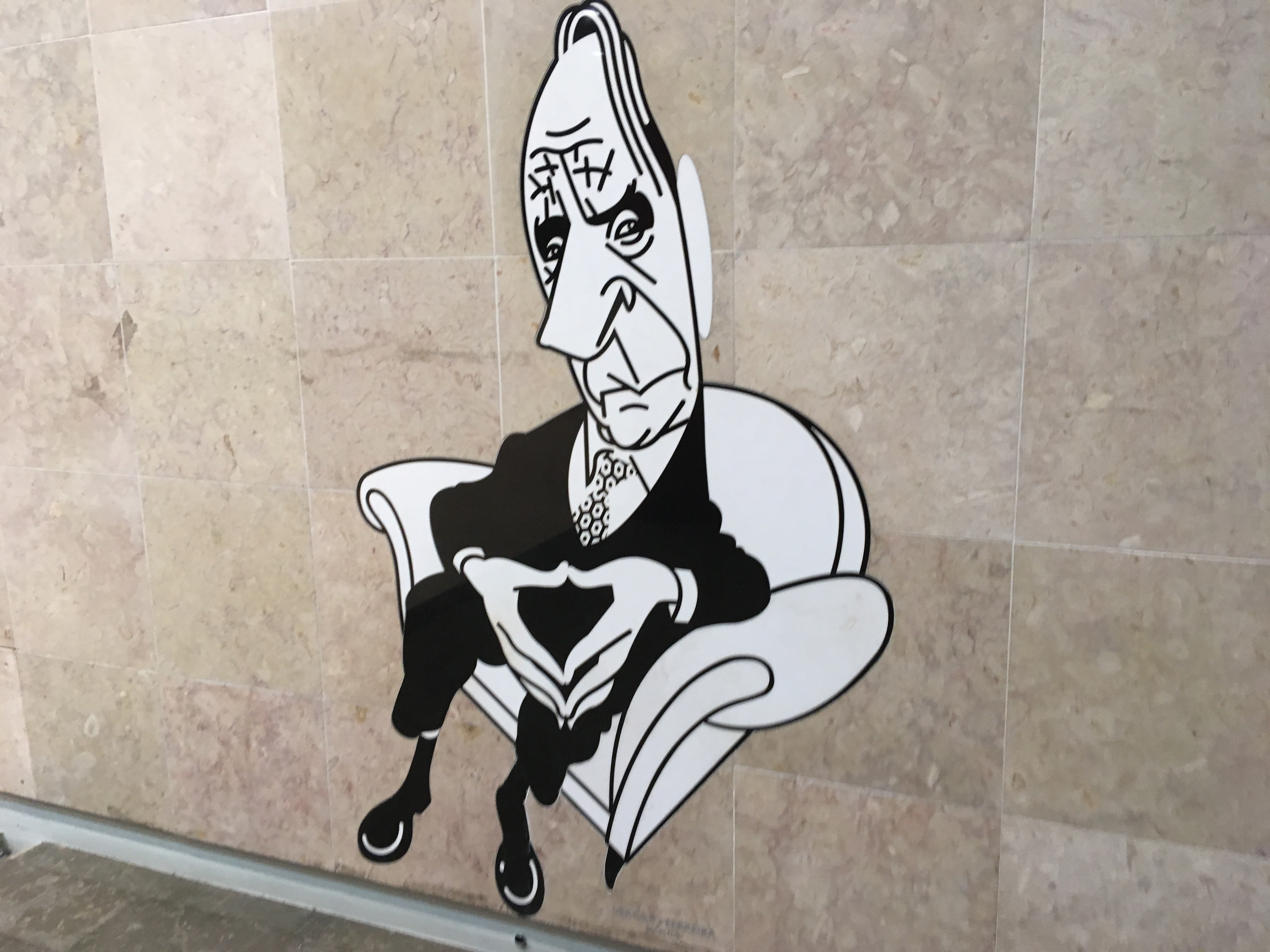
- Caricature of Vergílio Ferreira at the Lisbon Airport
- Born: 28 January 1916; Melo (near Gouveia)
- Died: 1 March 1996 (aged 80); Lisbon
- Occupation: Writer
- Known for: Manhã Submersa

Vergílio António Ferreira, JOSE (Melo, Gouveia, born 28 January 1916 – Lisbon, 1 March 1996) was a Portuguese writer, essayist, professor and a key figure in Portuguese-language literature. His prolific literary output, comprising works of fiction (novels, short stories and novellas), philosophical essays and literary diaries, are generally divided into neorealism, dominant in Portuguese fiction at the time, and existentialism.

In 1992, Ferreira was awarded the Camões Prize, a literary prize that seeks to distinguish the great names of Portuguese-language literature. His name remains linked to Portuguese literature through the annual awarding of the Literary Prize Vergílio Ferreira by the Municipality of Gouveia.

== Biography ==
Ferreira entered a seminary at the age of 10 and left when he was 16. Later he studied at the University of Coimbra. His experiences are related in his most famous work Manhã Submersa (Misty Morning, lit. Submerged Morning), which was published in 1953 and made into a film in 1980. Among his best novels is also Aparição (1959).

He worked most of his life as a teacher in several places around Portugal.

== Works ==
=== Fiction ===
- 1938 A curva de uma vida (posthumous)
- 1943 O Caminho Fica Longe
- 1944 Onde Tudo Foi Morrendo
- 1946 Vagão "J"
- 1947 Promessa
- 1949 Mudança
- 1954 Manhã Submersa
- 1959 Aparição
- 1953 A Face Sangrenta
- 1960 Cântico Final
- 1962 Estrela Polar
- 1963 Apelo da Noite
- 1965 Alegria Breve
- 1971 Nítido Nulo
- 1971 Apenas Homens
- 1974 Rápida, a Sombra
- 1976 Contos
- 1979 Signo Sinal
- 1983 Para Sempre
- 1986 Uma Esplanada Sobre o Mar
- 1987 Até ao Fim
- 1990 Em Nome da Terra
- 1993 Na Tua Face
- 1995 Do Impossível Repouso
- 1996 Cartas a Sandra

=== Essays ===
- 1943 Sobre o Humorismo de Eça de Queirós
- 1957 Do Mundo Original
- 1958 Carta ao Futuro
- 1963 Da Fenomenologia a Sartre
- 1963 Interrogação ao Destino, Malraux
- 1965 Espaço do Invisível I
- 1969 Invocação ao Meu Corpo
- 1976 Espaço do Invisível II
- 1977 Espaço do Invisível III
- 1981 Um Escritor Apresenta-se
- 1987 Espaço do Invisível IV
- 1988 Arte Tempo
- 1998 Espaço do Invisível V (posthumous)

=== Diaries ===
- 1980 Conta-Corrente I
- 1981 Conta-Corrente II
- 1983 Conta-Corrente III
- 1986 Conta-Corrente IV
- 1987 Conta-Corrente V
- 1992 Pensar
- 1993 Conta-Corrente-nova série I
- 1993 Conta-Corrente-nova série II
- 1994 Conta-Corrente-nova série III
- 1994 Conta-Corrente-nova série IV
- 2001 Escrever (posthumous)
- 2010 Diário Inédito (posthumous)
