= Mozambican literature =

Mozambican literature refers to the body of written works produced in Mozambique or by Mozambican authors This literature has been shaped by the country's diverse cultures and tumultuous history, including colonialism, independence movements, and civil war. Since Mozambique was part of the Portuguese colonial empire until 1975, there are inevitable overlaps with Portuguese literature. Mozambican literature is very young, as one can only speak of Mozambican national literature in the narrower sense since independence from Portugal in 1975.

Mozambique has literature can be traced back to the early 20th century, with the publication of the country's first literary journal, O Brado Africano, in 1918. However, it was not until the 1950s that a distinct Mozambican literary voice emerged, as writers began to challenge colonial oppression and assert their cultural identity. The period following Mozambique's independence in 1975 was a particularly fruitful time for Mozambican literature, with writers exploring themes of national identity, social justice, and post-colonialism. Mozambican literature has also been influenced by various literary movements. In the 1960s and 1970s, the Negritude movement, which celebrated black cultural identity, had a significant impact on Mozambican literature. In the post-independence period, the New Wave movement emerged, which sought to challenge traditional literary forms and explore new styles and themes.

== The concept of “national literature” ==
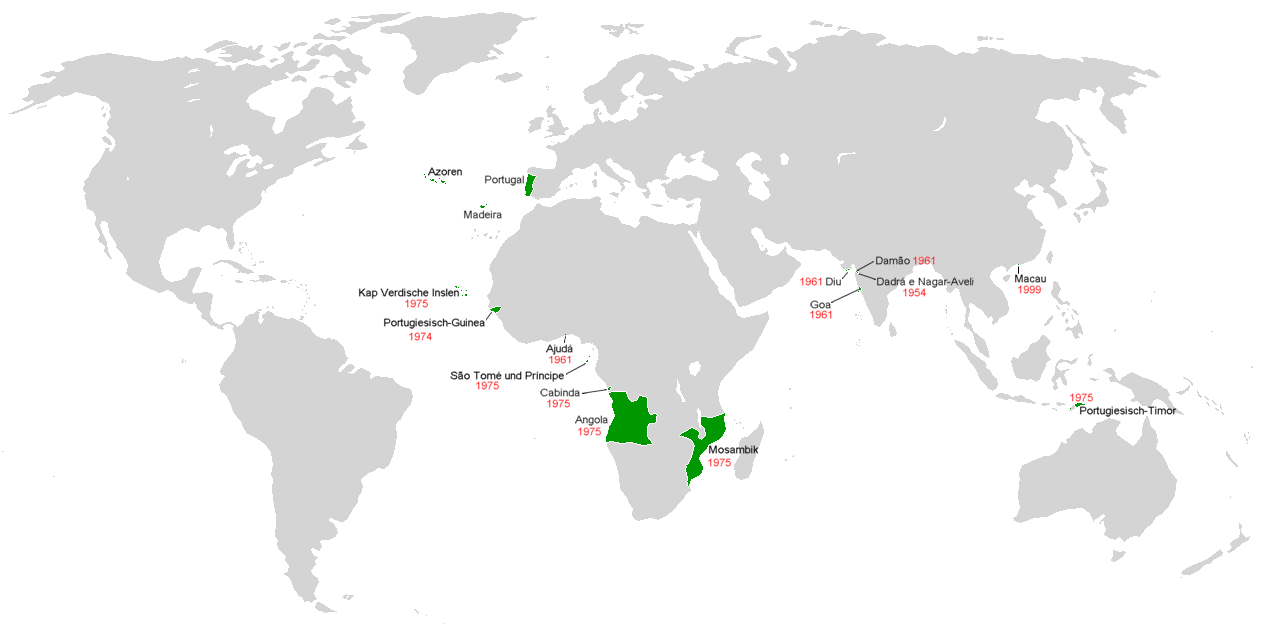
The Portuguese colonial empire 1916-1974

In the Romantic era of the 19th century, the concept of national literature emerged, portraying literature as an expression of the "folk spirit" and national culture. Mozambique, a former Portuguese colony, achieved independence after a ten-year war and the Carnation Revolution in Portugal in 1974 and 1975, respectively. Although Mozambique's statehood had been under colonial rule for centuries, the country did not experience a natural development of its national culture. Instead, Portuguese culture heavily influenced the Mozambican nation right from its inception.

One notable aspect of this influence was the adoption of the Portuguese language. With over a dozen languages spoken in Mozambique, including Bantu languages with limited written traditions, Portuguese became the "língua de unidade nacional" or language of national unity. This adoption had historical and practical reasons. The Mozambican urban elite embraced Portuguese early on, as many intellectuals studied in Portugal and assimilation to Portuguese culture offered social advancement opportunities. Additionally, since no native language was universally understood by all Mozambicans, Portuguese became the lingua franca of the country. Given the absence of written literature in native languages and the oral nature of their literary traditions, Portuguese emerged as the medium for creating a written national literature. Furthermore, Portuguese facilitated connections with other Portuguese-speaking countries like Angola, as well as former Portuguese colonies such as Brazil, Guinea-Bissau, Cape Verde, and São Tomé and Príncipe. At the time of independence, Mozambique had the highest illiteracy rate (95%) among former African colonies. The Mozambique liberation movement (FRELIMO) selected Portuguese as the language for their literacy campaign during the struggle for independence, using it to disseminate their Marxist-nationalist ideology.

During the period from 1964, when the armed struggle for national liberation commenced, until 1975, when Mozambique attained political independence, literature focused on the country's historical events, armed struggle, and revolution. Works like Craveirinha's Chigubo, published in 1964, exemplified this trend, embodying the "war cry" in the local dialect. Mozambican literature draws heavily from the rich storytelling tradition of its diverse peoples. Ancestral reverence holds significance for many ethnic groups, and folktales narrate the lives of previous generations with a blend of realism and mythology. For instance, the Makonde people have a tale about the "first Makonde," which explains why subsequent generations reside in the highlands rather than on the riverbanks. Thus, Mozambican literature reflects the cultural heritage and narrative traditions of its diverse population.

== Periodization of Mozambican literature ==
=== Oral tradition ===
The oral literary tradition of Mozambique is represented by fairy tales, proverbs, riddles and legends of different peoples of the country. People and animals act as heroes of folklore. Separately, it is worth noting the art of poets and musicians of the Chopi people, who have retained their original poetic art, which originated before colonization. The performance of poems by Chopi is accompanied by the playing of national instruments - timbilash.

=== 1854 – 1924 ===
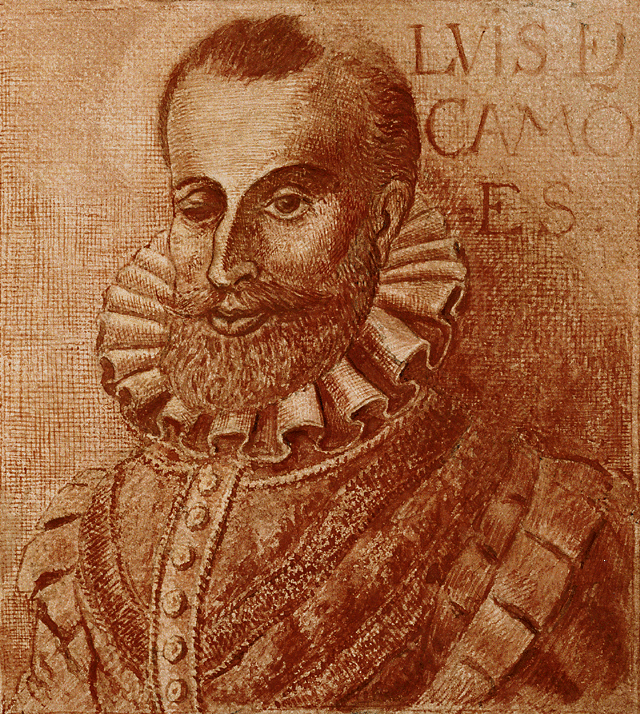
Luís de Camões mastery of verse has been compared to that of Shakespeare, Milton, Vondel, Homer, Virgil and Dante

Since the introduction of the printing press to Mozambique in 1854, printed literature made its debut in the mid-19th century. However, literary production in the colony was initially limited. One exception was Campos Oliveira (1847–1911), a Mozambican-born writer who published numerous poems while studying law in Portuguese India. Upon his return to Mozambique in 1866, he continued publishing and even founded magazines such as Revista Africana and Almanac Popular. Earlier, there were instances of writers residing in or visiting the Island of Mozambique, such as Luís de Camões and Tomás António Gonzaga.

Nonetheless, the generation of a local literature was not widespread during this time, except for the contributions of Campos Oliveira. The true emergence of literary texts in Mozambique occurred at the beginning of the 20th century. Supported by an assimilated class of intellectuals in urban areas, predominantly mestizos and mulattoes, a genuinely Mozambican Portuguese-language literature began to flourish. In 1920, Mozambique's first cultural association, the Grémio Africano, was established. Unlike later associations that were racially segregated, this association admitted both blacks and mulattoes. Numerous magazines were founded during this period, including the influential O Africano (1909–1918), founded by the Albasini brothers, José and João. After its sale in 1918, the brothers, along with Estácio Dias and Karel Pott, established O Brado Africano (1918–1974) ("Cry of Africa"), where many important Mozambican writers published their first works, which included texts not only in Portuguese but also in shironga. The authors affiliated with this journal openly advocated for the interests of black people in the colony, shaping a generation of writers and fostering African self-confidence. Many renowned writers published their poems and essays in this newspaper, including Noémia de Sousa, who edited the women's pages, and Marcelino dos Santos, who became a founding member of Frelimo.

=== Emergence (1925 – 1946) ===
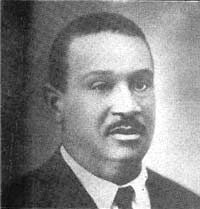
João dos Santos Albasini's photograph in O Brado Africano

In the mid-20th century, Mozambican literature experienced different phases of development. It began with the posthumous publication of João dos Santos Albasini's O livro da dor (1925), a collection of personal reflections, which marked the start of the second phase. While Juan Albasini's represented the opposing view where other authors aligned with the colonial authorities like Rodrigues Junior and Manuel de Brito Camacho.

During this period, Mozambicans, who were often looked down upon due to their limited proficiency in Portuguese, sought to imitate European literature as closely as possible. This imitation extended to the choice of genres, with poet Rui de Noronha predominantly using the sonnet form in his works, following the European tradition. Other authors were Sousa Ribeiro with Symphonia conspirante (1928), Augusto Conrado with A Perjura ou a Mulher de Duplo Amor (1931), Fibras d'um coração (1933) and Divagações (1938).

However, the establishment of the Estado Novo in 1933 and the subsequent censorship hindered the development of Mozambican national literature. Freedom of expression and the press were severely restricted, especially when compared to French and British colonies. Consequently, Mozambican literary developments were scarcely recognized outside the country. Nevertheless, the repression fueled the politicization of literature and the growth of an African consciousness. This phase concluded in 1946 with the posthumous publication of Rui de Noronha's Sonetos.

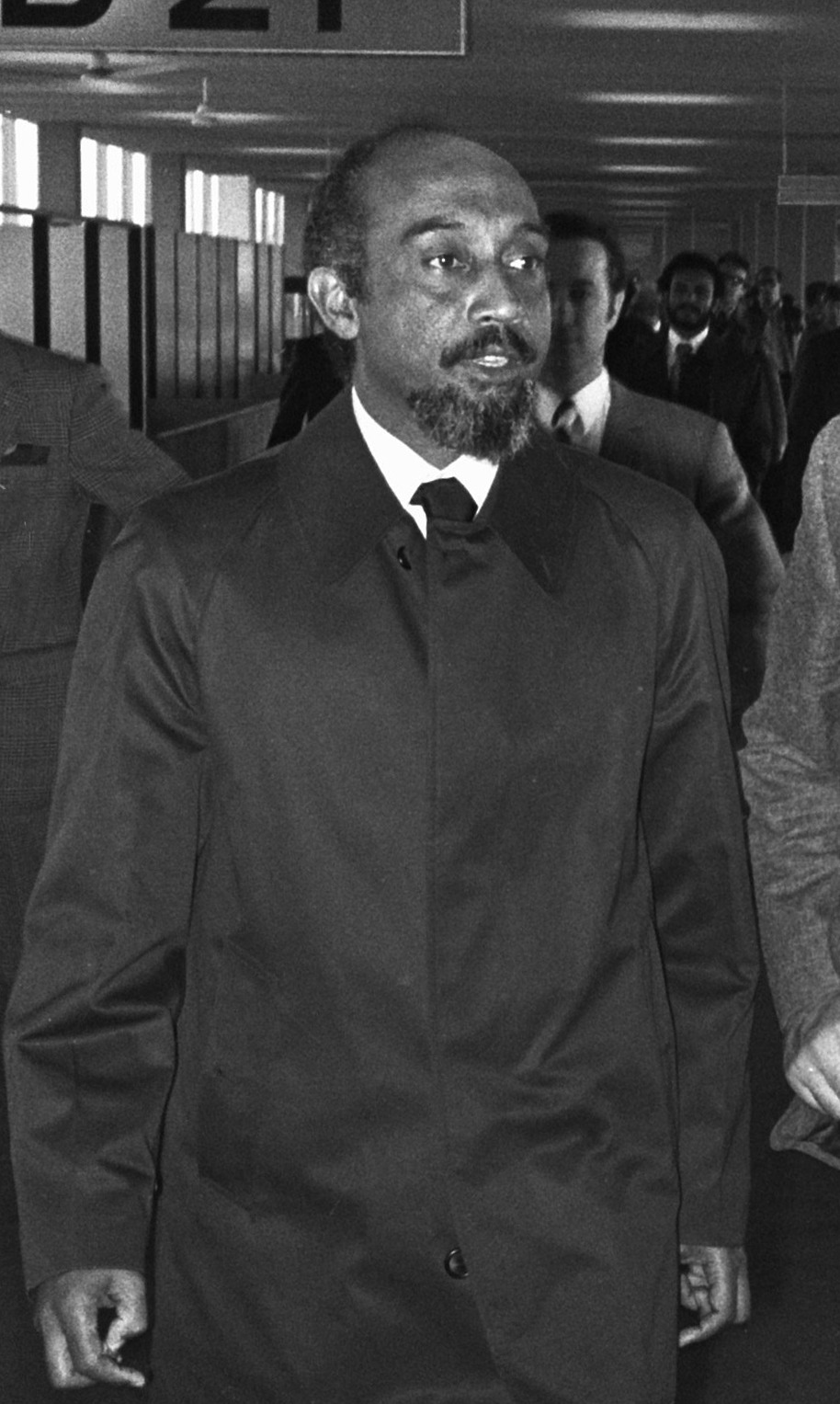
Poet Marcelino dos Santos

The literature produced in Mozambique, like other African literature in countries colonized by Portugal, was an extension of Portuguese literature. In written form, literary production was consolidated from the 1940s onwards through periodicals published by intellectuals and writers, generally challenging Portuguese colonialism, such as the "Literary Shout" that circulated in the country between 1918 and 1974 with texts by Rui Nogar, Marcelino dos Santos, José Craveirinha, Orlando Mendes and Virgílio Lemos, between others. In the 19th century, the press and literature were close, the former being a professional alternative for writers who could not survive from literary production. José Craveirinha, considered the father of Mozambican literature. From 1945 to 1965 he was the most read author in Mozambique.

The Négritude movement had been founded in 1934 by Léopold Senghor, Aimé Césaire and Léon Damas. Her central concern was the return to African culture. The fundamental difference between Africa and Europe was highlighted. Africa was seen as the antipode of Europe and idealised as "Mother Africa". The Négritude understood music and dance as specific forms of expression of African culture. This essentialist, i.e., overemphasising the importance of skin colour for the development of a certain culture, view of African culture and "the African as such" ignored the social, economic, cultural and political peculiarities of the various African countries, but was extremely effective to arouse the emerging national feeling of the colonised Africans. A significant element of this movement was the valorisation of orality as a form of African literature. To this day, the “oral tradition” plays a central role in Mozambican literature. In addition to emphasizing one's Africanness, it is articulated by the rejection of colonialism and the desire for freedom and independence. The rejection of colonialism extended to Lusomo-Zambic authors such as Rui Knopfli or Orlando Mendes.

=== Emancipation (1946 – 1963) ===
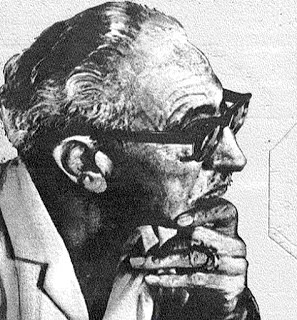
Orlando Mendes's Portrait

Prior to the 1940s, Mozambican literature was heavily influenced by European literature, but a comprehensive reorientation took place around 1946. Mozambican writers, influenced by Portuguese neorealism and the negritude movement, started focusing on the differences between Mozambique and the Portuguese colonial rulers, gradually emancipated itself. The Moçambicanidade can be considered a specific form of expression of negritude in Mozambique. After the Mozambican elite had hitherto largely adapted to the whites, they now increasingly advocated a separation of African and European ideas. Portuguese colonialism was increasingly rejected, including by whites like Rui Knopfli and Orlando Mendes. Noémia de Sousa and José Craveirinha were also important figures during this period, advocating for an independent Mozambican literature.

One of the most important women writers was Noémia de Sousa. She is considered the main representative of the Moçambicanidade (or Mozambicanism). Probably unaware of French Négritude, she combined Neorealism with concepts of North American Black Renaissance, Haitian Indigenism, and Cuban Negrism. She published all her poems between 1948 and 1951. When she had to leave the country due to political repression in 1951, she left a notebook with 43 poems, which were published in 1988 as an anthology entitled "Sangue negro". Her plea for an independent Mozambican literature had a strong influence on the Mozambican poets of the 1950s. Another representative of the Moçambicanidade was José Craveirinha. He is considered the godfather of Mozambican literature, as his tenure stretched from the 1940s to his death in 2003. He shaped generations of Mozambican writers with his extensive work and was the most widely read author in Mozambique between 1945 and 1965. Craveirinha is now regarded as Mozambique's most significant poet and received the Camões Award in 1991.

This reorientation was also reflected in the literature. The motif of Mãe-África (Mother Africa) or the recurring adjective negro (black) can often be found in the literature of this time. In addition to emphasising one's own Africanness, the black skin color, the literature now also took up African stylistic elements more than in the previous phase. She thereby articulated the rejection of colonialism and the desire for freedom and independence.

At the same time, in his poems Rui de Noronha criticized colonialism and was influenced by the oral tradition. Rui de Noronha emerged as a pioneer of truly Mozambican poetry, addressing the plight of blacks and mestizos in his works and critiquing the negative aspects of colonialism. During the colonial period, Mozambican literature began to address nationalist themes. Many future writers pursued education abroad, primarily in Portugal and France. In 1941 the journalist Rui Knopfli founded the magazine Itinerário (1941–1955), which deals with the social, literary and cultural problems of Mozambique and contributed to the emergence of a national identity.

Due to the political repression, this phase of Mozambican literature is strongly marked by the formation of different groups. One such group was the Casa dos Estudantes do Império, an association of Portuguese, Angolan, Cape Verdean and Mozambican students in Lisbon that had existed since 1944 and campaigned for the interests of the colonies. From 1948, the nationalistically minded Mensagem magazine was published at irregular intervals.

In addition to these two great poets of the Moçambicanidade, the following authors were important: João Dias, whose work Godido e outros contos, published posthumously in 1952, is considered the first fictional work of Mozambican literature, in which poetry had previously dominated. The poet Rui Nogar, who although did not publish a book of his own, continuously published poetry in magazines. The already mentioned Rui Knopfli, whose first volume of poetry was published in 1959 with the title O país dos outros. In addition, the writers Virgílio de Lemos, Ruy Guerra, Fonseca Amaral, António Bronze and Orlando Mendes should be mentioned.

In 1952, the only issue of the magazine Msaho appeared, which means an African dance in Chope. The magazine was banned by the censors after the first issue because of its critical and nationalistic content. Next to the Mozambicans Noémia de Sousa, Alberto Lacerda, Duarte Galvão and Ruy Guerra, the Portuguese Augusto dos Santos Abranches, Cordeiro de Brito and Reinaldo Ferreira were also involved in the publication of Time Step. In addition to those mentioned, other magazines were founded that criticised the Salazar regime: Moçambique 58/59 (supplement to the Notícias), A Voz de Moçambique (1960–1975) and Paralelo 20 (1957–1961, 11 issues).

The high point of this phase is the appearance of the anthology Poetas de Moçambique in 1960 published in Lisbon with 38 poems by 23 poets, edited by Mozambicans in Lisbon who had worked for Itinerário and O Brado Africano. Contrary to the prevailing idea that Mozambique was part of Portugal, the title made it clear that Mozambique was seen as something in its own right. In the course of the publication of the new edition in 1962, a dispute arose between Rui Knopfli, Rodrigues Júnior and the editor of the anthology over the question of who could be considered a European and who a Mozambican writer. The decisive factor is not the color of the skin, but the content of the works, which can be seen from the fact that numerous whites were involved in the freedom struggle of the colored Mozambicans.

In 1963, the Núcleo dos Estudantes Secundários Africanos de Moçambique (NESAM) (Circle of African Students of Mozambique) was founded in the Mozambique capital of Lourenço Marques (now Maputo). The main representatives of this group were Marcelino Comiche, Albino Magaia and Armando Guebuza. It was a cultural association that sought study grants for black Mozambicans, organised lectures, panel discussions and film screenings and maintained its own library. From 1965, legal activity in the cultural field was no longer possible and the association was forbidden.

=== Struggle for independence (1964 – 1981) ===
In 1962, the first party congress of the Frente da Libertação de Moçambique (FRELIMO) (Mozambique Liberation Front) was held in Dar es Salaam, Tanzania. This Marxist-leaning party called for Mozambique's independence from Portugal and led the struggle against the colonial power from 1964 to 1975. Numerous writers sympathized with the movement and some took on posts within the party. Many writers, such as José Craveirinha and Rui Nogar, were arrested by the Portuguese secret police (PIDE) because of their membership in FRELIMO. With the beginning of the armed war of independence in 1964, this phase of Mozambican literature ended. During Mozambique's struggle for independence, Frelimo guerrillas wrote and published numerous poems about their fight. Marcelino dos Santos emerged as one of the most prominent poets of that time. The struggle for independence marked a turning point in Mozambican literature. However, the armed war of independence that began in 1964 brought an end to this phase of Mozambican literature.

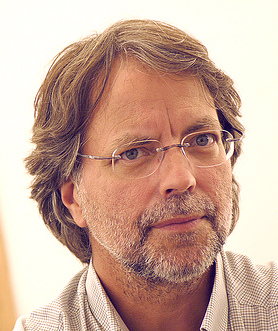
Mia Couto, author of "Terra La sonnambula", one of the top 12 "Africa's 100 Best Books of the 20th Century"

Following independence in 1974, a civil war ensued, during which new writers like Mia Couto, Ungulani Ba Ka Khosa, Heliodoro Babtista, and Eduardo White emerged. Couto is an influential figure in Mozambican literature, with his novels being translated into several languages, including Finnish. Couto's works often incorporate elements of magical realism and draw on Mozambican folklore and mythology. Couto was shortlisted for the International Booker Prize for his novel Confession of the Lioness and in 2013 won the Camões prize. In 2014, he won the Neustadt International Prize for Literature for his novel Sleepwalking Land.

=== Modern literature (1982 – ) ===
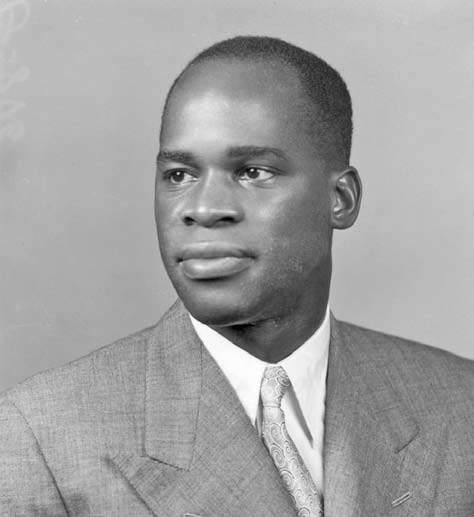
Eduardo Mondlane, author of The Fight for Mozambique, one of Africa's 100 Best Books of the 20th Century

In 1982, the Mozambican Writers' Association was created with the poets José Craveirinha, Prize winner Luís de Camões, Albino Magaia, Eusébio Sanjane and others. Notable contemporary authors include Lília Momplé and Paulina Chiziane, whose novel "Balada de Amor ao Vento" was the first published novel by a Mozambican woman. Other notable authors from Mozambique include Heliodoro dos Santos Baptista, Rui Knopfli, and Luís Bernardo Honwana have explored themes such as gender inequality, race relations, and the impact of colonialism on Mozambican society.

Albina Magaya should be mentioned among other Mozambican writers, Jorge Rebelo, Reinaldo Ferreiro, Alberto di Lacerdu, Ruya Knopfli, Malangatanu Ngwenya, Armand Guebuzu, Paulin Schiziana and others. Critics also play an important role in Mozambican literature, among them Eugenio Lisbois and others. Different groups and associations, like Casa dos Estudantes do Império and Núcleo dos Estudantes Secundários Africanos de Moçambique, played a significant role in promoting literature and cultural activities.

The Africa's 100 best books of the 20th Century, organized by the famous Africanist Ali Mazroui, in 2002 named among the laureates the works of such Mozambican writers as José Craveirinha, Luis Bernardo Onwana, Ungulani Ba Ka Khosa, Eduardo Mondlane, and Mia Coutu's novel "Terra Somnambula" even got into the top twelve works. However, only about 20 books are published annually in the country, and the editions are mostly only a few hundred.

== Themes ==
Mozambican literature explores themes of independence, colonialism, cultural diversity, and gender inequality. Writers delve into the impact of colonialism on society, the challenges of multicultural nation-building, and the experiences of Mozambican women who defy patriarchal norms. The development of literature in Mozambique was hindered by censorship and repression by colonial authorities. Opportunities for Mozambicans to pursue higher education in Europe and Brazil were limited until after World War II.

During the colonial period, the authorities imposed censorship restrictions and actively targeted writers with police forces, hindering the literary development. Only after World War II did individual Mozambicans have increased access to higher education opportunities in Europe and Brazil. The struggle for independence and the consequences of colonialism are recurring themes in Mozambican literature, as explored by writers like José Craveirinha and Luís Bernardo Honwana. Decolonization is a pervasive theme in Mozambican literature, representing the historical, social, and cultural transformations that occurred during and after the struggle for independence. Through their literary works, Mozambican writers have contributed to the collective memory, understanding, and reflection on the process of decolonization and its ongoing significance for the nation.

Up to independence, Mozambique was still far from a "literary system", a concept created by the theorist Antonio Cândido, according to which a literary system comes into being when a group of writers writes for an audience that reacts by influencing them to produce new works, and so on.

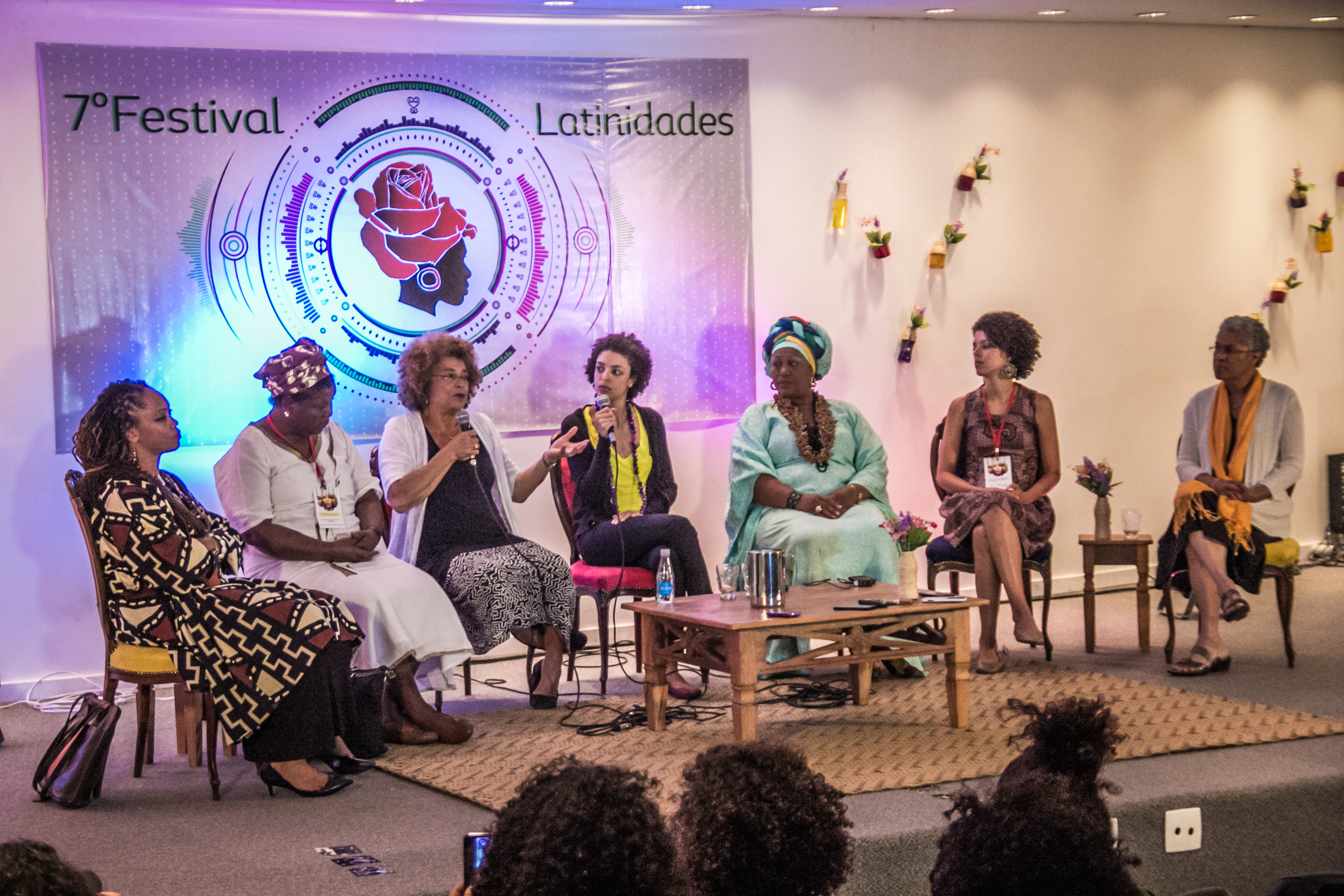
Press Conference, during the Festival Latinidades in 2014, with guests (from left to right) Shirley Campbell Barr (Costa Rica), Paulina Chiziane (Mozambique), Angela Davis (USA), Unknown, Ana Maria Gonçalves (Brazll), Marlene Tello (Colombia), and Patricia Hill Collins (USA)

Gender inequality and women's empowerment are also prominent themes in Mozambican literature. Writers like Paulina Chiziane delve into the experiences of Mozambican women and challenge patriarchal norms. The Negritude movement, which celebrated black cultural identity, had a significant influence on Mozambican literature during the 1960s and 1970s. In the post-independence period, the New Wave movement emerged, aiming to challenge traditional literary forms and explore new styles and themes.

Cultural diversity is another important theme in Mozambican literature. The country is home to numerous ethnic groups, each with its own traditions, languages, and customs. Writers have delved into the complexities of cultural interactions, highlighting the challenges and opportunities of building a national identity in a multicultural context.

== See also ==
- List of Mozambican writers
- History of Mozambique
