= Vila Algarve =

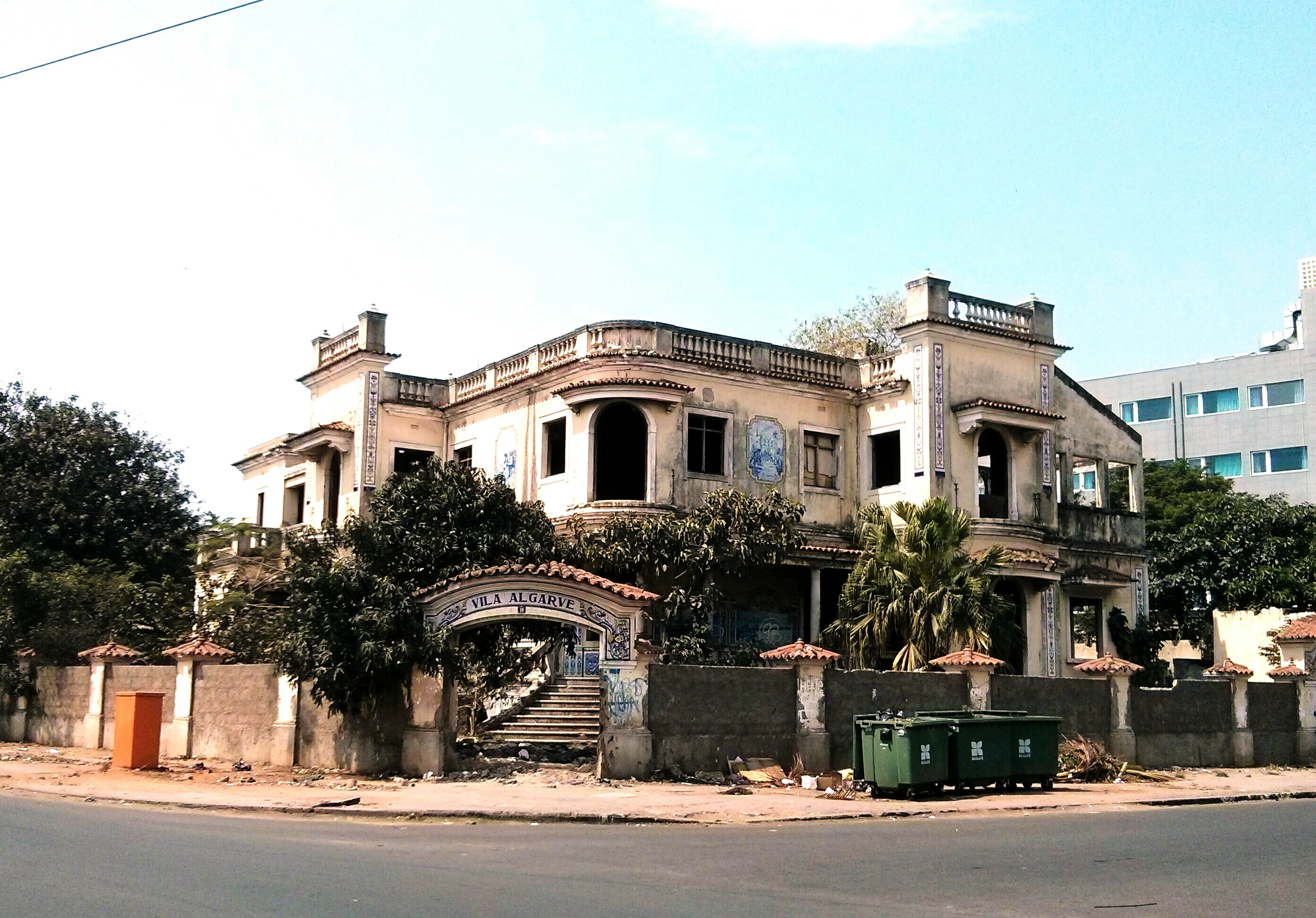
- Vila Algarve
- Interactive map of Vila Algarve

General information
- Coordinates: 25.973956°S 32.59094°E

Vila Algarve is a residential house in the Mozambican capital Maputo. Built in 1934 and later protected as a listed building, the building housed the Portuguese secret police PIDE/DGS until the end of the Portuguese colonial period in Mozambique. It is located at the intersection of Avenida Mártires da Machava and Avenida Ahmed Sekou Touré.

== History ==
The building was erected in 1934 as a residence by Portuguese. Remarkable are the azulejos, as a rare example of naturalistic decorated tiles from the time of the beginning of the twentieth century – alongside the Historicism architecture.

With the start of the colonial war in the then Portuguese colonies of Guinea, Angola and Mozambique, the Portuguese secret police PIDE extended their activities to the territories of the colonies. The PIDE confiscated the building and established its seat there. During the colonial war many resistance fighters were tortured in this building. The Mozambican poet José Craveirinha tells of his experiences in the house in three of his works. Other known inmates were, among others, Rui Knopfli and Malangatana Ngwenya.

After the independence of Mozambique, the building remained empty owing to its past; including the homeless. In 1999 the Mozambican Lawyers Association acquired the building and planned to set up its headquarters there. The cost was estimated to be 400,000 euros. Later, the association withdrew from its plans and handed over the building to the Ministry of Culture. On behalf of the Ministry of Resistance, a "Museum of the Liberation of Mozambique" is to be set up there.

Since 2011 the building is in the pre-selection for a memorial list for Maputo. In the Portuguese Monuments Database Sistema de Informação para Património Arquitectónico, which also includes works of former Portuguese colonies, it is registered with the number 31730.

== See also ==
- Outline of Mozambique
