= Culture of Mozambique =

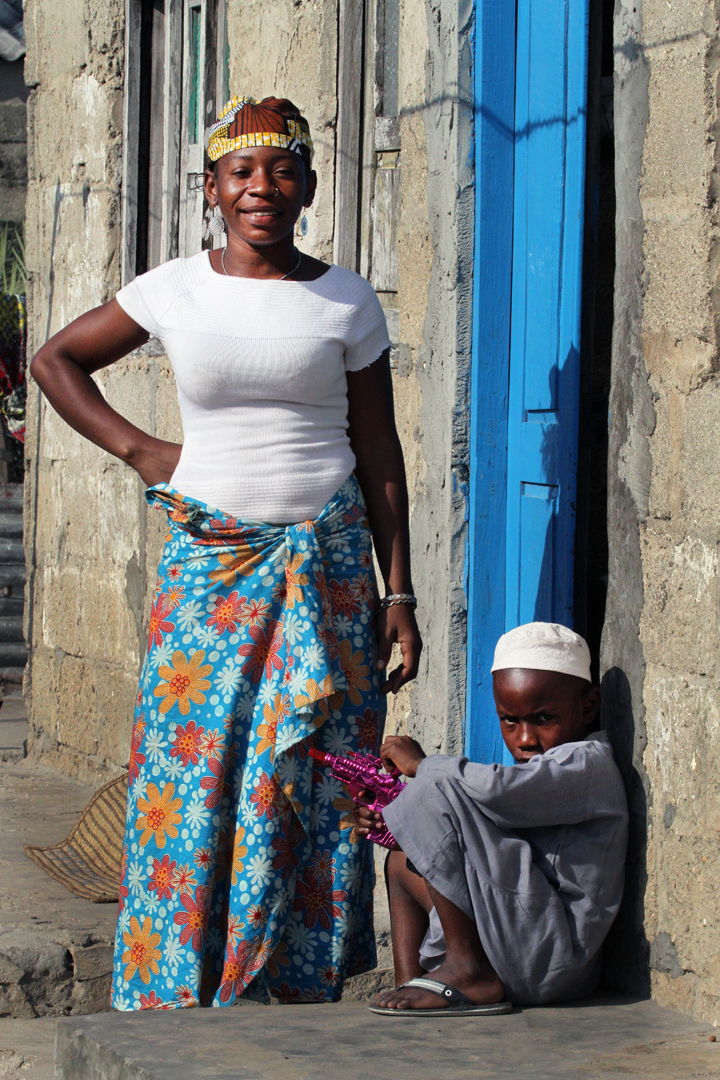
Mozambican children. The girl is wearing a traditional Mozambican capulana.

The culture of Mozambique is in large part derived from its history of Bantu, Swahili, and Portuguese rule, and has expanded since independence in 1975. The majority of its inhabitants are black Africans. Its main language is Portuguese. Its median religion is Roman Catholicism, but only about 40% of the inhabitants are Christian. It has a rich history in the areas of arts, cuisine, and entertainment.

== People ==
The main ethnic groups in Mozambique are Makhuwa, Tsonga, Makonde, Shangaan, Shona, Sena, Ndau, and other indigenous groups. There are approximately 45,000 Europeans (mainly Portuguese), and 15,000 South Asians who live in Mozambique. The main religious groups are Christian (57%) and Muslim (20%), with the remainder subscribing to Indigenous African religion and other beliefs.

Health is a large concern in Mozambique. With limited resources and funds, the life prospects for Mozambicans are relatively low when placed in comparison to other nations, and comparable when compared to neighboring states. The 2016 infant mortality rate was calculated at 67.9/1,000. The overall life expectancy is approximately 55 years.

The majority of Mozambicans work in agriculture, at 81% of the population. The remaining workforce is split between industry (6%) and services (13%).

Mozambique distinguishes itself from most other African countries through its bilineal naming conventions, which routinely incorporate both maternal and paternal surnames into citizens' full legal names as they appear on national IDs and passports, thus indicating an element of partial matrilineality.

== Languages ==
The official language is Portuguese, although English is sometimes spoken in major cities such as Maputo and Beira. According to the 2007 census, 50.4% of the national population aged 5 and older (80.8% of people living in urban areas and 36.3% in rural areas) are fluent in Portuguese, making it the most widely spoken language in the country. The other languages spoken in Mozambique include Emakhuwa (at 25.3%), Xichangana (at 10.3%), Cisena (at 7.5%), Elomwe (at 7%), EChuwabo (at 5.1%), and a variety of other languages.

== Religion and education ==
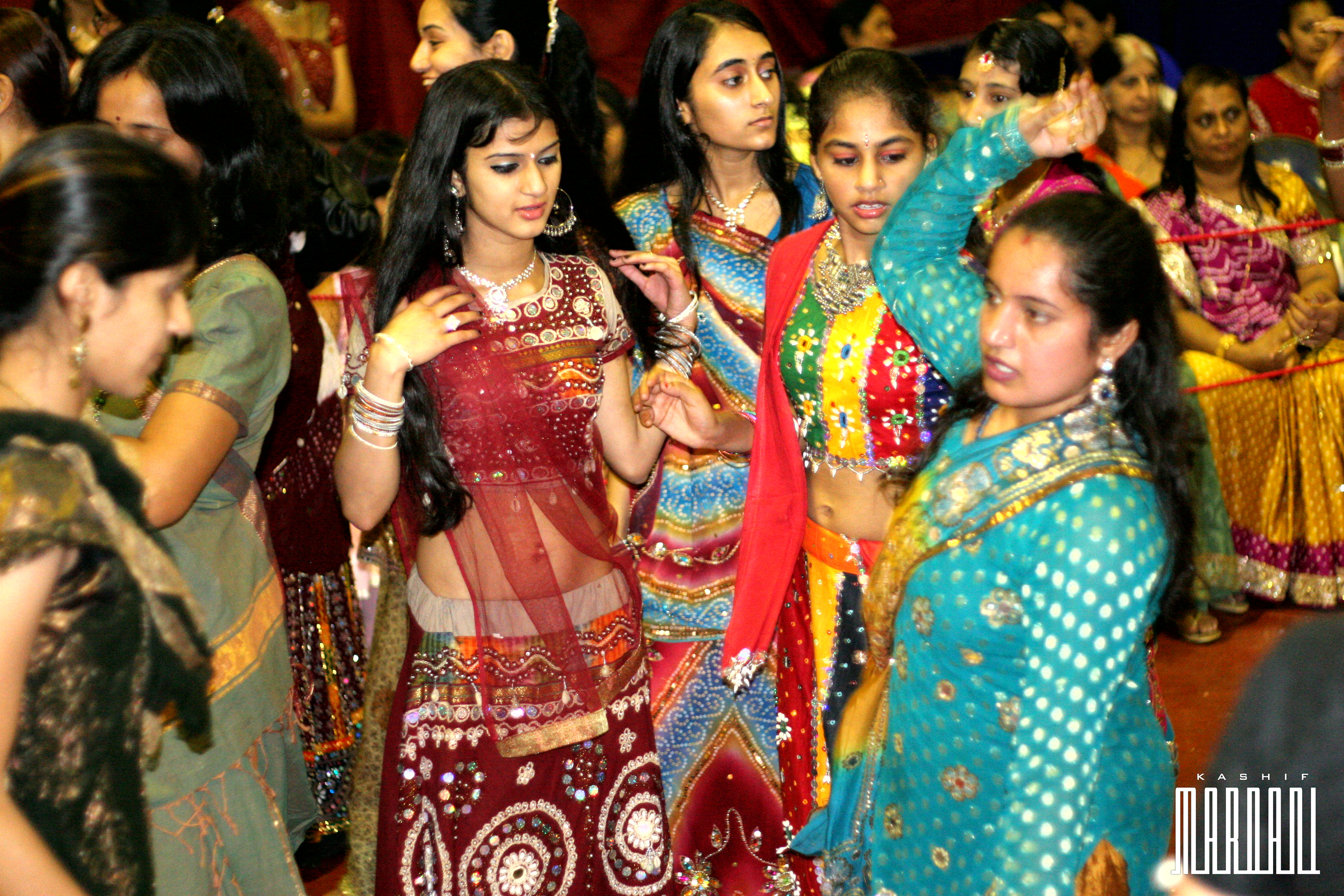
Hindu Navratri dancers in Maputo, Mozambique

Most of the people in Mozambique practice native beliefs and are Christians, mostly Roman Catholics and some Protestants. Christianity is a Portuguese influence. A few Muslims (mostly Arabs and Blacks in northern part of the country), Buddhists (mostly Mahayana and Chinese), and Hindus (mainly Indian and Pakistani immigrants) are also important.

Only 1/3 of Mozambicans over the age of 15 are able to read and write. Primary education in Mozambique is free. However, secondary education is not free. At the end of 1995, about 60% of primary school aged children attended Primary School. A small percentage of these students, about 7%, move onto secondary school.

At the end of the 1995 calendar year, there were approximately seven thousand students that attended one of the three higher level institutions.

== Arts ==
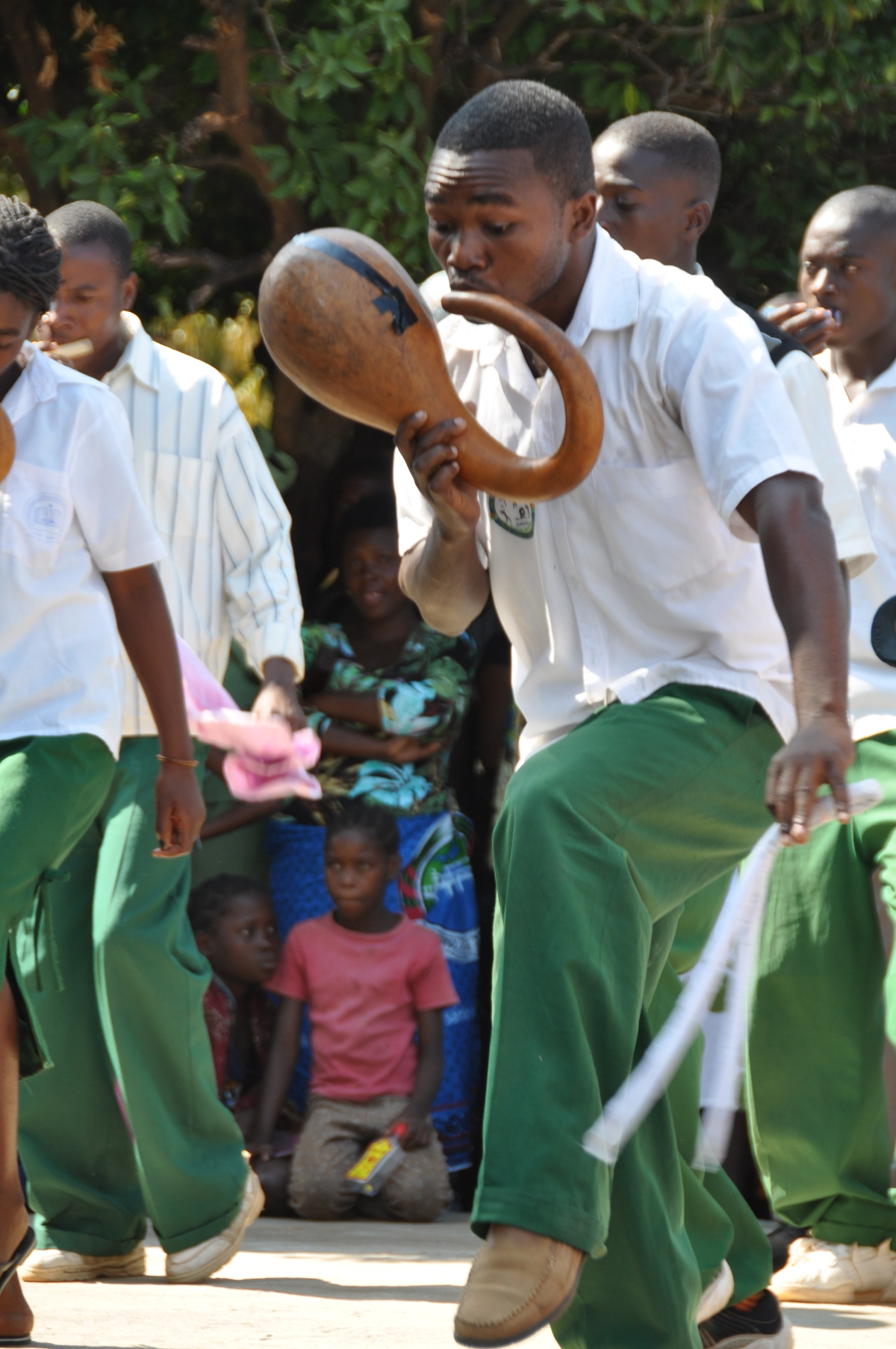
A Mozambican man playing an instrument and dancing

The music of Mozambique can serve multiple purposes, ranging from religious expression to traditional ceremonies. Musical instruments are usually handmade. Some of the instruments used in Mozambican musical expression include drums made of wood and animal skin; the lupembe, a woodwind instrument made from animal horns or wood; and the marimba, which is a kind of xylophone native to Mozambique. The marimba is a popular instrument with the Chopi of the south central coast who are famous for their musical skill and dance. Some would say that Mozambique's music is similar to reggae and West Indian calypso. Other music types are popular in Mozambique like marrabenta, and other Lusophone music forms like fado, samba, bossa nova, and maxixe (with origins from Maxixe and Kizomba).

The Makonde are renowned for their wood carving and elaborate masks that are commonly used in ritual dances. There are two different kinds of wood carvings. Shetani (evil spirits), which are mostly carved in heavy ebony, tall, and elegantly curved with symbols and nonrepresentational faces. The ujamaa are totem-type carvings which illustrate lifelike faces of people and various figures. These sculptures are usually referred to as “family trees” because they tell stories of multiple generations.

During the last years of the colonial period, Mozambican art reflected the oppression by the colonial power, and became symbol of the resistance. After independence in 1975, the modern art came into a new phase. The two best known and most influential contemporary Mozambican artists are the painter Malangatana Ngwenya and the sculptor Alberto Chissano. Also a lot of the post-independence art during the 1980s and 1990s reflect the political struggle, civil war, suffering, starvation, and struggle.

Dances are usually intricate, highly developed traditions throughout Mozambique. There are different kinds of dances from tribe to tribe which are usually ritualistic in nature. The Chopi, for instance, act out battles dressed in animal skins. The men of Makua dress in colourful outfits and masks while dancing on stilts around the village for hours. Groups of women in the northern part of the country perform a traditional dance called tufo, to celebrate Islamic holidays.

== Cuisine ==
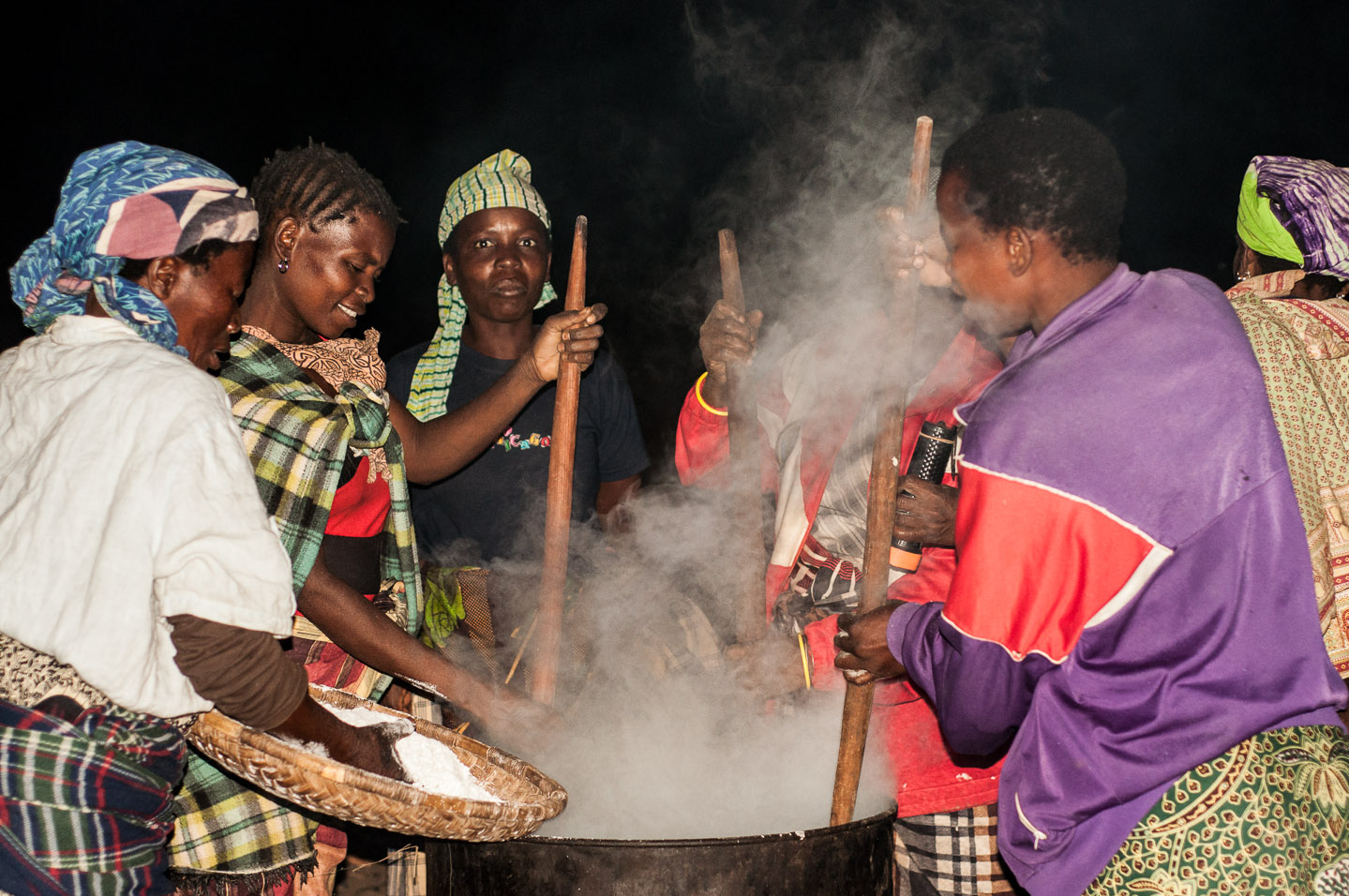
Yawo women cooking ugali for a religious festival

Mozambican cuisine is rich and varied, reflecting both its traditional roots as well as outside influences. Flavourful spicy stews eaten with rice or steamed cornmeal dough are common.

With its long coastline and rich fishing presence, fish is a key part of the national diet. The country is famous for its shellfish, such as prawns and crayfish, and its combination of seafood dishes with the spicy piri-piri sauce (which literally translates to "Spicy-Spicy").

One particular stew that is without Portuguese influence is matapa, which is usually made with cassava leaves, cashews, crab, shrimp and coconut milk. Another important dish is piri-piri chicken, which is grilled chicken basted in piri-piri sauce and served with fries.

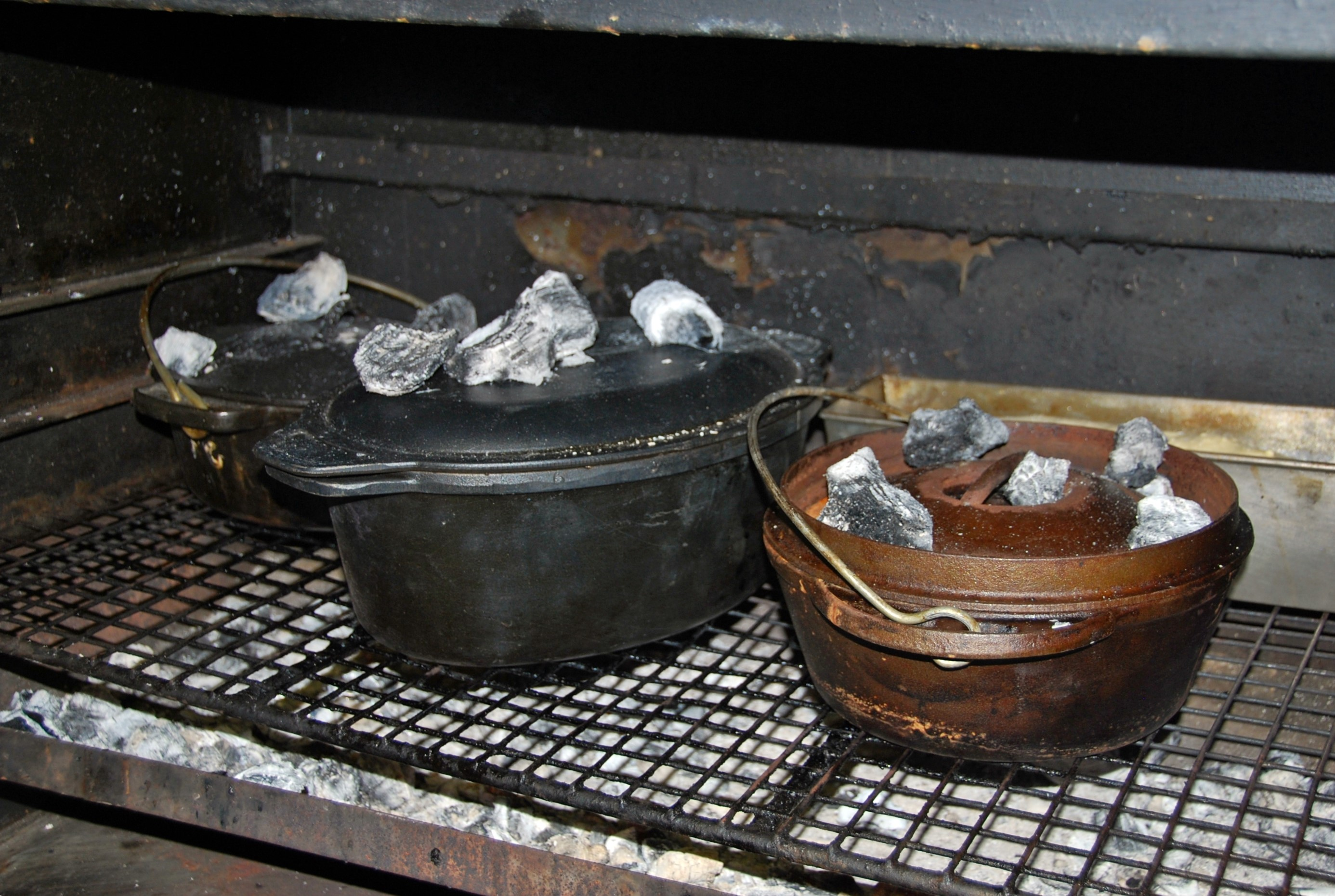
Making potbrood in Xai-Xai

Like its African neighbors, Mozambique is also blessed with a wide variety of fruits, including citrus produce (such as oranges and grapefruit), bananas, mangoes and coconuts which are enjoyed throughout the nation.

== Entertainment ==
Football (Portuguese: futebol) is the most popular sport in Mozambique. The T.V. stations watched by Mozambicans are Televisão de Moçambique, YTV, STV, TIM and RTP África; Portuguese T.V. stations RTP Internacional, SIC Internacional, SIC Notícias, MTV Portugal, Disney Channel Portugal, SuperSport 7, TSN, and Euronews; and Brazilian T.V. stations TV Globo International and TV Record are also watched on T.V. throughout Mozambique.

== Holidays ==
- Independence Day, celebrated on June 25
- New Year's Day, celebrated on January 1
- Family Day, in Mozambique, is celebrated on December 25
- Day of Mozambican Women, celebrated on April 7
- Heroes Day, celebrated on February 3
- Ramadan, celebrated for the 30 days on changing dates according to the moon calendar (celebrated among Mozambican Muslims)
- Christmas, celebrated on December 25 (celebrated among Mozambican Christians)

== Cultural identity ==
Mozambique was ruled by Portugal and they share in common; main language and second main religion (Roman Catholicism). But since most of the people are Bantus, most of the culture is native and for Bantus living in urban areas with some Portuguese influence. Mozambican culture influences the Portuguese culture. The music, movies (by RTP África), food, and traditions are now part of everyday lifestyles of Portugal.

== Spirit possession ==
A new phenomenon of spirit possession appeared after the Mozambican Civil War. These spirits, called gamba, are identified as dead soldiers, and overwhelmingly possess women. Prior to the war, spirit possession was limited to certain families and was less common.
