= Albasini =

Albasini is an Italian surname. Notable people with the surname include:

- João Albasini (1813–1888), South African trader
- João dos Santos Albasini (1876–1922), Mozambican journalist, writer, and political activist
- Michael Albasini (born 1980), Swiss cyclist

== See also ==
- Albasini Dam, a dam in Limpopo Province, South Africa
