= Bertina Lopes =

Mozambican painter and sculptor (1924–2012)

- Born: 11 July 1924; Lourenço Marques (later Maputo), Mozambique
- Died: 10 February 2012 (aged 87); Rome, Italy
- Known for: visual art
- Movement: Abstract Expressionism

Bertina Lopes (July 11, 1924 – February 10, 2012) was a Mozambican-born, Italian painter and sculptor. Lopes' work displays a deep African sensibility with saturated colours and bold compositions of mask-like figures and geometric forms. She has been acknowledged for highlighting 'the social criticism and nationalistic fervour that influenced other Mozambican artists of her time'.

== Personal life ==
Lopes was born in Lourenço Marques, the capital of Mozambique (later renamed as Maputo), on July 11, 1924, to an African mother, whose family was locally known, and a Portuguese father, who was a fieldworker. She was educated in Lourenço Marques, but after her second year of senior high school, she relocated to Lisbon to complete secondary school, where she studied painting and drawing with Lino António and Celestino Alves and earned a degree in painting and sculpture. Around that time she met artists such as Marcelino Vespeira, Carlos Botelho, Albertina Mantua, Costa Pinheiro, Júlio Pomar and Nuno Sampayo. In 1953 Lopes returned to Mozambique, where she married poet Virgilio de Lemos, with whom she had twin sons. Lopes taught Artistic Drawing at General Machado Girls’ Technical School for nine years. Although she was appreciated for her innovative teaching skills, these would occasionally enter in conflict with the school ruling system. In 1955 de Lemos published an anti-colonial poem that resulted in a trial for desecration of the Portuguese flag. He subsequently joined the Mozambican Resistance (1954–61) and was arrested for subversion. The events reinforced Lopes' sympathy for the weak and oppressed fringes of the population – a subject that would often recur in her art. During this period of her life, cultural nationalism became a large influence for both her artwork and personal ideology.

In 1956, Lopes painted a mural called "Pavilhão da Evocação Histórica" which was inaugurated on the occasion of an official visit to Mozambique of Francisco Higino Craveiro Lopes, President of the Portuguese Republic at the time when António de Oliveira Salazar was Presidente do Conselho (the official designation of the Portuguese Prime Minister). Three years later, Bertina Lopes was nominated president of the “Núcleo de Arte” of Maputo and Vice President of “Direcção” of “Núcleo de Arte”. Due to her association with Virgílio de Lemos, and with the outbreak of the Mozambican War of Independence in sight, Lopes was forced to leave Mozambique in 1961. After a short period of time in Lisbon, she moved to Rome. In 1964 she married Francesco Confaloni, a computer engineer and art lover. During those times she befriended some of the protagonists of the Italian art scene, including Marino Marini, Renato Guttuso, Carlo Levi and Antonio Scordia. In 1965, Lopes obtained Italian citizenship.

== Death ==
She died in Rome in 2012 at the age of 86. Mozambican President Armando Guebuza described Lopes as 'a humble, creative, combative and generous woman, who always demanded of herself that she surpass her previous achievements'.

== Work ==
Lopes' work was influenced by multiple sources, including Mozambican art and Portuguese modernism. Between 1946 and 1956, she embraced the art of Western painters and South American graffiti artists. Following Picasso's death in 1973, Lopes paid tribute to him with an intense painting that symbolized political repression in Spain. Once Lopes grew closer to antifascist circles, she started opposing the idea of "arte negra (black art) and found inspiration in the poetry of José Craveirinha and Noémia de Sousa, incorporating social themes into her work.

Lopes’ work was also deeply influenced by the political events that affected her home country, in particular during the period that followed the independence and the civil war between FRELIMO and RENAMO. Much of Lopes' work featured African fairy tales and stories that relate to the political events occurring at the time of production.

In 2022 the Richard Saltoun Gallery in Rome held a retrospective of Lopes' work.

In 2023 her work was included in the exhibition Action, Gesture, Paint: Women Artists and Global Abstraction 1940-1970 at the Whitechapel Gallery in London.

Her work Sto Sognando? La Città è questa? is in the collection of the National Museum of African Art, in Washington, D.C.

== Bibliography ==
- Nello Ponente, Bertina Lopes, Skema Centro d'Arte e Cultura, Rome, 1978
- Enrico Crispolti, Lungo viaggio di Bertina Lopes, Palazzo Venezia, Rome, 1986
- Pino Nazio, Bertina Lopes: Il cerchio della vita, Museo Campano, Capua, 2007
- Claudio Crescentini, Bertina Lopes: Tutto (o quasi), Palombi Editori, Rome, 2013
- Claudio Crescentini, Bertina Lopes: Arte e Antagonismo, Erreciemme Edizioni, Rome, 2017
- L'ultima Roma di Bertina Lopes. La casa-studio dell'artista raccontata per immagini , introduzione di Domenico Nardone, Roma, Queen Kristianka Edizioni, 2024 ISBN 979-12-81379-09-1
- Lucia Carrera, Bertina Lopes: il riferimento all’arte tradizionale mozambicana nelle opere tra gli anni Cinquanta e Settanta, in ′Critica d'Arte′, n. 21-22, Le Lettere, Firenze, 2024.
