= Alberto Chissano =

Mozambican sculptor (1935–1994)

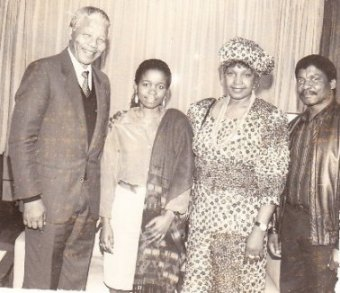
- Alberto Chissano (right) with Nelson Mandela, Winnie Mandela and his daughter Cidália Chissano (no. two from left) in Museu Galeria Chissano, July 1990. Photo: Museu Galeria Chissano
- Born: 25 January 1935; Chicavane, Manjacaze, province of Gaza, Portuguese Mozambique
- Died: 19 February 1995 (aged 60); Matola, Mozambique
- Known for: Sculpture

Alberto Mabungulane Chissano (25 January 1935 – 19 February 1994) was a Mozambican sculptor best known for his work using indigenous woods, and sculptures in rock, stone and iron. He is considered to be one of Mozambique's most important and influential artists, together with the painter Malangatana Ngwenya.

== Life and art ==
Alberto Chissano was born in Manjacaze, Gaza, in the south of Portuguese Mozambique. Like other boys in the countryside, Chissano spent his early life looking after goats. He had limited schooling; his studies were hindered by his expulsion from his mission school for dancing the traditional dance Ngalanga. He was strongly influenced by his maternal grandmother, who taught him rites and traditions such as how to divine through the use of ossicles and snail shells, as well as traditional herbal medicine.

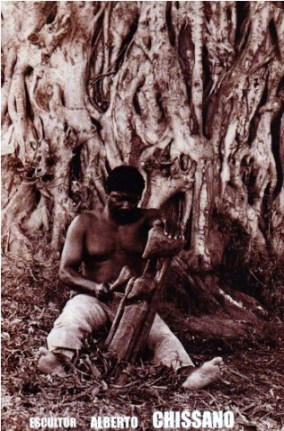
Alberto Chissano and the baobab. Photo: Museu Galeria Chissano

At the age of 12, he felt that Manjacaze was too limited an area for his aspirations, so he left for the capital, Lourenço Marques. In the capital, he found being a domestic worker unsatisfactory. He left to work in the gold mines of South Africa at the age of 18.

When he returned to Mozambique in 1956, he had to do his mandatory military service in the colonial Portuguese armed forces. He obtained a position as a servant at the art centre Associação Núcleo de Arte in the capital, and later trained in taxidermy at Museu Álvaro de Castro (now Museum of Natural History). There he was introduced to sculpting by the taxidermist Augusto Cabral. Later he returned to Núcleo de Arte, where he was inspired by the artistic environment and supported by more experienced artists. He began sculpting in his late twenties and had his first exhibition in Lourenço Marques in 1964. In subsequent years, his sculptures appeared in several exhibitions in the United States, Europe, and Africa.

Chissano was a pioneer for a generation of sculptors in the 1970s, a decade that spanned the last years of the colonial period and the beginning of Mozambican independence. He became the most famous and influential sculptor in Mozambique. His sculptures tell a lot about the history of Mozambique, the people, struggle, starvation, and suffering, but also joy and pride.

Chissano turned his family home in Matola into a museum and gallery, Museu Galeria Chissano. The museum exhibits many of Alberto Chissano's own sculptures as well as many paintings by Malangatana and other artists. In addition to being a museum, it is a centre for exhibitions, concerts, and other cultural events.

In 1982, he was awarded the Nachingwea Medal, a medal presented by the government of Mozambique in recognition of '’extraordinary merit'’. (The medal is named after FRELIMO's main camp in Tanzania during the Mozambican War of Independence).

Alberto Chissano died at 59, on 19 February 1994, in Matola.

=== Selected exhibitions ===
- 1964 First solo exhibition, Maputo
- 1966 Town Hall, Lorenço Marques, 1st Prize
- 1967 International exhibition in Washington, 2nd Prize in the African art category
- 1968 Group exhibition, London
- 1971 Munich, Germany
- 1971 Town hall of the Machopes, Chibuto, Gaza, Mozambique
- 1972 Sociedade Nacional de Belas Artes (National Society of Fine Arts), Lisbon
- 1975 Several group exhibitions in Mozambique and Nigeria
- 1980 Inauguration of Museu Nacional de Arte (the National Art Museum), Maputo
- 1981 International Symposium of Sculptures, Belgrade, Yugoslavia, 1st and 2nd prizes
- 1981 Group exhibitions in Berlin (Germany), Sofia (Bulgaria), Moscow (Soviet Union), Luanda (Angola)
- 1981 Exhibition of marble sculpture at Ar.Co – Centro de Arte e Comunicação Visual (Center for Art and Visual Communication), Lisbon
- 1983 Group exhibitions in Portugal (Lisbon and Porto) and Zimbabwe (Harare)
- 1984 Malangatana & Chissano Indian Council for Cultural Relations, New Delhi, India
- 1985 Palazzo Barberini, Rome and the Teatro Municipal, Reggio Emilia, Italy
- 1986 Havana Biennial, Cuba, 1st Prize
- 1987 Solidarity week with Mozambique, Zimbabwe
- 1987 Malangatana & Chissano, Ankara, Turkey
- 1991 Le Temps Et Le Sang (The Time and the Blood), Réunion
- 1992 Represents, among others, Mozambique in EXPO'92 in Seville, Spain
- 1999 Two artists. Two generations, with Titos Mabota, Astrup Fearnley Museum of Modern Art, Oslo, Norway
- 2000 Two artists. Two generations, with Titos Mabota, Bergen Museum, Bergen, Norway
- 2006 The Africa Centre, London

== Art galleries featuring Chissano's work ==
- Museu Galeria Chissano, Rua Escultor Chissano, 307, Bairro Sial, Matola, Maputo Province
- Museu Nacional de Arte (National Art Museum), Maputo
- African Contemporary | Art Gallery

== See also ==
- Culture of Mozambique

== Sources ==
- "Chissano Escultura", Cooperativa de Actividades Artísticas CRL, Porto, Portugal. 1990
- "Chissano & Titos. Two Artists. Two Generations" (in Norwegian and English), Astrup Fearnley Museum of Modern Art, Oslo, Norway. 1999
- "Chissano, o escultor da luminosidade cromática", Museu Galeria Chissano. 2010
