= Lília Momplé =

Mozambican writer (born 1935)

- Born: Lília Maria Clara Carrière Momplé; 19 March 1935 (age 91)
- Writing career
- Period: Post-modernism
- Genres: Novel, Short stories
- Notable work: Ninguém Matou Suhura
- Notable awards: Prémio José Craveirinha de Literatura (2011) Prêmio Caine para Escritores de África com o conto “O baile de Celina” (2001). Prémio da Novelística (João Dias) no Concurso Literário do Centenário de Maputo com o conto "Caniço"; Prémio José Craveirinha de Literatura (2011)

Lília Maria Clara Carrièrre Momplé (born on the Island of Mozambique, 19 March 1935) is a Mozambican writer.

== Biography ==
Lília Momplé was born on the Island of Mozambique, into a family of mixed ethnic origins, including Makua, French, Indian, Chinese, and Mauritian. She attended the Instituto Superior de Serviço Social (Higher Institute of Social Service) in Lisbon and graduated with a degree in Social Services. In 1995, she became secretary general of the Association of Mozambican Authors, a position she held until 2001. She also represented Mozambique at various international meetings as a member of the UNESCO Executive Board (2001-2005). In 1998, Momplé appeared as Dona Esmeralda in the film Comédia Infantil, directed by Solveig Nordlund and based on the Swedish novel Comédia Infantil (1995) by Henning Mankell. Later, the novel was translated in English by Tiina Nunnally: Chronicler of the Winds, (2006). The story happens in Mozambique and is about a young boy, Nélio, who loses his entire family during the war.

== Literary career ==
Many of Momplé's literary influences came from her grandmother, who, although she could not read or write, would always tell stories. These stories inspired young Lília because their heroes were often fragile creatures, rather than more typically powerful ones. Portuguese writers, such as Eça de Queirós and Fernando Pessoa, also influenced Momplé's career path. However, it was not until she read the writings of the Mozambican poet José Craveirinha that she made the decision to become a writer. Craveirinha was the first Mozambican author to portray African characters as protagonists in his poetry. Since Momplé was a teacher for many years, many of her stories focus on topics related to education. In her works, Lília Momplé also explores the traditional duties of women and expectations attending them within society, along with the hardships they face. She tends to emphasize issues of race, class, gender, and color and ethnic differences in her fiction.

== Awards ==
- Prémio da Novelística (João Dias) no Concurso Literário do Centenário de Maputo com o conto Caniço.
- Prémio José Craveirinha de Literatura (2011)
- Prêmio Caine para Escritores de África com o conto “O baile de Celina” (2001).

== Literary works ==
- Ninguém Matou Suhura (No One Killed Suhura), 1988
- Neighbours, 1995
- Os Olhos da Cobra Verde (The Eyes of the Green Snake), 1997
