= Rui Knopfli =

Mozambican writer

Rui Manuel Correia Knopfli (10 August 1932 in Inhambane, Portuguese East Africa – 25 December 1997 in Lisbon) was a Mozambican writer.

== Career ==
Rui Knopfli was born in Inhambane, Mozambique, in 1932. He attended secondary school in Lourenço Marques, continuing to study in Johannesburg, South Africa between 1958 and 1974.

He began his starting his professional career in Lourenço Marques (nowadays Maputo). He interacted with the most important intellectual personalities of his time and was Ambassador of Portugal in London. Intimacy, melancholy and aesthetic conscientiousness are the main themes of his works. His first book, The Country of the Other, was published in 1959. He was director of the newspaper La Tribuna between May 1974 and February 1975. Knopfli co-directed with Eugénio Lisboa, literary supplements of this newspaper and The Voice of Mozambique. He launched, with João Pedro Dias Grabato, the poetry journal, Caliban (1971–72), which brought together writers such as Jorge de Sena, Herberto Helder, António Ramos Rosa, Fernando Assis Pacheco, José Craveirinha, Sebastião Alba, etc. He directed the journal Arts & Letters (1972–75), publishing numerous translations of poets.

Knopfli left Mozambique in March 1975, returning only once in October 1989. He was part of a generation of Mozambican expatriates that included Alberto de Lacerda, Helder Macedo, poet Virgílio de Lemos, the director Ruy Guerra, philosophers Fernando Gil (philosopher) and José Gil (philosopher), the architect Pancho Guedes Miranda, the photographer Pepe Diniz, the painter Bertina Lopes and essayist Eugenio Lisboa. He settled in London in 1975. Then he held for twenty-two consecutive years, the press office of director (1975–97) at the Embassy of Portugal. In 1984 he received the award for poetry PEN Club.

He died in Lisbon in 1997.

== Works ==
- O País dos Outros, 1959
- Reino Submarino, 1962
- Máquina de Areia, 1964
- Mangas Verdes com Sal, 1969
- A Ilha de Próspero, 1972
- O Escriba Acocorado, 1978
- Memória Consentida: 20 Anos de Poesia 1959–1979, 1982
- O Corpo de Atena, 1984
- O monhé das cobras, 1997
- Obra Poética, 2003
