= Nachingwea Medal =

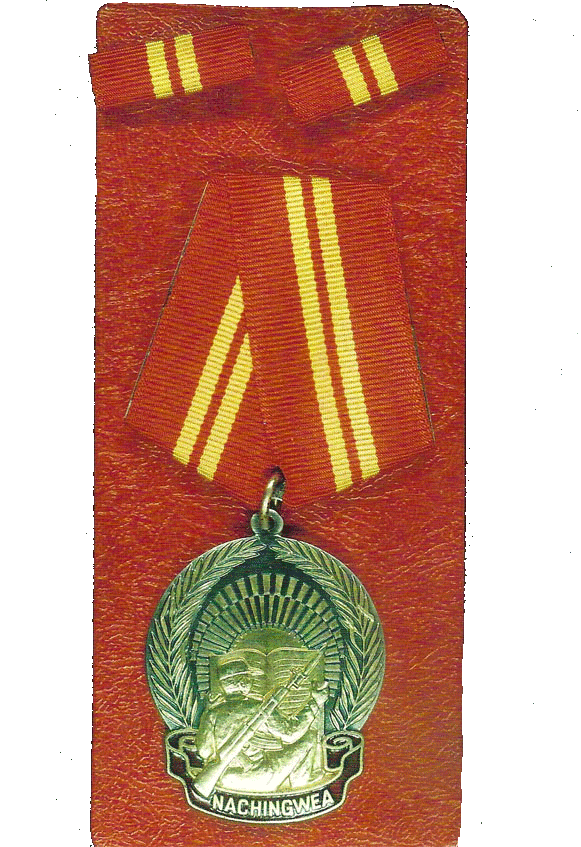
- Awarded for: Extraordinary Merit in defence of human rights, the struggle against poverty, and the fight against natural disasters.
- Presented by: Mozambique

The Nachingwea Medal is a medal awarded by the government of Mozambique in recognition of extraordinary merit. It is named after the southern Tanzania town of Nachingwea, which was the main base of Frelimo during the Mozambican War of Independence.

== Notable recipients ==
- Alberto Chissano (1982)
- José Craveirinha (1985)
- Malangatana Ngwenya (1984)
