= Orlando Mendes =

Mozambican biologist and writer (1916–1990)

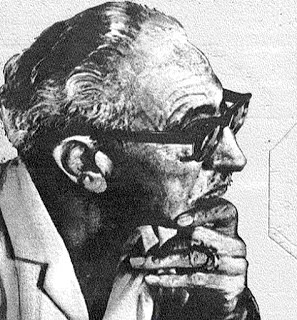
- Orlando Mendes's Portrait
- Born: August 4, 1916; Island of Mozambique
- Died: January 11, 1990 (aged 73)
- Occupations: Writer; Botanist; Poet; Civil servant; Phytopathologist; Botanical collector

Orlando Marques de Almeida Mendes (Island of Mozambique, 4 August 1916 – Maputo, 11 January 1990) was a Mozambican biologist and writer.

== Biography ==
He lived the Portuguese decolonisation of Mozambique. In 1944, he moved with his wife and daughter to Coimbra, where he studied biology at the University of Coimbra.

He worked as a biologist in Lourenço Marques and wrote for several publications such as: Tempo, Itinerário, Vértice and África. In spite of being European, he strongly criticized colonial treatment towards black people and Salazar's administration. During the Portuguese Colonial War, he was with FRELIMO nationalist party.

== Works ==
- Trajectórias (1940)
- Clima (1951)
- Carta do capataz da estrada 95 (1960)
- Depois do sétimo dia (1963)
- Portanto, eu vos escrevo (1964)
- Portagem (1966)
- Véspera confiada (1968)
- Um minuto de silêncio (1970)
- Adeus de gutucumbui (1971)
- A fome das larvas (1975)
- País emerso (1975–76)
- Produção com que aprendo (1978)
- Lume florindo na forja (1981)
- Papá Operário mais Seis Histórias (1983)
- Sobre Literatura Moçambicana (1982)

== Prizes ==
- Prémio Fialho de Almeida, 1946
