= Confession of the Lioness =

2012 novel by Mia Couto

- First edition
- Author: Mia Couto
- Original title: A Confissão da Leoa
- Translator: David Brookshaw
- Language: Portuguese
- Genre: Novel
- Set in: 21st Century Mozambique
- Publisher: Farrar Straus Giroux
- Publication date: 2012
- Publication place: Mozambique
- English publication date: 2015
- Media type: Paperback
- Pages: 192
- ISBN: 978-1-250-09726-2

Confession of the Lioness (Portuguese: A confissão da leoa) is a novel written by Mozambican author Mia Couto. Originally published in 2012, it was translated from Portuguese to English in 2015 by David Brookshaw, and it was also a finalist for the Man Booker International Prize in 2015. The story is set in the 21st century and inspired by real events that Couto experienced and real people with whom he interacted during his work as an environmental field officer in Cabo Delgado, Mozambique, in 2008. His novel portrays the enigmatic crisis of Kulumani, a small village in Mozambique, where the women have become the prey of lions. Couto establishes the story through the perspective of Mariamar, the sister of the most recent victim, and Archangel Bullseye, a hunter hired by the government.

== Plot ==
Confession of the Lioness begins with the funeral of Mariamar's older sister, Silência. As she and her mother, Hanifa Assula, watch the burial, Mariamar reveals that lions have been attacking the women of their village, Kulumani, and that Silência, was their most recent victim. The next morning, Mariamar's father, Genito Mpepe, informs Hanifa that a hunter is being sent in from Mozambique's capital, Maputo, to aid their village. In Maputo, Archangel or "Archie" Bullseye discovers that he is the hunter who has been chosen to aid Kulumani. Before he departs, he visits his brother, Roland, who was placed in a mental hospital as a child. There, Archie confesses that the true motivation for his visits is to see Luzilla, Roland's wife, with whom Archie is madly in love.

Archie leaves Maputo with Gustavo Regalo, the writer chosen to record their journey. Upon arriving in the city of Pemba, the men meet the administrator of Kulumani, Florindo Makwala, and his wife, Dona Naftalinda. The four travel to Kulumani and the next day a welcome banquet is held in the Shitala, the village's traditional center. The native men are questioning the foreigners’ presence in their village, when Naftalinda interrupts. She defames the village men for violently raping her maid, Tandi, during a hunting ritual and proclaims that they are the true beasts. Meanwhile, Mariamar reveals that she had fallen in love with Archie on his previous visit to Kulumani sixteen years ago. Conflicted about his return, she flees her home. While travelling down the Lundei River, she sees a lioness and believes that it is the spirit of her sister, Silência. Shortly after, she is caught by the village's sole policeman, Maliqueto Próprio, and then her father, afraid that Mariamar will escape Kulumani with Archie, orders her to remain home during his stay. While trapped inside her home, Mariamar recalls her youth spent in the village's Christian ministry. She also ponders her loving relationship with her grandfather, the sexual abuse she suffered from her father, her love affair with Archie, and the connection she feels to the waters of the Lundei and the ocean.

Archie, Gustavo, Florindo, and Genito, one of the village's most skilled trackers, embark on a hunt. Archie sees a lioness but is unable to shoot her. He does shoot a hyena that was carrying the femur of Tandi, the lions’ latest victim. After Tandi's funeral, Luzilla visits Archie, and together the two depart for Kulumani's district capital, Palma. Naftalinda plans to sacrifice herself to the lions, and Florindo begs Mariamar, who was a childhood companion of Naftalinda's, to reason with her. Mariamar convinces Naftalinda to abandon her plan, but when the two women exit Florindo's residence, Naftalinda is attacked by a lioness. Mariamar wrestles with the animal until it retreats. This leads the surrounding crowd to believe that Mariamar herself is a lioness, and the entire village jeers for her execution. However, Naftalinda and Florindo defend Mariamar. After the incident, Mariamar returns home despondently, feeling inhuman and as though she is merely an animal trapped inside the body of a woman. She then goes to lay by the dead body of the lioness. Concurrently, Archie has returned to Kulumani with Florindo who informed him that the lions attacking the town had been killed and that Genito died while slaying the lioness. Archie has been instructed by Naftalinda to bring Mariamar to Maputo with him so that she can be treated at a mental hospital. He visits Hanifa to offer her his condolences, and he then leaves with Mariamar, for Maputo, where his love Luzilla awaits his return. Before they depart, Hanifa tells Archie that there were three lions, and she is the one lioness that remains.

== Major characters ==
=== Mariamar Mpepe ===
Mariamar is the thirty-two-year-old daughter of Hanifa Assula and Genito Mpepe. She is the only survivor of four sisters. Mariamar and her sister Silencia suffered from the sexual abuse of their father in childhood, and Mariamar was paralyzed from the waist down. She was sent to a correctional missionary, where she meets Dona Naftalinda, then known as Oceanita. She regained the ability to walk but is still believed to be infertile, and infertile women in her village are debased even lower than normal women. She claims to have been the one who called the hunters to Kulumani, much to her father's chagrin. He and her mother shut Mariamar away during the outsiders' visit to prevent her from leaving the village, but she longs to see the man who once saved her, idealizing him as her chance to run away from the absolute power of the abusive men, culture, and society of Kulumani.

=== Archangel Bullseye ===
Archangel Bullseye is the mulatto hunter who is hired by the government to kill the lions attacking Kulumani. He had visited the village sixteen year prior, and during his stay, he had saved a young Mariamar from being raped by the village police officer. After Mariamar fell in love with him, he deserted her. When Archie returns to Kulumani, he is received with suspicion by the village's inhabitants. He no longer remembers Mariamar but instead loses sleep over different memories. He is haunted by the death of his parents, one of whom was shot by his brother, Roland, when the two were merely children. Archie is ultimately ineffective in hunting the lions. His failure can be attributed to the distraction of his love for his brother's wife, Luzilia, or it can be seen as an effect of the mysterious events he witnesses, which prompt him to question whether the lions are the danger from which Kulumani needs rescued.

=== Hanifa Assula ===
Hanifa Assula is the mother of Mariamar, Silência, and two other unnamed daughters who drowned at a young age. Mariamar often describes her mother as tender but harsh. Despite the abuse of her husband, Genito, she obeys his will, takes care of his home, and calls him n’twangu, a title of respect that all women in Kulumani use to refer to their husbands. While Hanifa appears to be a living person, she describes herself and other women as dead, inhuman, or nonexistent. There are many dark elements to her character which imply that she belongs not only to this world but to the world of spirits.

=== Genito Mpepe ===
Genito Mpepe is the husband of Hanifa Assula and the Father of their four daughters. He comes from a family that was favored by the Portuguese colonists. Following in the footsteps of his father, he became a tracker. He is referred to as “comrade,” by Florindo and the village policeman, and Florindo even invites him to serve as the tracker for Archangel Bullseye's hunt. However, within his home, Genito is an abusive drunkard who raped both Silencia and Mariamar when the two were children.

=== Dona Naftalinda ===
Dona Naftalinda is the first lady of Kulumani, who is married to Florindo. Archie describes her as majestic but vastly overweight. She possesses a strong female personality, which inspires strength within Mariamar. As a child, she lived at the same missionary as Mariamar, where she was known as Oceanita.

=== Florindo Makwala ===
Florindo serves as the administrator to Kulumani, who accompanies Archie on his journey to Kulumani and on a lion hunt. He is depicted as pompous by Archie who notes how he insists that his home be termed a residence instead of a house. Throughout the majority of the novel, Florindo is disliked by many villagers and even his wife, and his main concern is the effects that the lion attacks have on his political career. However, at the end of the novel, his relationship with his wife is restored. He joins her in defending Mariamar from the imminent danger of a raucous crowd of villagers, and Naftalinda remarks that he has once again become the man that she married.

=== Gustavo Regalo ===
Gustavo Regalo is a famous writer who has been chosen to accompany Archie on his journey and record the details of the expedition. Archie describes Regalo as self-satisfied, and his accusatory nature reminds him of his brother, Roland. Yet, by the end of the story, the two develop an understanding of one another and become friends. Regalo's character can be seen as Couto's way of light-heartedly mocking himself. Both are white, glasses-wearing writers, who chronicle lion-hunts in Mozambique.

== Historical context ==
Confession of the Lioness takes place shortly after the end of the Mozambican Civil War. Although Kulumani is not an actual Mozambican location, Couto uses this imaginary village to demonstrate the devastating effects that almost three decades of war had on the country's villages.

=== Independence from Portugal ===
Mozambique fought against Portugal for approximately ten years, starting in 1964. Led by the Mozambique Liberation Front, otherwise known as FRELIMO (Frente de Libertação de Moçambique), the Mozambican forces abandoned peaceful negotiations and adopted guerrilla warfare. After a ceasefire in 1974, Mozambique gained independence in 1975 under the Head of State, Samora Machel.

=== Civil War ===
In the wake of Mozambique's independence, many Portuguese colonials fled the area, resulting in a collapse of the country's economy and class system. Mozambique then became a socialist country under its newfound leaders. With nationalism running rampant, most of the four hundred thousand white Portuguese Mozambicans were forced out of the country, and white minorities in surrounding countries also suffered. Members of FRELIMO, who disagreed with the group's stringent socialist policies and persecution of those who benefited from Portuguese colonialism, formed the Mozambican National Resistance, RENAMO (Resistência Nacional Moçambicana), with the support of Rhodesia and South Africa. The group began its attacks on FRELIMO in 1976, and their tactics were marked by massacre and mandated conscription of civilians. It was not until the late 1980s that the militant fighting ceased with a stalemate. By 1989, the resources of both sides were severely depleted, and as a result, formal peace talks began. Violence between FRELIMO and RENAMO continued, but in 1992, the two groups were able to negotiate a permanent ceasefire.

=== Kulumani ===
During the Mozambican Civil War, villages like Kulumani were consolidated and militarized, and after the fighting ceased, fragmentation and conflict between tradition and modernity remained, as they do in the fictional region that Couto creates. He illustrates how the preceding Mozambican conflicts of the post-colonial era have spawned further tension between the tribal, Christian, and Islamic belief systems that exist in the region. Although it is not explicitly stated in the novel, Florindo, the administrator to Kulumani, can be seen as a member of FRELIMO, while the tribal men who lead violent hunting rituals and are responsible for the rape of Naftalinda's maid, Tandi, can be seen as adherents of RENAMO.

== Themes ==
=== Female oppression ===
Couto denounces the patriarchy through the depictions of female oppression that pervade the novel. He develops this theme through the actions and declarations of its three major female characters, Hanifa, Naftalinda, and Mariamar. All three women are both oppressed by men and rebel against that oppression in different ways. For example, Mariamar is demeaned for being infertile and submits to the will of her abusive father. Also, as a child, she was sent to a missionary for the paralysis in her legs, a sickness that can be interpreted as a representation of the powerlessness of women. However, as the narrative develops, her strength is inspired by that of Naftalinda and Hanifa, and by the end, she has become a type of prophet for the women of Kulumani, who speaks of a world that will succumb to disaster without the presence of females. Like Mariamar, Hanifa submits to the abuse of Genito, but despite this submission, the story closes with her cry of redemption and vengeance, as she tells Archie that although it may seem that all the lions have been killed, she, the last lioness, remains living. Throughout the action of the novel, Naftalinda emanates feminine strength by decrying, in the presence of men, the subjugation and violence that the women of Kulumani face. Nevertheless, her childhood illustrates the oppression of women as she was demeaned for the large size of her body and even sent to a missionary to be healed of it. Couto further establishes the theme of female oppression through the lionesses that attack the village. These attacks can be seen as an imitation of the violence that the men of Kulumani inflict upon the women, or they can be viewed as an imitation of the suppressed rage of the women of Kulumani. Additionally, the lion attacks can be interpreted as a means of freedom for the women of Kulumani. By dying in the claws of lions, they are freed from the powerlessness and fear that pervades their lives due to the oppression of men.

=== Humanity vs. animality ===
Although the threat to Kulumani seems to at first be physical lions, as the novel develops, it appears that the actual threat to the village may be the violence of the men within it. The initial confusion of whether man or beast is tormenting the village creates a theme of Humanity vs. Animality. Couto further blurs the distinction between the two natures through the language of the novel itself, often describing the actions of the human characters in the same way that one would describe the movements of a serpent or wild cat. This theme is further established by the magical elements of the story. The lionesses have been interpreted as spiritual, physical, and metaphorical. It is speculated that the lionesses do not consume their female victims, but rather the female victims become the lionesses. Through this transformation, the anger at the victim's oppression, which they have had to hide during their lifetimes, is made manifest through the violence of the lionesses. Female oppression is the central theme of the work to which all other themes and motifs relate. As a result, the similarities between man and beast are also depicted through inhumane treatment of women. The women of Kulumani are rendered beasts by the labors of their everyday work and by the abuse of men. For example, one of the story's most prominent oppressors, Genito Mpepe, threatens to tie his wife up like an animal if she does not submit to his will. In addition, the female characters themselves acknowledge their inhumanity. This is exemplified through the scene of the novel where Archie catches a glimpse of Mariamar and asks who she is, and Hanifa Assula responds that it was no one. Archie replies that he is certain he saw woman, but Hanifa repeats her original response. The theme of humanity vs. animality not only reinforces the oppression of women, but also highlights the consequences of brutal war, as the violence of Kulumani's past war is viewed as the cause of the fading separation between human and beast. Although the lion attacks in Kulumani are most commonly related to female oppression by critics, they have also been interpreted as symbolic of the repercussions of the violence that men inflict upon each other in war.

== Critical reception ==
Although the English translation of Confession of the Lioness was a finalist for the Man Booker International Prize in 2015 and received largely positive reviews from critics, many disliked Couto's use of language. Critics from Publishers Weekly, The Quarterly Conversation, and The Financial Times write that his language is overly poetic, confusing, and often distracts from the plot. Critic Geoff Wisner from The Quarterly Conversation adds that Brookshaw should not be blamed for the cumbersome language, as he marvelously translated previous works by Couto. In contrast, other critics remark that Couto's lyrical language is one of the novel's stronger elements. Critic, Ellah Alfrey from The Guardian praises Brookshaw for his ability to maintain the “music of the original.” Some critics even comment that at times the plot is confusing and actually distracts from the novel's enchanting language. In spite of the prior criticisms, Couto is commonly acclaimed for the haunting yet captivating tale he constructs in Confession of the Lioness. The work also receives praise for its presentation of enriching themes and exploration of issues in post-colonial Africa.
