= João dos Santos Albasini =

Mozambican journalist (1876-1922)

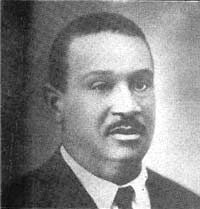
- dos Santos Albasini's photograph in O Brado Africano
- Born: November 2, 1876; Magul, Gaza Province, Mozambique
- Died: August 15, 1922 (aged 45); Maputo

João dos Santos Albasini, also named in Ronga as Nwandzengele, (November 2, 1876 – August 15, 1922) was an influential Mozambican journalist, writer, and political activist who advocated for the rights of indigenous Africans under Portuguese colonial rule in Lourenço Marques (modern-day Maputo). He was one of the founding members of the political group O Grêmio Africano ("The African Guild") and editor, director and frequent contributor to the organization's political newspapers O Africano ("The African") and O Brado Africano ("The African Roar").

== Biography ==
=== Family ===
João dos Santos Albasini was born in Magul, Mozambique, a village in the southern Gaza Province. His father was Francisco João Albasini, known in Ronga as Nwandywawa, and his paternal grandfather was a Portuguese citizen also named João Albasini, referred to as Juwawa in Ronga, who served as Portuguese Vice-Consul to the Transvaal. His Portuguese bloodline granted his family assimilado ("assimilated") status under the racialized colonial code, which allowed them more social liberties than those of indígena (indigenous African) status. João dos Santos Albasini's mother was the granddaughter of the Rongan Chief of the Maxaquene clan of Ka-Mfumo (the Ronga territory that is now present-day Maputo), and held many names such as Facaxanam, Secaxane, Kocuene Mpfumo, and Joaquina Correia d'Oliveira.

In 1897, João Albasini married Bertha Carolina Heitor (Nwana-wa-tilu in Ronga) in Lourenço Marques, and they had two children, Beatriz (Minyembeti) and Carlos Eduardo. Their marriage, however, would end in divorce in 1916, and Albasini moved his attentions to Michaela Laforte, to whom he wrote many love letters now preserved in Livro da Dor ("Book of Pain"). Laforte ultimately rejected his marriage proposal.

=== Education ===
João dos Santos Albasini attended Catholic school in Laurenço Marques at the Escola Paroquial de Lourenço Marques ("Lourenço Marques Parroquial School") under the instruction of Father Antônio Dias Simões.

== Political life ==
=== Public figure ===
In 1909, João dos Santos Albasini was appointed the Head of Native Labor Services, a position in which he remained until his death in 1922. During this period, however, he was suspended on several occasions by the Governor-General Freire de Andrade due to his criticisms of colonial rule. He only made one attempt at political office in his lifetime, when in 1920 he ran for Deputy to the Portuguese Parliament as a representative for Mozambique; he lost this race to Jaime Ribeiro, however, a Portuguese physician who had never been to Mozambique according to the Grêmio's press.

During his time as Head of Native Labor Services, Albasini went on social research expeditions to the southern Mozambican region of Sul do Save, taking notice of the poor labor conditions of the indigenous, migratory workers. His observational accounts of the labor and racial injustices he saw in the south fueled his political writings for O Grêmio Africano, where he advocated for the political power of the indigenous population. As the editor of O Brado Africano, he openly attacked the "Shibalo Laws" which required every African adult male to work 6 months of the year on settlers' plantations, regarding it as a practice of slavery. His political leadership and involvement, however, marred the legacy of his journalistic activism, as his position of Head of Native Labor Services paid him a percentage of the "Shibalo Labor" profit, a moral controversy which arose in his later political years.

In 1914, he was the first and only African to be appointed to a 6-person government commission to study traditional laws and customs in Mozambique.

==== O Grêmio Africano ("The African Guild") ====
O Grêmio Africano was a social collective and political lobby founded in 1908 in Lourenço Marques, Mozambique, by João dos Santos Albasini and his brother, José Albasini (1878-1935), and their friend Estácio Dias. It formed as an indigenous response to the colonial "Native Laws" which barred citizenship to Africans natives, and offered partial sociopolitical status to the small, mixed-race and clerical population. This small assimilado (assimilated) middle class made up only 0.04% of the total African population in Mozambique in the year 1940. Thus, at the turn of the century the group was mostly composed of Catholic Afro-Europeans and Protestant African missionaries, connecting under pan-African nativism, advocating for the promotion and education of indigenous Africans. O Grêmio Africano later affiliated itself with A Liga Africana, which was a pan-African political party based in Lisbon, expanding their breadth and political influence to a more nationalized scale. The organization attracted the attention of other pan-African activists such as Marcus Garvey and W.E.B. DuBois, aligning more so with the latter's non-racial tone rather than Garvey's racialized activism. The two organizations were pivotal in the revocation of the 1917 Assimilation Decree, which was a series of laws involving forced labor, land expropriation, and indigenous taxes.

The organization published its political opinions in two editorials: O Africano (1908–1918) and O Brado Africano (1918–1938).

=== Journalism ===
==== O Africano ("The African") ====
João dos Santos Albasini and his brother José Albasini (1878-1935) founded O Grêmio's first editorial, O Africano, in 1908, which was the country's first paper to be entirely written and produced by Africans, and as such he is often considered Mozambique's first journalist. It was also the first publication in Mozambique to bilingually include articles in both Portuguese and Ronga, a language indigenous to the Tsonga people of southern Mozambique. This allowed the publications to become popular amongst the native population in southern Mozambique, being accessible to the many African laborers along the developing infrastructure stretching from Laurenço Marques to the Transvaal in South Africa. The paper exposed and spoke against many of the cruel and unsuitable labor conditions in the Transvaal for migratory workers.

O Africano strongly condemned the Portuguese laws of exception which drew distinctions in citizenship between brancos ("white settlers"), indígenas ("natives"), and assimilados ("assimilated Africans"). The paper was a leading voice in early nationalism against colonial rule, condemning the racial hierarchy and infrastructural failures of the colonial state.

João dos Santos Albasini left his post as editor in 1909, passing the responsibility to his friend José dos Santos Rufino who remained editor until 1918 when the Albasini brothers sold O Africano to begin O Brado Africano.

==== O Brado Africano ("The African Roar") ====
The secondary phase of O Grêmio Africano's editorial newspaper was O Brado Africano, lasting from 1918 until 1938.
The O Brado Africano was a weekly editorial like O Africano, but with notably more maturity and encompassing a wider scope of issues. While continuing to further the advocacy for indigenous citizenship rights amid the colonial "Native Laws", O Brado Africano also championed labor rights of native workers, lobbying against Portuguese agricultural plantation interests and publicly labelling the "Shibalo" labor system as a form of slavery. The paper was also an outspoken advocate for women and children, lobbying tirelessly over Portuguese Colonial wine, which was seen by Albasini as a metaphor for colonialism, and he also linked it to alcohol abuse and domestic violence. The paper also promoted pan-Africanism through the publications and writings of Marcus Garvey.

O Brado Africano holds a special significance in the literary legacy of Mozambique. In 1932, it published the first works of Rui de Noronha who would be later known as the father of Mozambican literature. A decade later, the paper would introduce the first published poems of José Craveirinha, who is recognized by many as the greatest Mozambican poet in history. Its support of indígenous art and political pieces introduced many Mozambican artists to a transnational and transhistorical lens.

==== O Combate ("The Fight") ====
In 1919, shortly before travelling to Lisbon to treat his medical needs, Albasini wrote a series of articles for O Combate, the paper of the Portuguese Socialist Party.

== Death and legacy ==
João dos Santos Albasini died of tuberculosis in Laurenço Marques on August 15, 1922. Reportedly, his funeral was attended by an estimated 5,000 people, among whom were both Portuguese colonial officials and the Queen Sibebe of the Maxaquene clan, Albasini's maternal cousin.

For his efforts in opposition to the Portuguese labor laws, a masonry compound in Sul do Save now holds the name Nwandzengele, Albansini's Ronga name to honor his efforts and advocacy of native workers.

A year after his death, the Escola João Albasini, a vocational school for African women, opened its doors with classes in literacy, sewing, and cooking.

In 1925, a collection of Albasini's personal letters to Michaela Loforte, a lover who would later refuse his marriage proposal, were compiled by his nephew Luís Albasini and published posthumously by Nicanor da Silva under the title O Livro da Dor ("The Book of Pain"). Its literary value is disputed, however it is accepted as one of the earliest Mozambican works, paving the way for future Mozambican writers such as Rui de Noronha and João Dias.
