= Casa dos Estudantes do Império =

Students' house in Lisbon

The Casa dos Estudantes do Império (Portuguese for House of Students of the Empire) was a common home where Portuguese, Angolan, Cape Verdean and Mozambican students—and possibly Goan too—who stood up for the interests of the Portuguese colonies.

== Background ==
The Casa dos Estudantes do Império was paid for by the Portuguese government, as a form of supporting students of the Portuguese colonies who were in Lisbon for their higher studies. Although many Brazilians visited the house, it was primarily a meeting place for African students.

The house is offered in addition to a cafeteria, medical care as well as a cultural and sports program. The union came about around 1944/45 and resulted from the merger of the Casa dos Estudantes de Angola (est. 1943), the Casa dos Estudantes de Moçambique (founded 1944) and the Casa dos Estudantes de Cabo Verde (est. 1944).

Although the facility has been maintained by the Portuguese government, the Casa dos Estudantes do Império turned out to eventually be the cradle of the nationalist movement in the colonies.

Since 1948, the monthly magazine 'Mensagem' was issued, in which numerous writers from the colonies published their works. With the beginning of the war of independence in 1964, the publication was discontinued. In addition, students such as Orlando de Albuquerque and Vítor Evaristo authored numerous books.
