= Sleepwalking Land =

1992 novel by Mia Couto

- First edition
- Author: Mia Couto
- Original title: Terra Sonâmbula
- Translator: David Brookshaw
- Language: Portuguese (original); English (translation)
- Genre: Historical Fiction, Magic Realism
- Publisher: Editorial Caminho, Serpent's Tail
- Publication date: 1992
- Publication place: Mozambique
- English publication date: 2006
- Pages: 224
- ISBN: 978-1-85242-897-6

Sleepwalking Land (in Portuguese: Terra Sonâmbula) is a novel written by Mia Couto, a Mozambican writer, first published in Portuguese in 1992 and translated into English by David Brookshaw in 2006. In 1995, the novel received the National Fiction Award from the Association of Mozambican Writers (AEMO) and was chosen as one of the twelve best African books of the 20th century by the panel of the Zimbabwe International Book Fair. The book was also the representative text read by the Neustadt Prize jury when Couto was nominated for the 2014 Neustadt International Prize for Literature, which he won.

== Plot ==
Set in a war-torn Mozambique during the end of the civil war when the tension between rival political parties was at its highest point, Tuahir, an older man, and Muidinga, a boy recovering from illness, met at the refugee camp and fled. Together, they travel down a road that had been abandoned and encounter many signs of the war including a burnt bus and many corpses along the side of the road. Next to one of these bodies they find a set of notebooks written by a person named Kindzu. Muidinga and Tuahir take the notebooks with them into the scorched remnants of the bus that they use as a shelter. The narration alternates the conversations between Tuahir and Muidinga with the entries of the notebooks being read aloud by the latter. Kindzu manages to narrate the birth of an independent Mozambique and the struggle to keep stability right before the civil war. He also discusses the importance of family relationships and finding an identity, both personal and national.
