= Mia Couto =

Mozambican writer (born 1955)

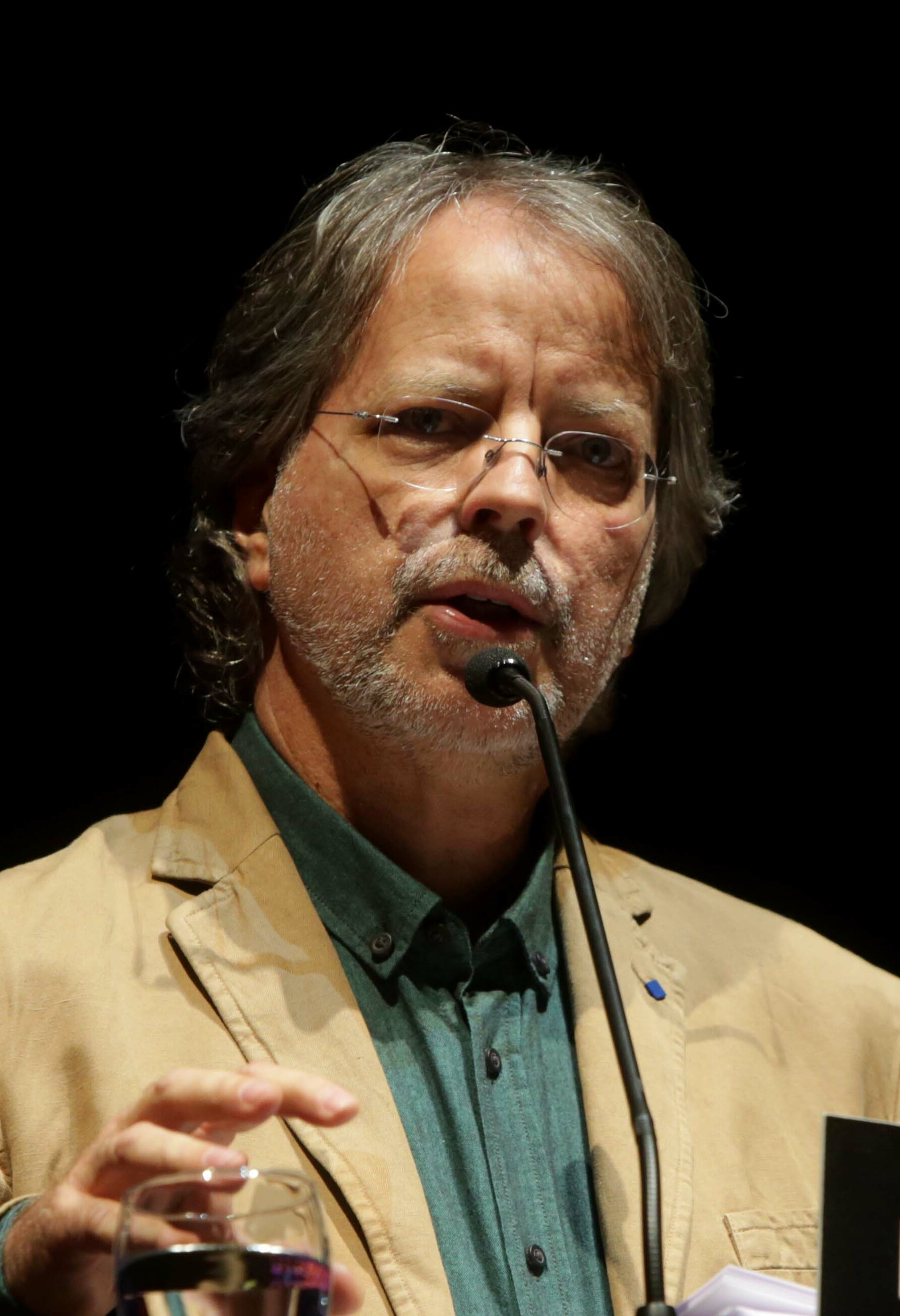
- Couto at Fronteiras do Pensamento (2014)
- Born: António Emílio Leite Couto; 5 July 1955 (age 71); Beira, Mozambique
- Occupations: Biologist and writer
- Writing career
- Period: Colonial & Post-colonial Africa
- Genres: Animist realism, historical fiction

António Emílio Leite Couto, better known as Mia Couto (born 5 July 1955), is a Mozambican writer. He won the Camões Prize in 2013, the most important literary award in the Portuguese language, and the Neustadt International Prize for Literature in 2014.

== Life ==
=== Early years ===
Mia Couto was born on 5 July 1955 in Beira, Mozambique, the country's third largest city, where he was also raised and schooled. He is the son of Portuguese emigrants who moved to the Portuguese colony in the 1950s. When he was 14 years old, some of his poetry was published in a local newspaper, Notícias da Beira. Three years later, in 1971, he moved to the capital Lourenço Marques (now Maputo) and began to study medicine at the University of Lourenço Marques. During this time, the anti-colonial guerrilla and political movement FRELIMO was struggling to overthrow the Portuguese colonial rule in Mozambique.

=== After independence of Mozambique ===
In April 1974, after the Carnation Revolution in Lisbon and the overthrow of the Estado Novo regime, Mozambique was about to become an independent republic. In 1974, FRELIMO asked Couto to suspend his studies for a year to work as a journalist for Tribuna until September 1975 and then as the director of the newly created Mozambique Information Agency (AIM). Later, he ran Tempo magazine until 1981. His first book of poems, Raiz de Orvalho, was published in 1983; it included texts aimed against the dominance of Marxist militant propaganda. Couto continued working for the newspaper Notícias until 1985 when he resigned to finish his course of study in biology.

== Literary works and recognition ==
Couto is considered one of the most important writers in Mozambique; his works have been published in more than 20 countries and in various languages. In many of his texts, he undertakes to recreate the Portuguese language by infusing it with regional vocabulary and structures from Mozambique, thus producing a new model for the African narrative. Stylistically, his writing is influenced by magical realism, a movement popular in modern Latin American literatures, and his use of language is reminiscent of the Brazilian writer João Guimarães Rosa, but also deeply influenced by the baiano writer Jorge Amado. He has been noted for creating proverbs, sometimes known as "improverbs", in his fiction, as well as riddles, legends, and metaphors, giving his work a poetic dimension.

An international jury at the Zimbabwe International Book Fair named his first novel, Sleepwalking Land, one of the best 12 African books of the 20th century. In 2007, he became the first African author to win the prestigious Latin Union literary prize, which has been awarded annually in Italy since 1990. Mia Couto became only the fourth writer in the Portuguese language to take home this prestigious award. Currently, he is a biologist employed by the Great Limpopo Transfrontier Park while continuing his work on other writing projects.

In 1998, Couto was elected to the Brazilian Academy of Letters, the first African writer to receive such an honour.

== Awards and honours ==
- 2007: Latin Union Prize
- 2013: Camões Prize
- 2014: Neustadt International Prize for Literature
- 2020: Jan Michalski Prize for Literature
- 2024: FIL de Literatura en Lenguas Romances
- 2025: PEN/Nabokov Award for International Literature

== In popular culture ==
In 2025, the Portuguese singer Ana Mariano released the song entitled Afinar (Outros) Silêncios (or Tuning Other Silences), inspired by the literary character Mwuanito, from Mia Couto's 2009 novel Jesusalém. The song appeared on Mariano's EP record Outras Vias de Aproximação (or Other Approach Routes).

== Works ==
- Raiz do Orvalho (poetry, 1983)
- Vozes Anoitecidas (short stories, 1986). [Voices Made Night. Translated by David Brookshaw (1990), ISBN 0-435-90570-8]
- Cada Homem É uma Raça (short stories, 1990), ISBN 972-21-0071-8
- Cronicando (crônicas, 1991), ISBN 972-21-0585-X
- Terra Sonâmbula (novel, 1992), ISBN 972-21-0790-9 [Sleepwalking Land. Translated by David Brookshaw (2006), ISBN 1-85242-897-X]
- Estórias Abensonhadas (short stories, 1994). Rain and Other Stories, trans. Eric M.B. Becker (2019)
- A Varanda do Frangipani (novel, 1996), ISBN 972-21-1050-0 [Under the Frangipani. Translated by David Brookshaw. (2001), ISBN 0-86486-378-0]
- Contos do Nascer da Terra (short stories, 1997)
- Mar Me Quer (novella, 1998)
- Vinte e Zinco (novella, 1999), ISBN 972-21-1250-3
- Raiz de orvalho e outros poemas (1999), ISBN 972-21-1302-X
- O Último Voo do Flamingo (novel, 2000), ISBN 972-21-1334-8 [The Last Flight of the Flamingo. Translated by David Brookshaw. (2004), ISBN 1852428139]
- Mar me quer (2000)
- O Gato e o Escuro (children's book, 2001)
- Na Berma de Nenhuma Estrada e Outros Contos (short stories, 2001)
- Um Rio Chamado Tempo, uma Casa Chamada Terra (novel, 2002) [A River Called Time]
- Contos do Nascer da Terra (short stories, 2002)
- O País do Queixa Andar (crônicas, 2003)
- O Fio das Missangas (short stories, 2003)
- A chuva pasmada (2004), ISBN 972-21-1654-1
- Pensatempos: textos de opinião (2005). Pensativities: Selected Essays. Translated by David Brookshaw (2015), ISBN 978-1771960076
- O Outro Pé da Sereia (novel, 2006), ISBN 972-21-1795-5
- Venenos de Deus, Remédios do Diabo (novel, 2008), ISBN 978-972-21-1987-0
- Jesusalém (novel, 2009), ISBN 978-972-21-2797-4
- A Confissão da Leoa (novel, 2012) [Confession of the Lioness. Translated by David Brookshaw (2015), ISBN 9780374129231]
- As Areias do Imperador (Sands of the Emperor) trilogy:
  - Mulheres de cinzas (2015). Woman of the Ashes, trans. David Brookshaw (Farrar, Straus and Giroux, 2018). ISBN 9780374292270
  - A Espada e a Azagaia (2016). The Sword and the Spear, trans. David Brookshaw (Farrar, Straus and Giroux, 2020)
  - O Bebedor de Horizontes (2018). The Drinker of Horizons, trans. David Brookshaw (Farrar, Straus and Giroux, 2023)

=== Compilations in English ===
- Every Man Is a Race [Translation of selected works from: Cada homem é uma raça, and Cronicando; translated by David Brookshaw] (1994) ISBN 0-435-90982-7
- Sea Loves Me: Selected Stories (2021). Trans. David Brookshaw with Eric M.B. Becker

== Relevant literature ==
- Cunha, Maria Salete. "Entre capulanas e silêncios: as mulheres em A confissão da leoa e Jesusalém de Mia Couto." (2018).
- de Araújo Teixeira, Eduardo. "O provérbio nas estórias de Guimarães Rosa e Mia Couto." Navegações 8, no. 1 (2015): 57–63.
- Hamilton, Grant and David Paul Huddart. 2016. A Companion to Mia Couto. Boydell & Brewer.
- Hooper, Myrtle J., and Isabel B. Rawlins. "Mia Couto and the enchantment of rain." Literator (Potchefstroom. Online) 46, no. 1 (2025): 1-8.
- Van Haesendonck, Kristian. "Mia Couto’s Postcolonial Epistemology: Animality in Confession of the Lioness (A Confissão da leoa)." ZOOPHILOLOGICA. Polish Journal of Animal Studies 5 (2019): 297–308.
