= Tufo (dance) =

Traditional dance from Mozambique

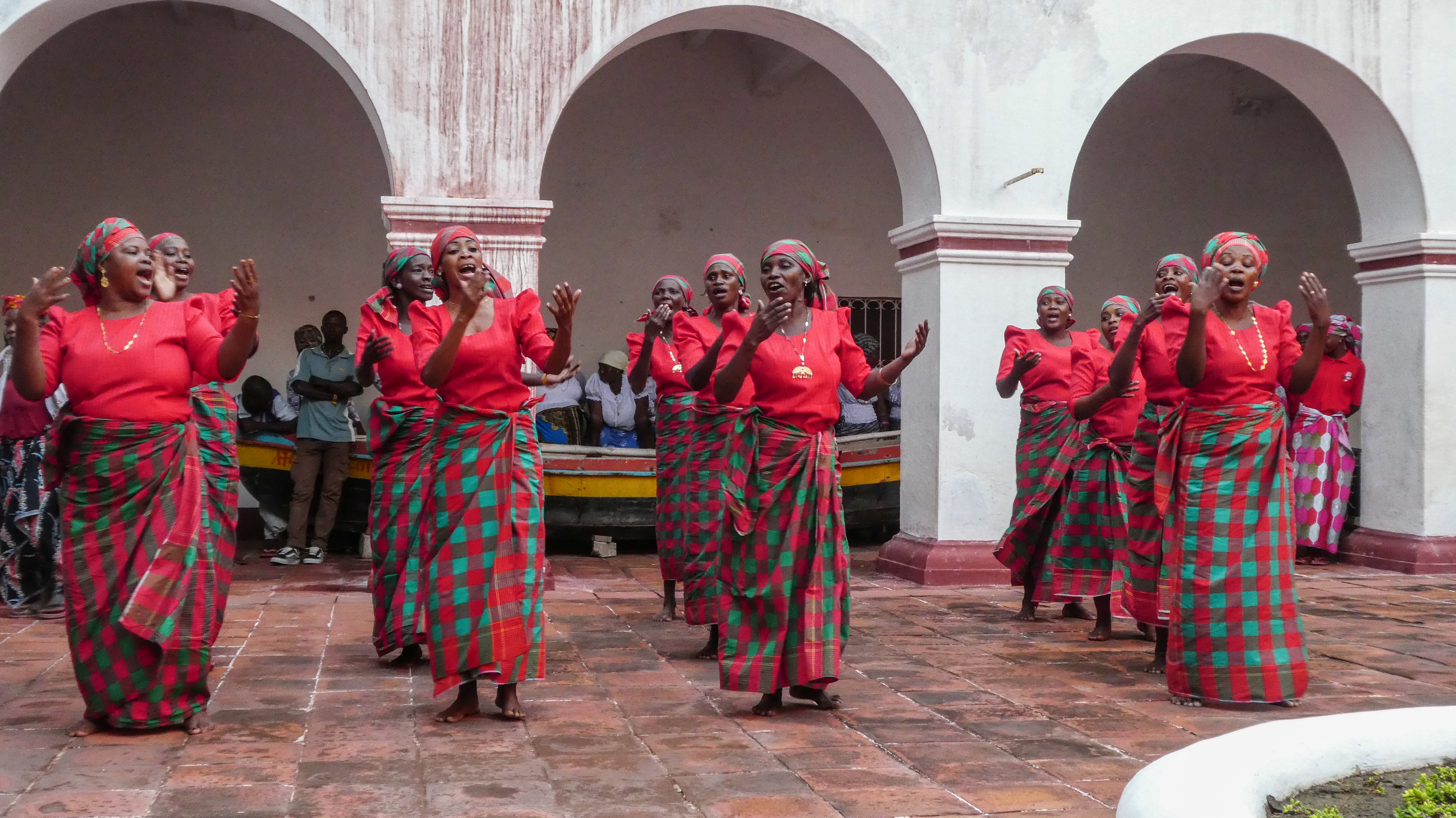
Women dancing tufo

Tufo is a traditional dance in Northern Mozambique. The dance is performed by groups of women and is found in Maputo, the provinces of Cabo Delgado and Nampula and the Island of Mozambique. Of Arab origin, the dance is performed to celebrate Islamic festivals and holidays. The dance is traditionally performed by dancers moving just the top halves of their bodies and accompanied by songs and tambourine-like drums.

== History ==
The origins of tufo are unclear, although on the Island of Mozambique, legend has it that the dance began at the time when the Islamic prophet Muhammad migrated to Medina. He was welcomed by his followers with songs and dances praising God, accompanied by tambourines. Since Muhammad approved of these dances, they continued to be performed at religious festivals. Tufo probably arrived in Mozambique in the 1930s, brought by a tradesman from Kilwa called Yussuf. The name probably derives from an Arabic name for the tambourines used in the dance, ad-duff. This word became adufe or adufo in Portuguese, and then tufo.

The dance has also been heavily influenced by the matrilineal Makhuwa culture. Despite its Muslim origins, tufo has spread beyond the communities and context of Islam. Although still performed at religious feasts, tufo songs may also contain social or political themes.

== Performance ==
Historically tufo was performed by both male and female dancers but now men usually only dance on rare occasions. Tufo dance groups comprise 15–20 women and are accompanied by four men or women on flat tambourine-like drums. All of the dancers sing although there are usually lead singers. Traditionally, tufo dancers danced while kneeling down, rhythmically moving the top halves of their bodies. More recently tufo choreography has evolved such dancers may stand and move their whole bodies about.

Tufo songs are transmitted orally and may be composed by one of the dancer's or by the group's poet. They are usually in the Emakhuwa language but may also be in Arabic or Portuguese. The dancers must wear matching scarves and capulanas, which are a kind of sarong made from brightly coloured printed cloth. Each dance requires a new capulana to be worn.
