= Noémia de Sousa =

Mozambican poet (1926–2002)

- Born: Carolina Noémia Abranches de Sousa Soares; 20 September 1926; Catembe, Mozambique
- Died: 4 December 2002 (aged 76); Cascais, Portugal
- Other name: Vera Micaia

Carolina Noémia Abranches de Sousa Soares, known as Noémia de Sousa (20 September 1926 – 4 December 2002), was a poet from Mozambique who wrote in the Portuguese language. She was also known as Vera Micaia. She was of mixed Portuguese and Bantu descent. De Sousa's poetry and involvement in Moçambicanidade was a large part of the anti-colonial literary movement of Mozambique.

== Life ==
Noémia de Sousa was born of mixed-race heritage in Catembe, on the south side of the bay across from the Mozambican capital Lourenço Marques. Her father was a descended from a Luso-Afro-Goan family from the island of Mozambique; her maternal grandfather was German. Her father taught her to read at the age of four, four years before he died.

De Sousa wrote often in her early years but did not publish her work until the age of 22 in 1948. From that year on, she published her work frequently for the next three years.

Moving to Portugal by the age of 25, de Sousa lived in Lisbon, working as a translator from 1951 to 1964. She then left for Paris, where she worked for the local consulate of Morocco. She went back to Lisbon in 1975 and became a member of the ANOP.

She worked with several newspapers and magazines throughout her life. Some of her most notable collaborations were with Mensagem (CEI); Mensagem (Luanda); Itinerário; Notícias do Bloqueio (Porto, 1959); O Brado Africano; Moçambique 58; Vértice (Coimbra), Sul (Brazil).

== Writing career ==
In the early 1950s, de Sousa became involved in the Moçambicanidade movement. During this period anti-colonial literature in Mozambique was at its peak and de Sousa was one of many Mozambican women writers active in the resistance. One of de Sousa's initial contributions to the movement was sharing her literary works with news outlets that supported the resistance. De Sousa wrote an impactful poem, "Poema para uma Infância Distante", that was published in a resistance news publication. This prominent literary work was one that played an immense role in the spread of cultural identity and awareness in the Moçambicanidade movement.

=== Moçambicanidade ===
Moçambicanidade was the name for a new and revolutionary literature that spread throughout Mozambique during the 1940s and 1950s. The literate culture of Mozambique shifted its focus from European styles to Mozambican cultural awareness, anti-colonialism, and political activism. This literary movement was an open platform for the citizens of Mozambique to open dialogue on issues concerning race, class, and politics. Both men and women were involved in this revolutionary literary movement.

The three major journals in support of and associated with Moçambicanidade were, O Brado Africano, Itinerário, and Msabo.

Noémia de Sousa was regularly published in O Brado Africano, and from 1949 she organized, directed, and edited the women's columns until she left for Portugal in 1951. During de Sousa's time at O Brado Africano, she focused the conversation on African identity, black pride, and indigenous feminism. She often published her work under the name, Vera Micaia.

== Works ==
- Sangue Negro, Maputo: Associação dos Escritores Moçambicanos, 2001.
- "If You Want to Know Me" - this poem appears in many anthologies, including in Margaret Dickinson (ed.), When Bullets Begin to Flower, and Margaret Busby (ed.), Daughters of Africa (1992).
