= Malangatana Ngwenya =

Mozambican painter and poet (1936–2011)

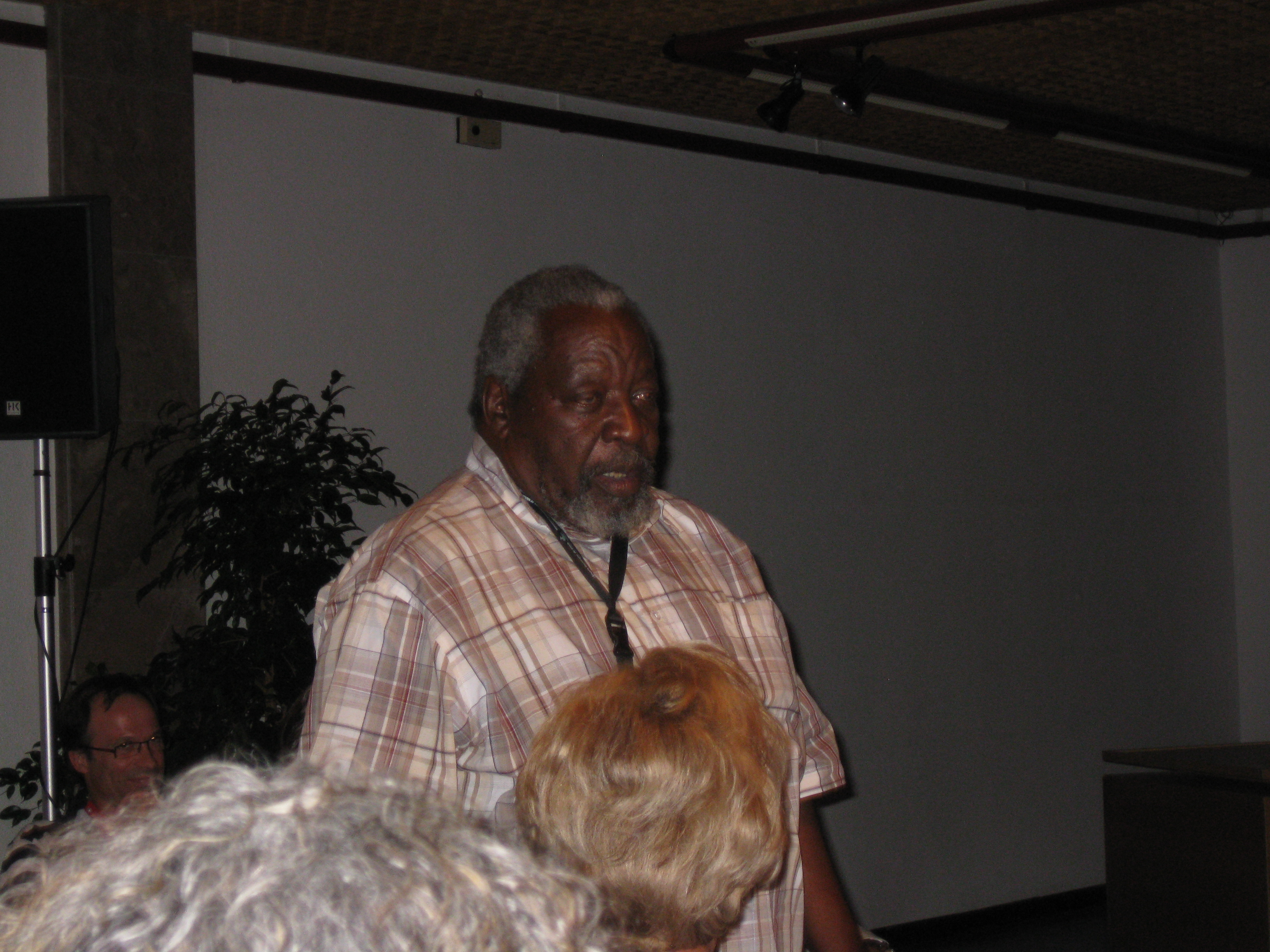
- Born: Malangatana Valente Ngwenya; 6 June 1936; Matalana, Portuguese Mozambique
- Died: 5 January 2011 (aged 74); Matosinhos, Portugal
- Other names: Malangatana
- Occupations: Artist, poet

Malangatana Valente Ngwenya (6 June 1936 – 5 January 2011) was a Mozambican painter and poet. He frequently exhibited work under his first name alone, as Malangatana. He died on 5 January 2011 in Matosinhos, Portugal.

== Life ==
Born in Matalana, a village in the south of Portuguese Mozambique, Ngwenya spent his early life attending mission schools and helping his mother on the farm, while his father worked in the Transvaal region as a miner. After his mother suffered a mental health crisis, Malangatana lived by himself, supported by relatives for a period. At the age of 12, he went to the city of Lourenço Marques (now Maputo) to find work, becoming ball boy for a tennis club in 1953. This allowed him to resume his education, and he took night classes, through which he developed an interest in art. He was encouraged by Augusto Cabral, a member of the tennis club, who gave him materials and helped him to sell his art, and also by Pancho Guedes, another member of the tennis club.

Nude with Flowers (1962)

In 1958, Ngwenya attended some functions of Nucleo de Arte, a local artists' organization, and received support from the painter Ze Julio. The next year Ngwenya exhibited publicly for the first time, as part of a group show; two years later came his first solo exhibition, at the age of 25. After his initial Mozambique debut, Malangatana began to receive international attention. Helped by his association and promotion from Pancho Guedes, with whom he would co-exhibit during his first international exhibition in Nigeria in 1961. This kicked off a period of prolific international exhibitions for Malangatana, and he would go on to exhibit in South Africa, Nigeria, Rhodesia, Angola, France, England, Pakistan, India and, possibly, the USA over the next three years.

In 1964, Ngwenya, who had joined the nationalistic FRELIMO guerrilla, was detained by the PIDE, the Portuguese secret police of the Estado Novo regime, and spent 18 months in jail. He was given a grant from the Lisbon-based Gulbenkian Foundation in 1971, and studied engraving and ceramics in Portugal, Europe. Back to Mozambique, Africa, his art was exhibited several times in both Lourenço Marques and Lisbon until Independence.

After the independence of Mozambique, due to the events of the Carnation Revolution of April 1974, Ngwenya openly rejoined FRELIMO, now the single-party communist organization that was ruling the new country, and worked in political mobilization events and alphabetization campaigns. In 1979, he participated in the exhibition Moderne Kunst aus Afrika, which was organised in West Berlin as part of the program of the first Horizonte - Festival der Weltkulturen.

After 1981, he worked full-time as an artist. His work was shown throughout Africa, and is in the collection of the National Museum of African Art in Washington, DC. In addition, he executed numerous murals, including for FRELIMO and UNESCO. A large mural by him decorated the stairwell of the original building housing the Africa Centre, London, in King Street, Covent Garden. The mural was installed in the new premises of the Africa Centre, opened in Southwark in June 2022.

Ngwenya also helped to start a number of cultural institutions in Mozambique, and was a founder of the Mozambican Peace Movement. He was awarded the Nachingwea Medal for his Contribution to Mozambican Culture, and was made a Grande Oficial da Ordem do Infante D. Henrique. In 1997, he was named a UNESCO Artist for Peace and received a Prince Claus Award.

He was awarded a degree honoris causa by the University of Évora in 2010.

He died at the age of 74 on 5 January 2011, in Matosinhos, northern Portugal, after a long illness.

Malangatana: The Eye of the Crocodile, the first full-length book on the artist, written by Richard Gray, was published in 2025.

== Mediums and materials ==
Malangatana was a painter, poet and sculptor. For painting, he primarily used oil based paints because of their long drying time. This affordance of the material allowed him to paint figures with soft outlines, as the paint would run slightly after application, blurring the borders, contributing to the surrealist nature of his work. Later in his career, he also embraced screen printing, as with his 2001 work, Untitled.

Malangatana was also a writer, and in 1963 some of his poetry was published in the literary magazine Black Orpheus, and his work was included in the anthology Modern Poetry from Africa, edited by Gerald Moore and Ulli Beier.

== Motifs and iconography ==
Malangatana revived African indigenous aesthetics, performing an anti-colonial identity, dialectically opposed to the imposed colonial structures present in 1960's Mozambique. He undertook this as part of a broader trend in post-colonial African art wherein, "artists gravitated towards (self-identified) indigenous sources", to articulate a previously repressed African identity, while also reclaiming African aesthetics co-opted by European surrealists in the early 20th century – artists with whom Malangatana engaged in artistic dialogue with. Exhibiting this is his employment of surrealist imagery, using bright and contrasting colors to depict supernatural scenes populated by coexisting monsters and people.

Malangatana had a contentious relationship with Christianity that expresses itself in his artwork. While he simultaneously viewed it as an imposed religion, part of the colonial structure that sought to subjugate African people and cultures, the Protestant missionaries in Mozambique were not connected to the colonial government, and were often partners in the struggle for liberation.

This conflict is reflected in his inclusion of Christian iconography in his work as well, such as in Last Judgement. A black background has been overlaid with a series of figures, some realistically human-looking, the rest on a spectrum of metamorphosis, with some having transformed so far that the original human referent cannot be recognized. Free-floating dark demonic faces emerge from the background – making it appear as if the underlying blackness is their body – to suck the blood of the other figures. Blood runs down from where long teeth meet flesh, as the victims stare passively forward. All figures not actively involved in bloodletting stare passively forward towards the viewer, as if waiting for something. The name of the painting gives an indication that they are awaiting God's judgement. A priest stands on the left side of the painting, blood running down his face from his eyes, as if he too is culpable in the carnage on display. Even by their own metrics of morality, the colonial government is indicted. His incorporation of Christian iconography in conjunction represents an Afro-European syncretism that allowed his artwork to speak to an audience across the world.

== Political valences ==
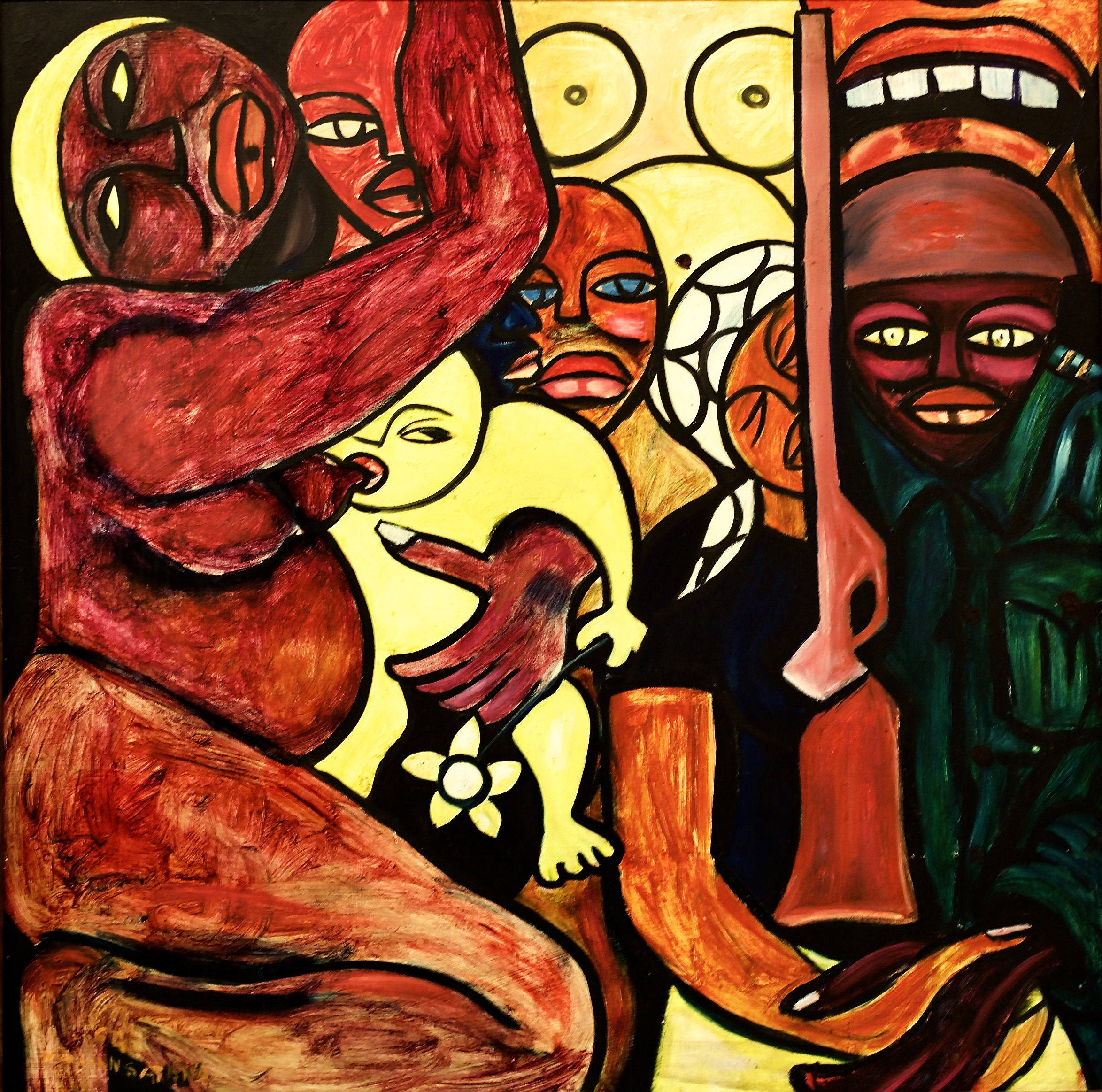
Going to the Independence War and Saying Goodbye (1964)

Malangatana's artwork had special political saliency in the environment of pre-revolution Mozambique, where literacy rates in 1960 were less than 10%. By approaching activism through art, he made politics accessible to the vast majority of the population unable to engage in the written discourse of the time.

Created during the commencement of FRELIMO's Malangatana's 1964 work, Sending off to War (alternatively titled Going to the Independence War and Saying Goodbye), both formally and iconographically exhibits the political potency of his work. Malangatana depicts a mother nursing her child on the left side of the canvas, and a mother and her soldier son holding hands, despite their separation created by the soldier's gun. Free-floating jaws loom behind the soldier, like a crocodile ready to snap, show the dangerous, deadly conditions which the soldier leaves home for. The dichotomy of the nursing mother and the leaving soldier represents an emerging cycle of growth for the nation of Mozambique. Initially, the scene seems tragic, as the soldier's embrace of his mother comes across as a distortion of the serene simplicity of the nursing mother-child relationship depicted on the left, forcing the viewer to make the connection that the soldier leaving to potentially die was once an innocent child being nursed by his mother. The nursing child, painted in bright yellow, holds a yellow flower in his hand. The mother nurses the vivacious child, holding a flower symbolizing emergent growth, showing how the soldier’s sacrifice is for the nation’s future children. This generation, the soldier and his mother, bear the pain of the independence war so that the child will have the opportunity to grow outside the constraints of colonial rule. As Malangatana said, "this birth of a new world in our country is difficult and bloody."

Through this painting, Malangatana articulated a vision of Mozambique growing beyond the colonial past through the process of independence, and in the context of the fermenting revolution, this work was an overt call to arms. Within the colonial environment, where the Portuguese administration systematically sought to marginalize indigenous culture, Malangatana rejected European norms of art, instead espousing a Mozambique nationalist identity.
