= José Craveirinha =

Mozambican poet (1922–2003)

- Born: 28 May 1922; Maputo, Mozambique (then Lourenço Marques, Portuguese Mozambique)
- Died: 6 February 2003 (aged 80); Johannesburg, South Africa
- Occupation: Writer
- Writing career
- Pen name: Mário Vieira, José Cravo, Jesuíno Cravo, J. Cravo, J.C., Abílio Cossa, José G. Vetrinha
- Genre: Poetry

José Craveirinha (28 May 1922 – 6 February 2003) was a Mozambican journalist, story writer and poet, who is today considered the greatest poet of Mozambique. His poems, written in Portuguese, address such issues as racism and the Portuguese colonial domination of Mozambique. A supporter of the anti-Portuguese group FRELIMO during the colonial wars, he was imprisoned in the 1960s. He was one of the African pioneers of the Négritude movement, and published six books of poetry between 1964 and 1997. Craveirinha also wrote under the pseudonyms Mário Vieira, José Cravo, Jesuíno Cravo, J. Cravo, J.C., Abílio Cossa, and José G. Vetrinha.

== Biography ==
Born in Lourenço Marques, Portuguese Mozambique, the child of a Portuguese father and mother of the Ronga ethnicity, Craveirinha was raised in the language and culture of Portugal.

As a journalist, he contributed to numerous Mozambican magazines and newspapers, including O Brado Africano (1918–74), Notícias, Tribuna, Notícias da Tarde, Voz de Moçambique, Notícias da Beira, Diário de Moçambique, and Voz Africana. He became familiar with other poets of the period through his journalism, notably Rui de Noronha (1909–1943), Marcelino dos Santos (1929–2020), and Noemia de Sousa (1926–2003). His works were primarily political in nature. Consistent themes in his work were African self-determination, images of the African landscape, and writing that reflected the influence of African languages.

Craveirinha began his political activity at the Lourenço Marques African Association in the 1950s, an organization tolerated by the colonial Portuguese government, and later became its chairperson. He became involved in clandestine politics in this period, and became a member of a cell of FRELIMO, the leading movement for the liberation of Mozambique from Portuguese rule. He was imprisoned in solitary confinement by the Portuguese PIDE police in 1965, a year after his publication of his first collection of poetry, Chigubo.^{A} He was released from prison in 1969.

When FRELIMO seized power in 1974, was appointed vice-director of the national press. He was the first president of Association of Mozambican Writers (Associação dos Escritores Moçambicanos), and served from 1982 and 1987. The association established the José Craveirinha Prize for Literature (Prémio José Craveirinha de Literatura) in 2003. Craveirinha was awarded the Prémio Camões, the world's highest honour for Lusophone literature, in 1991. He is noted as the first African writer to win the prize. He was considered several times for the Nobel Prize for Literature. In 2003, Craveirinha was declared a "national hero" by President Joaquim Chissano of Mozambique, who praised Craveirinha's literary contribution to the fight against colonialism.

Despite his literary acclaim, Craveirinha was hesitant to have his works appear in print, and a large body of his work from the pre- and post-colonial periods remains unpublished. His wife Maria died in October 1977. Craveirinha wrote numerous poems after her death that were first published under the title Maria in 1988, and in a much fuller form in a second edition in 1998.

Craveirinha also played football and coached other athletes. He arranged an athletic scholarship in the United States for Maria de Lurdes Mutola, who won a gold medal in track and field at the Olympics in 2000, and his son Stelio also held the national long jump record.

Craveirinha died at the age of 80 while undergoing treatment in Johannesburg, South Africa, in 2003.

== Prizes ==
- “Prémio Cidade de Lourenço Marques”, 1959
- “Prémio Reinaldo Ferreira”, Centro de Arte e Cultura da Beira, 1961
- “Prémio de Ensaio”, Centro de Arte e Cultura da Beira, 1961
- “Prémio Alexandre Dáskalos”, Casa dos Estudantes do Império, Lisbon, Portugal, 1962
- “Prémio Nacional de Poesia de Itália”, Italy, 1975
- “Prémio Lotus”, Associação de Escritores Afro-Asiáticos, 1983
- “Nachingwea Medal” of the government of Mozambique, 1985
- Medalha de Mérito, Secretaria de Estado da Cultura de São Paulo, Brazil, 1987
- "Grau de Oficial Grão-Mestre", Ordem Nacional do Cruzeiro do Sul, Brazil, 1990
- "Prémio Camões", Associação de Escritores Afro-Asiáticos, 1991
- "Prémio Vida Literária", AEMO – Associação de Escritores Moçambicanos, 1997
- "Grau de Comendador da Ordem Infante Dom Henrique", Portugal, 1997
- "Ordem de Amizade e Paz", Moçambique, 1997
- "Prémio Consagração Fundac – Rui de Noronha", Mozambique, 1999
- "Prémio Voices of Africa", Ordfront/Leopard Publishing House – Sweden, 2002
- “Grau de Doutor Honoris Causa”, Eduardo Mondlane University – Mozambique, 2002
- “Medalha de Ouro da Comuna de Concesio (Brescia)”
- “Medalha de Ouro do Município de Aljezur”, Portugal
- “Medalha de Ouro do Primeiro Grau do Município de Sintra”, Portugal

== Books published ==
- Chigubo (poetry). Lisbon: Casa dos Estudantes do Império, 1964; 2d ed. Maputo: INLD, 1980.
- Cantico a un dio di Catrame (poetry, bilingual Portuguese–Italian). Translation and preface by Joyce Lussu. Milan, Italy: Lerici, 1966.
- Karingana ua Karingana (poetry, “Era uma vez”). Lourenço Marques [Maputo]: Académica, 1974; 2d ed. Maputo: INLD, 1982.
- Cela 1 (poetry). Maputo: INLD, 1980.
- Izbranie (selected works, in Russian). Moscow, USSR: Molodoya Gvardiya, 1984.
- Maria (poetry). Lisbon, Portugal: ALAC (África Literatura Arte e Cultura), 1988.
- Voglio essere tamburo (poetry). Venezia, Italia: Centro Internazionale della grafica di Venezia – Coop, 1991.
- Babalaze das Hienas (poetry). Maputo: AEMO, 1997.
- Hamina e outros contos (poetry). Maputo: Njira, 1997.
- Contacto e outras crónicas. Maputo: Centro Cultural Português, 1999
- Poesia Toda (poetry). Lisboa, Portugal: Caminho, 2000.
- Obra Poética (poetry). Maputo: UEM, 2002.
- Dikter (poetry). Stockholm: Ordfront, 2002.
- Poemas da Prisão (poetry). Maputo: Njira, 2003.
- Poesia Erótica (poetry). Maputo: Texto Editores, 2004.

== Footnotes ==
A.Later published with the spelling altered to Xigubo. The term is from the Ronga language and refers to a warrior dance of the Ronga ethnic group.
