= História do Futuro =

Book

Histoire du futur
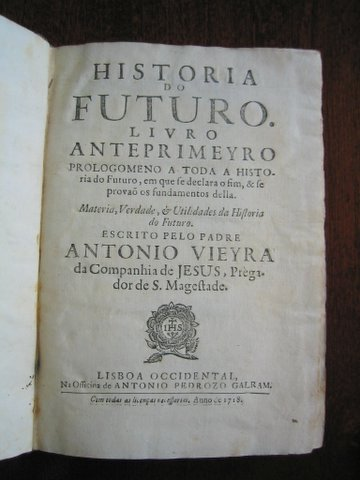
- Page de titre de l'édition originale.
- Author: António Vieira
- Original title: História do Futuro
- Language: portuguese
- Genre: utopia
- Publication date: 1718
- Publication place: Brazil

História do Futuro (English: History of the Future, full title is História do Futuro: Livro Anteprimeiro) is a book written by Portuguese priest António Vieira in the mid-17th century and published posthumously in 1718.

== Author ==
António Vieira (1608–1697) was a prominent figure of the Brazilian Baroque prose, known for his sermons. His works were characterized by a desire to establish a Portuguese and Catholic empire governed by civic zeal and justice, which often led to political problems and suspicions of heresy.

== Content ==
According to writer Roberto de Sousa Causo, with História do Futuro, Vieira wrote the first utopian narrative in Portuguese, in which he sought to revive the millenarian and messianic myth of the Fifth Empire, a Christian and Portuguese empire dominating the world, succeeding the four famous empires of antiquity: Assyrian, Persian, Greek, and Roman.

This unfinished text is in fact the first part of a much larger book. It is made up of twelve chapters: three dealing with the "matter of future history"; five developing its various uses; and four on the truth of future history.

== History and editions ==
The writing of the book began in 1649, according to Sorel, or around 1665, according to Bosi, but it was only posthumously published in Lisbon in 1718. Despite being an unfinished fragment, it aroused great interest and also suspicions of heresy.

The first edition consisted of only a few autograph fragments, complete and incomplete copies, and was considered highly defective. Subsequent editions, including the 1953 edition by Hernâni Cidade, did not improve significantly. In 1976, a reference edition was published in Münster by the Dutch publisher Jose van den Besselaar, considered of high quality with extensive commentary and consisting of two volumes.

Vítor Amaral de Oliveira considers Vieira's work, along with Bandarra's Trovas, to be one of the two most important texts in Sebastianism.
