= Chapel of Our Lady of Help =

Roman Catholic church in Bahia, Brazil

- Capela de Nossa Senhora da Ajuda
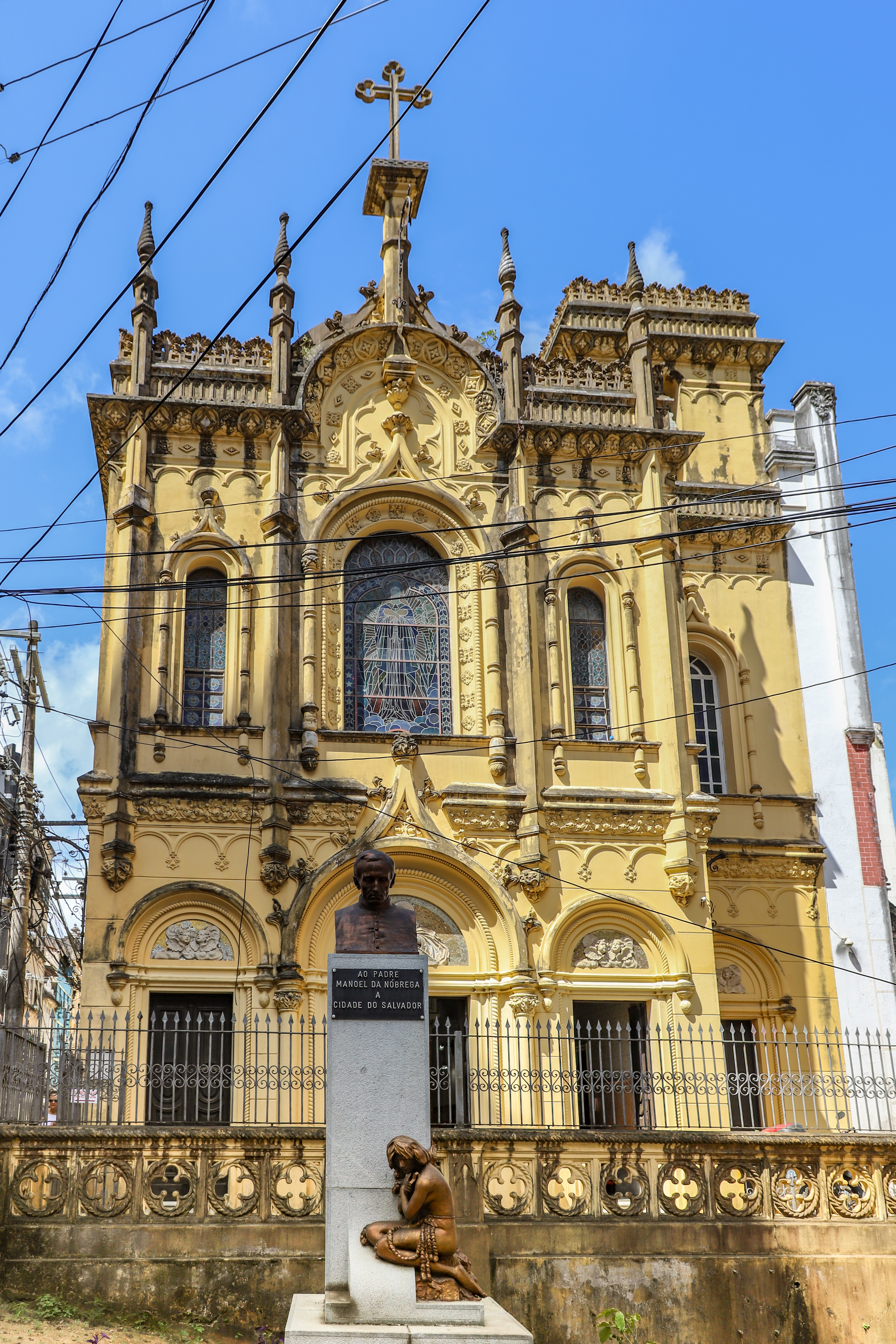
- Chapel of Our Lady of Help (Capela de Nossa Senhora da Ajuda), Salvador

- Location of the Chapel of Our Lady of Help in Brazil

Religion
- Affiliation: Catholic
- Rite: Roman
- Ownership: Roman Catholic Archdiocese of São Salvador da Bahia
- Patron: Our Lady of Help

Location
- Municipality: Salvador
- State: Bahia
- Country: Brazil
- Interactive map of Chapel of Our Lady of Help
- Coordinates: 12.975979°S 38.512960°W

Architecture
- Architect: Julio Conti
- Style: Neo-Manueline
- Completed: 1932
- Elevation: 110.5 m (363 ft)

National Historic Heritage of Brazil
- Designated: 1938
- Reference no.: 122

The Chapel of Our Lady of Help (Portuguese: Capela de Nossa Senhora da Ajuda, Capela da Ajuda) is a 20th-century Roman Catholic church in Salvador, Bahia, Brazil. It sits on the site of a church of the same name built by the Jesuits in 1549, one of the first in Brazil. The present church was designed by the Italian architect Julio Conti in the Neo-Manueline style and consecrated in 1932. It is owned by the Roman Catholic Archdiocese of São Salvador da Bahia, is dedicated to Our Lady of Help, and houses numerous original works of art of the early colonial period. The Chapel of Our Lady of Help was listed as a historic structure by National Institute of Historic and Artistic Heritage (IPHAN) in 1938 and is part of the Historic Center of Salvador UNESCO World Heritage Site.

== History ==
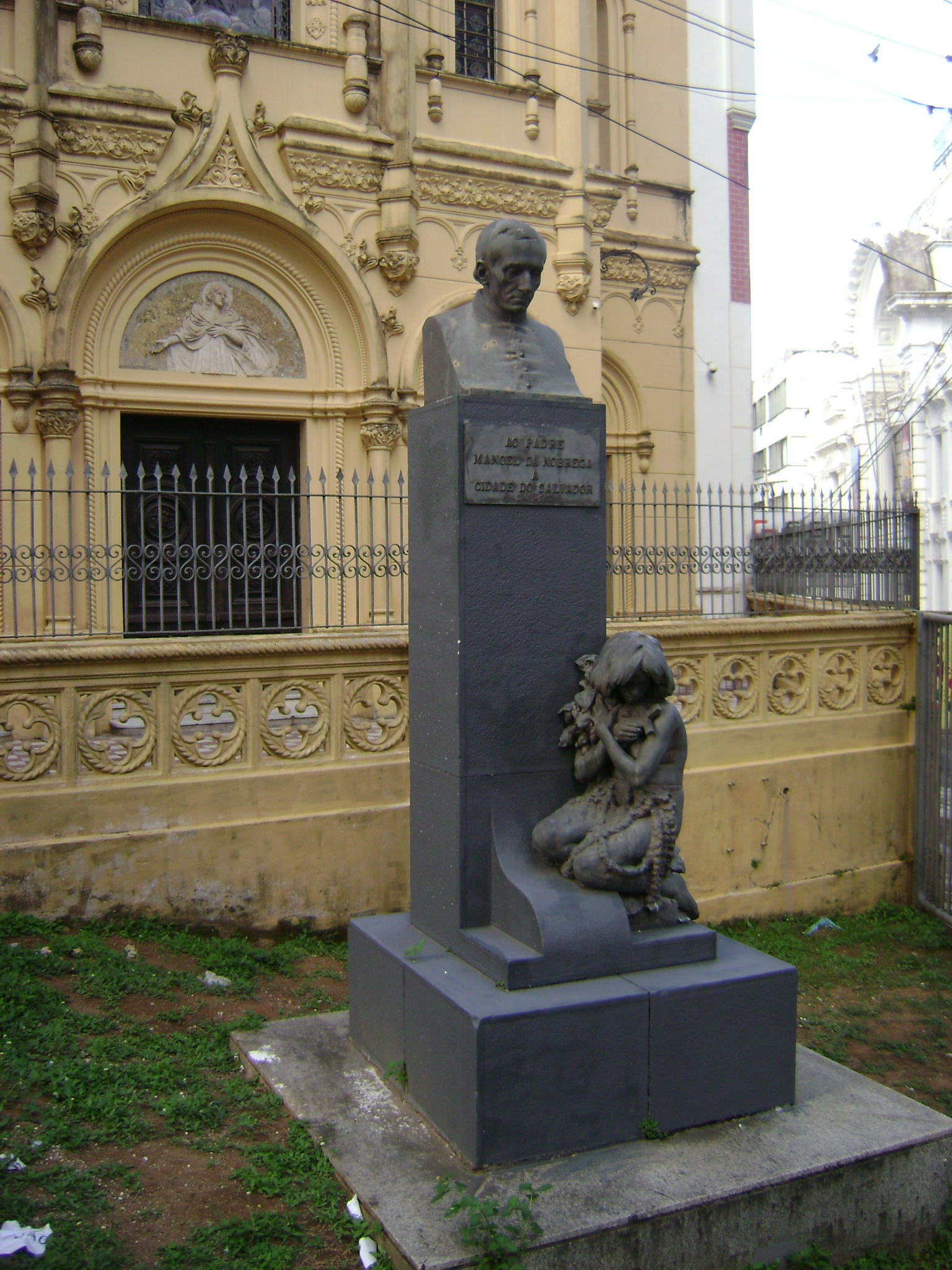
Statue of Manuel da Nóbrega (1517–1570)

The first Jesuits arrived in Brazil in the Armada of the first Governor-General, Tomé de Sousa. The Jesuits built the first Chapel of Our Lady of Help in 1549 under the supervision of Manuel da Nóbrega (1517–1570). It was a simple structure with thatched roof, and was built as part of the construction of the city of Salvador, and was located inside the enclosure of the upper city of Salvador, which at time was surrounded by a palisade for the protection of the settlers. The church was dedicated to Our Lady of Help, which was the name of one of the ships of the fleet of Tomé de Sousa.

In addition to serving the Jesuits, the church served as a parish headquarters; Manuel Lourenço as the first priest of the parish. With the creation of the Diocese of Bahia in 1551, the bishop Dom Pedro Fernandes Sardinha (1496-1556) converted the church into the first cathedral of Bahia, called the "Sé da Palha" (Straw See), and settled in close vicinity to the church. Both Diocese and the Jesuits began to occupy a pieces of land outside the walls of the city later in the 16th century; the bishops erected a cathedral proper, and the Jesuits constructed a separate college and church.

Chapel of Our Lady of Help had to be rebuilt by the mid-16th century; a structure of stone and lime was completed in 1579 by Bishop Sardinha. A commemorative inscription was found with the date during a renovation in 1877. The chapel remained the property of the Jesuits until their expulsion from Brazil in 1759. The church was then abandoned. It remained in disuse until 1823, when it was transferred to a religious brotherhood, the Irmandade do Senhor do Bom Jesus do Passos e Vera Cruz (Brotherhood of the Lord of Bom Jesus do Passos and Vera Cruz). The colonial-period church was demolished in 1912 under the direction of Archbishop Jerônimo Tomé da Silva (1849–1924) during a large-scale urban reform of Salvador. The structure was split down the middle to accommodate a small access road behind the current structure.

The present Chapel of Our Lady of Help was constructed to the front of the footprint of the old structure. It was designed by the Italian architect Júlio Conti and consecrated in 1932. A bust of Father Manuel da Nóbrega was placed in front of the church in the same year.

== Structure ==
The Chapel of Our Lady of Help consists of a nave, choir, a single lateral chapel, and sacristy. It has a small fenced-in church yard; the statue of Father Nóbrega sits outside of the fence.

=== Interior ===
The interior of the Chapel of Our Lady of Help is home to numerous colonial-period pieces of art. The image of Our Lady of Help is reputably the same image brought by Tome de Souza in 1549; it is located on the high altar of the church. The wood pulpit dates to the 17th century; António Vieira (1608-1697), the Portuguese Jesuit preacher and writer, delivered several sermons from the same pulpit, namely, the Sermon for the Good Success of the Arms of Portugal Against Those of Holland in 1640. An image of Christ, titled Nosso Senhor dos Passos (Our Lord of the Stations of the Cross), is located in the sacristy and is the work of Félix Pereira Guimarães. A second image of Christ of the same name is located in the lateral chapel of the church; it is of unknown authorship but likely from Portugal.

The walls and ceilings are decorated with paintings by Oreste Sercille and his son Bruno Sercille. The main stained glass window of the church, visible at the center of the façade of the church, has an image of Our Lady of Help surrounded by lilies and a band of stars.

== Protected status ==
The Chapel of Our Lady of Help was listed as a historic structure by the National Institute of Historic and Artistic Heritage in 1938. It was listed in the Book of Historical Works no. 121.

== Access ==
The church is open to the public and may be visited.
