= Holodomor: The Unknown Ukrainian Tragedy (1932–1933) =

2013 book coordinated by José Eduardo Franco and Beata Cieszynska

Holodomor – The Unknown Ukrainian Tragedy (1932-1933)
- Author: José Eduardo Franco and Beata Cieszynska
- Original title: Holodomor : a desconhecida tragédia ucraniana (1932-1933)
- Language: Portuguese
- Subject: Genocide
- Publisher: CompaRes and Grácio Editor
- Publication date: June 2013
- Pages: 208
- ISBN: 978-989-8377-39-5

Holodomor – The Unknown Ukrainian Tragedy (1932-1933) is a book coordinated by José Eduardo Franco and Beata Cieszynska, published by Grácio Editor in June 2013.

This book "is a pioneer of its kind in Portuguese language and context, bringing to the audience touching pages of history that many would want to erase, and still today, after eighty years, lead to controversial readings. The case of the Great Famine in the Soviet Union, known as Holodomor (meaning "death by hunger") belongs to the most extensive and heinous massacres known by the twentieth century, and it’s still unknown by many. It is an artificially induced famine during the years 1932 and 1933 by the Stalinist regime to the peoples of the Soviet Union as a result of the failure of forced collectivization. The Great Famine affected mainly the countries with large and fertile agricultural land, among which the Ukrainian case stands out, whose country, geographically, is the second largest in Europe and where it is estimated that the number of famine victims reached a dozen million".

It is developed by CompaRes - International Association of Iberian-Slavonic Studies and the CLEPUL Research Group 5 of the Centre for Portuguese-speaking and European Literatures and Cultures from the Faculty of Letters, University of Lisbon, "with the aim of contributing to a growing scientific debate whose horizons, as the name implies, cover the cultural Iberian-Slavonic cultural backgrounds".

== Synopsis ==
The book presents its interdisciplinary material in five parts: Historical Approaches; Legal Review; Press Impressions; Artistic Visions and Statements, which are introduced by a foreword by Guilherme d'Oliveira Martins, and two opening texts, the first by José Eduardo Franco and Beata Cieszynska, and the second with the resolution n.º 1723 of the Parliamentary Assembly of the Council of Europe, which treats the Holodomor as a crime against humanity.

The part entitled Historical Approaches contains seven articles with various and comprehensive approaches to the subject on the conditions and historical determinations of the Holodomor, gathering texts of historians, sociologists and political scientists, as Antonio Ramos dos Santos (University of Lisbon); Carlos Gaspar (Portuguese Institute of International Relations of the New University of Lisbon), José Luís Andrade (Historical Society of the Independence of Portugal), Luís de Matos Ribeiro (CompaRes/CLEPUL5), Rui Miguel Ribeiro (Fernando Pessoa University); Henrique Vaz Duarte and António Rosa Mendes (University of the Algarve).

In the second part, Volodymyr Vassylenko, Ukrainian Ambassador in Britain, gives us a legal assessment on the issue of the Holodomor as genocide.

The third part of the book, entitled Press Impressions, comes in two parts. The first subsection is devoted to the review of several mentions on the subject in the Portuguese media, whether from newspapers or magazines, while the second subsection of this part gathers approaches to the activity of the Ukrainian community in Portugal dedicated to the memory and recognition of the Holodomor in Portuguese culture, including an article by Rostyslav Tronenko, former Ambassador of Ukraine in Portugal.

The next part of the book puts the issue of Holodomor in the context of aesthetic language. In view of possible limitations of knowledge of the descriptions of a world so ideologically distant to the Portuguese reader, the Artistic Visions section opens with an article by Rui Bebiano (University of Coimbra-Centre for Social Studies), in the context of the Gulag (whose repressive function acquired particular relevance during the agricultural collectivization and famine).

Following are the plastic conceptualizations developed by Portuguese artists Manuel Valente Alves, Tiago Pimentel, Henrique Vaz Duarte and Francisco Providência, in honor and memory of the victims of the Holodomor.

Finally, the part entitled Statements contain a broad list of acts issued in reference to the Holodomor by various institutions: International Organizations, National Parliaments, Political and Religious Leaders, State and Municipal Regional Assemblies, Academic Community and ceremonies in memory of the victims.

In short, "this book gives the reader a very comprehensive and interdisciplinary historical and sociological analysis of the Holodomor and of acts of national and international recognition, but also gives an account of the complex process of its entry into the common consciousness, through the widespread journalistic, artistic and cultural dissemination. It is undoubtedly a Portuguese contribution to contemporary history, also providing justice to the memory of the millions of victims of this great and yet so unknown tragedy".

== See also ==
- Holodomor
