= Sebastianism =

Portuguese messianic myth

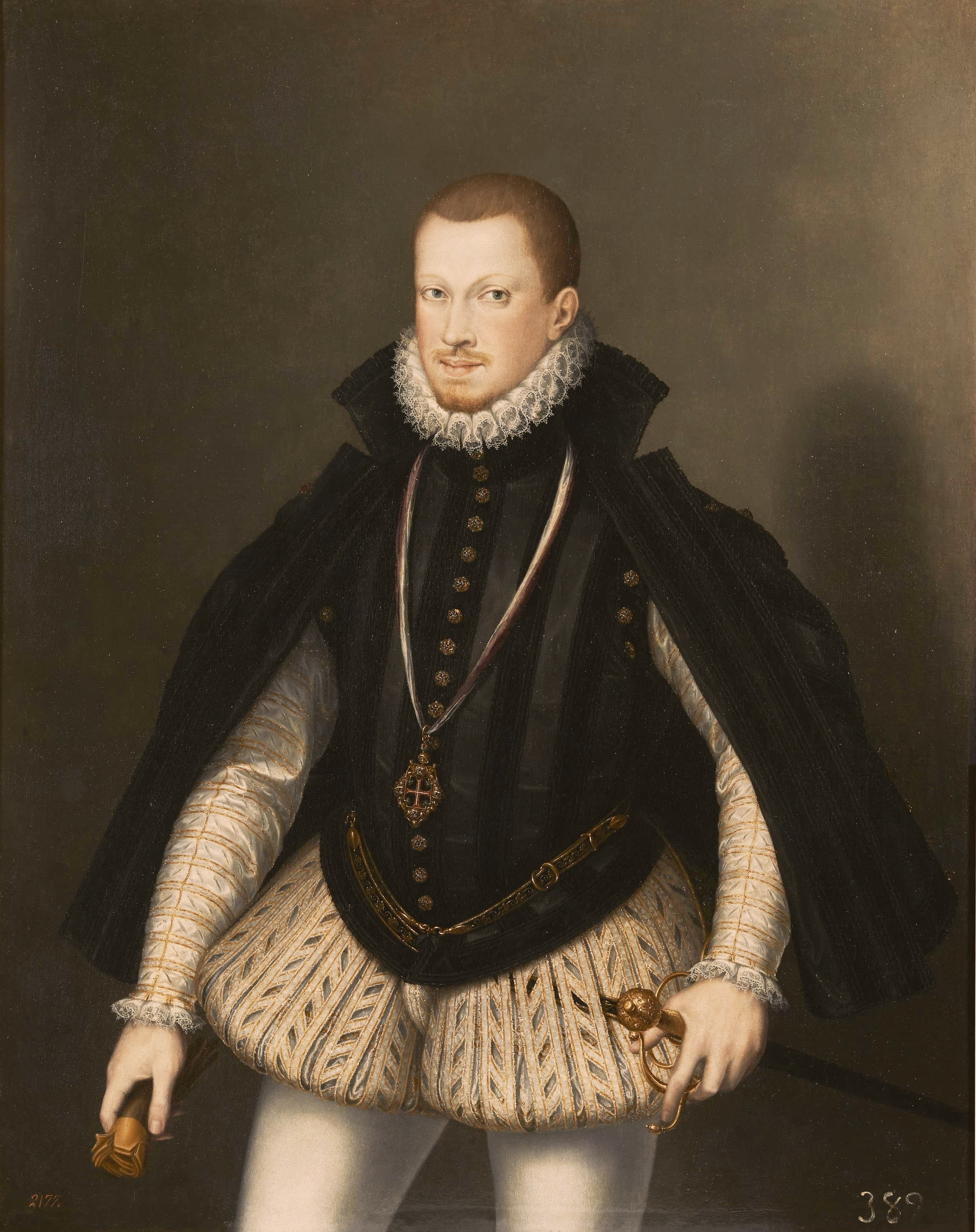
King Sebastian of Portugal

Sebastianism (Portuguese: Sebastianismo) is a Portuguese messianic myth, based on the belief that King Sebastian of Portugal, who disappeared in the 1578 battle of Alcácer Quibir, would reappear and rescue Portugal from some future crisis. The belief gained momentum after an interpretation by priest António Vieira of the second chapter of the Book of Daniel (Daniel 2) and the Book of Revelation. In the study of folklore, it is an example of the king asleep in mountain motif.

Sebastianism had a heavy influence on the poetic movement of the 1910s called saudosismo and namely on the Portuguese author Fernando Pessoa, who wrote about such a hero in his epic Mensagem (The Message).

In Brazil, the most important manifestation of Sebastianism took place in the context of the proclamation of the Republic, when movements defending a return to the monarchy emerged.

Sebastianism is one of the longest-lived and most influential millenarian legends in Western Europe, having had profound political and cultural resonance from Sebastian's death until at least the late 19th century in Brazil.

== Death of Sebastian the King ==
Banner of King Sebastian of Portugal

King Sebastian of Portugal (January 20, 1554 – August 4, 1578) was the grandson of John III, and became heir to the throne due to the death of his father, Crown Prince João Manuel, two weeks before his birth. This period had seen continued Portuguese colonial expansion in Africa, Asia and Brazil, until a dramatic and unlikely succession of plague, bad harvest years, economical depression and the unexpected deaths of all ten of John III's children suddenly threatened the continued existence of Portugal as an independent nation. The young king was educated under the guidance of the Jesuits. Luís de Camões dedicated the Lusiads to King Sebastian.

Almost immediately after coming of age, Sebastian began plans for the conquest of Morocco. The Portuguese landed in Asilah in 1578, and at the Ksar El Kebir the Portuguese, along with mercenaries from various parts of Christendom, were routed along with their ally the deposed Moroccan sultan Abu Abdallah Mohammed II. After the disastrous defeat against the Saadians of Morocco, Sebastian was almost certainly killed in battle.

Many Portuguese doubted the reports of his death however, and some still expected the king to return based on differing accounts of the outcome of the battle. Those who opposed the pretensions of Philip II of Spain to the throne of Portugal tended to support such versions of events, and backed the rule of King Henry or the claims of António, Prior of Crato, during the Portuguese succession crisis of 1580.

After António was defeated and Portugal fell under the rule of the Habsburgs, Philip ordered that a body recovered from the battlefield, identified as Sebastian, be ransomed from the Saadians and paraded throughout Portugal in a funeral procession. The body was, however, found to be in too advanced a state of decay shortly after its recovery to be definitively and conclusively confirmed as Sebastian, and was mostly rejected by Portuguese society as being his.

=== Appearance of imposter pretenders ===
Since Sebastian's body was never definitively identified after his death, during this time, various impostors claimed to be King Sebastian in 1584, 1585, 1595 and 1598.

The first appeared in 1584; he was a commoner of Alcobaça, quickly apprehended and spared execution by a sentence to work in the galleys.

A second imposter was a son of a stone-cutter from the Azores, who had retired to a hermitage. Because of his frequent self-inflicted deprivations and penitences, those in nearby communities proclaimed him to be the king, atoning for the misfortune of his subjects. Despite his initial denials, he finally consented to the acclamation of local peasants. Traveling to Lisbon, he was paraded through the streets on an ass, exposed to the jeers of the populace, and publicly hanged.

A third Sebastian arose in Spain: an Augustinian friar, Miguel dos Santos, who once had been a chaplain of Sebastian and confessor to Dom Antonio, and was ultimately confessor to the nunnery of Madrigal de las Altas Torres, Castile. He met there Gabriel de Espinosa, a baker, whose appearance recalled the person of Sebastian. Dos Santos persuaded him to impersonate Sebastian. María Ana de Austria, a nun who was a cousin of Sebastian via her father John of Austria, supported the claim. The friar and Espinosa were both captured, forced to confess, and hanged.

A fourth impostor arose in Naples, but was transferred to a prison in Spain. His claims were undermined by his inability to speak Portuguese.

== Sebastianism in Portugal ==
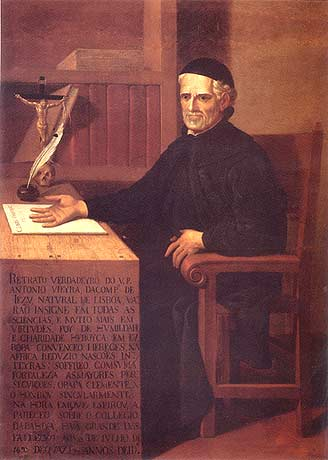
Father António Vieira. 18th century painting

The first and greatest proponent of Sebastianism was a supporter of King António in exile by the name of Dom João de Castro (grandson of the viceroy of India of the same name). After the death of King António, Dom João published a series of writings expounding the idea that King Sebastian was "the Hidden One", foretold to lead Portugal and all Christian nations in the unification of the Earth and the creation of one, last, Fifth Empire that was to succeed the four previous great earthly empires, based on the Book of Daniel, the Book of Revelation, and most importantly the messianic verses of António Gonçalves de Bandarra, written a few decades prior. He published three books and wrote over twenty other volumes of manuscripts during his exile in Paris, between the end of the 16th century and 1623. The most important was Paráfrase e Concordância de Algumas Profecias de Bandarra, published in 1603. They proved especially popular among the Portuguese who resented foreign rule, and were quoted by later Sebastianists and proponents of a Fifth Monarchy, such as Sebastião de Paiva in Tratado da Quinta Monarquia and Félix da Costa in Exposição do XI, XII & XII Capítulos do IV Livro do Profeta Esdras.

The idea that Sebastian awaited the proper time to reveal himself on an unknown island spread spontaneously. It was named by some as the Ilha Encoberta ("Shrouded Island") and by others as Antilia, reminiscent of unidentified mythical islands which geographers, sailors and cartographers hypothesized to exist, or claimed to have sighted and even visited.

When Portugal revolted from Habsburg rule in 1640, King John IV of Portugal had to swear to yield his throne to Sebastian, who would have been 86 years old by that point.

The verses of Bandarra influenced the Jesuit priest António Vieira, one the greatest literary figures in the history of the Portuguese-speaking world and an ardent supporter of King John IV. In his book História do Futuro he anticipated a ruler who would inaugurate an epoch of unparalleled prosperity that was to unite the world under the spiritual leadership of the Pope and the temporal leadership of a Portuguese king, and would last a millennium till the coming of the Antichrist. Vieiras História together with Bandarras Trovas are two of the most important texts for Sebastianism. Accused of heresy, he was arrested by the Inquisition from October 1665 to December 1667, and finally imposed a sentence which prohibited him from teaching, writing or preaching.

The Inquisition condemned Sebastianism and actively sought to confiscate any writings associated with it, particularly the verses of Bandarra, in an effort to stamp out the belief, though with little success. In 1727 the epitaph from the grave of Bandarra was removed by order of Chief-Inquisitor Dom Veríssimo de Lencastre.

The latent popularity of Sebastianism persisted throughout the 18th century. In 1752, a Sebastianist predicted that a terrible earthquake would destroy Lisbon on All Saints' Day. After the Lisbon earthquake struck on All Saints' Day three years later (November 1, 1755), there was a surge of converts to Sebastianism. The most severe blow to Sebastianism was dealt by the violent persecution during the premiership of the Marquis of Pombal, as part of his campaign against the Jesuits, which he expelled from the country under the accusation of, among other things, fabricating Sebastianism and the verses of Bandarra, by their association with António Vieira. In 1761 two men were arrested and delivered to the Inquisition for propagating Sebastianist ideas.

Notwithstanding continued official condemnation, the verses of Bandarra remained in issue, as a popular form of folk-literature. In 1803 the Marquis of Nisa sponsored a new edition of the verses of Bandarra, at Nantes, France.

During the Napoleonic Wars, the occupation of Portugal by French forces under the command of marshal Junot sparked a revival of Sebastianism. Some of the prophecies of Bandarra were seen as being confirmed particularly by the fact that marshal Junot ordered the universal extraction of taxes equally from every Portuguese individual, along with the resulting social unrest. The Napoleonic invasions of Portugal motivated new editions of the verses of Bandarra, in 1809, prefaced by friar José Leonardo da Silva, in 1815 and 1822.

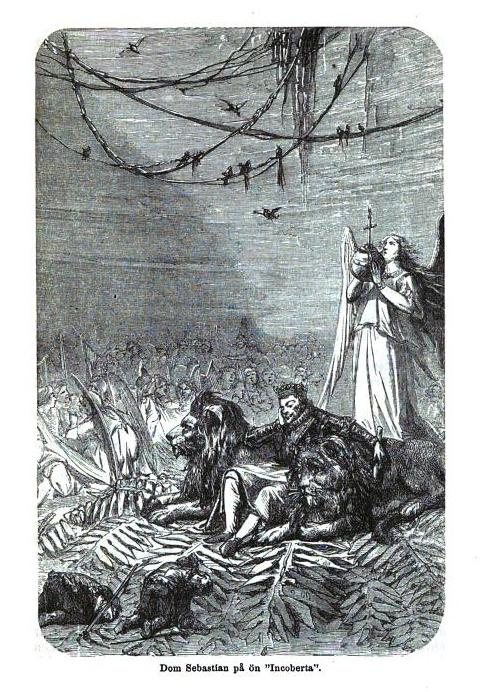
"Dom Sebastian on the Incoberta Island", 1871 Swedish illustration

One of the most important Portuguese authors of the 20th century, the poet Fernando Pessoa built upon Sebastianist motifs. The second part of Mensagem, called Mar Português ("Portuguese Sea"), Pessoa references Portugal's Age of Exploration and its seaborne empire until the death of King Sebastian in 1578. Pessoa brings the reader to the present as if he had woken up from a dream of the past, to fall in a dream of the future: he sees King Sebastian returning and still determined to accomplish a Universal Empire.

The third cycle, O Encoberto ("The Hidden One"), refers to Pessoa's vision of future world peace and the Fifth Empire which, according to Pessoa, is spiritual and not material. After the Age of Force (Vis), and Taedium (Otium) will come Science (understanding) through a reawakening of "The Hidden One", or "King Sebastian". The Hidden One represents the fulfillment of the destiny of mankind, designed by God since before Time, and the accomplishment of Portugal. Sebastian is highly important to the work, as indeed he is referenced in all three parts of Mensagem. He was portrayed as representing the capacity of dreaming, and the belief in the possibility of achieving dreams.

Many Portuguese folk tales, particularly in the Azores, feature King Sebastian, usually riding a white horse, and sometimes followed by companions. Often named as "the enchanted king", they generally involve the monarch appearing before one or a few residents on full moon nights or holy days, such as the feast of Saint John, and asking a simple question (such as "who goes"); a correct answer would dispel the charm the king is under, while a wrong answer will simply result in the king vanishing, to appear on another occasion.

== Sebastianism in Brazil ==
With the proclamation of Brazil as a Republic in 1889, Brazil became a secular state, in contrast to the former Brazilian Empire, where Catholicism had been the official religion. In imperial administration, the church had very important roles: functioning as registrar for births, deaths, weddings, and even for the recording of property.

The coup d'état against the régime of Emperor Pedro II and the republican reforms brought few changes in most people's lifestyle – for example, universal enfranchisement was not enacted —, the greatest change for Brazilians really was the "godless" government. Catholicism and the monarchy had been closely tied and strongly affected Brazilian people. Most of the opposition movements to the republic in the 1890s, 1900s and early 1910s had religious motivations. The character of King Sebastian returned to people's imagination: he would come back to defend the divine right of the Brazilian monarchy, who were directly descended from the Portuguese monarchs, to rule in Brazil and to defend Catholicism, which had been removed from government by the Republic.

The forced abolishment of Catholic marriage and the imposition of mandatory civil marriage was a point of particular contention among the poor but deeply religious people of northern Bahia. An itinerant preacher by the name of Antônio Conselheiro founded the town of Canudos with his followers. The village was very small but offered the Conselheiristas protection, as the location was hard to access. Within two years, as the religious community prospered, Conselheiro convinced several thousand followers to join him, eventually making it the second-largest urban center in Bahia at the time. The settlement was supported by cultivation of crops and export of leather, with residents allowed to retain private property and businesses. "The poor were maintained through donations to the community".

Conselheiro claimed to be a prophet and prophesied the return of king Sebastian. A popular tune sung by minstrels among the community went that "Dom Sebastião has arrived/And he brings many directives/Abolishing the civil union/And conducting marriage./Our King Sebastian/Shall visit us/Regret be on the poor man/Who is [married] under dogs law." He held that "it was the monarch's God-given right to rule", which caused him to be progressively branded as a monarchist figure by the unstable Republic at the time. The ultra-conservative doctrine he preached, implicitly criticizing the "wayward behavior" of many priests, was "attractive" to many sertanejos, and led the Church hierarchy to view him as a "threat to the Church's authority and popularity". In 1893 the community entered into conflict with the magistrate of a neighbouring town, which spun into an ultimately violent confrontation with the state that became the deadliest civil-war in Brazilian history, known as the War of Canudos. Conselheiro perished amidst the fighting and the community was violently razed at the end of a fourth military expedition sent against it, with over 25,000 people being estimated to have been killed.

In the state of Maranhão, there is a belief, especially on the Lençóis Island, on the coast of the state, that King Sebastian would live on this island, having many legends around his figure, how to become an enchanted black bull with a star on the forehead. The leather of the bull of Bumba-meu-Boi, especially those of sotaques of zabumba and the tambourines played with the back of the hand, from the regions of Cururupu and Guimarães, usually have the tip of the horns in gold metal and, embroidered on the forehead, of gold and jewels, in allusion to the legend. Afro-Brazilian religions in the state, such as Tambor de Mina and terecô, also have a special connection with King Sebastian, who is believed to be an "encantado" (an entity with special powers).

== See also ==
- L'Encobert
- Messianism
- Millenarianism
- The Magical Kingdom
- Nero Redivivus legend
- Imam Muhammed al-Mahdi
