= Sermon for the Good Success of the Arms of Portugal Against Those of Holland =

BY Wikipedia

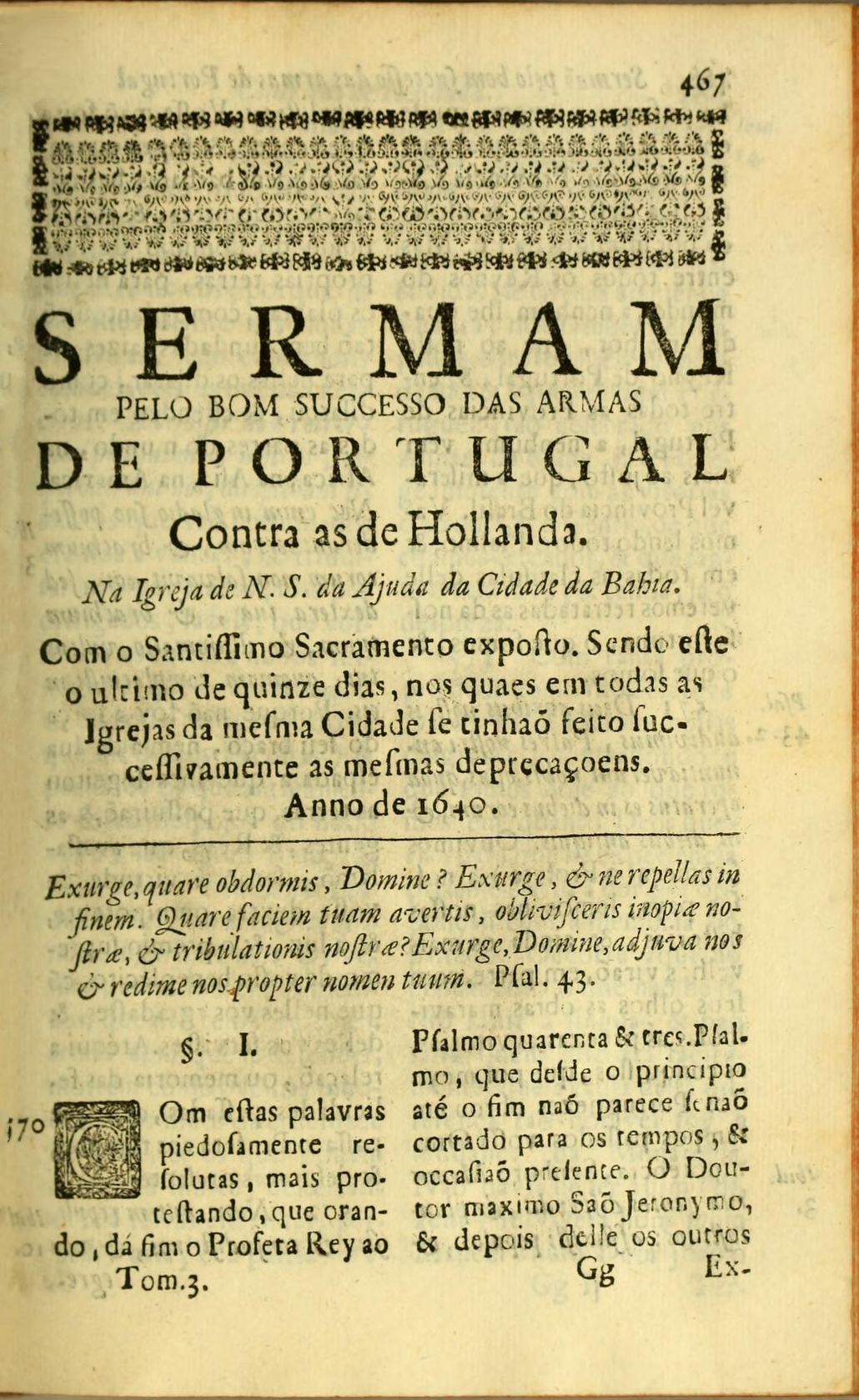
First published edition (Lisbon, 1683), in a collection of António Vieira's sermons.

"Sermon for the Good Success of the Arms of Portugal Against Those of Holland" (Portuguese: Sermão pelo Bom Sucesso das Armas de Portugal Contra as de Holanda) was a sermon preached by Portuguese Jesuit priest António Vieira to the congregation of the Church of Our Lady of Help in Salvador da Bahia, Colonial Brazil, in 1640, in the context of Dutch attempts to take control of the territory of Brazil during the course of the Dutch–Portuguese War.

It was considered by the Abbé Raynal to be "perhaps the most extraordinary discourse ever heard from a Christian pulpit".
