= António Gonçalves de Bandarra =

Portuguese writer (1500–1556)

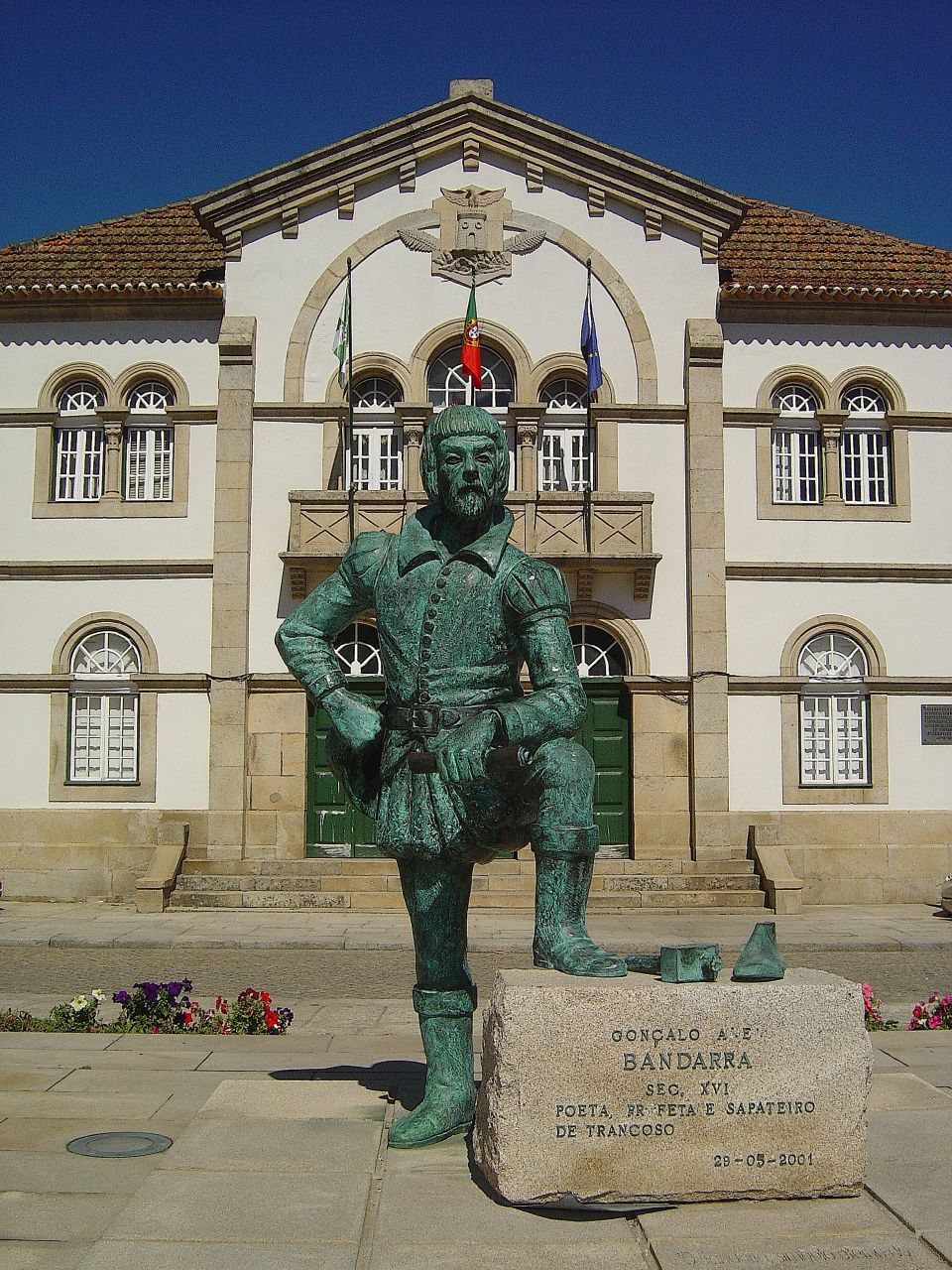
- Statue of Bandarra in Trancoso, Portugal
- Born: 1500; Trancoso, Portugal
- Died: 1556 (aged 55–56); Trancoso, Portugal
- Occupations: Writer, shoemaker

António Gonçalves Annes Bandarra or Gonçalo Annes Bandarra (1500 – 1556) was a Portuguese writer.

== Life and work ==
He was a shoemaker by trade (born rich but lost his wealth). Whether he had Jewish origin or not has been the subject of much speculation. He devoted himself to astrology and to publicising in verse messianic character prophecies famous around 1531. He had a great knowledge of the Old Testament scriptures, from which he created his own interpretations. As an adult he moved to Lisbon at the request of new-Christian mystics and theologians who desired that he had more contact and discussion with the Lisbon community. He was accused by the Portuguese Inquisition of Judaism and his trovas were included in the catalogue of forbidden books, since they aroused interest especially among the new Christians. He faced this tribunal, which deemed him innocent, but he was forced to participate in the 1541 auto-da-fé procession and also to stop interpreting the Bible or writing on theology. After the trial he returned to Trancoso, where he died in 1556.

His work was given the name "Paráfrase e Concordância de Algumas Profecias de Bandarra" (Paraphrase and Concordance of Some Prophecies by Bandarra). It was edited by D. João de Castro (sebastianist grandson of the famous namesake Vice-Roy of Portuguese India). The work was interpreted as a prophecy to the return of King D. Sebastião after his disappearance in the Battle of Alcácer-Quibir in August 1578. In 1815 a new edition appeared with the title "Trovas Inéditas do Bandarra" and between 1822 and 1823 another edition with the title "Verdade e Complemento das Profecias" appeared. The "Trovas do Bandarra" influenced the sebastianist and messianic thought of Priest António Vieira and Fernando Pessoa. Bandarra's prophetics includes three points: the Fifth Empire, the going and return of the Encoberto [Covered One] (after Alcácer-Quibir identified as being el-rei D. Sebastião) and the destinies of Portugal.

== Works ==
- Trovas do Bandarra (Portuguese)
- Trovas Inedìtas de Bandarra (Portuguese)

== See also ==
- David Reuveni
