= Statue of António Vieira =

Public sculpture in Lisbon

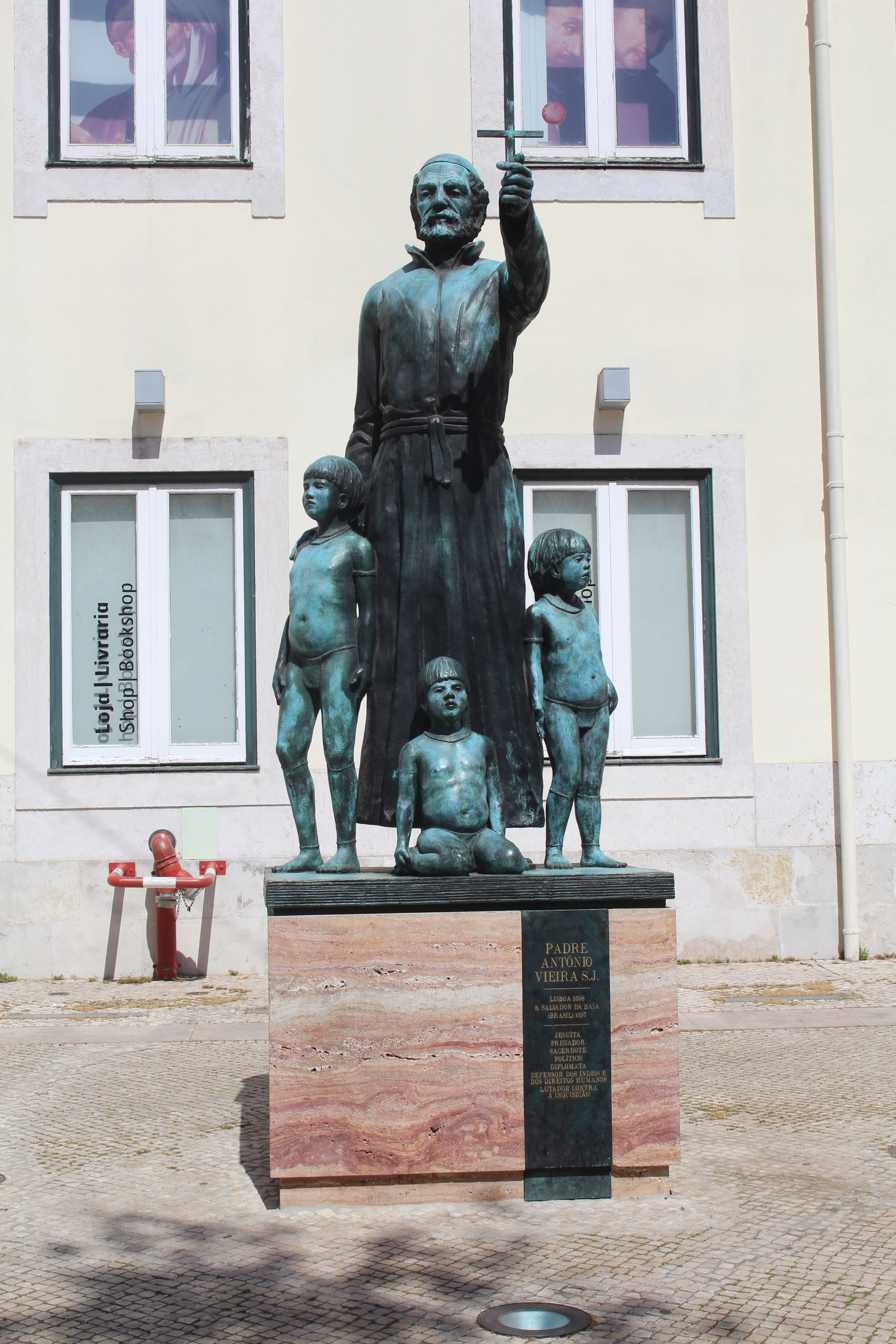
- The statue photographed in 2019
- Artist: Marco Telmo Areias Fidalgo
- Completion date: 2017
- Medium: Bronze sculpture
- Subject: António Vieira
- Location: Lisbon, Portugal; 38.7133°N 9.1431°W

A statue of António Vieira stands in Trindade Coelho Square in the civil parish of Misericórdia in Lisbon, in front of the Church of Saint Roch and the headquarters of the Lisbon Holy House of Mercy. António Vieira (1608–1697) was a noted Jesuit preacher and missionary in Colonial Brazil. It was unveiled in 2017.

== History ==
Originally planned since 2009, the monument commemorating António Vieira was the result of a protocol between the Lisbon City Council and the Lisbon Holy House of Mercy. The final design, by sculptor Marco Telmo Areias Fidalgo, was selected in 2015 by a jury comprising representatives of the City Council, Holy House of Mercy, Society of Jesus, the Directorate-General for Cultural Heritage, and the National Academy of Fine Arts.

It was unveiled on 22 June 2017, in the presence of Mayor Fernando Medina, Cardinal-Patriarch Manuel Clemente (who blessed the statue), Holy House of Mercy Chairman Pedro Santana Lopes, Jesuit priest José Frazão Correia, and priest António Vaz Pinto.

=== Controversy and vandalism ===
Shortly after it was unveiled, in October 2017, the statue was the subject of an organised protest action by anti-racist advocacy group Descolonizando ("Decolonising"), who judged Vieira was "selectively pro-slavery", associated him and the Catholic Church with the Atlantic slave trade to Brazil, and called Jesuit evangelisation "the greatest responsible for Amerindian ethnocide". The planned protest — an homage to the indigenous peoples of the Americas with flowers, candles, signs and a poetry reading — did not take place as the square was occupied by a counter-demonstration by far-right group Associação de Iniciativa Cívica Portugueses Primeiro ("The Portuguese First Civic Association"), with alleged ties to the Hammerskins.

Following the murder of George Floyd on 25 May 2020 during a police arrest in the United States, protests broke out internationally, showing opposition to racism worldwide, with a number of statues and memorials being the subject of protests. In Lisbon, a peaceful demonstration and march of about 10,000 people took place on 6 June without incident. Five days after, on 11 June, the statue of António Vieira was found to have been defaced: the priest's mouth, hands, and habit were covered in red paint, the figures of the indigenous children were branded with hearts, and the word "Decolonise" was graffitied across the plinth. The action was publicly condemned by President Marcelo Rebelo de Sousa, who called it a "truly imbecile" gesture, saying "it is difficult not to know that Father António Vieira was one of the greatest characters in the country's history... he fought for independence, was a great diplomat, was a very progressive man for his time", and showed concern for gratuitous extremism that "does nothing, in practice, to change the living conditions of those who are discriminated". The City Council had the monument cleaned later that same day.
