= António Rosa Mendes =

António Rosa Mendes (1954–2013) was born in Vila Nova de Cacela, Portugal. He was a professor of history at the Algarve University (Portuguese: Universidade do Algarve).

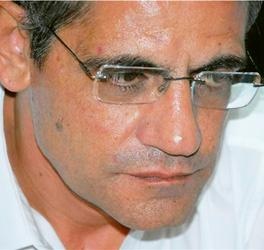
AntónioRosaMendes.

In the year of 2005 he was the president of the Portuguese Cultural Capital in Faro.
