= José Eduardo Franco =

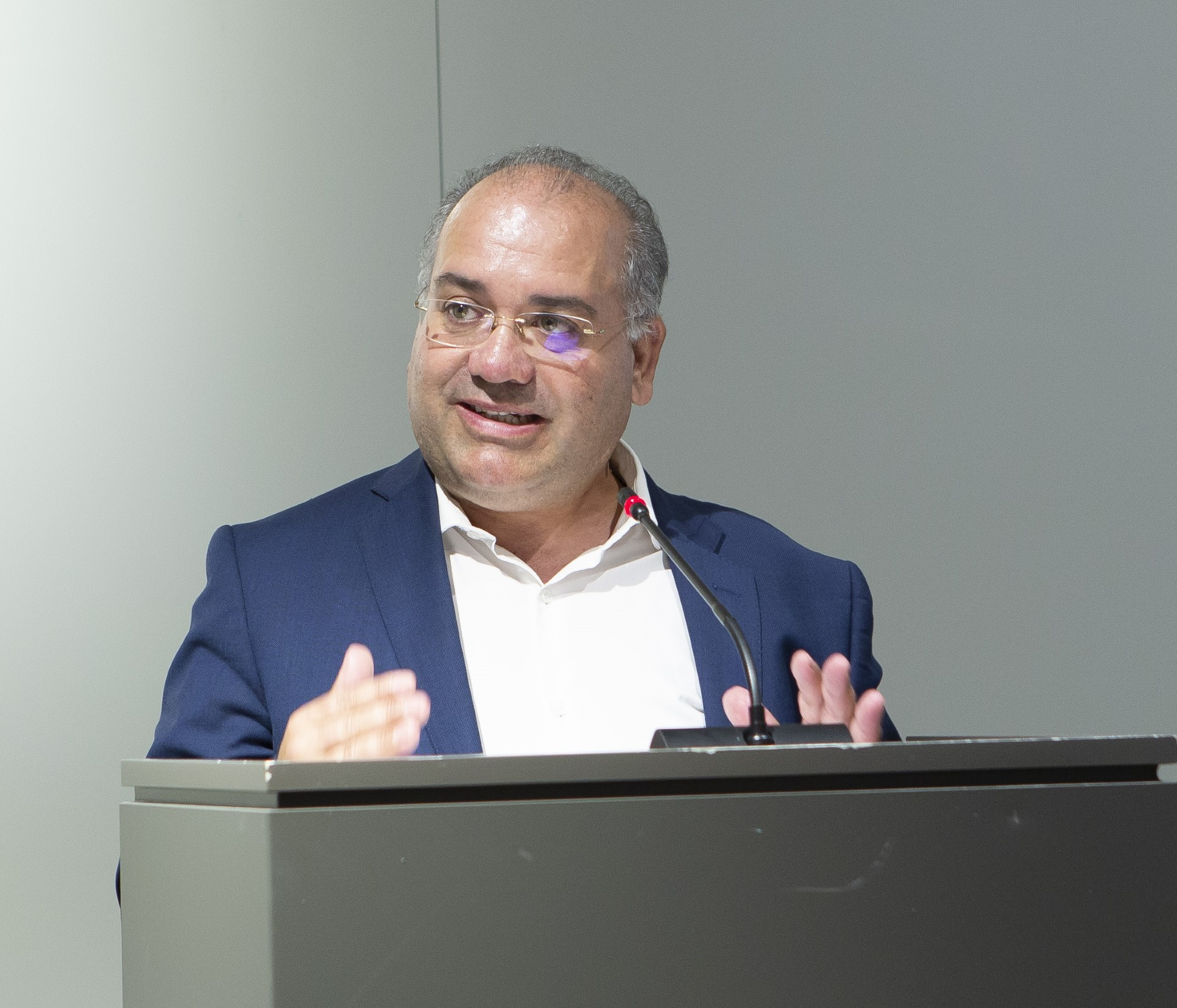
- José Eduardo Franco (2023)
- Born: February 17, 1969 (age 57); Ribeira Grande (Machico, Portugal
- Occupations: Historian, professor, poet and essayist
- Writing career
- Period: 1995 – present
- Genres: Essay, History
- Subject: Portuguese mythology
- Notable works: O Mito de Portugal (2000); O Mito dos Jesuítas em Portugal, no Brasil e no Oriente (2 vols., 2006-2007)
- Notable awards: Medal of Cultural Merit awarded by the Portuguese Government (2015); Mariano Gago Prize for science communication, ex aequo with Carlos Fiolhais (2018)

José Eduardo Franco is a Full Professor of the Aberta University and is the Director of the UNESCO/CIPSH Chair for Global Studies in this institution. Currently coordinates the Doctoral Program in Global Studies in the Aberta University. Member of the Portuguese Academy of History. Holds a PhD in History and Civilizations from the École des Hautes Études en Sciences Sociales of Paris and a PhD in Culture from the University of Aveiro, a Master’s Degree in Modern History from the Faculty of Letters of the University of Lisbon and a Master’s Degree in Sciences of Education from the Faculty of Psychology and Education Sciences of the University of Lisbon.

He has coordinated large-scale research projects such as the Historical Dictionary of Religious Orders and Related Institutions in Portugal, The Complete Works of Father Manuel Antunes in 14 volumes, and the Vatican Secret Archives in 3 volumes. Among his vast bibliography, we can find in-depth studies on Vieira, the Jesuits and the Marquis of Pombal. He directed, together with Pedro Calafate, a great Luso-Brazilian project named “Vieira Global”, which includes the publishing of The Complete Works of Father António Vieira in 30 volumes, preparing the Dictionary of Father António Vieira and publishing a selection of works of this baroque author in 20 languages of great international circulation. He coordinates, together with Carlos Fiolhais, the project Pioneer Works of Portuguese Culture, which is being published by Círculo de Leitores in 30 volumes. Together with Fátima Vieira, he directs the project Global Portugal in a Game of Mirrors (150 mini-books for each country), supported by the Camões Institute. He also coordinates the project “Culture in Negative”, which resulted in the publication of the Dictionary of the Antis and a History of Portuguese Culture in Negative. Like his other projects, the format of this project is already being adapted in other countries.

Besides this, his bibliography includes the following books: O Mito de Portugal, Lisbon, Roma Editora, 2000; O Mito dos Jesuítas em Portugal e no Brasil, Séculos XVI-XX, 2 Vols., Lisbon, Gradiva, 2006-2007; A Europa ao Espelho de Portugal: Ideia (s) de Europa na Cultura Portuguesa, Lisboa, Temas & Debates/Círculo de Leitores, 2020. In 2015, he was awarded the Cultural Merit Medal of the Portuguese State, the most important award attributed by the Portuguese Government, in recognition of the services provided to culture and science.

ORCID: http://orcid.org/0000-0002-5315-1182

== Biography ==
=== Research projects ===
- Author and co-director of the project Dicionário Histórico das Ordens e Instituições Afins em Portugal [Historical Dictionary of Religious Orders and Related Institutions in Portugal], funded by the Foundation for Science and Technology (FCT) (2010).
- Coordinator of the research project entitled “Documentos sobre a História da Expansão Portuguesa existentes no Arquivo Secreto do Vaticano” [Documents of the History of Portuguese Expansion from the Vatican Secret Archives], funded by the Foundation for Science and Technology (FCT) and promoted by the Centre of Studies of Peoples and Cultures of Portuguese Expression – UCP (2011).
- Member of the coordinating committee of the project for the critical edition of Obra Completa do Padre Manuel Antunes, SJ [The Complete Works of Father Manuel Antunes, SJ], published by the Calouste Gulbenkian Foundation (2012).
- Coordinator of the project “Vieira Global” (with Pedro Calafate), which includes The Complete Works of Father António Vieira - published by Círculo de Leitores in 2013-2014 a multimedia Dictionary of Father António Vieira and the edition of the selected works of Vieira, translated in 12 international large-circulation idioms (2012-).
- Coordinator of the Dicionário Enciclopédico da Madeira [Encyclopedic Dictionary of Madeira] (2012-).
- Coordinator of the project for the critical edition of The Complete Works of the Marquis of Pombal (with Pedro Calafate and Viriato Soromenho-Marques) (2013-).
- Coordinator of the project Pioneer Works of Portuguese Culture (with Carlos Fiolhais) (2015-2019).

=== Partial bibliography ===
His published works include:

- Vieira na Literatura Anti-Jesuítica, (co-authorship with Bruno Cardoso Reis), Lisbon, Roma Editora, 1997;
- O Mito do Milénio, (co-authorship with José Manuel Fernandes) Lisbon, Paulinas, 1999;
- Teologia e Utopia em António Vieira, insert of the journal Lusitania Sacra, Lisbon, 1999;
- Brotar Educação, Lisbon, Roma Editora, 1999;
- Falésias da Utopia, Lisbon, Editora Arkê, 2000;
- História dos Dehonianos em Portugal, Oporto, Edições Dehonianas, 2000;
- O Mito de Portugal, Lisbon, Roma Editora, 2000 (Awarded with the First Prize of “Livro 2004” of the Historic Society of the Portuguese Independence);
- Monita Secreta (Instruções Secretas dos Jesuítas). História de um manual conspiracionista, (co-authorship with Christine Vogel) Lisbon, Roma Editora, 2002;
- Fé, Ciência e Cultura. Brotéria – 100 anos, Coordination in partnership with Hermínio Rico, Preface by Eduardo Lourenço, Lisbon, Gradiva, 2003;
- O mito do Marquês de Pombal, (co-authorship with Annabela Rita), Lisbon, Prefácio, 2004;
- Metamorfoses de um povo: Religião e Política nos Regimentos da Inquisição Portuguesa – with complete edition of Regimentos da Inquisição Portuguesa, (co-authorship with Paulo de Assunção), Lisbon, Prefácio, 2004;
- Influência de Joaquim de Flora em Portugal e na Europa. With the edition of Natália Correia's writings about “Utopia da Idade Feminina do Espírito Santo” , (co-authorship with José Augusto Mourão), Lisbon, Roma Editora, 2004;
- Dois exercícios de Ironia: “Contra os Jesuítas” de Sena Freitas and “Defesa da Carta Encíclica de Sua Santidade o Papa Pio IX” de Antero de Quental, (co-authorship with Prof. Luís Machado de Abreu), Lisbon, Prefácio, 2005;
- Coordination of the edition of the unpublished manuscript of the Tratado do Quinto Império em Portugal (Treaty of the Fifth Empire in Portugal). With the complete edition of the Treaty of the Fifth Monarchy by Sebastião de Paiva, Preface by Arnaldo Espírito Santo, Lisbon, Imprensa Nacional – Casa da Moeda, 2006;
- O Mito dos Jesuítas em Portugal e no Brasil, Séculos XVI-XX, 2 Vols., Lisbon, Gradiva, 2006–2007;
- Padre Manuel Antunes (1918–1985): Interfaces da Cultura Portuguesa e Europeia, Work coordinated in partnership with Hermínio Rico, Oporto, Campo das Letras, 2007;
- Jesuítas e Inquisição: cumplicidades de confrontações, Rio de Janeiro, Editora da Universidade Estadual do Rio de Janeiro, 2007;
- O Padre António Vieira e as Mulheres: Uma visão barroca do Universo feminino, (co-authorship with Isabel Morán Cabanas), Oporto, Campo das Letras, 2008;
- Padre António Vieira (1608–1697): Imperador da Língua Portuguesa, Coordination and co-authorship, Lisbon, Correio da Manhã, 2008;
- Jardins do Mundo: Discursos e Práticas, Co-coordination with Cristina da Costa Gomes, Lisbon, Gradiva, 2008;
- Madeira - mito da ilha-jardim: cultura da regionalidade ou da nacionalidade imperfeita na Madeira, Lisbon, Gradiva, 2009;
- Holodomor – The Unknown Ukrainian Tragedy (1932-1933), Author and co-director, Coimbra, Grácio Editor, 2013;
- Jesuítas, Construtores da Globalização, Co-authored with Carlos Fiolhais, CTT, 2016;
- Portugal Católico, Lisbon, Temas e Debates, 2017.
- Dicionário dos Antis: Cultura Portuguesa em Negativo, Lisbon, INCM, 2018;
- Madeira Global: Grande Dicionário Enciclopédico da Madeira - Volume 1, coordinated with Cristina Trindade, Lisbon, Theya, 2019;
- A Europa ao Espelho de Portugal, Lisbon, Temas e Debates, 2020
- História Global de Portugal, co-authored with José Pedro Paiva and Carlos Fiolhais, Lisbon, Temas e Debates, 2020
