= António Vieira =

17th-century Portuguese diplomat and missionary

The Reverend António Vieira SJ
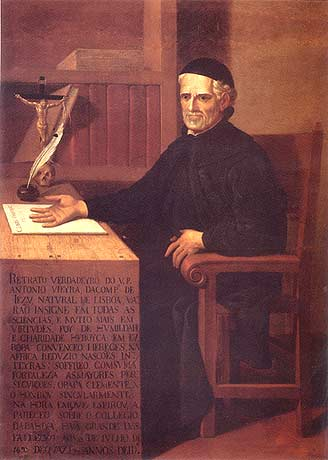
- Vieira, c. early 18th century

Personal life
- Born: 6 February 1608 Lisbon, Kingdom of Portugal
- Died: 18 July 1697 (aged 89) Bahia, Portuguese Colony of Brazil
- Known for: Diplomacy as member of the Royal Council to King John IV
- Occupation: Diplomat, Philosopher, Jesuit Priest, Orator and Writer

António Vieira (Note: European Portuguese pronunciation: [ɐ̃ˈtɔni.u viˈɐjɾɐ, ɐ̃ˈtɔnju -]; contemporaneously also rendered as Vieyra; the modern Brazilian Portuguese spelling is Antônio Vieira, pronounced [ɐ̃ˈtoni.u viˈejɾɐ, ɐ̃ˈtonju -].) SJ (6 February 1608 – 18 July 1697) was a Portuguese Jesuit priest, diplomat, orator, preacher, philosopher, writer, and member of the Royal Council to the King of Portugal.

== Biography ==
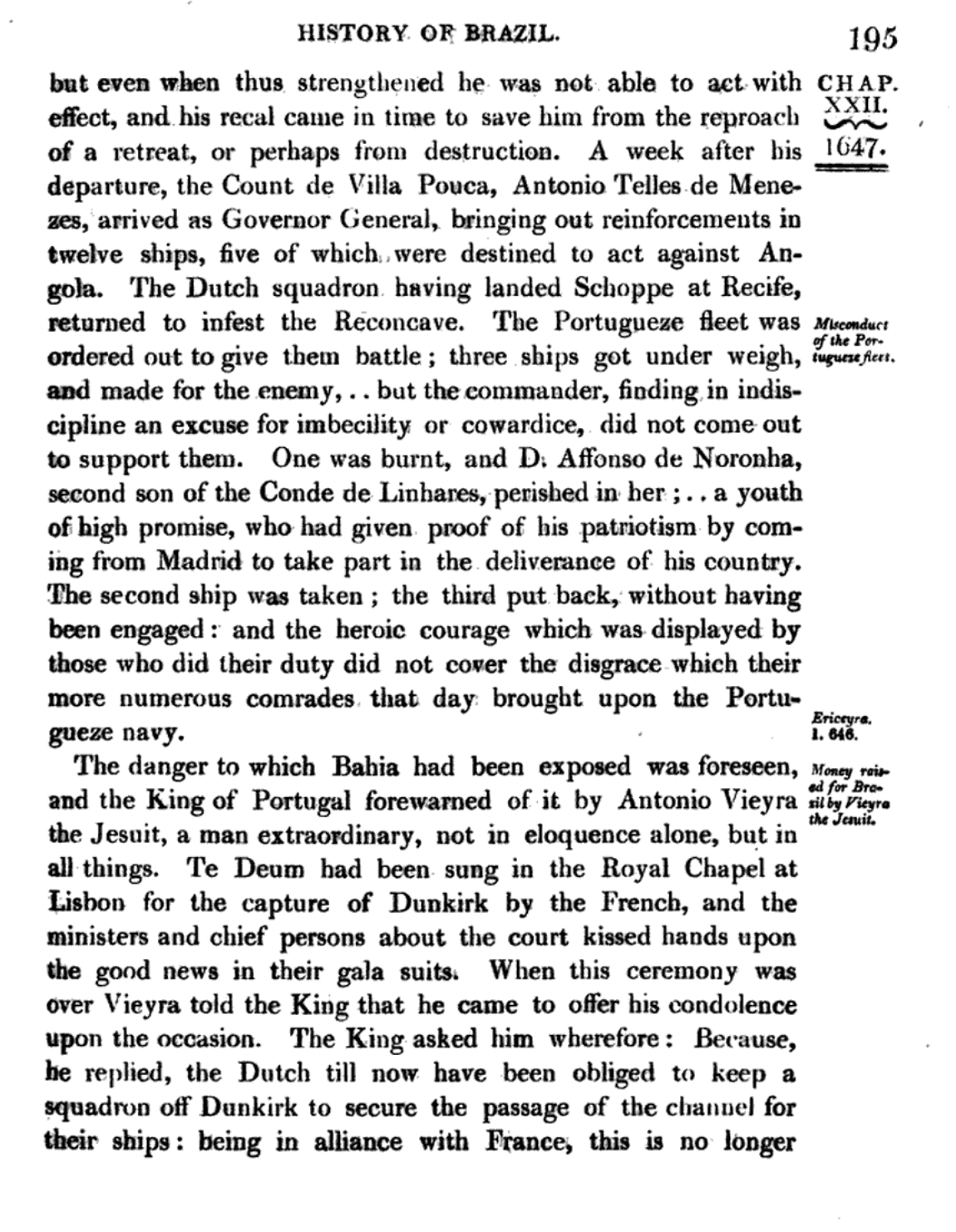
In the book 'History of Brazil, Volume 2 – 1817' By Robert Southey, Antonio Vieira advised the King of Portugal and later became a member of the Royal Council.

Padre António Vieira was born in Lisbon to Cristóvão Vieira Ravasco, the son of a mulatto woman, Maria de Azevedo. In 1614 he accompanied his parents to the colony of Brazil, where his father had been posted as a registrar. He received his education at the Jesuit college at Bahia. He entered the Jesuit novitiate in 1625, under Father Fernão Cardim, and two years later pronounced his first vows. At the age of eighteen he was teaching rhetoric, and a little later dogmatic theology, at the college of Olinda, besides writing the "annual letters" of the province.

In 1635 he was ordained to the priesthood. He soon began to distinguish himself as an orator, and the three patriotic sermons he delivered at Bahia (1638–40) are remarkable for their imaginative power and dignity of language. The Sermon for the Good Success of the Arms of Portugal Against Those of Holland was considered by the Abbé Raynal to be "perhaps the most extraordinary discourse ever heard from a Christian pulpit.

Fr. António Vieira, preaching

When the revolution of 1640 placed John IV on the throne of Portugal, Brazil gave him her allegiance, and Vieira was chosen to accompany the viceroy's son to Lisbon to congratulate the new king. His talents and aptitude for affairs impressed John IV so favorably that he appointed him tutor to the Infante Dom Pedro, royal preacher, and a member of the Royal Council.

Vieira did efficient work in the War and Navy Departments, revived commerce, urged the foundation of a national bank and the organization of the Brazilian Trade Company.

Vieira used the pulpit to propound measures for improving the general and particularly the economic condition of Portugal. His pen was as busy as his voice, and in four notable pamphlets he advocated the creation of companies of commerce, denounced as unchristian a society which discriminated against New Christians (Muslim and Jewish converts), called for the reform of the procedure of the Inquisition and the admission of Jewish and foreign traders, with guarantees for their security from religious persecution. He argued to the king that Jewish merchants would benefit the kingdom, remedying its current "miserable state."

He did not spare his own estate, for in his Sexagesimalsermon he boldly attacked the current style of preaching, its subtleties, affectation, obscurity and abuse of metaphor, and declared the ideal of a sermon to be one which sent men away " not contented with the preacher, but discontented with themselves."

In 1647 Vieira began his career as a diplomat, in the course of which he visited England, France, the Netherlands and Italy. In his Papel Forte he urged the cession of Pernambuco to the Dutch as the price of peace, while his mission to Rome in 1650 was undertaken in the hope of arranging a marriage between the heir to the throne of Portugal and the only daughter of King Philip IV of Spain. His success, freedom of speech and reforming zeal had made him enemies on all sides, and only the intervention of the king prevented his expulsion from the Society of Jesus, so that prudence counselled his return to Brazil.

In his youth he had vowed to consecrate his life to the conversion of the African slaves and native Indians of his adopted country, and arriving in Maranhão early in 1653 he recommenced his apostolic labors, which had been interrupted during his stay of fourteen years in the Old World. Starting from Pará, he penetrated to the banks of the Tocantins, making numerous converts to Christianity and European civilization among the most violent tribes; but after two years of unceasing labour, during which every difficulty was placed in his way by the colonial authorities, he saw that the Indians must be withdrawn from the jurisdiction of the governors, to prevent their exploitation, and placed under the control of the members of a single religious society.

Accordingly, in June 1654 he set sail for Lisbon to plead the cause of the Indians, and in April 1655 he obtained from the king a series of decrees which placed the missions under the Society of Jesus, with himself as their superior, and prohibited the enslavement of the natives, except in certain specified cases. Returning with this charter of freedom, he organized the missions over a territory having a coast-line of 400 leagues, and a population of 200,000 souls, and in the next six years (1655–61) the indefatigable missionary set the crown on his work. In August 1659, he signed the Treaty of the Mapuá with various indigenous groups on the Marajó Archipelago. After a time, however, the colonists, attributing the shortage of slaves and the consequent diminution in their profits to the Jesuits, began actively to oppose Vieira, and they were joined by members of the secular clergy and the other Orders who were jealous of the monopoly enjoyed by the company in the government of the Indians.

Vieira was accused of want of patriotism and usurpation of jurisdiction, and in 1661, after a popular revolt, the authorities sent him with thirty-one other Jesuit missionaries back to Portugal. He found his friend King John IV dead and the court a prey to faction, but, dauntless as ever in the pursuit of his ambition, he resorted to his favorite arm of preaching, and on Epiphany Day, 1662, in the royal chapel, he replied to his persecutors in a famous rhetorical effort, and called for the execution of the royal decrees in favor of the Indians.

Circumstances were against him, however, and the Count of Castelo Melhor, fearing his influence at court, had him exiled first to Porto and then to Coimbra; but in both these places he continued his work of preaching, and the reform of the Inquisition also occupied his attention. To silence him his enemies then denounced him to that tribunal, and he was cited to appear before the Holy Office at Coimbra to answer points smacking of heresy in his sermons, conversations and writings. He had believed in the prophecies of a 16th-century shoemaker poet, Bandarra, dealing with the coming of a ruler who would inaugurate an epoch of unparalleled prosperity for the church and for Portugal, these new prosperous times were to be called the Quinto Império or "Fifth Empire" (also called "Sebastianism"). In Vieira's famous opus, Clavis Prophetarum, he had endeavoured to prove the truth of his dreams from passages of Scripture. As he refused to submit, the Inquisitors kept him in prison in Coimbra from October 1665 to December 1667, and finally imposed a sentence which prohibited him from teaching, writing or preaching.

It was a heavy blow for the Jesuits, even though Vieira recovered his freedom and much of his prestige shortly afterwards on the accession of King Pedro II. For example, it is known that in 1669, in Lisbon, Cosimo III de Médici had the opportunity to talk several times with Antònio Vieira and to attend his famous masses. However, it was soon determined that he should go to Rome to procure revision of the sentence, which still hung over him though the penalties had been removed. During a six years' residence in the Eternal City, Vieira won his greatest triumphs. Pope Clement X invited him to preach before the College of Cardinals, and he became confessor to Queen Christina of Sweden and a member of her literary academy.

At the request of the pope he drew up a report of two hundred pages on the Inquisition in Portugal, with the result that after a judicial inquiry Pope Innocent XI suspended it in Portugal for seven years (1674–81). Ultimately, Vieira returned to Portugal with a papal bull exempting him from the jurisdiction of the grand inquisitor, and in January 1681 he embarked for Brazil. He resided in Bahia and occupied himself in revising his sermons for publication, and in 1687 he became superior of the province. A false accusation of complicity in an assassination, and the intrigues of members of his own Company, clouded his last months, and on 18 July 1697 he died in Salvador, Bahia.

== Legacy ==
António Vieira is considered one of the literary greats of the Portuguese-speaking world. The Padre António Vieira Chair in Portuguese Studies, at the Pontifícia Universidade Católica-Rio de Janeiro was created on 7 October 1994, to train teachers and researchers in the social sciences. Promoting academic exchanges between Brazil and Portugal, the Chair's main aim has been to deepen the cultural dialog that already exists between the two countries within the university context. The Chair is involved in the training of teachers in the areas of Portuguese Literature and Culture, Portuguese Language, and Lusophone Literatures.

In 1997 Portugal issued a commemorative coin to mark the 300th anniversary of the death of Father Vieira.

Portugal issued a stamp in 2008, celebrating the 400th anniversary of Vieira's birth (1608). Brasil has issued already two Vieira stamps, in 1941 and 1997.

A statue of Father António Vieira by the sculptor Marco Fidalgo, was unveiled on the Largo Trindade Coelho near the church of São Roque in 2017, on the initiative of the Holy House of Mercy of Lisbon, Portugal.

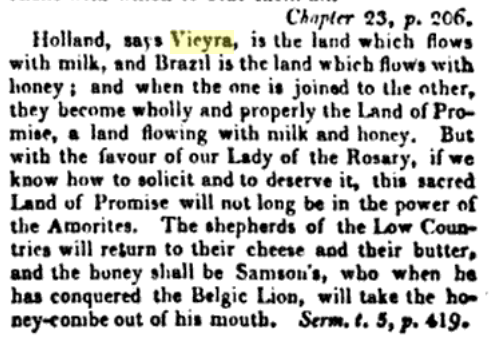
In the book 'History of Brazil, Volume 2 – 1817' By Robert Southey, Antonio Vieira compares Holland and Brazil to Milk and Honey.

== Works ==
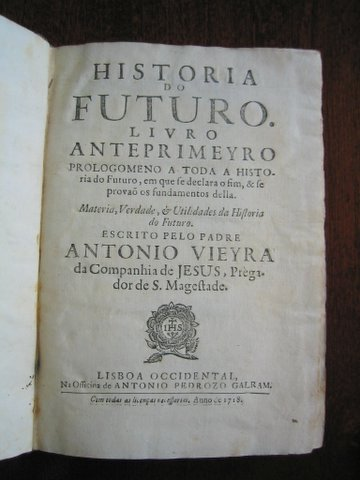
The first page of "Historia do Futuro", first edition

His works form perhaps the greatest monument of Portuguese prose. Two hundred discourses exist to prove his fecundity, while his versatility is shown by the fact that he could treat the same subject differently on half a dozen occasions. His letters, simple and conversational in style, have a deep historical and political interest, and form documents of the first value for the history of the period.

His principal works are:

- Sermões (Sermons) (15 vols., Lisbon, 1679–1748); there are many subsequent editions, but none complete; translations exist in Spanish, Italian, German and French, which have gone through several editions Archive
- História do Futuro (History of the Future) (Lisbon, 1718; 2nd ed., ibid., 1755); this and the Quinto Império and this Clavis Prophetarum seem to be in essence one and the same book in different redactions
- Cartas (Letters) (3 vols., Lisbon, 1735–46)
- Notícias recônditas do modo de proceder a Inquisição de Portugal com os seus presos (News on how the Portuguese Inquisition proceeds with its prisoners) (Lisbon, 1821)
- Arte de Furtar (The Art of Stealing) published under Vieira's name in many editions; is now known not to be a work by him

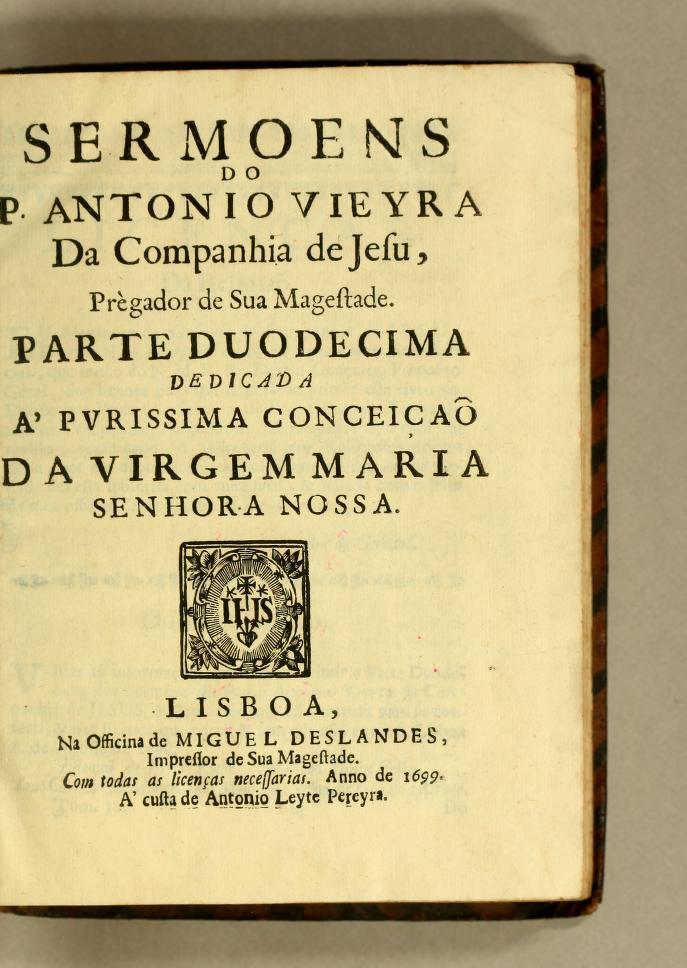
Sermoens do P. Antonio Vieyra da Companhia de Jesu, prègador de Sua Magestade, Septima Parte

A badly edited edition of the works of Vieira in 27 volumes appeared in Lisbon, 1854–58. There are unpublished manuscripts of his in the British Museum in London, and in the Bibliothèque Nationale in Paris. A bibliography of Vieira will be found in Sommervogel, Bibliothèque de la compagnie de Jesus, viii. 653–85.

The Complete Works of Father António Vieira, annotated and updated, began publication in 2013, nearly four centuries after his birth. The 30 volumes of this publication comprise his complete letters, sermons, prophetic works, political writings, writings on Jews and Indians, as well as his poetry and theatrical works; it is the first complete and carefully edited publication of all of Vieira's many writings. One of the largest editorial projects of its kind, it was the result of international cooperation among various Luso-Brazilian research institutions and scientific, cultural and literary academies, under the aegis of the Rectory of the University of Lisbon. More than 20 thousand folios of manuscripts and printed pages attributed to Vieira were analyzed and compared, in dozens of libraries and archives in Portugal, Brazil, Spain, France, Italy, England, Holland, Mexico and in the United States of America. About one quarter of The Complete Works are made of previously undiscovered and unreleased texts. The project, directed by José Eduardo Franco and Pedro Calafate, was developed by CLEPUL in partnership with Santa Casa da Misericórdia, and published by Círculo de Leitores, with the final volume to be released in 2014. Although this is a Portuguese edition, a selection of his works will be made available in 12 languages as part of the project.

== Quotations ==
"We are what we do. What we don't do, doesn't exist. Therefore, we only exist on days when we do. On the days when we don't do, we simply endure".

"The end for which men invented books was to preserve the memory of past things against the tyranny of time and against the forgetfulness of man, which is an even greater tyranny."

"Holland, is the land which flows with milk, and Brazil is the land which flows with honey; and when the one is joined to the other, they become wholly and properly the Land of Promise, a land flowing with milk and honey."

== See also ==
- Sermon of Saint Anthony to the Fish

== Publications ==
- Robert Southey, History of Brazil (Volume Two, London, 1817)
- Luiz Cabral, Vieira, biographie, caractère, éloquence, (Paris, 1900)
- Luiz Cabral, Vieira pregador (two volumes, Porto, 1901)
