= Fifth Empire =

Concept of a global Portuguese empire

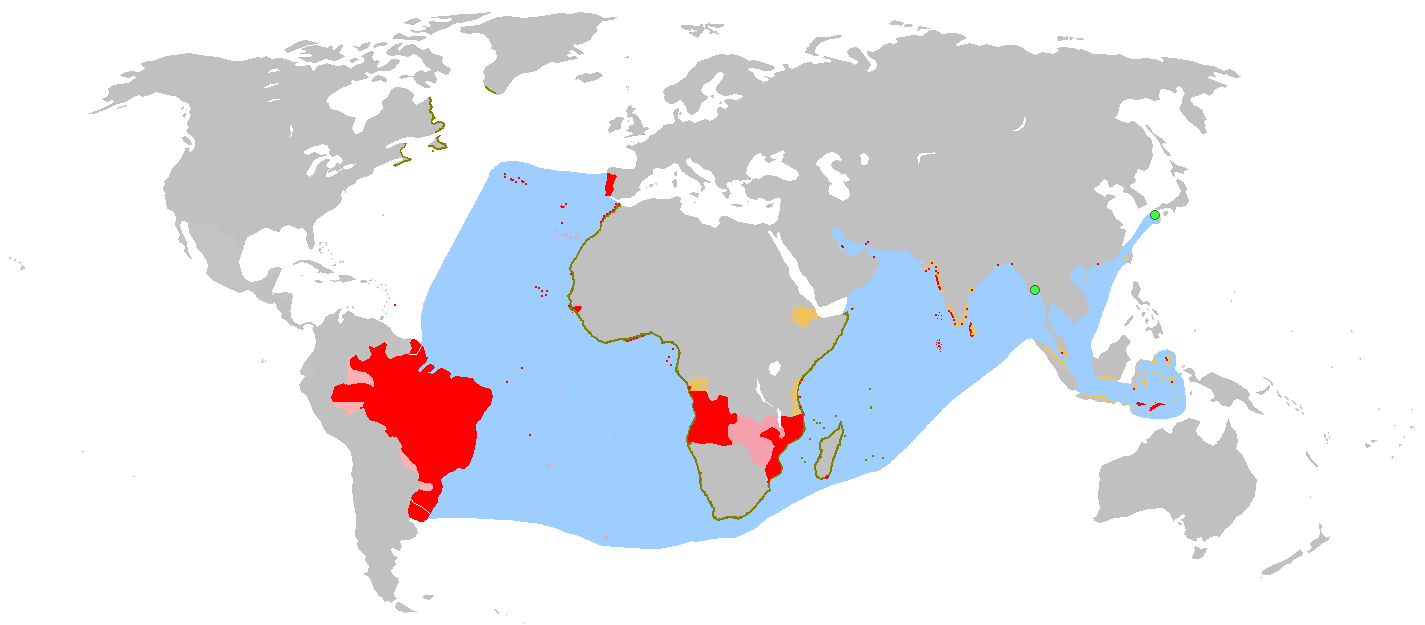
The Portuguese Empire and its interests

The Fifth Empire (Portuguese: Quinto Império) is an esoteric concept of a global Portuguese empire with spiritual and temporal power, based on an interpretation of Daniel 2 and the Book of Revelation, whose origins lay with António Vieira. The concept was re-popularized in the twentieth century with the publication of Mensagem by Fernando Pessoa in 1934.

== The concept ==
The Fifth Empire is not a mere territorial empire. It is a spiritual and linguistic body which spreads throughout the entire world. It represents the ultimate form of fusion between material (science, reason, intellectual speculation) and spiritual knowledge: the occult, mystical speculation and Kabbalism. It is the pinnacle of all the work undertaken by the previous empires (according to old principle of the translatio imperii), which are the following under Pessoa's point of view:

- First Empire - Ancient Greece, all knowledge and experience extracted from the ancient empires;
- Second Empire - Roman Empire, expansion of the First Empire's culture and knowledge;
- Third Empire - Christianity, fusion between the First and the Second Empires, with the absorption of several eastern elements (such as Judaism) - the Christian Moral;
- Fourth Empire - Europe, spreading throughout the entire world the outcome of the previous empires and the British hegemony, its culture and the English-speaking world as a result of the British Empire - the English individualism.

The Fifth Empire, led by "the hidden one" (O Encoberto in the poem, an allusion to Sebastianism), will unite the entire world spiritually and culturally, led by the Portuguese Nation.

== Origins ==
The Fifth Empire is a messianic, millenarian (quiliástica) belief, designed by Father António Vieira in the seventeenth century.

The first four empires were, according to Vieira, in order: the Assyro-Chaldeans, the Persians, the Greeks and the Romans. The fifth was the Portuguese Empire.

As seen when viewing the book of Daniel 2, in the Hebrew scriptures (Old Testament), in Bible, Father António Vieira came to this myth based on a biblical passage that tells the story of King Nebuchadnezzar and his dream, with a statue that featured five kinds of materials.

The origins of the myth of the Fifth Empire are intimately connected with the history of Portugal. The death of King Sebastian and subsequent loss of independence were disastrous for the country and its colonial ambitions. The restoration of independence in 1640 did, however, give a new hope for the entire nation. Father António Vieira, in many of his works and sermons, would present John IV as the saviour, who would restore the grandiosity of the Portuguese Empire, leader of the Age of Discovery, and succeed to the four empires of ancient History (Vieira's past empires did not coincide with those advocated by Pessoa and mentioned above). As for the Fifth Monarchists later in England and other authors, although with some differences, Vieira, with an elaborate exegesis based on his vast knowledge of the Bible, believed that the timing was significant because the calendar year 1666 was approaching. The number 666 had been identified in the Book of Revelation with the ultimate human despot to rule the world, but who would be replaced by the second coming of the Messiah; this added to his belief that the Fifth Monarchy was possibly about to begin.

Gonçalo Anes Bandarra, the 16th century shoemaker turned prophet whom interpreters credit with foretelling accurately the coming of a period of 60 years when Portugal was under Spanish rule, the subsequent 1640 revolution and liberation under king John IV (after thirty scissors) and the reigns of Afonso VI, Peter II and John V, was an inspired prophet to António Vieira and the Sebastianists of his time. His work also aroused interest especially among the new Christians. Bandarra had a vast knowledge from the Old Testament and his prophetic Trovas would also be subject to analysis and inspiration for Fernando Pessoa. In his poem "Mensagem", a book so thoroughly steeped in Templar and Rosicrucian symbolism in his own words, Pessoa reveals himself as the author of the third and final warning, which complements the two previous ones, of Bandarra and Vieira.

From the 17th century on, and as the Portuguese Empire slowly crumbled, the dream became increasingly more mystical. Greater importance was given to Luís de Camões and his masterpiece, Os Lusíadas, which exalted Portugal as a nation of heroes aided by the classical gods.

== Pessoa ==
The third cycle of "Mensagem", called O Encoberto ("The Hidden One") refers to Fernando Pessoa's vision of a future world of peace and understanding, the Fifth Empire, which will come about through a Portuguese of mystical origin to which he refers by a number of names including "The Hidden One", "The King" or "King Sebastian". The Hidden One represents the fulfillment of the destiny of mankind, designed by God since before Time, and, at the same time, the accomplishment of Portugal which, in Pessoa's vision is the chosen nation, the one that will bear the New Messiah and lead the way towards the Fifth Empire:

There will be a meeting of the two long separated forces, but long approaching: the left side of wisdom – i.e. science, reasoning, intellectual speculation, and the right side of wisdom – that is, the hidden knowledge, intuition, the kabbalistic and mystical speculation. The alliance of D. Sebastian, Emperor of the World, and the Angelic Pope, figure this close alliance, this fusion of the material and the spiritual, perhaps without separation. And the very Second Advent, or even the new incarnation of the same Adept, whom once God has designed His symbol, or Son, seems to show otherwise this same supreme alliance.

According to Pessoa "The Fifth Empire. Portugal's future – which I do not reckon, but I know – it is already written, for those who know how to read it, in the Bandarra's Trovas, and also in quatrains of Nostradamus". In The Prophecies of Nostradamus, Fernando Pessoa probably makes reference to the Tenth and last Century, including the Fifth quatrain and the last of all quatrains of this century, among many others in Nostradamus's Centuries.

In Pessoa's vision, lusophone countries such as Brazil have a key role in this mission, supported by the Portuguese international alliances, including the Iberian nations, Britain, Ireland, the Atlantism, Greece and its legacy, and beyond.

== See also ==
- Cult of the Holy Spirit
- Fifth Monarchists
- Lusotropicalism
- Third Rome
- Fourth Reich
