= List of magazines in Portugal =

Magazines in Portugal are mostly women's magazines, society magazines and TV magazines. In 1994 there were nearly 984 magazines in the country.

The following is an incomplete list of current and defunct magazines published in Portugal. They may be published in Portuguese or in other languages.

== A ==
- Activa
- Alma feminina
- Amanhã
- Árvore
- Atlantida
- Azulejos

== B ==
- Blitz

== C ==
- Caras
- Centauro
- Colóquio
- Contemporânea
- Contestável

== E ==
- Essential Lisboa
- Essential Madeira
- Exame
- Exame Informática

== F ==
- As Farpas
- Flama
- Focus
- Fortuna

== G ==
- Grande Reportagem

== L ==
- A Leitura

== M ==
- Mais Alto
- Maria
- Maxima
- Media XXI
- Mística
- Mundo Literário

== N ==
- Nova Gente

== P ==
- PCGuia
- Portugal Colonial
- Portugal Socialista
- Presença

== R ==
- Revista ACP
- Roda dos Milhoes

== S ==
- Sábado
- Saber Viver
- Sudoeste

== T ==
- Teleculinária
- Telenovelas
- TV Guia

== V ==
- Variante
- Visão
- Vogue Portugal

== See also ==
- List of newspapers in Portugal
- Mass media in Portugal
