= Variante (review) =

- Staff writers: Henrique Galvão
- Categories: Review
- Founded: Spring 1942
- Final issue: Winter 1943
- Country: Portugal, Portuguese Empire
- Based in: Lisbon
- Language: Portuguese

Variante (Portuguese for "variant" and "difference") was a Portuguese review published in the capital Lisbon from 1942 to 1943.

== History and profile ==
The review was published by Editorial Inquérito (Editorial Survey), directed and edited by António Pedro, it produced two issues of the review: Spring 1942 and Winter 1943. The eclectic spirit but pointedly poetic (if not surrealist), the review articulated with the editor's work, announced its first issue under the sign of a Nonconformist (Inconformismo), Fantasy (Fantasia), the second Bad Taste (Mau gosto), he third was Strength and Form (Força and Forma) and the fourth was Love (Amor) (this was the last that were publisher).

The arranged writings of António Pedro returned its modern quality of publications with Contemporânea review by José Pacheko (or Pacheco). Notable writers who worked with the review included Vitorino Nemésio, Adolfo Casais Monteiro, Diogo de Macedo, Sofia de Melo Breyner, José Régio, Manuel Mendes Delfim Santos and a couple of more. It was prematurely interrupted (for economic reasons and lack of cooperation of the elevation of the desired program), the publication was resumed in 1948 under the "International Surrealist Review", then directed by António Pedro, André Breton, V. Brauner, N, Celas and E.L.T. Mesens difficulties of the editorial order prevented the concretization of this project.
