= Adolfo Casais Monteiro =

Portuguese essayist, poet and writer

- Photograph by Fernando Lemos, 1949
- Born: 4 July 1908; Porto, Portugal
- Died: 23 July 1972 (aged 64); São Paulo, Brazil
- Occupations: Essayist, poet and writer

Adolfo Victor Casais Monteiro (4 July 1908 – 23 July 1972) was a Portuguese essayist, poet, and writer.

== Biography ==
Casais Monteiro was born on 4 July 1908 in Porto. He graduated in History and Philosophy at University of Porto (Faculty of Arts), where he was colleague of Agostinho da Silva and Delfim Santos, in 1933. In Porto he started as a high school teacher at Liceu Rodrigues de Freitas, until he was prevented from teaching by the government dictatorship in 1937. He would eventually go into exile in Brazil in 1954 for the same reasons.

After the removal of Miguel Torga, Branquinho da Fonseca and Edmundo de Bettencourt, in 1930, Adolfo Casais Monteiro was director of the Coimbra's literary journal Presença (journal), with José Régio and João Gaspar Simões. This journal published the political views of Casais Monteiro until it ceased publication in 1940. He was arrested several times due to his political opinions adverse to the Estado Novo regime and directed anonymously the weekly Mundo Literário in 1936 e 1937.

Prevented from teaching, Casais Monteiro goes to Lisbon, living as literary author, translator and editor. As Agostinho da Silva or Jorge de Sena, he would eventually leave to Brazil, due to his opposition to Estado Novo, which he could not accept. He also directed the journal Princípio (1930) and collaborated with the journals Sudoeste (1935) and Variante (1942–1943).

Having participated in the celebrations of the 4th centenary of the city of São Paulo in 1954, Adolfo Casais Monteiro fixed residence in Brazil, teaching since then Portuguese Literature in several Brazilian universities, namely at Bahia State University in Salvador, till fixed in 1962 at São Paulo State University (UNESP), Campus de Araraquara-SP. He wrote by then several essays and wrote as literary critic for several Brazilian newspapers, having contributed to the study of Fernando Pessoa and the Movimento da Presença. He died on 23 July 1972 in São Paulo.

Among his translation works is Germania, de Tacitus, published in 1941. His only novel, Adolescentes (Teenagers), was published in 1945.

His poetic work, which began in 1929 with "Confusão", was influenced by the first Portuguese modernism, approaching stylistically the aestheticism of André Gide. Their criticisms of concreteness were based on the idea that this aesthetic movement promoted impersonality, starting from the "'purest abstractions to build a new language to the service of nothing, a pure language, an invention of objects – in short: a beautiful toy". "While some authors describe it as independent of Surrealism others emphasize the influence that this had on the author's current aesthetic, as can be seen in his essays on authors such as Jules Supervielle, Henri Michaux and Antonin Artaud (designating the latter as unsustainable presence ). Much of his poetry is dedicated to the specific historical period in which he lived, as in the poem "Europa" (1945), which was read by his friend and colleague António Pedro in Literary World at the microphones of London BBC.

Married Mary Alice Pereira Gomes, also a writer and sister of Soeiro Pereira Gomes, with whom he had a son.

== Works ==
=== Poetry ===
- Confusão – 1929
- Correspondência de Família (with Ribeiro Couto) – 1933
- Poemas do Tempo Incerto – 1934
- Sempre e Sem Fim – 1937
- Versos (comprises the 3 previous books) – 1944
- Canto da Nossa Agonia – 1942
- Noite Aberta aos Quatro Ventos – 1943
- Europa – 1946
- Simples Canções da Terra – 1949
- Voo sem Pássaro Dentro – 1954
- Poesias Escolhidas – 1960
- Poesias Completas – 1969

=== Novel ===
- Adolescentes - 1945

=== Translation ===
- A Educação Sentimental – Gustave Flaubert – reedited by Editora Nova Alexandria, 2009.

=== Essay ===
- Considerações Pessoais – 1935
- A Poesia de Ribeiro Couto – 1935
- A Poesia de Jules Supervielle – 1938
- Sobre o Romance Contemporâneo – 1940
- De Pés Fincados na Terra – 1941
- Manuel Bandeira – 1944
- O Romance e os seus Problemas – 1950
- Fernando Pessoa e a Crítica – 1952
- Fernando Pessoa, o Insincero Verídico – 1954
- Problemas da Crítica de Arte (A Crítica e a Arte Moderna) – 1956
- Estudos sobre a Poesia de Fernando Pessoa – 1958
- A Poesia da Presença (with un anthology) – 1959
- Clareza e Mistério da Crítica – 1961
- O Romance (Teoria e Crítica) – 1964
- A Palavra Essential – 1965
- A Literatura Popular em Verso no Brasil – 1965
- Estrutura e Autenticidade como Problemas da Teoria e da Crítica Literárias – 1968
- O País do Absurdo – 1974
- O que foi e o que não foi o Movimento da «Presença» – 1995
- Melancolia do Progresso – 2003

=== Epistolography ===
- Cartas Inéditas de António Nobre (Introduction and notes from ACM) – 1933
- Cartas em Família – 2008
- Cartas a Sua Mãe – 2008
