= Sudoeste (review) =

- Staff writers: Almada Negreiros
- Categories: Review
- Format: 25 cm
- Founded: June 1935
- Final issue: November 1935
- Country: Portugal
- Based in: Lisbon
- Language: Portuguese

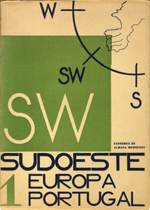
First edition, June 1935.

Sudoeste: cadernos de Almada Negreiros (Portuguese for "Southwest") was a Portuguese review published in Lisbon in 1935. The magazine was an attempt to continue the Orpheu movement. It was headed by Almada Negreiros (as suggested in the magazine's title), in collaboration with Dário Martins, which put their knowledge in different forms of direct interventionism, contacts and its influences to the publication of the periodical.

Three issues were published between June and November 1935. The first issue reflected through its essays and text that forms the same theoretical presupposition: Life understood with a constructive union between the whole individuals. It also exacerbates having a value in creativity with an indispensable likeliness in all of the areas including arts and politics, condemning in a less objective form, which had mixed up the elements which annulled the potentials. Its third issue was relatively the first that it adopted the contributors from the reviews Presença, the former Orpheu, notably by the writers including the great Fernando Pessoa, Mário de Sá-Carneiro, Luís de Montalvor, Raul Leal, Alfredo Guisado, Alvaro de Campos, João Gaspar Simões, José Régio Adolfo Casais Monteiro, Saul Dias, Carlos Queirós, Carlos Ramos, Pardal Monteiro and Mário Saa, along with its illustrations by Sara Afonso and Mário Eloy. It never published the fourth issue.
