= Presença =

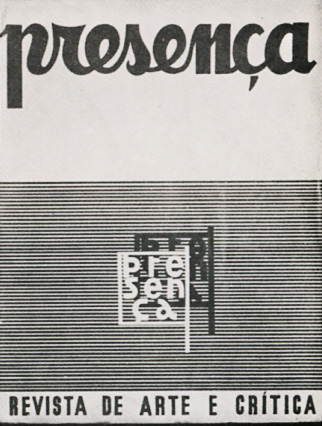
- Cover of an issue of Presença
- Format: Magazine
- Founder: João Gaspar Somões; Branquinho da Fonseca
- Founded: 1927
- First issue: 10 March 1927
- Final issue: 1940
- Country: Portugal
- Language: Portuguese

Presença - Folha de Arte e Crítica (lit. "Presence: A Journal of Art and Critique") was a Portuguese magazine published in Coimbra from 10 March 1927 until 1940, producing a total of 54 issues during its existence.

== History ==
Presença was an influential magazine. João Gaspar Somões and Branquinho da Fonseca founded the magazine in 1927 and were its primary directors alongside José Régio. Branquinho da Fonseca left the magazine after the 27th issue in 1930 due to concerns about creative freedom, which was seen as a reaction to Régio's increasing involvement with the publication.

Starting with the 27th edition, which was published in 1930, the magazine's leadership was split three ways with the addition of Adolfo Casais Monteiro in 1938. The following year, the magazine's format was revised and expanded to contain more pages. The magazine briefly had an additional editor, secretary Alberto de Serpa and published two more volumes, November 1939 and February 1940. Presença was ultimately dissolved due to ideological struggles between Simões and Monteiro.

Writers who were published in Presença included Adolfo Correia Rocha (later known by the pseudonym Miguel Torga), Aquilino Ribeiro, Edmundo de Bettencourt, Carlos Queiroz, Júlio/Saul Dias and an entire generation of poets, prosers, pensioners and plastic artists, who would become known as “the Presença generation” or “precencistas”. While its emphasis on art was secondary, Presença published essays about art by Diogo de Macedo, José Régio, and the magazine argued in support of the First Independent Salon in 1930. Numerous artists contributed to the magazine, including Almada Negreiros, Júlio Diogo de Macedo, Dordio Gomes, Sarah Afonso, Arlindo Vicente, Bernardo Marques, Mário Eloy, João Carlos, Paulo Ferreira, Ventura Porfírio, Arpaz Szenes and Maria Helena Vieira da Silva (in 1940).

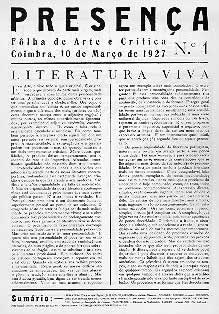
First issue of the magazine Presença - Folha de Arte e Crítica, Coimbra, 10 March 1927

== Editorial line ==
Presença defended the creation of a freer and more lively style of literature, opposing academism and routine journalism. It prioritized critique, prizing the individual over the collective, inner psychology over the social aspect, and intuition over reason. Presenting artists from the magazine Orpheu as “masters” (many of whom also contributed to Presença), Presença was critical in developing a second phase of Modernism, which was to be more critical and theoretical than its predecessor. This critical spirit came from the magazine's founders and from Albano Nogueira and Guilherme de Castilho, who were significant contributors to the magazine's doctrine, alongside José Bacelar, José Marinho, Delfim Santos, Saul Dias, Fausto José, Francisco Bugalho, Alberto de Serpa, Luís de Montalvor Mário Saa, Raul Leal and Antonio Botto.

The magazine published authors associated with Modernism, such as Fernando Pessoa, Mário de Sá-Carneiro, Almada Negreiros and Afonso Duarte, António de Sousa, Irena Lisboa, Vitorino Nemésio, Pedro Homem de Mello, Tomás de Figueiredo and Olavo de Eça Leal. These writers primarily contributed poetry (marked by a certain “provençal lyricism”), and were brought to the magazine by António de Navarro, who had been the director of Orpheu.

The poetry featured “presentists,” and was based on the text of the compositions of the Song of Coimbra and fado sung by Amália Rodrigues.

The magazine also republished the main works of European writers of the early 20th century including Marcel Proust, André Gide, Paul Valéry, Guillaume Apollinaire and Pirandello.

The magazine promoted literary exchange with Brazilian writers and poets, outside of its official initiatives.
