= Mundo Literário =

- Staff writers: Jaime Cortesão Casimiro
- Categories: Weekly magazine
- Founded: 1946
- Final issue: 1948
- Country: Portugal
- Based in: Lisbon
- Language: Portuguese

Mundo literário: semanário de crítica e informação literária, científica e artística (Portuguese for "World Literature: Literary, Scientific and Artistic Criticism and News Weekly") was a Portuguese review published in Lisbon from 1946 to 1948.

The seminary's weekly director-general was Jaime Cortesão Casimiro and its literary head was Adolfo Casais Monteiro, they formed a directive body to the journal, Emil Andersen and Luís de Sousa Rebelo. Its creation occurs of a context of lack of freedom of the press, being in the sights of censorship. 53 issues were made.

== Writers ==
Writers included:

- Eugénio de Andrade
- Matilde Rosa Araújo
- Vitorino Magalhães Godinho
- Alexandre O'Neill
- Alves Redol
- José Régio
- Jorge de Sena
- Fernando Namora
- Mário Sacramento
- António Branquinho da Fonseca
- Aguinaldo Brito Fonseca
- Diogo de Macedo
- Murilo Mendes
- Carlos Drummond de Andrade
- António Sérgio
- Manuela Porto
- António Pedro
- Júlio Pomar
- Abel Manta
- Rómulo de Carvalho
- Mário Dionísio
- Sebastião da Gama
