= Vera Lagoa =

Portuguese journalist

- Born: Maria Armanda Pires Falcão; December 25, 1917; Island of Mozambique
- Died: August 19, 1996 (aged 78); Lisbon, Portugal
- Occupation: Journalist
- Spouse: Francisco António de Gusmão Fiúza José Manuel Tengarrinha José Rebordão Esteves Pinto
- Children: Armando Falcão de Gusmão Fiúza
- Writing career
- Language: Portuguese
- Subjects: Society and politics
- Notable work: Revolucionários que Eu Conheci

Maria Armanda Pires Falcão (December 25, 1917 – August 19, 1996), better known by her pen name Vera Lagoa, was a Portuguese journalist and newspaper director. She was the first female television presenter in Portugal. She was also the first journalist to be prosecuted by a president of the Republic of Portugal.

A critic of both the right and left, she faced censorship early in her career and a bombing attack of her newspaper offices in the 1970s. Beginning in 1976, she served as director-for-life of her own newspaper, O Diabo.

== Early life ==
Maria Armanda Falcão was born on the Island of Mozambique in 1917, when Mozambique was still a Portuguese colony. Her parents were Armando Augusto Pires Falcão, a military officer who would later oppose the regime of António de Oliveira Salazar, and his second wife Beatriz Lúcia, who were both from Lisbon.

Her early life was turbulent due to her father's imprisonments and deportations, so she did not have the opportunity to continue her studies after 4th grade of primary school, and her remaining cultural and intellectual education was autodidactic, helped along by assistance from some of her father's friends. She began to work as a secretary to support her family, which was facing financial difficulties, after moving to Lisbon at age 16. (Her father was discharged from the army, where he had been a major, although he was posthumously reinstated after the Carnation Revolution as a colonel.)

She became an opponent of the Salazar regime, helping political prisoners and supporting the candidacy of Humberto Delgado.

== Career ==
=== First female RTP presenter ===
While Falcão was working as a secretary, she heard that the Portuguese public service TV channel Rádio e Televisão de Portugal was looking for a presenter. She went to speak with the head of the station and expressed her interest in the position. After passing all the tests, she was told there was one final condition: She would not be allowed to appear on television with black hair.

After dyeing her hair blonde, she appeared alongside Raul Feio in the first experimental broadcast of RTP on September 4, 1956, presenting a documentary about jewelry. This first broadcast had a low production value, with simple plastic sets and improvised dialogue. As there was no videotape widely available at the time, the transmission was recorded on film.

Although Falcão had all the qualifications to be a good presenter, she was dismissed from her position at RTP for having "too much personality": She refused to say, at the end of the broadcast, "See you tomorrow, God willing," as she was agnostic.

=== Society columnist ===
Frustrated with her TV career, Falcão became a writer for the Diário Popular, producing the society column Bisbilhotices (a title meaning "Gossip" that she hated and that was chosen without her input). It was there that she adopted the pen name Vera Lagoa, suggested by her friend Luís de Sttau Monteiro while they were out for dinner: "Vera" to indicate authenticity or veracity, and "Lagoa" being the name of the wine that they were drinking. Her articles for the Diário Popular were markedly irreverent, and she snuck in stinging social commentary amid the customary society reporting. She ended up leaving the newspaper and cutting ties with the administrator, eventual prime minister Francisco Pinto Balsemão, over his constant attempts at censorship of her writing.

=== Post-Estado Novo and director of O Diabo ===
Markedly leftist, Vera Lagoa joined the Socialist Party for a period after the Carnation Revolution put an end to the Estado Novo, but she soon became disillusioned with the new democratic regime and began shifting rightward politically. An independent and uncompromising woman, knowledgeable about the behind-the-scenes of Portuguese society and politics, she was disgusted by the number of opportunists and hypocrites who once supported the Estado Novo and rapidly switched to become vocal far-left radicals after the regime fell, persecuting those who did not do the same. She denounced these types in her 1977 book Revolucionários que Eu Conheci ("Revolutionaries I Knew").

For the weekly publication Tempo, edited by Nuno Rocha Morais, she wrote rousing articles against the Processo Revolucionário Em Curso government and such figures as Vasco Gonçalves and Francisco da Costa Gomes.

She was arrested and charged with insulting Costa Gomes for a piece titled "Perdi-lhe o respeito, Sr. Presidente," published in O Tempo in September 1975, and tried by the Tribunal da Boa Hora in Lisbon. This marked the first prosecution of a journalist by a president of the Portuguese Republic.

Feeling constrained, Lagoa left Tempo and on February 10, 1976, founded her own newspaper of which she was director-for-life, O Diabo, which was named for an anti-Salazar newspaper from the 1930s.

Later that month, O Diabo ran an editorial titled "O senhor Gomes de Chaves" criticizing then-President Francisco da Costa Gomes, which ended, "I don't like you. You are very ugly!" A few weeks later, the Revolutionary Council suspended the newspaper.

She then created a new weekly publication, O Sol, with the same editorial platform. O Sol was the target of a bombing attack shortly after its first issue was published. Though no one was killed in the blast, it left Lagoa with cardiac sequelae. She subsequently moved the paper's editing and printing operation to Porto, where she stayed for a time. The suspension of O Diabo was subsequently lifted, and it resumed publication on February 16, 1977, eventually moving back to Lisbon when the political climate eased.

Vera Lagoa became a vocal supporter of a variety of right-wing political causes. She opposed the way in which Portuguese decolonization of Africa was carried out under Mário Soares, and she criticized the actions of the Processo Revolucionário Em Curso, such as the imprisonment of Antónia Ramalho, the mother of António Ramalho Fialho, a civilian who was apparently arbitrarily shot to death by communist military personnel the day after the failed March 11, 1975, coup. She promoted the annual patriotic demonstrations to celebrate Portugal's independence on December 1. In 1980, she spoke out against the reelection of António Ramalho Eanes, whom she criticized as having ambiguous political attitudes, drawing communist support, and wanting to perpetuate the power of the Revolutionary Council. She called for a clear investigation into the plane crash that killed Francisco de Sá Carneiro and his companions, which she, among others including the political cartoonist Augusto Cid, believed was a bomb attack.

== Personal life ==
Maria Armanda Falcão was married three times: to Francisco António de Gusmão Fiúza, José Manuel Tengarrinha, and José Rebordão Esteves Pinto. With her first husband, she had a son, Armando Falcão de Gusmão Fiúza.

She died of a heart attack in Lisbon in 1996, at age 78.

== Selected works ==
- 1968 - Bisbilhotices
- 1975 - Crónicas do Tempo : 5-6-75 - 2-10-75
- 1977 - Revolucionários que eu conheci
- 1978 - A cambada: crónicas da liberdade adaptadas e baseadas nos artigos da autora publicados em "O Diabo" - "O Sol", "O Pais" e "O Diabo"
- 1980 - Eanes nunca mais!
