= Augusto Casimiro =

Portuguese journalist, poet and political commentator

- Born: 11 May 1889; São Gonçalo, Amarante, Portugal
- Died: 23 September 1967 (aged 78); Lisbon, Portugal
- Occupations: poet, journalist, professor

Augusto Casimiro dos Santos (11 May 1889 – 23 September 1967) was a Portuguese journalist, a poet and political commentator.

== Biography ==
Augusto Casimiro dos Santos was born in Amarante, he later studied at its primary school and lyceum. He attended a military school when he was 16 and was assigned in place with the Coimbra Infantry Regiments. He continued to study at the University of Coimbra.

He soon revealed himself as a poet and a chronicler, he became an author in 1906 and published his first periodical contribution in the 1910s and were related for raising its republican ideals.

As a lieutenant, he took part in the Portuguese Expeditionary Force in Flanders from 1917 to 1918. He was decorated with the Cross of the War, fourragère of the Tower of the Sword, Order of Christ, medal of Gold of Good Services, Military Cross, Legion of Honour, Order of Avis and the Order of Santiago where he was promoted to a captain during the campaign.

After the Great War, he taught at the Military College where he went on a campaign to mark entirely the border between Angola and Belgian Congo (now the Democratic Republic of the Congo) which was worked under the direction of Norton de Matos who was High Commissioner of the Republic in Angola.

He went for some years to Angola where he greatly wrote on colonial themes and characters.

He was a staunch opponent and was head of the movements of the republican opposition of Estado Novo which took power in 1926, he took part in the 1931 Madeira Revolt where he was later dismissed from the army. He was exiled to Cape Verde between 1933 and 1936, there, he wrote Ilhas Crioulas (Islands of Creole) in 1935 and two African related works. The work Ilhas Crioulas formed the last ingredient for the creation of an anti-colonial review titled Claridade published in 1936, nearly a year after the publication of the work. He returned in 1937 where he was put on reserve.

He kept a large literary activity, he published in many periodicals including A Águia and Seara Nova, he also contributed some articles in the reviews Serões (1910–1911), Azulejos (1907–1909), Amanhã in 1909 and Atlantida from 1915 to 1920.

In 1954, he published a collection of poems titled Portugal Atlântico — Poemas de África e de Mar (Atlantic Portugal: Poems from Africa and the Sea). One of the poetic works included O Vitória do Homem [Victory of Man] (1910), A Primeira Nau (1912), À Catalunha [today's form: A Catalunha, translation: Catalonia] (1914), Primavera de Deus [Spring of Gods] (1915), Livro das Bem-Amadas (1921) and A Vida Continua [Continued Life] (1942).

He translated the work D. Teodósio II (Theodosius II) by D. Francisco Manuel de Melo into early Modern Portuguese in 1944 and elaborated the biography of Catherine of Braganza (Bragança) which was published as Dona Catarina de Bragança, Rainha de Inglaterra, FIlha de Portugal [Catherine of Bragança (Bragance), Queen of England, Daughter of Portugal] in 1956.

He died in Lisbon on 23 September 1967.

== Published works ==
- Para a Vida [For the Life], 1906
- A Vitória do Homem, 1910
- A Tentação do Mar, 1911
- A Evocação da Vida, 1912
- O Elogio da Primavera, 1912
- A Primeira Nau, 1912
- À Catalunha, 1914
- Primavera de Deus, 1915
- A Hora de Nun'Álvares – versos, 1916
- Nas trincheiras: fortificação e combate (co-authored by Mouzinho de Albuquerque), 1917
- Nas Trincheiras da Flandres [Trenches in Flanders] (illustrations by Diogo de Macedo and Cristiano Cruz), 1918
- Sidónio Pais": algumas notas sobre a intervenção de Portugal na Grande Guerra [Sidónio Pais, Some Notes on the Invervention of Portugal Into the Great War], 1919
- Calvário da Flandres: 1918, 1920
- Oração Lusíada [Lusiad Orations]
- Os Portugueses e o Mundo [Portuguese and the World]
- O Livro das Bem Amadas
- O Livro dos Cavaleiros [Book of Knights]
- Naulila: 1914, 1922
- A Educação Popular e a Poesia [People's Education and Poetry], 1922
- África Nostra (Our Africa), 1923
- Nova Largada – Romance de África (New Little Road - African Novel), 1929
- Ilhas Crioulas (Islands of Creole), 1935
- A Alma Africana (African Soul_, 1936
- Paisagens de África (African Countrysides), 1936
- Cartilha Colonial (Colonial Map), 1937
- Momento na Eternidade (Moment of Eternity), 1940
- Portugal Crioulo (Creole Portugal), 1940
- A Vida Continua (Continued Life), 1942
- O Segredo de Potsdam (The Secret of Potsdam), 1945
- Lisboa Mourisca: 1147-1947 (Moorish Lisbon, 1147-1947), 1947
- Conquista da Terra: Hidráulica Agrícola Nacional (Conquest of Land: National Agricultural Hydraulics)
- Nun'Álvares e o seu Monumento (Nuno Álvares and His Monument)
- Portugal na História (Portugal in History), 1950
- S. Francisco Xavier e os Portugueses (St. Francis Xavier and the Portuguese), 1954
- Portugal Atlântico – Poemas da África e do Mar, 1955
- Dona Catarina de Bragança: Rainha de Inglaterra, filha de Portugal, 1956
- Angola e o Futuro: alguns problemas fundamentais (Angola and the Future: Some Fundamental Problems)

=== Posthumous work ===
- Obra Poética de Augusto Casimiro [Poetic Works by Augusto Casimiro] (preface by José Carlos Seara Pereira), Imprensa Nacional – Casa da Moeda, Lisbon, 2001 ISBN 972-27-1075-3

== Relevant literature ==
- Henriques, João Miguel. 2021. "Agusto Casimiro: um poeta nas trincheiras da Flandres." Studia Romanica et Anglica Zagrebiensia LXVI 103-108.
