= The Baron (film) =

- O Barão
- Directed by: Edgar Pêra
- Screenplay by: Luísa Costa Gomes; Edgar Pêra
- Based on: The Baron by Branquinho da Fonseca
- Produced by: Ana Costa
- Starring: Nuno Melo; Marcos Barbosa; Leonor Keil
- Cinematography: Luís Branquinho
- Edited by: Tiago Antunes; João Gomes
- Music by: Vozes da Rádio
- Production company: Cinemate
- Release date: October 2011 (Portugal)
- Running time: 87 minutes
- Country: Portugal
- Language: Portuguese

The Baron (Portuguese: O Barão) is a 2011 Portuguese film directed by Edgar Pêra, based on the 1942 novella of the same name by Branquinho da Fonseca.

Except for a brief scene, the film is completely black and white.

== Premise ==
The director, Edgar Pêra, explains the setting of the film.

"During the second world war, an American crew of B-Movies took refuge in Lisbon. In 1943, producer Valerie Lewton married with a Portuguese actor that translated to her Branquinho da Fonseca's story The Baron. The dictator heard about the movie and ordered it destroyed. The crew was repatriated. The Portuguese actors were deported to the Tarrafal concentration camp. They died tortured in the "skillet", a cubicle where humans were roasted. In 2005, two reels and the screenplay were found in the archives of Barreiro's kino-club. For the next five years the film was restored and reshot. In 2011, it was shown for the first time."

A school inspector travels to a village and meets the Baron, a decadent aristocrat.

== Cast ==
- Nuno Melo as The Baron
- Marcos Barbosa as The inspector
- Leonor Keil as Idalina
- Marina Albuquerque as The teacher
- Paula Só as Grandmother
- Vítor Correia as The miller
- Miguel Sermão as The guardian
- Jorge Prendas as Mr. Alçada
- Rogério Rosa as The innskeeper

== Reception ==
=== Awards ===
Year	Award	Category	Individual	Result
2011	Caminhos do Cinema Português	Best Film		Nominated
2011	Caminhos do Cinema Português	Adapted Screenplay	Luísa Costa Gomes and Edgar Pêra	Won
2011	Caminhos do Cinema Português	Best Cinematography	Luís Branquinho	Won
2011	Caminhos do Cinema Português	Best Make Up	Jorge Bragada	Won
2011	Caminhos do Cinema Português	Best Editing	Tiago Antunes	Won
2012	Prémio Autores	Best Screenplay	Luísa Costa Gomes and Edgar Pêra	Nominated
2012	Prémio Autores	Best Actor	Nuno Melo	Won
2012	Golden Globes (Portugal)	Best Film		Nominated
2012	Golden Globes (Portugal)	Best Actor	Nuno Melo	Won

=== Critical reception ===
Dejan Ognjanovic in BEYOND HOLLYWOOD:

- ""The Baron" is a Portuguese film shot in retro-modern-scope, in glorious high contrast Black and White, boasting to be "a 2-D film by Edgar Pêra". One could say that it is modern precisely in its anti-modernity. It is almost impossible to describe this film without relying on comparisons: The Baron looks and feels like a weird re-enactment of a 1930s horror film through the arty lens of a very talented modern director – something along the lines of Almereyda's "Nadja", Merhige's "Begotten" and Maddin's "Dracula: Pages from a Virgin's Diary". There are also droning soundscapes and grotesquely nightmarish non-sequitur situations in which humor and horror are disquietingly close reminiscent of David Lynch. (...)"

Eurico de Barros:

- "Signed by the most persistently individualistic portuguese filmmaker, The Baron is the metamorphosis of a literary work from the 1940s into a oniric phantasmagoria, surreal and cinephile to the core. “

Jorge Mourinha in The FLICKERING WALL:

- "For cult Portuguese veteran Edgar Pêra, this adaptation of writer Branquinho da Fonseca's 1942 novella about a big city bureaucrat caught in the seductive wave of a decadent country aristocrat was a long-gestating project, following on his 2007 little-seen filming of the writer's sole novel, Rio Turvo. On paper, O Barão seems to have little to do with mr. Pêra's surreal cyber-DIY aesthetics, until one realises that he uses it as an unexpectedly accessible synthesis, both stylistic and thematic, of his 30-year directorial career on the fringes of mainstream film-making. His explorations of Portuguese history and character are visible in the parable of the Baron as a metaphor for an old, parochial country, corrupt, debauched, hypocritical; his fascination with genre cinema, B-movies and trash eccentricity comes through in Luís Branquinho's dazzling high-contrast black-and-white cinematography and the director's decision to film the story as a throwback to 1930s Universal and 1950s cheap B-series horror movies as helmed by an epileptic Guy Maddin, with mr. Pêra's regular accomplice Nuno Melo channeling Bela Lugosi and Klaus Kinski in his portrayal of the Baron. The result is the director's most accessible fiction yet, playfully described on the press notes as a "2D movie", although it never fully abandons mr. Pêra's playful, often impenetrable way with narrative and insistence on highly baroque visuals (the creativity of the English subtitling is wondrous and yet over the top). Yet O Barão is also an unapologetically romantic tale of love and regret (as indeed most classic horror movies) and the director's most sincere work yet."

Bruno Ramos e Rui Brazuna:

- "The imaginary of Branquinho da Fonseca is transmuted in a way never seen before".

Gerwin Tamsma, Rotterdam Film Festival programmer:

- 'They don't make them like this any more' is the initial, paradoxical thought that crops up whilst watching the magnificent The Baron. Perhaps Edgar Pera's most ambitious film so far comes across like an apparition from the last century, and makes no bones about it. Whether this is true or not, The Baron announces itself as an attempt to remake a film destroyed by Portuguese dictator Salazar's political police before it could be finished. This point of departure is vaguely reminiscent of A Short Film About the Indo Nacional and Indepencia by Raya Martin from the Philippines, who tries to use his films to give his country a film history it doesn't have. Or perhaps even wishes to add an essential, missing element to prevent history from being perverted forever by the cruel consequences of dictatorship, poverty and censorship.'
