= National colours of Portugal =

Flag of Portugal
- Other names: Bandeira das Quinas (Flag of the quinas ("Quina" being a Portuguese word meaning "a group of five")), Bandeira Verde-Rubra (Green-Red Flag)
- Use: National flag and ensign
- Proportion: 2:3
- Adopted: 30 June 1911; 115 years ago
- Design: A 2:3 vertically striped bicolour of green and red, with the lesser coat of arms of Portugal centered over the colour boundary

Portugal's national colours consist of red and green, which are present on the Portuguese flag.

The current flag of Portugal was officially approved on June 30, 1911. It was chosen by a special commission consisting of members such as Columbano Bordalo Pinheiro, João Chagas, and Abel Botelho, to serve as the national flag for the First Portuguese Republic, with the main colours consisting of green and red.

The incorporation of the colour green into the national flag of Portugal marked a significant departure from tradition and reflected a notable shift inspired by republican principles. The hues of red and green had been closely associated with the Portuguese Republican Party and gained momentum following the Republican Revolution of 1910, with green symbolizing optimism and hope while red represented the bloodshed of those who fought for the nation (This is not yet confirmed though). This sentiment was intended to exude patriotism and dignity, rather than political affiliation. The current flag design represents a break from the prior standard, which was intimately linked to the royal arms and showcased blue and white. The flag has undergone various modifications over time, with significant alterations occurring during critical political events, and Portugal's royalty in Portugal's History.

The colour tones of the flag are not precisely specified in any legal document. Recommendations are listed below:

| Scheme | Red | Green | Yellow | Blue | White | Black |
|---|---|---|---|---|---|---|
| PMS | 485 CVC | 349 CVC | 803 CVC | 288 CVC | — | Black 6 CVC |
| RGB | 255-0-0 | 0-102-0 | 255-255-0 | 0-51-153 | 255-255-255 | 0-0-0 |
| RGB | #FF0000 | #006600 | #FFFF00 | #003399 | #FFFFFF | #000000 |
| CMYK | 0-100-100-0 | 100-35-100-30 | 0-0-100-0 | 100-100-25-10 | 0-0-0-0 | 0-0-0-100 |

== History of the red and green colours ==
Although the colours red and green were not originally part of Portugal's national flag until 1910, they were present in various historical banners during significant periods. For instance, King John I used a Green Aviz Cross on the red border of his banner, and the red cross of the Order of Christ was frequently used on ship sails during naval expeditions. Additionally, a green background version of the banner was popular during the 1640 revolution that led to Portugal's independence from Spain. However, there are no registered sources to confirm that this was the origin of the Republican colours.

Another explanation credits the flag that was raised on the balcony of Porto's city hall during the 1891 insurrection as the inspiration for the current flag. This flag consisted of a red field with a green disc and the inscription Centro Democrático Federal "15 de Novembro" (Federal Democratic Center "15 November"), which represented one of many masonry-inspired republican clubs. Over the next 20 years, the red and green colours were present on every republican item in Portugal.

The red colour in the flag symbolizes the republican-inspired masonry-backed revolutionaries, while the green colour was added to distinguish the flag from the old royal standard, which had a solid red background. Additionally, green was the colour that Auguste Comte had designated to be present in the flags of positivist nations, and this ideal was incorporated into the republican political matrix.
