= Caetano da Costa Alegre =

Portuguese poet (1864–1890)

- Born: April 26, 1864; São Tomé Island
- Died: 18 April 1890 (aged 25); Alcobaça, Portugal
- Occupation: poet

Caetano da Costa Alegre (26 April 1864 – 18 April 1890) was a Portuguese poet.

== Biography ==
Born to a Cape Verdean crioulo family in the colony of São Tomé in Portuguese São Tomé and Príncipe, off the coast of Africa, he settled in Portugal in 1882 and attended medical school in Lisbon, hoping to become a naval doctor. He died of tuberculosis in Alcobaça before he could fulfill his dream.

He wrote several reviews under his name including A Imprensa (1885-1891) and A Leitura (1894–96), the last one was posthumously published.

== Publications of his poems ==
In 1916, a friend, journalist Cruz Magalhãez, published the poetry he wrote during the eight years Costa Alegre lived in Portugal. The work, written in the popular romantic style of the time, was an immediate success, not least because of how it celebrates his African origins, expresses longing for his home in São Tomé, and describes the sense of alienation he feels because of his race. He expresses his sorrow after being rejected by a white woman because of the color of his skin in one of the earliest attempts by an African poet to deal with issues of race. Three republications of his poems were made in 1950, 1951 and in 1994.

== Poetic style ==
Though distinctly European in style, the themes of Costa Alegre's work make him a precursor to later African authors and poets, who dealt with issues of race, alienation, and nostalgic reveries for the past (in his case, his reminiscences about São Tomé).

== Poems ==
One of the poems he wrote was Visão meaning vision.

Vi-te passar, longe de mim, distante,
Como uma estátua de ébano ambulante;
Ias de luto, doce, tutinegra,
E o teu aspecto pesaroso e triste
Prendeu minha alma, sedutora negra;
Depois, cativa de invisível laço,
(o teu encanto, a que ninguém resiste)
Foi-te seguindo o pequenino passo
Até que o vulto gracioso e lindo
Desapareceu, longe de mim, distante,
Como uma estátua de ébano ambulante.

== See also ==
- Cape Verdean people in São Tomé and Príncipe
