= The Baron (novella) =

1942 postmodern novella by Branquinho da Fonseca

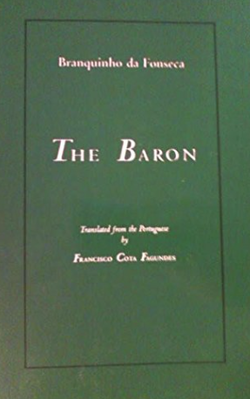
- Author: Branquinho da Fonseca (as António Madeira)
- Original title: O Barão
- Translator: Francisco Cota Fagundes (1996); John Byrne (1997)
- Language: Portuguese
- Publication date: 1942
- Publication place: Portugal

The Baron (Portuguese: O Barão) is a 1942 postmodern novella by Branquinho da Fonseca originally published under his pen name António Madeira. The plot revolves around a visiting school inspector who encounters an eccentric and moody baron living in a medieval manor house.

== Plot summary ==
The narrator, a Lisbon-based elementary school inspector who dislikes his job, arrives in a village in Serra do Barroso and meets a female teacher, who promptly sends a message up the mountain to the Baron. Soon, the Baron comes and invites him to his manor with the declaration "I give the orders around here!" On the way, the Baron talks about his life at the University of Coimbra and continues to talk after their arrival in his huge but seemingly empty house. Nothing but wine is offered even as his guest starves. Finally, he has a maid named Idalina prepare food while he babbles on about his past: how he swapped women with his father for his money, how he defiled a girl named Emília and drove her to suicide, and how he kidnapped Idalina from her village over twenty years ago. After dinner, a group of hooded musicians arrive and perform two pieces, which are concluded by a baptism-like ceremony, with the group sharing bread and wine and the Baron showering in wine. The Baron then announces he will go to Sleeping Beauty's Castle. He takes the inspector with him but abandons him midway. The inspector, also very drunk, sees Idalina and tactlessly tries to seduce her. He retires to his bedroom but his cigarette causes the bed to catch fire as he sleeps. He is rescued by Idalina and the Baron. The two men resume their drinking–discussion, with the inspector confessing an unhappy affair for the first time in his life. They go to the garden, and the Baron picks a rose for his beloved. They continue their wandering. When the Baron senses his servants following, he fires several bullets in their direction. All the while he talks incoherently about how he and his star-crossed separated. Finally they arrive at a wall, and the Baron leaves the inspector with his dogs. The inspector walks aimlessly for a long time until he can walk no more. At daybreak he borrows a donkey from a miller and returns to the manor, where the Baron has returned with a bullet in his shoulder and a fractured skull — but he is already out of danger. Apparently the Baron had climbed up Sleeping Beauty's Castle and placed his rose at her window in the darkness of the night. The story concludes with the narrator announcing his desire to revisit the Baron.

== Translations ==
There are at least two English versions:

- Francisco Cota Fagundes' translation: The Baron. Center for Portuguese Studies, University of California, Santa Barbara. 1996. ISBN 0-942208-30-7.
- John Byrne's translation: Lisboa, Eugénio, ed. (1997). "The Baron". Professor Pfiglzz and His Strange Companion and Other Portuguese Stories. Carcanet. pp. 38–66. ISBN 1-85754-241-X.

== Themes ==
José Régio argues that the realistic and the fantastic are inseparable in the story. David Mourão-Ferreira notes that the first part was more realistic and the transition to the mythic brings out the plot's multidimensionality, which parallels that of the titular character. Ricardo da Silveira Lobo Sternberg, who considers the narrator the central character, describes the two main characters as "polar opposites" in the beginning and "in reality one and the same" by the end. Maria Aparecida Santilli has pointed out the Baron's dual-personality: one capable of platonic love and one that impulsively exploits women.

Nelly Novaes Coelho sees the inspector as a representative of extreme Rationalism and the Baron as creativity and the enterprising spirit. Edward A. Riggio sees the Baron as an embodiment of medieval Portugal. Yvone David-Peyre also notes the abundant motifs from medieval romance like the rose, Sleeping Beauty, and the castle. Leland Guyer interprets the work as an intertext of the medieval Spanish poem Dark Night of the Soul by San Juan de la Cruz.

== Adaptations ==
In 1968, Luís de Sttau Monteiro adapted the novella into a play.

The 2011 film adaptation was directed by Edgar Pêra and stars Nuno Melo as the Baron.
