= Atlantida (Portuguese magazine) =

- Staff writers: Luís de Montalvor
- Categories: Cultural magazine
- Founded: 1915
- Final issue: 1920
- Country: Portugal; Brazil
- Language: Portuguese

Atlantida: mensário artístico, literário e social para Portugal e Brasil (Atlantis: artistic, literary and social monthly for Portugal and Brazil) was a magazine published in Portugal and Brazil from 1915 to 1920. It resulted from an idealized project from the directors João de Barros and João do Rio, in order to foster the relationship between the two countries. These relationships between "sister nations" occupy a central theme of the magazine during World War I, portrayed as "a suitable moment to create ties between the two states, based on race, traditions and common history, and the notion of Latinity." They also sought to emphasize connections between Portuguese and Brazilian cultures.

Collaborators included:

- Augusto Casimiro, Guerra Junqueiro, Jaime Cortesão, José de Campos Pereira, José de Macedo and Teófilo Braga on concerns about the First World War;
- Agostinho de Campos, António Carneiro Leão, Barbosa de Magalhães, Delfim Santos, João de Barros, João de Deus Ramos, Leonardo Coimbra and Lúcio dos Santos under education and teaching;
- José de Figueiredo and Aquilino Ribeiro in art criticism;
- Avelino de Almeida in theater;
- Joaquim Manso and Júlio Brandão in literature;
- Humberto Avelar in music.

Camilo Pessanha, Delfim Guimarães, Fausto Guedes Teixeira, Afonso Lopes Vieira and Henrique de Vasconcelos also collaborated. "Atlantida" had Graça Aranha as its correspondent director in Paris, who announced collaborations with Camille Mauclair, Edmond Jaloux, Gaston Riou and François de Miomande.

In the area of plastic arts, Atlantida reprinted in its pages pictures and drawings by Alberto de Sousa, Almada Negreiros, António Carneiro, António Soares, Columbano Bordalo Pinheiro, João Vaz, José Malhoa, José Pacheko, Mário Navarro da Costa, Raul Lino, Soares dos Reis and Veloso Salgado. It is also worth highlighting other contributions by Gabriele d'Annunzio, Guilherme Ferrero and Salomon Reinach.
