= Augusto Cid =

Portuguese cartoonist, caricaturist and sculptor

- Born: 1941; Horta, Azores, Portugal
- Died: 14 March 2019 (aged 77–78); Lisbon, Portugal
- Occupations: cartoonist, caricaturist, sculptor, illustrator

Augusto José de Matos Sobral Cid (1941–2019), better known as Augusto Cid was a Portuguese cartoonist, caricaturist, illustrator, and sculptor.

== Early life ==
Cid was the son of Fernando Augusto de Resende Sobral Cid and Maria Manuela Bicker Correia Ribeiro. He was born in Horta on Faial Island in the Azores when his father, an army lieutenant, was posted there and his wife accompanied him. Cid completed secondary studies at the Colégio Infante de Sagres and Colégio Moderno in Lisbon, and then studied in the US. Later, he attended a sculpture course at the Lisbon School of Fine Arts, after serving in Angola at a time when Portuguese men were conscripted to oppose independence movements in the Portuguese colonies.

== Career as a cartoonist ==
Cid tried several jobs but his career as a caricaturist and a cartoonist only took off after the Carnation Revolution of 25 April 1974 when the censorship imposed by the Estado Novo dictatorship was lifted. His first published cartoons were with Povo Livre, the official organ of the then Democratic People's Party (PPD), a right-of-centre party. He also designed the PPD's logo. Later he published in newspapers such as O Diabo, O Independente, Grande Reportagem and Semanário, a weekly journal founded by, among others, the present president of Portugal, Marcelo Rebelo de Sousa. His controversial cartoons often attacked extreme left politicians such as the Communist Party leader Álvaro Cunhal. Despite the lifting of censorship, two of his books, O Superman and Eanito, el Estático, both poking fun at António Ramalho Eanes who was the president between 1976 and 1986, were seized as a result of court orders.

In addition to his artistic work, he was noted for his commitment to identifying the causes of the 1980 Camarate plane crash in which the president, Francisco de Sá Carneiro and Adelino Amaro da Costa, the first civilian defence minister after the revolution, were killed. Cid was convinced that the plane had crashed as a result of a bomb and it was largely due to him that the idea that it was not an accident emerged. The actual cause has never been satisfactorily resolved.

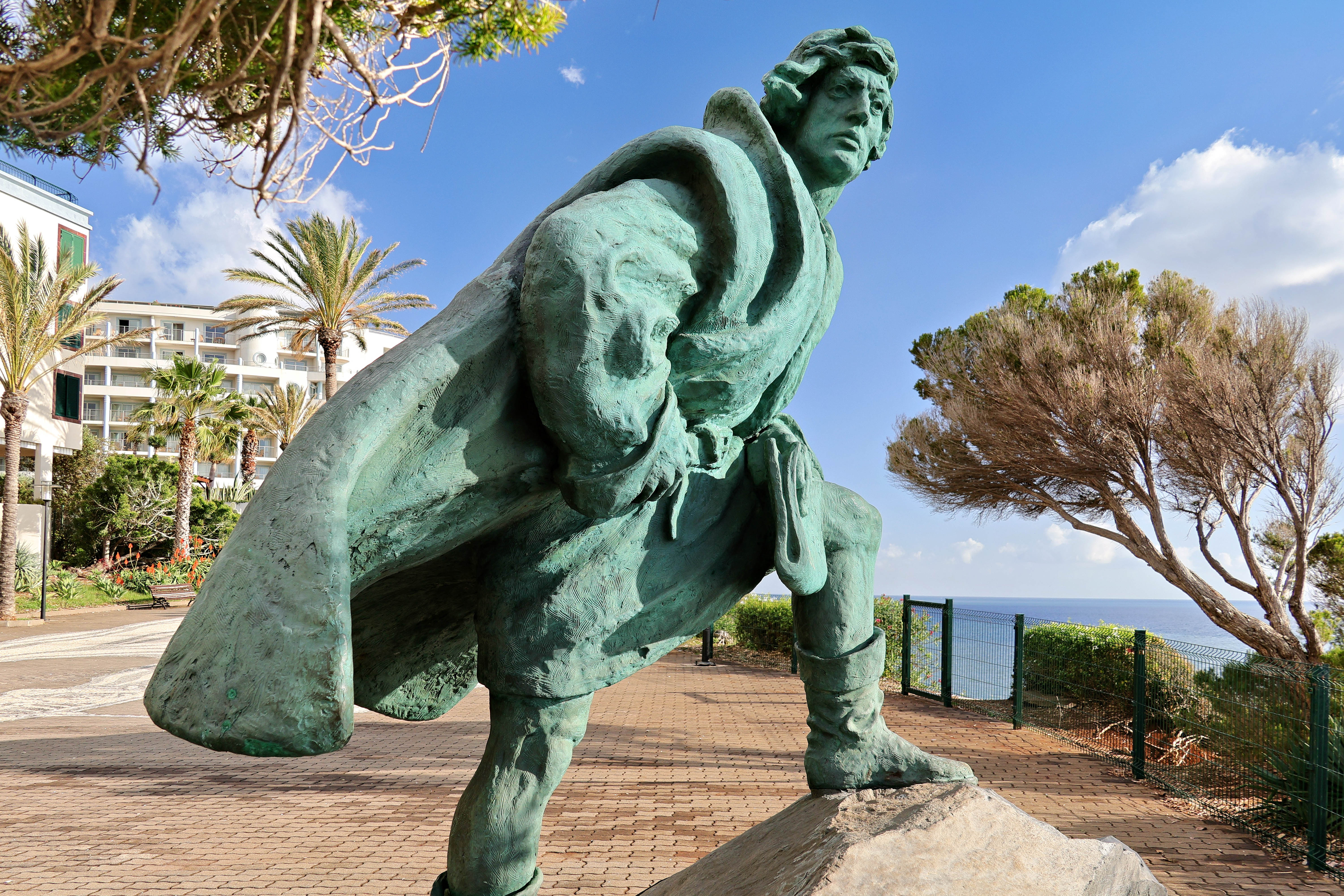
Statue of João Gonçalves Zarco by Cid

== Sculpture ==
In September 2012 Cid announced his retirement from cartooning, to dedicate himself exclusively to sculpture. Nevertheless, at the end of 2015, he resumed his activity as a cartoonist, in the weekly newspaper Sol, using bullfighting analogies. As a sculptor, he sculpted a tribute to the victims of the September 11 attacks in New York City in 2001, which is to be found in Lisbon at the intersection of the Avenida de Roma and the Avenida dos Estados Unidos da América; a statue in honour of Nuno Álvares Pereira a 14th-century Portuguese general, who played a major role in ensuring the independence of Portugal from Spain; and a statue in Funchal, Madeira of João Gonçalves Zarco, an early explorer.

== Awards and recognition ==
On June 9, 1994, Cid was made Commander of the Portuguese Order of Prince Henry. Among other distinctions, he received the First Prize for Humorous Drawing at the National Caricature Salon (1987), the Grand Prize of the National Caricature Exhibition (1990 and 1994), the National Press Humour Award (1996), the Stuart Comic Strip Award (Prémio Stuart de Tira Cómica – 2005) and the Porto Cartoon World Festival Grand Prize (2008).

A retrospective of his work was held at the Rafael Bordalo Pinheiro Museum in Lisbon in 1990 and Augusto Cid - O Cavaleiro do Cartoon was put on at the National Press Museum in Porto in 2004, which was accompanied by a catalogue written by Cid. A retrospective exhibition of his cartoons and caricatures was presented in 2023–24 at Casa Sommer in Cascais, entitled History(s) of Portugal in Cartoon: Augusto Cid: 1941–2019. Cid left his intellectual estate to the Cascais Municipal Historical Archive in 2019, with the purpose of ensuring its preservation and public enjoyment.

== Death ==
Cid died on 14 March 2019, after a long illness. He is buried at the Alto de São João Cemetery in Lisbon.

== Publications ==
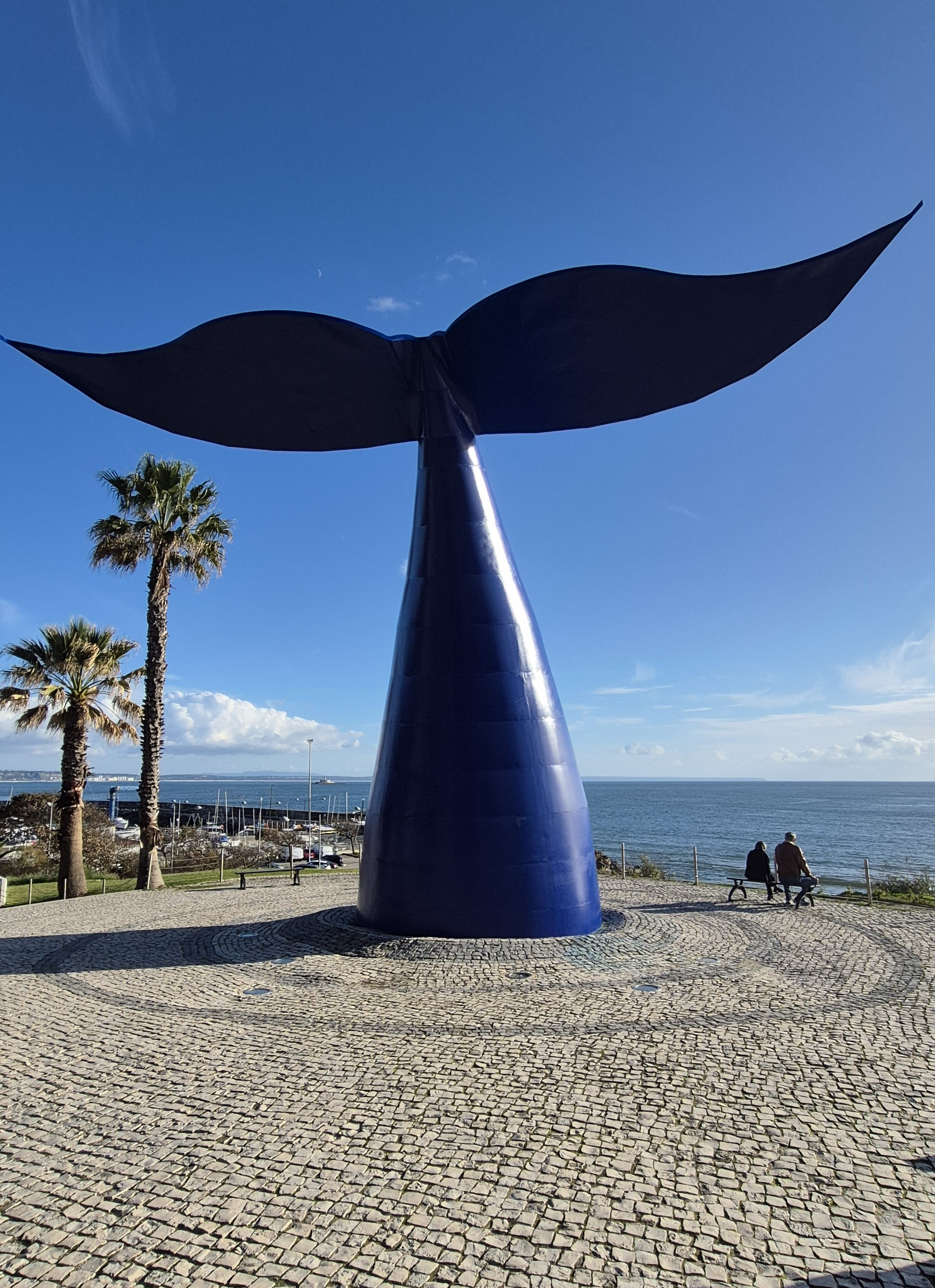
O Mergulho da Baleia (The Whale's Dive) by Cid.

More than 30 books of Cid's work, or including his work, have been published.

- Que se passa na frente
- PREC - Processo Revolucionário Eventualmente Chocante
- PREC II
- O Superman
- Eanito, el Estático
- O Último Tarzan
- O fim do PREC
- Demito-me uma Ova
- Bicas e Bocas
- Camarate (1984)
- Camarate: Como, Porquê e Quem (1987)
- Agarra, Mas Não Abuses
- Alto Cão Traste
- O Produto Interno Brito
- Cão Traste
- Seguros Cartoon Book
- Desculpe o Mau Jeito...
- Soares é Fish
- Cartoons do Ano 1999
- 25 dos 4
- Cartoons do Ano 2000
- Cartoons do Ano 2002
- Cartoons do Ano 2003
- Cartoons do Ano 2004
- Augusto Cid: O Cavaleiro do Cartoon
- O Fenómeno
- Cartoons do Ano 2005
- Cartoons do Ano 2006
- Cartoons do Ano 2007
- Cartoons do Ano 2008
- Porreiro, Pá!
- Cartoons do Ano 2009
- Cartoons do Ano 2010
