= Luís de Montalvor =

Portuguese poet

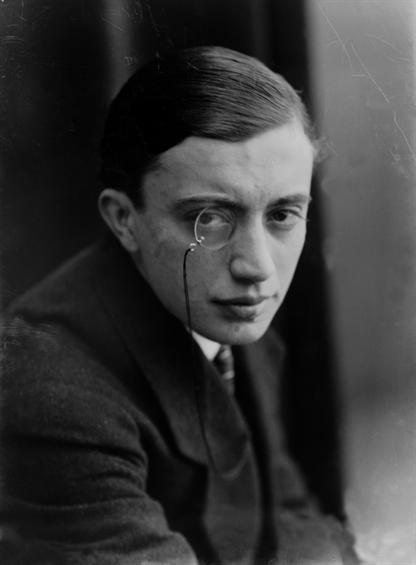
- Luís de Montalvor
- Born: January 31, 1891; São Vicente, Cape Verde
- Died: 2 March 1947 (aged 56); Lisbon, Portugal
- Other name: Luís da Silva Ramos.
- Occupation: poet

Luís de Montalvor (January 31, 1891 – March 2, 1947) was a pseudonym of Portuguese poet and editor Luís Filipe de Saldanha da Gama da Silva Ramos.

He founded the reviews Orpheu (modern Portuguese spelling: Orfeu) [Orpheus] 1914 and Centauro (Centaur) in 1916 and also worked in other reviews including Atlantida [Atlantis] (1915–20), Contemporânea (1915–26) [Contemporary], Presença and Sudoeste in 1935.

In 1933, he founded Editorial Ática, Lda. with its headquarters at a small ship at Rua das Chagas in Lisbon, in the early 1940s, he adopted the firm "Ática, S.A.R.L., Casa Editora"

In 1942, he published for the publishing company Ática (Attica) on the collection of poems made by the renowned Fernando Pessoa, the first of five volumes titled Complete Works (Obras Completas) of Fernando Pessoa, the remaining were Poems by Álvaro de Campos [Poesias de Álvaro de Campos] (1944), Odes by Ricardo Reis [Odes de Ricardo Reis] (1945), Mensagem [Messages] (1945) and Poems by Alberto Caeiro [Poemas de Alberto Caeiro] (1946), under Pessoa's pseudonyms.

== Works ==
- História do regime republicano em Portugal [History of the Portuguese Republic Regime] (1929)
- A arte indígena portuguesa [Portuguese Indigenous Art] (1934) with Diogo de Macedo

=== Posthumous works ===
- Poemas [Poems] (1960)
- O livro de poemas de Luís de Montalvor [Book of Poems by Luís de Montalvor] (1998)
- Tentativa de um ensaio sobre a decadência (2008)
- «Para o túmulo de Fernando Pessoa»: e outras prosas (2015)
