= Vitorino Nemésio =

Portuguese writer (1901–1978)

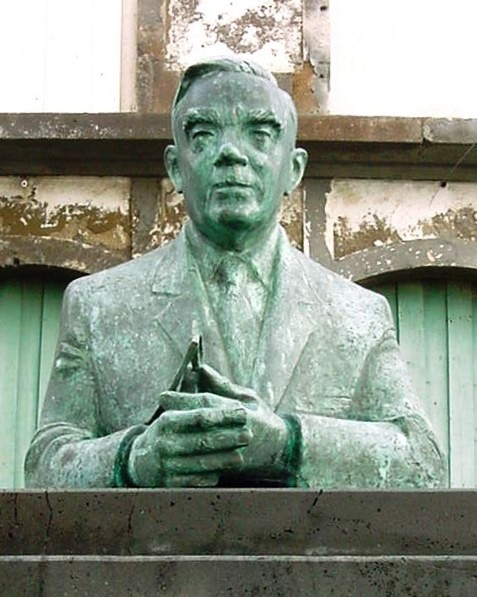
- Bust of the author Vitorino Nemésio
- Born: Vitorino Nemésio Mendes Pinheiro da Silva; 19 December 1901; Praia da Vitória, Terceira
- Died: 20 February 1978 (aged 76); Lisbon
- Resting place: Lisbon
- Education: Post-Secondary
- Alma mater: University of Coimbra, University of Lisbon
- Occupation: Poet
- Spouse: Gabriela Monjardino de Azevedo Gomes
- Children: 4
- Writing career
- Language: Portuguese
- Period: 1916-1976
- Genres: Fiction, Romance, Poetry, Biography
- Subjects: Existensialism, Revolutionary Humanism, Neo-Realism
- Notable work: Mau Tempo No Canal (1944)
- Notable awards: Ricardo Malheiros Literary Prize 1944 Mau Tempo no Canal; National Literary Prize 1965; Montaigne Prize 1974
- Movement: Republican

Vitorino Nemésio Mendes Pinheiro da Silva (19 December 1901 – 20 February 1978) was a Portuguese poet, author and intellectual from Terceira, Azores, best known for his novel Mau Tempo No Canal (literally, Bad Weather in the Channel but published in an English translation as Stormy Isles – An Azorean Tale), as well as a professor in the Faculty of Letters the University of Lisbon and member of the Academy of Sciences of Lisbon.

== Biography ==
Vitorino Nemésio was born in 1901 in Praia da Vitória, on Terceira island, Azores. He was the son of Vitorino Gomes da Silva and Maria da Glória Mendes Pinheiro.

Nemésio did not excel academically. He was "expelled" from secondary school in Angra do Heroísmo and resat his fifth year. However, Nemésio had fond memories of his history teacher, Manuel António Ferreira Deusdado, who introduced him to literature.

After travelling at 16 to the district capital of Horta, Nemésio sat exams as an external student at the Liceu Nacional, completing them on 16 July. While at the school, he contributed to the magazine Eco Académico: Semanário dos Alunos do Liceu de Angra and helped to found the magazine Estrela d'Alva: Revista Literária Ilustrada e Noticiosa. On 13 August, the newspaper O Telégrafo reported that Nemésio had sent a copy of Canto Matinal, his first book of poetry written in 1916, to the newspaper's director Manuel Emídio.

Although relatively young, Nemésio had already developed republican ideals. He had participated in literary, republican, and anarchist-unionist meetings while living in Angra do Heroismo. He was influenced by friend, Jaime Brasil, lawyer Luís da Silva Ribeiro, and author and librarian Gervásio Lima.

In 1918, toward the end of the First World War, Horta was a centre of maritime commerce with a vibrant night life. It was an obligatory port of call, a place for refueling ships and giving time off to the crew. Horta was home also to the Submarine Telegraph Cable companies, which turned the city into a global communications hub. This cosmopolitan environment contributed to Nemésio's later writings, especially Mau Tempo no Canal, which he began writing in 1939.

=== Academia ===
In Lisbon, Nemésio worked as a coordinator for A Pátria, A Imprensa de Lisboa and Última Hora, while completing his secondary school studies in Coimbra (starting in 1921). He eventually enrolled in the Faculty of Law at the University of Coimbra and worked as an editor in the student newspaper. By 1923, he joined the Coimbra Revolta Lodge of the Grand Order of Lusitania, a masonic group. In 1925, he switched from Law to Social and Applied Sciences in the Faculty of Letters to concentrate on the Historical and Geographic Sciences. During his first trip to Spain with the Academic Choir in 1923, he met Spanish writer, philosopher, and republican Miguel Unamuno, with whom he would correspond for years. With Afonso Duarte, António de Sousa, Branquinho da Fonseca, Gaspar Simões, among others, he founded the magazine Tríptico. His studies turned to Romance Languages by 1925. He worked with José Régio, João Gaspar Simões, and António de Sousa on the journal Humanidade: Quinzenário de Estudantes de Coimbra.

On 12 February 1926, he married Gabriela Monjardino de Azevedo Gomes in Coimbra, with whom he would have four children: Georgina (born in November 1926), Jorge (born in April 1929), Manuel (born in July 1930) and Ana Paula (born at the end of 1931).

In 1930, Nemésio moved to the Faculty of Letters at the University of Lisbon. He completed his degree in Romance Languages a year later before teaching Italian Literature and Spanish Literature. In 1934, he received his Doctorate in Letters from the University of Lisbon with his thesis A Mocidade de Herculano Até à Volta do Exílio (transl. The Youth of Herculano until His Return from Exile). Between 1937 and 1939, he lectured at the Université Libre de Bruxelles, returning afterwards to the Faculty of Letters in Lisbon.

In 1944, Nemésio published his most complex, dense, and subtle novel, Mau Tempo No Canal. It is considered one of the major works of contemporary Portuguese literature. Set in the islands of Faial, Pico, São Jorge and Terceira, the novel evokes the period of 1917–1919 when the author lived in Horta, and features people such as Dr. José Machado de Serpa (a Republican senator), Father Nunes da Rosa (professor at the secondary school) and Osório Goulart (poet), met by the writer at that time. After this seminal work, Nemésio never wrote another novel. In an unpublished epilogue, under the title Morro autor de um romance único (English: I will die as the author of a single novel), he stated that Mau Tempo No Canal was the high-point in his long literary career.

On visiting Horta for a second time, in 1946, he wrote Corsário das Ilhas (transl. Corsair from the Islands), in which he reflected on his schooling.

Thirty years later, Nemésio continued to remember the village of Horta as his "first refuge, of patriarchal hospitality and gentility in everything, or for everything".

In 1958, he lectured in Brazil. On 12 September 1971, reaching public service retirement age after 40 years of service, he gave his final lecture at the Faculty in Lisbon.

=== Later life ===
He authored and presented the television program Se bem me lembro (transl. If I remember well), which contributed to his popularity. From 11 December 1975 to 25 October 1976, he directed the newspaper O Dia.

He died on 20 February 1978 in Lisbon at the CUF Hospital. Before his death, he asked his son to bury him in the cemetery of Santo António dos Olivais and that the bells should play the Alleluia. He was buried in Coimbra.

== Legacy ==
Mau Tempo no Canal has been read as a source for the spatial understanding of the Azores. Architect and researcher Celina Vale, comparing the novel with Raul Brandão's As Ilhas Desconhecidas, argued that both works characterise the island territory "through the co-presence of sea and land", and that Nemésio's descriptions of Horta, presented as "a front-row theater box" facing the channel and Pico, show the Azorean city as a spectator of the sea. Vale also linked Nemésio's 1932 concept of açorianidade ("Azoreanity"), in which insularity is portrayed as a product of the sea, to the idea of the archipelago as a single territory of land and water.

== Published works ==
His early literary writings were inspired by the Azores. Afonso Lopes Vireira would later note the presence of "childhood memories, and loves, pains and figures of humility, who in these pages, are alive and obsessed with the sea". Vitorino Nemésio's personal experiences are generally present in his published works, beginning with his volume of stories in Paço do Milhafre, in 1924. (Note: Prefaced by Afonso Lopes Vieira, it was later retitled O Mistério do Paço do Milhafre.) During his long literary career, the author never stopped surprising readers. In his novellas, for example, he transmitted a sense of originality, in particular with his descriptions of places and complex characters, in which he was generously human (such as in Varanda de Pilatos, published in 1927, or his volume of novellas A Casa Fechada, comprising three stories: O Tubarão, Negócio de Pomba and A Casa Fechada).

Vitorino Nemésio was one of the great writers of contemporary Portuguese literature. He was awarded the Prémio Nacional da Literatura (Portugal) in 1965 and the Montaigne Prize in 1974. He was a writer of fiction and poetry, a chronicler, a biographer, a historian of literature, a journalist, a philosopher, a letter writer, a language expert and a television writer.

Generally regional in his perspectives, his works elaborated on Azorean life, along with sentimental memories of his childhood, revealing a populist preoccupation with simple people who were profoundly human and living through aspects of human suffering. He published biographies, including his doctoral dissertation on Alexandre Herculano, and his biography of Queen Saint Elizabeth of Portugal. He also wrote of his journeys to Brazil, the Azores and Madeira, discussed diverse subjects associated with Portuguese and Brazilian history, including a dissertation on Gil Vicente, and wrote poetry criticism.

Nemésio was also a poet and uninterruptedly published from 1916 (Canto Matinal) to 1976 (Era do Átomo Crise do Homem). Óscar Lopes, writing on his poetry, noted two currents of verse in his work Nem toda a Noite a Vida (English: Not All Night Is There Life). The first current is mostly regional; in particular, nostalgia for island life, childhood, adolescence, his father and first forbidden love, which are obvious in O Bicho Harmonioso (English: The Harmonious Beast) and Eu, Comovido a Oeste. In his later works there is a transformation, his themes are more metaphysical and religious in tone; he debated themes of life and death, of being and the search for the meaning of life: purely existentialist philosophy. In addition, the writer cultivated a popular poetry marked by Azorean symbolism, for which he was regularly accused of being a "regionalist".

=== Poetry ===
- Canto Matinal (1916)
- O Bicho Harmonioso (1938)
- Eu, Comovido a Oeste (1940)
- Festa Redonda (1950)
- Nem Toda a Noite a Vida (1953)
- O Pão e a Culpa (publicada em 1955)
- O Verbo e a Morte (1959)
- Canto de Véspera (1966)
- Sapateia Açoriana, Andamento Holandês e Outros Poemas (1976)

=== Fiction ===
- Paço de Milhafre (1924)
- Varanda de Pilatos (1926)
- Mau Tempo no Canal (1944), which won the Ricardo Malheiros Literary Prize;

=== Dissertations and Critics ===
- Sob os Signos de Agora (1932)
- A Mocidade de Herculano (1934)
- Relações Francesas do Romantismo Português (1936)
- Ondas Médias (1945)
- Conhecimento de Poesia (1958)

=== Chronicles ===
- O Segredo de Ouro Preto (1954)
- Corsário das Ilhas (1956)
- Jornal do Observador (1974).

== Bibliography ==
- Garcia, J. M. (1978). Vitorino Nemésio, A Obra e o Homem. Arcadia.
- Silva, H. G. (1985). Açorianidade Na prosa de Vitorino Nemésio − Realidade, Poesia e Mito. I. N. C. M., Lisbon.
- Roza, E. F. (2002). Poder, Tradição e Utopia: Nemésio e a Autonomia dos Açores. Boletim do Instuto Histórico da Ilha Terceira, Praia da Vitória.
- Vitorino Nemésio and the Azores. Portuguese Literary & Cultural Studies. 2002. ISBN 1-933227-09-5.
