= Maria (magazine) =

Portuguese women's magazine

- Categories: Women's magazine
- Frequency: Weekly
- Circulation: 145,420 (2016)
- Publisher: Impala Sociedade Editorial SA
- Founded: 1978; 47 years ago
- Company: Impala
- Country: Portugal
- Based in: Queluz, Lisbon
- Language: Portuguese
- Website: Maria

Maria is a weekly women's magazine published in Queluz, Lisbon, Portugal. It has been in circulation since 1978 and is among the highest circulation publications in the country.

== History and profile ==
Maria was established in 1978. Its headquarters is in Queluz, Lisbon. The magazine is part of the Impala Group, which also owns Nova Gente, a celebrity magazine. Maria is published by Impala Sociedade Editorial SA on a weekly basis.

In 2007 Maria sold 243,000 copies. In 2010 the magazine had a circulation of 203,817 copies. It fell to 201,063 copies in 2011 and 190,826 copies in 2012. Between September and October 2013 the magazine sold 177,770 copies. The circulation of Maria was 145,420 copies in 2016 making it the highest circulated publication in the country.

== See also ==
- List of magazines in Portugal
