= A Leitura =

Portuguese literary magazine

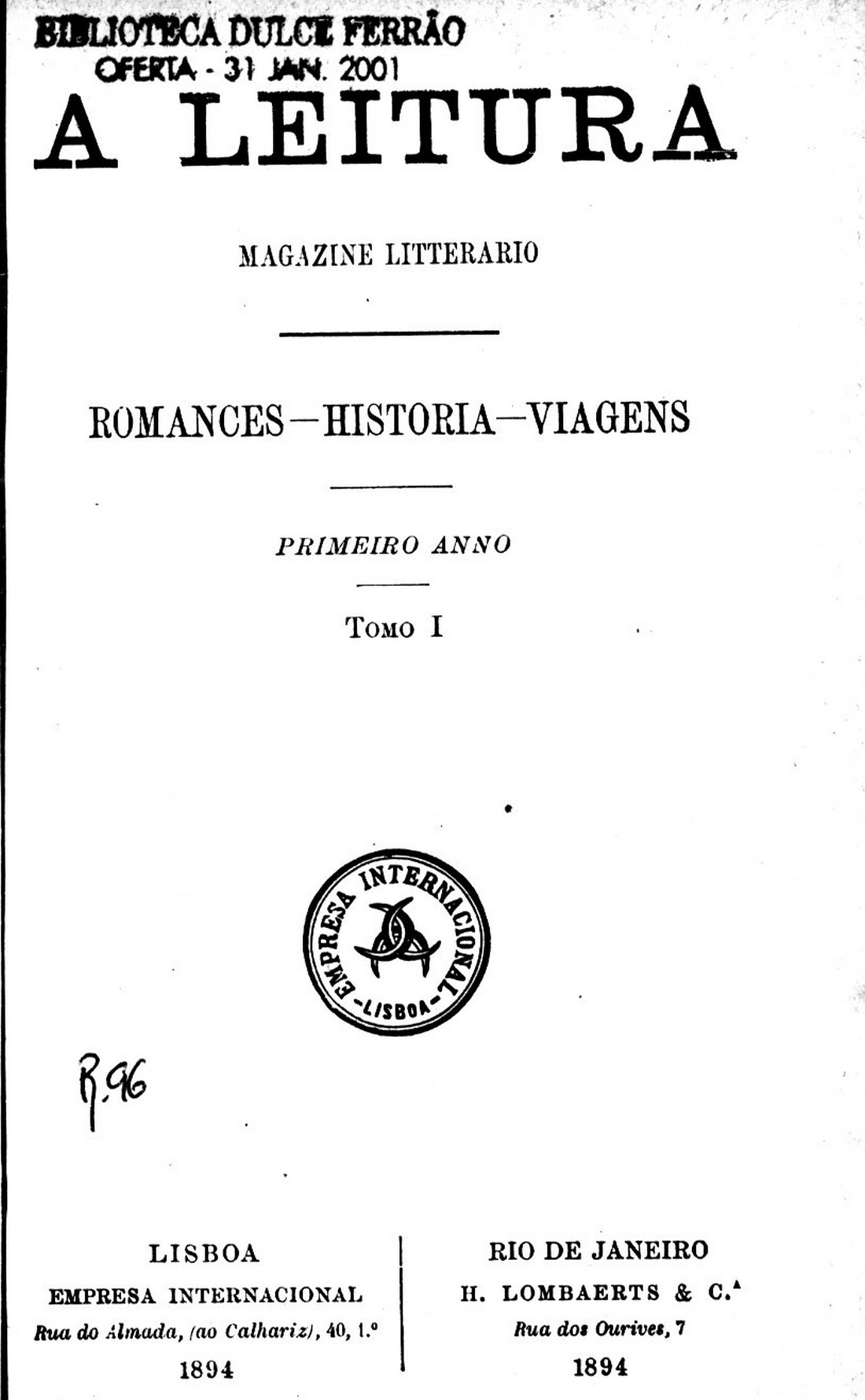
- Cover of Volume I published in 1894.
- Categories: Literary magazine
- Format: Review; 20 cm
- Founded: 1894
- Final issue: 1896
- Country: Portugal
- Based in: Lisbon
- Language: Portuguese

A Leitura: magazine literário (Portuguese for "The Letter: a Literary Magazine") was a review published in Lisbon, Portugal, from 1894 to 1896 which featured different genres including novels, short stories, novellas, histories, memories and theatre. The publication was read in its text by contributed greatest authors from the country and abroad including (the title with examples that refer to its authors in Volume IV): Olivieira Martins, Guiomar Torresão, Émile Zola, Mark Twain Guy de Maupassant, Leo Tolstoy, Edmundo de Amicis, Caetano da Costa Alegre from São Tomé and Príncipe and others.

== See also ==
- List of magazines in Portugal
