= Amélia Janny =

Portuguese poet (1842–1914)

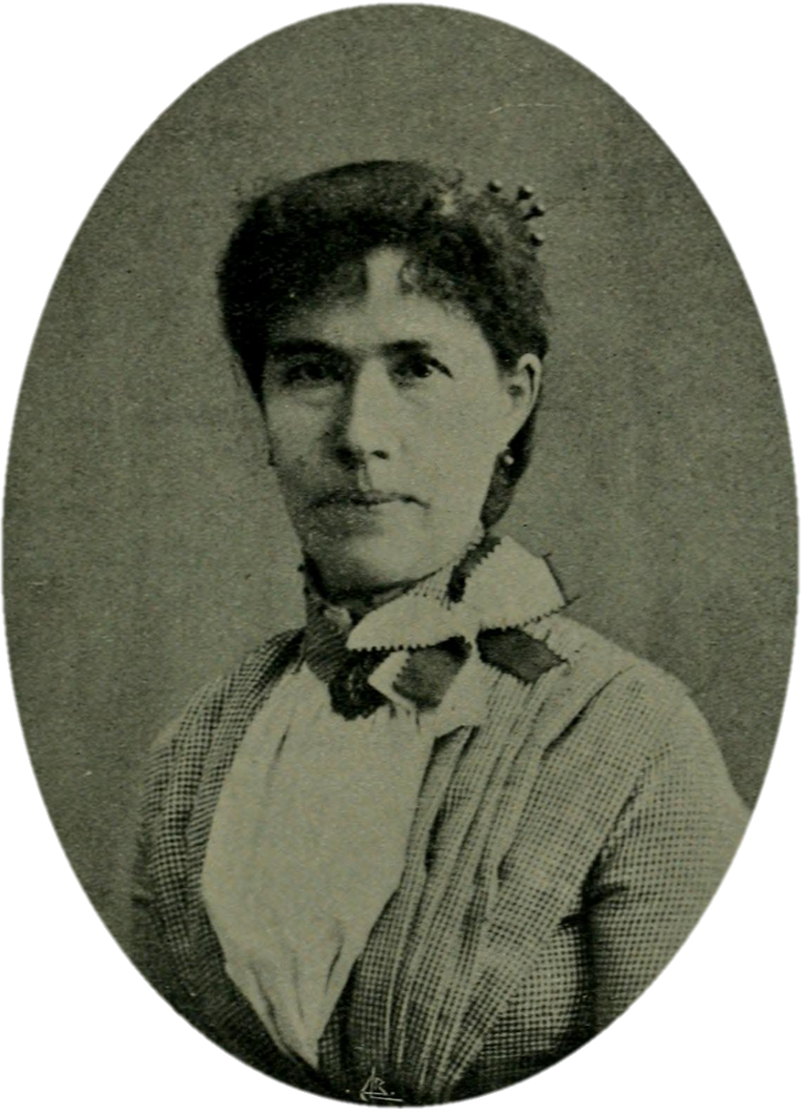
- Born: 25 February 1842; Coimbra, Portugal
- Died: 19 March 1914 (aged 72); Coimbra, Portugal
- Occupation: Poet

Amélia Janny (25 February 1842 – 19 March 1914) was a Portuguese Parnassian poet, playwright and lyricist who was highly regarded by, among others, the Portuguese writers and poets, Teixeira de Pascoaes and António Feliciano de Castilho.

== Early life ==
Janny was born on 25 February 1841. She was the illegitimate daughter of Maria Herculana da Silva e Veiga, a schoolgirl, and of the jurist, politician and academic, António Correia Caldeira (1815–1876), who was a nephew and heir of the Portuguese cardinal, Francisco de São Luís. Janny's father was, at the time of her birth, a student at the University of Coimbra and she was born in Coimbra. Her mother later married the doctor, Raimundo Francisco da Gama, who became her stepfather. Janny would later dedicate poems to him and write one about him, called "The Doctor".

From a very young age she demonstrated an unusual tendency towards writing poetry, writing her first poem at the age of four. She had been accepted into literary circles by the time she was 14, being introduced by the poet Rodrigues Cordeiro to Feliciano de Castilho, who then introduced her to the intellectual circles of Coimbra. Much admired by other poets she was even presented with a pen portrait by the noted artist Columbano Bordalo Pinheiro.

== Subsequent achievements ==
From the 1860s onwards, Janny became a central figure in the academic and cultural life of Coimbra, as a poet, an author of plays and fado lyrics (accompanying singers on the piano), and as a lecturer to organizations such as the Coimbra Institute and the Association of Artists of Coimbra. She published her first poems at the age of 16 and these were later republished in the local newspaper, Cysne do Mondego. She excelled in poetry reading, and came to enjoy considerable social prestige. A notable reading was during the Camões Centenary celebrations, in 1880, when she recited poetry at the former Teatro Académico de Coimbra, presenting her work entitled Pátria.

Janny became known for hosting literary soirées at her home in Coimbra. She contributed poems and other works to several magazines, including Ave Azul (1899–1900), A Mulher (1879), Ribaltas e Gambiarras (1881), and A Semana de Lisboa (1893–1895) as well as in the weekly Azulejos (1907–1909). She was awarded prizes in several literary competitions and was awarded the necklace of the Institute of Coimbra. She was a member of several academies and associations, including some in Brazil. In 2003, Coimbra City Council published her complete works in a collection entitled Amélia Janny: Miscelânea Poética.

== Death ==
Janny died in Coimbra on 19 March 1914. Coimbra subsequently named a road after her. A street also bears her name in the Seixal municipality.
