= Luís de Sttau Monteiro =

Portuguese writer, novelist and playwright

- Born: 3 April 1926; Lisbon, Portugal
- Died: 27 July 1993 (aged 67); Lisbon, Portugal
- Occupations: Playwright, novelist

Luís Infante de la Cerda de Sttau Monteiro (3 April 1926 – 27 July 1993) was a Portuguese writer, novelist and playwright.

== Life ==
Monteiro was born and died in Lisbon, Portugal. When he was ten years old, he went to London, accompanying his father, Armindo Monteiro, who was serving as the Portuguese ambassador to the United Kingdom. He returned to Portugal in 1943, after his father was removed from his position by António Salazar.

He graduated from the University of Lisbon with a degree in law and worked as a lawyer for a short time. At this time he met his future wife, June Elizabeth Goodyear, and got married. Subsequently, he returned to London, where he worked as a journalist. He came into contact with contemporary English literature and decided to become a writer. He also developed an interest in Formula 2 racing, a hobby that he would pursue for the rest of his life.

When he went back to Portugal, he wrote for the magazine Almanaque (under the Name "Manuel Pedrosa") and A Mosca, a supplement of the Diário de Lisboa. In 1960, he published his first novel Um Homem não Chora (A Man Doesn't Cry). In 1961, he received the Grand Prize from the Sociedade Portuguesa de Autores for his play Felizmente Há Luar! (Fortunately, There is Moonlight!), although it could not be performed due to the censorship laws.

He was arrested in 1962, on suspicion of participating in the Revolta de Beja, but was released. As a result, he once again went to England and lived there until 1967. Upon his return, he was immediately arrested again, by PIDE (the internal security agency), on the grounds that he had written theatrical pieces satirizing Salazar and the Colonial War.

Following the Carnation Revolution (in 1974), some of his plays were presented for the first time by the D. Maria II National Theatre. He continued to contribute to periodicals, notably Expresso. A lifelong heavy smoker, he died of cerebral embolism, aged 67.

Luis and June had four children: Carolina Goodyear de Sttau Monteiro, Ana Lucia Goodyear de Sttau Monteiro, Diogo Goodyear de Sttau Monteiro and Tomas Goodyear de Sttau Monteiro.

In 1994, he was posthumously awarded the Military Order of Saint James of the Sword.

== Bibliography ==
Prose

- Um Homem não Chora (1960)
- Angústia para o Jantar (1961) In English: Rules of the Game (Knopf) or A Man of Means (Putnam); literally Anguish for Dinner, translated by Ann Stevens
- E se for Rapariga Chama-se Custódia (1966)
- Redacções da Guidinha (1971)

Plays

- Felizmente há Luar! (1961)
- Todos os Anos, pela Primavera (1963)
- O Barão (1965, theatrical adaptation of the novella by Branquinho da Fonseca)
- Auto da Barca do Motor fora da Borda (1966)
- A Guerra Santa (1967)
- A Estátua (1967)
- As Mãos de Abraão Zacut (1968)
- Sua Excelência (1971)
- Crónica Aventurosa do Esperançoso Fagundes (1979)
