= Raul Brandão =

Portuguese writer and journalist (1867–1930)

Raul Germano Brandão
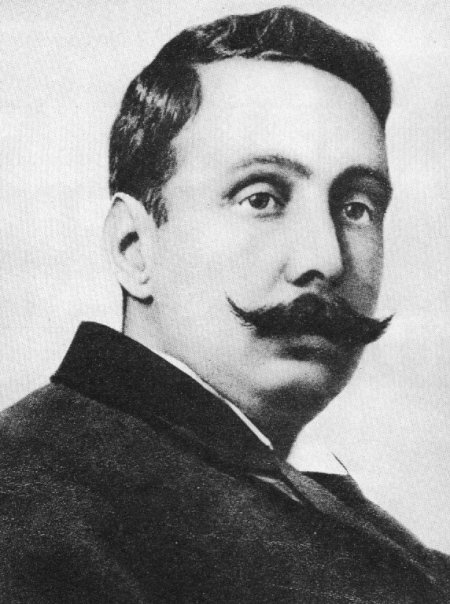
- Born: 12 March 1867; Porto, Portugal
- Died: 5 December 1930 (aged 63); Lisbon, Portugal
- Occupations: Writer, journalist and military officer

Raul Germano Brandão (12 March 1867 in Foz do Douro, Porto – 5 December 1930 in Lisbon) was a Portuguese writer, journalist and military officer, notable for the realism of his literary descriptions and for the lyricism of his language. Brandão was born in Foz do Douro, a parish of Porto, where he spent the majority of his youth. Born in a family of sailors, the ocean and the sailors are recurring themes in his work.

== Biography ==
Brandão completed his secondary studies in 1891. After that, he joined the military academy, where he initiated a long career in the Ministry of War. While working in the ministry, he also worked as a journalist and published several books.

In 1896, Brandão was commissioned in Guimarães, where he would meet his future wife. He married in the next year and settled in the city. Despite living in Guimarães, Brandão spent long periods in Lisbon. After retiring from the army, in 1912, Brandão initiated the most productive period of his writing career. He died on 5 December 1930, age 63, after a lifetime of writing and publishing.

== As Ilhas Desconhecidas ==
In 1924 Brandão travelled by ship from Lisbon to Madeira and all nine islands of the Azores; part of the voyage was shared with the young Vitorino Nemésio, with whom he kept up a correspondence. His impressions were published in 1926 as As Ilhas Desconhecidas: Notas e Paisagens ("The Unknown Islands: Notes and Landscapes"). Architect and researcher Celina Vale describes the book as offering "a mainland perspective" on Azorean identity, complementary to Nemésio's novel Mau Tempo no Canal, and highlights its atmospheric images of the archipelago, such as the "faded sea that was not made to be seen but rather to be breathed".

== Published works ==
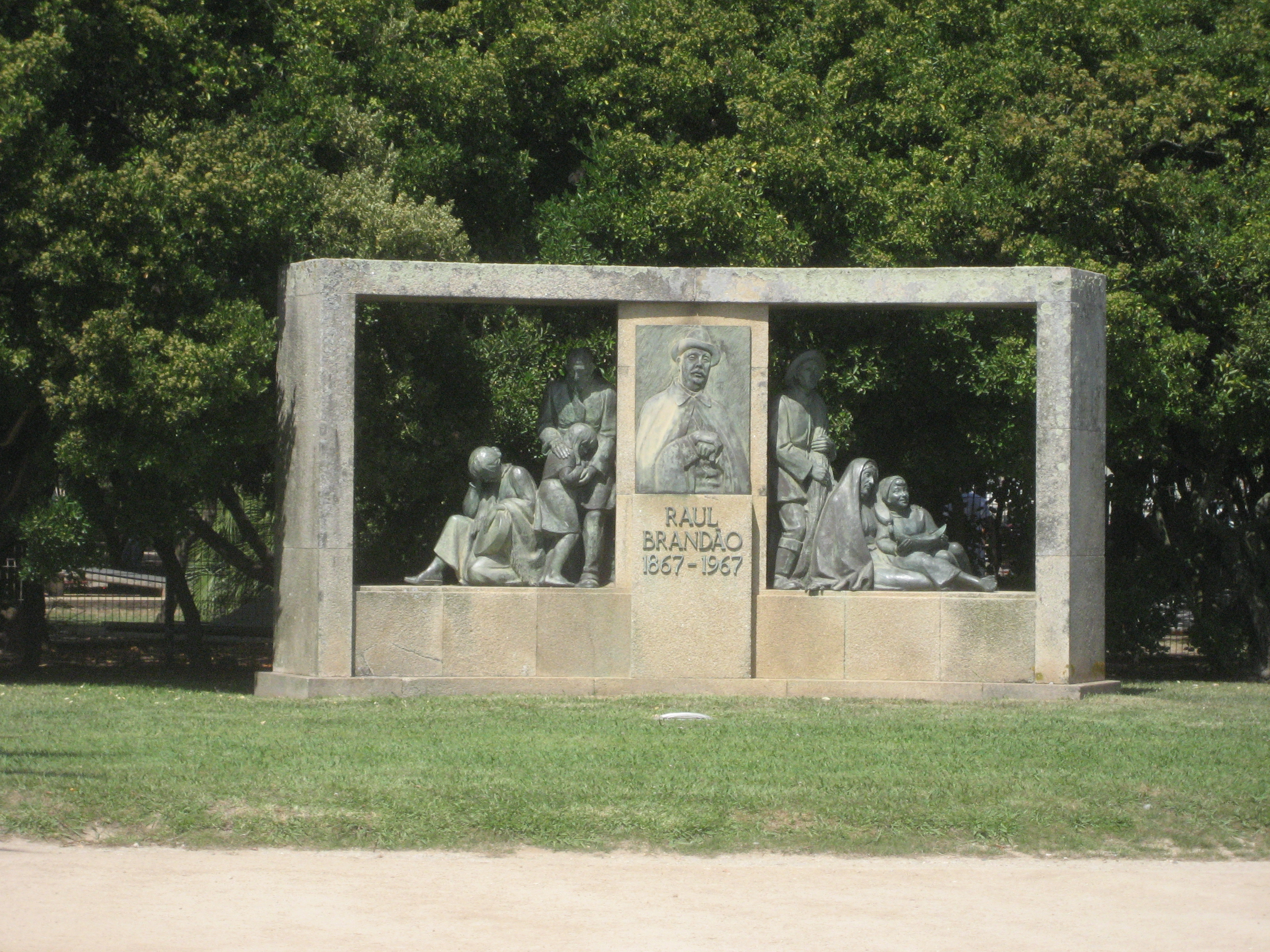
Raul Brandão by Henrique Moreira (Porto)

- 1890 - Impressões e Paisagens
- 1896 - História de um Palhaço
- 1901 - O Padre
- 1903 - A Farsa
- 1906 - Os Pobres (The Poor, trans. Karen Sotelino. Dalkey Archive Press, 2016)
- 1912 - El-Rei Junot
- 1914 - A Conspiração de 1817
- 1917 - Húmus (1917)
- 1919 - Memórias (vol. I)
- 1923 - Teatro
- 1923 - Os Pescadores
- 1924 - "A Pesca da Baleia"
- 1925 - Memórias (vol. II)
- 1926 - As Ilhas Desconhecidas
- 1926 - A Morte do Palhaço e o Mistério da Árvore
- 1927 - Jesus Cristo em Lisboa, with Teixeira de Pascoaes
- 1929 - O Avejão
- 1930 - Portugal Pequenino, with Maria Angelina Brandão
- 1931 - O Pobre de Pedir
- 1933 - Vale de Josafat
