= Exame Informática =

- Categories: Computer magazine
- Frequency: Monthly
- First issue: June 1995
- Company: Trust in News (TIN)
- Country: Portugal
- Based in: Lisbon
- Language: Portuguese
- Website: www.exameinformatica.pt

Exame Informática is a Portuguese monthly computer magazine published in Portugal.

== History and profile ==
Exame Informática was first published in June 1995. The magazine was published monthly by Medipress Publishing. In 2018, Portuguese company Trust in News (TIN) acquired the magazine. The magazine is based in Lisbon.

It is an information technology magazine, and every month is accompanied by a CD or a DVD (as purchased or signed).

In 2007, Exame Informática had a circulation of 34,000 copies.

== See also ==
- List of magazines in Portugal
