= Nova Gente =

Portuguese celebrity magazine

- Categories: Celebrity magazine; Society magazine
- Frequency: Weekly
- Founded: 1976; 50 years ago
- Company: Impala
- Country: Portugal
- Based in: Lisbon
- Language: Portuguese
- Website: Nova Gente

Nova Gente is a weekly celebrity and society magazine published in Queluz, Lisbon, Portugal. The magazine has been in circulation since 1976.

== History and profile ==
Nova Gente was established in 1976. The magazine is the successor of Flama, another Portuguese tabloid magazine. Nova Gente is part of the Impala Group, which also owns Maria, a women's magazine. Jacques Rodrigues is the owner of the company which also publishes Nova Gente on a weekly basis. The headquarters of Nova Gente is in Queluz, Lisbon.

Nova Gente is a tabloid publication and offers society/celebrity-related content for adult women.

Humberto Simões is one of the former editors-in-chief of Nova Gente.

== Circulation ==
Nova Gente sold 185,000 copies between January and September 2000. In 2003 the circulation of the magazine was about 200,000 copies.

Its circulation was 144,000 copies in 2007, making it the best-selling magazine in its category in Portugal. The weekly sold 127,728 copies in 2010 and 121,231 copies in 2011. The circulation of the magazine was 112,753 copies in 2012. Between September and October 2013 it was 101,175 copies.

== See also ==
- List of magazines in Portugal
