= Portugal Socialista =

Political magazine in Portugal

Portugal Socialista (also known as Orgão Central do Partido Socialista) is a Portuguese language quarterly magazine published in Lisbon, Portugal. The magazine is the organ of Socialist Party.

== History and profile ==
Portugal Socialista was established in 1967. The publication was started as a weekly newspaper and was published illegally. It is official media outlet of the Socialist Party. It became a monthly magazine in 1977. Then the magazine began to be published on a quarterly basis. It has its headquarters in Lisbon. Pedro Delgado Alves, a member of the Portuguese parliament for the Socialist Party, is the director of the magazine.

== See also ==
- List of magazines in Portugal
