= Grande Reportagem =

News magazine in Portugal (1984–2005)

- Categories: News magazine
- Frequency: Weekly; Monthly
- First issue: 7 December 1984
- Final issue: December 2005
- Country: Portugal
- Based in: Lisbon
- Language: Portuguese

Grande Reportagem was a news magazine published in Lisbon, Portugal, between 1984 and 2005 with some interruptions.

== History and profile ==
Grande Reportagem was first published as a weekly on 7 December 1984. The founding company was Reporpress and the magazine was edited by José Manuel Barata-Feyo. The headquarters of the weekly was in Lisbon. On 15 June 1985 the magazine folded.

The magazine was restarted by Publications Don Quixote in December 1989. José Manuel Barata-Feyo again edited the magazine. At the early 1990s Miguel Sousa Tavares became its editor. From October 1991 the magazine began to be published on a monthly basis. In 2000 Francisco José Viegas was appointed editor of the monthly.

On 29 November 2003 Grande Reportagem changed its frequency to weekly and became a supplement of the dailies Diário de Notícias and Jornal de Notícias. During this period the magazine was part of Controlinveste. In December 2005 the magazine ceased publication.

== Circulation ==
The circulation of Grande Reportagem was 26,760 copies in 1999 and 21,006 copies in 2000. It dropped to 19,985 copies in 2001.

== See also ==
- List of magazines in Portugal
