= António Pedro =

Portuguese painter, potter, journalist, and writer

António Pedro da Costa (9 December 1909, in Portuguese Cape Verde, Santiago, Praia – 17 August 1966, in Caminha, Moledo, Portugal) was a Portuguese painter, potter, journalist, and writer.

== Biography ==
He was born to a prominent colonial family from the Cape Verde Islands, son of José Maria da Costa (b. Lisbon, c. 1870) and wife Elizabeth Savage de Paula Rosa. However, his maternal grandmother was Irish and English, and he cited this influence of the "Celtic spirit" as an influence in his work. In addition, because his family spoke English, and sent their children to English schools, he was able to work as a journalist with the BBC in London between 1944 and 1945.

He moved to Portugal when he was four. Later, he attended Liceu Pedro Nunes in Lisbon for two years and afterwards attended Nuno Álvares Institute, Companhia de Jesus in A Guarda, Galicia, Spain, his sixth year was in Santarém, Coimbra's lyceum, during his seventh year where he wrote the journal O Bicho. He attended the University of Lisbon, having attended at the Faculty of Directors and Letters and did not finished his courses. He lived in Paris between 1934 and 1935 and went to study at the Institute of Arts and Archaeology at the University of Sorbonne where he signed the Manifeste Dimensioniste (Dimensionist Manifest). Some of his poems and writings were its origins and elements that would create a Cape Verdean review related to anti-colonialism titled Claridade in 1936. He created the Galeria UP in 1933, which existed up to 1936. It showcased the first expo by Maria Helena Vieira da Silva in Portugal in 1935.

He was one of the pioneers of Surrealism in Portuguese painting in the late 1930s. Its official start is set to be the exposition he held with António Dacosta and Pamela Boden in Lisbon in 1940.

Afterwards, he visited Brazil in 1941 and exhibited his paintings in the then capital city of Rio de Janeiro and São Paulo.

He directed the editorship of the review Variante, he published two editions in 1942 and 1943, he took part in the seminary Mundo Literário (World Literature) from 1946 to 1948.

Pedro paintings show the influence of the great surrealist painters, like Giorgio de Chirico, Max Ernst, and Salvador Dalí. He was a founding member of the Portuguese Surrealist Group, in 1947, along with Cândido Costa Pinto, who shortly left, Marcelino Vespeira, Fernando de Azevedo, and Mário Cesariny, but he left painting short time after.

He dedicated himself to pottery and theater for the rest of his life. His theatrical appearances included the Teatro Apolo in Lisbon in 1949 and at the Teatro Experimental do Porto (Porto Experimental Theatre) in 1953 and in 1961.

He was also a Freemason and an active anti-fascist militant.

He married Maria Manuela Possante, without issue.

He lived his last year in Moledo, a beach near Caminha.

== Legacy ==
One of his poems can be found on the CD Poesia de Cabo Verde e Sete Poemas de Sebastião da Gama by Afonso Dias.

== Literary works ==
=== Poetic works ===
- Os meus 7 pecados (1926)
- Ledo Encanto (1927)
- Distância, Canções de António Pedro (1928)
- Devagar (1929)
- Diário (Diaries) (1929)
- Máquina de Vidro (1931)
- A Cidade, Oficinas gráficas UP, Separata da "Página Literária" (1932) about the 16 June Revolution
- 15 Poémes a hasard (1956)
- Primeiro Volume (First Volume) (1936)
- Onze poemas líricos de exaltação e o folhetim (Eleven Poems) (1938)
- Casa de Campo (The House of Fields) (1938)
- Protopoema da Serra d'Arga (Early Poems of Serra d'Arga) (1949)
- "Invocação para um poema marítimo", ("Innovation on Maritime Poems") (1951)

=== Other works ===
- The Dimensionist Manifesto (1936) [António Pedro assina, com outros autores, a primeira (movemental) edition do Manifesto]
- Desimaginação (1937)
- Grandeza e virtudes da Arte Moderna (Greatest Virtues on Modern Art) (1939)
- Apenas uma narrativa (1942)
- Teatro (1947)
- Andam Ladrões cé em Casa (1950)
- Martírios de fingimento (1952)
- Pequeno Tratado de Encenação (1962)
- Teatro completo (1981), posthumous work, introduction by Luiz Francisco Rebello
- Nana de noche (2012), posthumous work

== Potteries, paintings and other plastic works ==
- Le Crachat Embelli (1934)
- Poema no espaço (Poems Without a Space) (object) (1935)
- Aparelho metafísico de meditação (object) (1935)
- Transmissão (Transmission) (1935)
- Dança de roda (1936)
- O Anjo da guarda (1939)
- O Avejão lírico (1939)
- Transmissão (Transmission) (1939)
- Ilha do cão (Island of Dogs or the Isle of Dogs) (1940)
- Intervenção romântica (Romantic Invervention) (1940)
- Madrugada (1940)
- Nós dois no Brasil (1940)
- Tríptico solto de Moledo (1943)
- A Fantastic Figure and Animal in an Interior (1944)
- Rapto na paisagem povoada (1946)
- O Amanhecer das virgens (1948)
- Duas esculturas de bronze (Two Bronze Sculptures) (1952) - no title
- Três esculturas de cerâmica (Three Ceramic Sculptures) (1955) - no title
