= António Soares =

Portuguese footballer (1909–?)

Personal information
- Date of birth: 2 February 1909
- Place of birth: Portugal
- Position: Forward

Senior career*
Years	Team	Apps	(Gls)
- Porto

International career
1931	Portugal	1	(0)
- * Club domestic league appearances and goals

António Soares (born 2 February 1909, date of death unknown) was a Portuguese footballer who played as a forward.
