= O Diabo (1977) =

Portuguese weekly newspaper

O Diabo is a Portuguese weekly newspaper, broadly considered right-wing. It was founded on 10 February 1976, by Maria Armanda Falcão, known by the pen name Vera Lagoa. The headquarters of the paper is in Lisbon. In 2019, the paper shifted from publishing on Tuesdays to Fridays.

The newspaper is named for O Diabo, an anti-Salazar weekly published in Portugal in the 1930s.

O Diabo was suspended for several months by the Revolutionary Council during the Processo Revolucionário em Curso, resuming publication on February 16, 1977. For legal reasons, that date of founding appears on the newspaper's nameplate rather than the earlier one.
