= Azulejos (journal) =

- Staff writers: Palermo de Faria
- Categories: Cultural magazine
- Founded: 1907
- First issue: September 1907
- Final issue: February 1909
- Country: Portugal
- Based in: Lisbon
- Language: Portuguese

Azulejos : Semanário Ilustrado de Ciências, Letras e Artes (Portuguese for "Tiles: Weekly Illustrations of Sciences, Arts and Letters") was a review published in Lisbon, Portugal from September 1907 to February 1909. Five series of fifteen issues were published.

The periodical was advertised as a journal open to all authors, but especially those who were as yet unknown, since the magazine specialized in promoting new writing talent. Subjects published varied from sporting life to spiritualism.

Its head was Palermo de Faria, and the editorial team included Anacleto Oliveira, Bento Mântua, Xavier da Silva, Luís Cebola, Aarão de Lacerda, and Alfredo Mantua. Many of the "new talents" which took part in its journal publication later became well-known writers in Portugal, including Mário de Sá Carneiro, Abel Botelho, Amélia Janny, Astrigildo Chaves, Augusto Casimiro, Guerra Junqueiro, João de Câmara, João de Freitas Branco, Júlio Dantas, Olavo Bilac and a few texts, were published posthumously, including those by Alexandre Herculano, Bocage, Camilo Castelo Branco and João de Deus.
