= Cape Verdean people in São Tomé and Príncipe =

There are 186,817 people residing in São Tomé and Príncipe according to a 2013 estimate published in the CIA World Factbook. Of these, Cape Verdeans and their descendants make up about 3,000 people. They account for more than half of the 6,000 strong population of the island of Príncipe, which in turn accounts for only about 5% of the total population. Most of the Cape Verdeans in the island nation live in poverty.

== Migration history ==
São Tomé was discovered in the 1470s by Portuguese explorers and subsequently became a slave port. When slavery was abolished in 1875, contract labor from Angola, Mozambique, Cape Verde and other parts of the Portuguese Empire were recruited. These laborers were called "serviçais". Thus, most Cape Verdean nationals were taken to São Tomé as serviçais. The children of these contract laborers who were born on the island nation are called "tongas". On the island of Príncipe, serviçais and tongas have settled permanently on government-allotted land. After independence in 1975, most of the Cape Verdeans returned to Cape Verde. The song Sodade refers to these people.

== Notable people ==
- Fernando "Cobo" Pereira, of Cape Verdean and Angolan descent, who led a coup in the country.
