= Centauro (review) =

- Staff writers: Luís de Montalvor
- Categories: Review
- Founded: October 1916
- Final issue: December 1916
- Country: Portugal, Portuguese Empire
- Based in: Lisbon
- Language: Portuguese

Centauro (Portuguese for "centaur") was a Portuguese monthly literary review published in the capital Lisbon from October to December 1916. The review was headed by Luís de Montalvor who also published its first volume. The first volume was published in October 1916, the second in November and the last one in December.

== Decadentism ==
In some form, the Centauro review was republished as part of the review Orpheu (Orpheus), whose titled as a trimonthly literary review which had the recovering a then current decadentist, that Luís de Montalvor who headed the first issue of the review, it was printed. But the then current literary was diverted to the futurism, intersectionism and sensationism of Fernando Pessoa and Mário de Sá-Carneiro, especially on the second issue, in which it substituted the founded to head the Orpheus review.

For its first issue of the Orpheu (also as Orféu), de Montalvor wrote an "introduction", finding to make an aesthetic orientation of the review. However, the text was confusing, translated its differences of its young writers. The only number of the Centauro review opens with a "Tentative of an essay on Decadence", and that de Montalvor was more explicit, although it remains anchored in aesthetic values of the 19th century, especially that inspired by the Belgian writer Maurice Maeterlinck.

== Notable collaborators ==
This review published 16 poems by one of the Portuguese great at the time Camilo Pessanha, republished in 1920 in the book Clepsidra, considered the most pure expression of symbolism in Portugal. It had contributed to the review by Alberto Osório de Castro with "Quatro Secos", Raul Leau with "A Aventura de um Satyro (Satiro) ou a Morte de Adonis" ("The Adventure of a Satyr on the Death of Adonis"., Júlio de VIlhena with "Ultima Nau", Silva Tavares with "Poems de Alma Doente" and the Portuguese great at the time Fernando Pessoa with 14 sonnets of "Passo de Cruz".

== See also ==
- Portugal Futurista (Futurist Portugal)
