= Abel Botelho =

Portuguese military officer, writer and diplomat

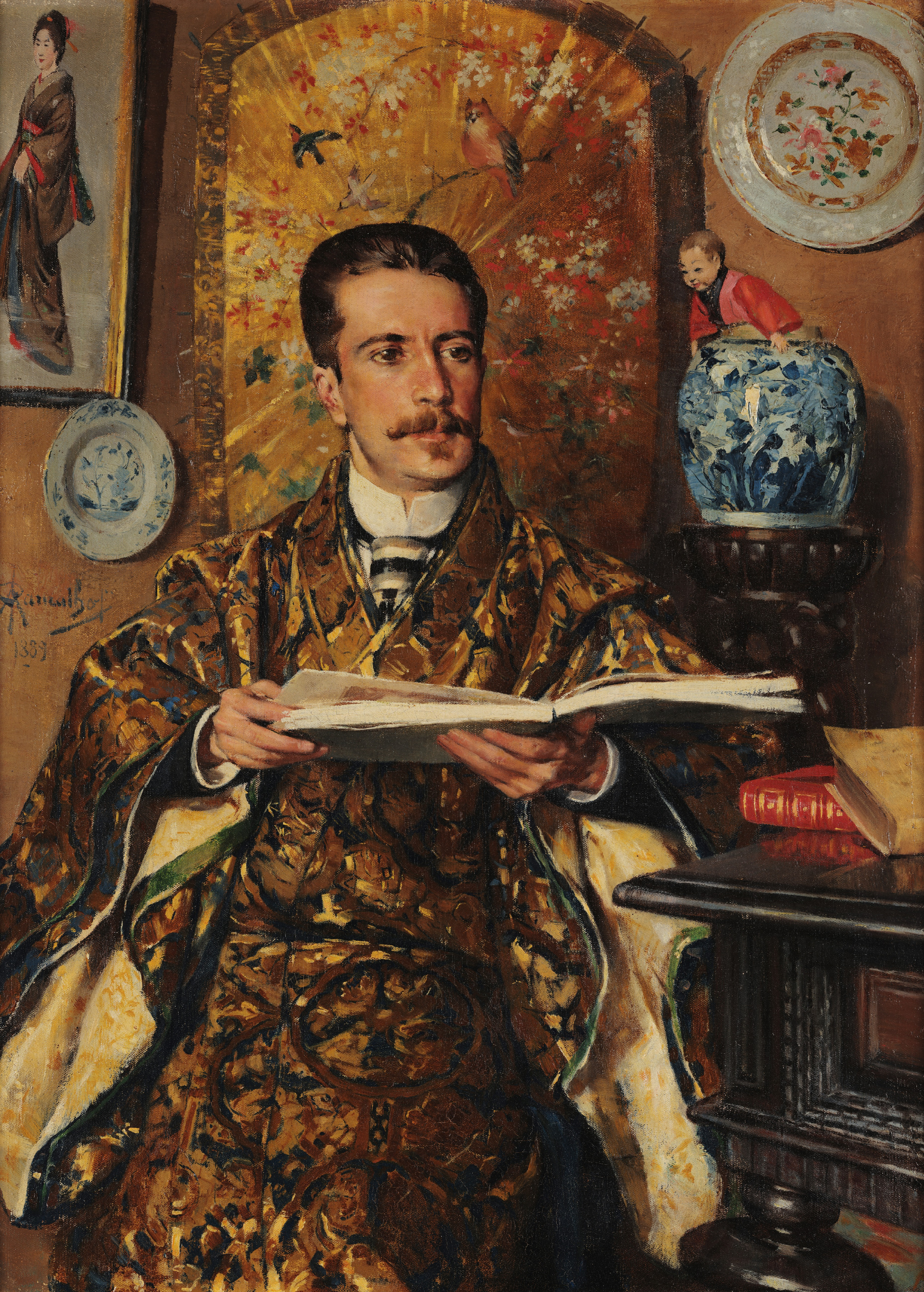
- Born: Abel Acácio de Almeida Botelho; 23 September 1855/1856; Tabuaço, Portugal
- Died: 24 April 1917 (aged 59–61); Buenos Aires, Argentina
- Occupations: Diplomat; writer; general; politician; journalist; playwright; novelist; historian

Abel Acácio de Almeida Botelho (European Portuguese: [ɐˈβɛl ɐˈkasju ð(ɨ) alˈmɐjðɐ βuˈteʎu];23 September 1855 or 1856 – 1917), was a Portuguese military officer and diplomat who distinguished himself as a writer. A representative of Naturalism in Portugal, he wrote, among others, O Barão de Lavos and O Livro de Alda, the first two titles in his "Patologia Social" series. In 1911, he took part in the commission that selected and approved the draft of what would become the current flag of Portugal.

== Biography ==
Botelho was born in Tabuaço, a small town in Portugal's Douro region, son of Luís Carlos de Almeida Botelho, an infantry major and a high school teacher in Vila Real and Maria Preciosa de Azevedo Leitão, a mother descendant of wealthy farmers. His father had intended him to attend a university course, but his premature death (Botelho lost his father at 12 years old) dictated another direction in the career of the young Abel.

As a teen he attended the Military College in Lisbon from 1867 to 1872, joining Escola Politécnica de Lisboa up until 1876. Between 1876 and 1878 he attended the General Staff course at the military academy, beginning in the arms career as a simple private soldier, he climbed the highest ranks of the army, having become a colonel. He married in 1881 to a lady of noble origin.

Among other functions, he served as chief of staff of the First Military Division (Lisbon). He belonged to several associations (Academy of Sciences, Association of Portuguese Journalists and Writers (both in Lisbon and Porto), Press Association, Geographical Society of Lisbon, presented in São Paulo in 1910 on the occasion of a Geography congress where he served as a delegate, among others).

In 1911 he was appointed Minister of Portugal in Buenos Aires, at that time a position of great importance to which some authors say it significantly contributed to Argentina being the first country to recognize the Portuguese Republic after the republican establishment in 1910.

He continued to work in the Ministry of Foreign Affairs as minister of the Portuguese Republic in Argentina up until his death in 1917 on the pinnacle of World War I.

== Literature ==
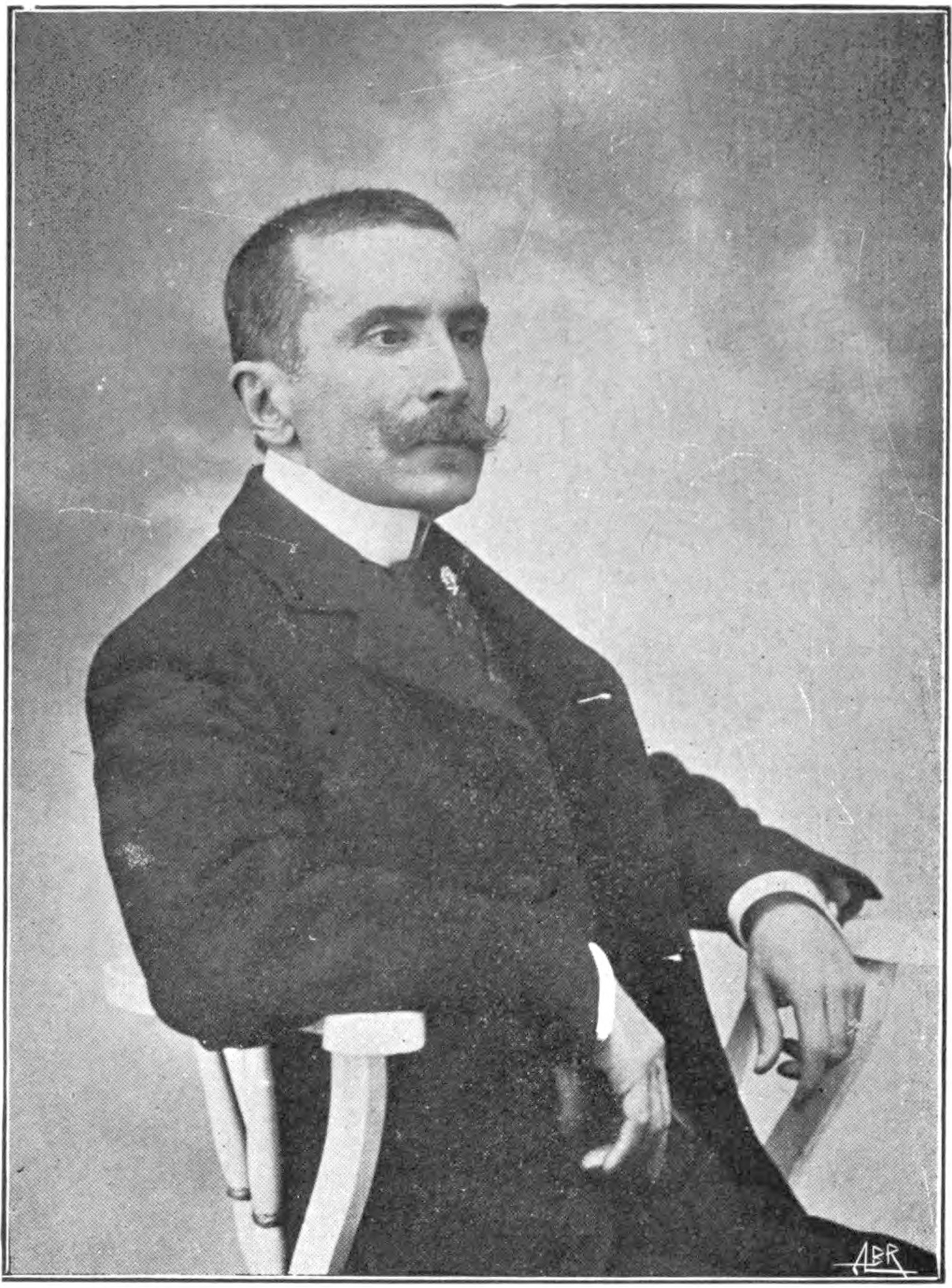
Botelho circa 1900

His literary career began in 1885, with a book of verses called Lira Insubmissa.

The following year, he released Germano, a drama in five acts, in verse. Proposed to the directorate of the National Theater, this play was refused. A controversy arose after Botelho wrote an article addressing those responsible for not accepting his play. From then on he wrote other plays: Jacunda (comedy in three acts; 1895), Claudina (comedy in three acts; performed at the Teatro do Príncipe Real in Lisbon, at the artistic party of actress Lucinda Simões, on 18 March 1890), Vencidos da Vida (satirical play, performed on March 23, 1892, at Teatro do Ginásio; three acts), Parnaso (lyrical play, in verse, in an act, written for the students' recital, for the benefit of Aid Box for Poor Students, held at the São Carlos Theater, on May 3, 1894), Fruta do Tempo (comedy, written for the actress Lucinda Simões; 1904).

Being of a generally scabrous, delicate subject, as Naturalism demanded, these pieces caused agitation, especially Imaculável, which ended in riots and crowds, and Vencidos da Vida, who could not continue on the scene for what contained criticism of the literary group of the same name, and for being considered immoral, creating a controversy between Botelho and those responsible for the ban.

In 1891, Abel Botelho began the study of Portuguese society in the series "Patologia Social", a demanding and scientific examination of the general bad that infested Portugal, especially Lisbon, the capital and the most prestigious urban center. The first book, O Barão de Lavos (1891) was supposedly the first novel in Portuguese with a homosexual plot. It was followed by O Livro de Alda (1898), Amanhã (1901), Fatal Dilema (1907) and Próspero Fortuna (1910). In addition to these, he left three more novels: Sem Remédio... (1900), Os Lázaros (1904), and Amor Crioulo (incomplete and posthumous; previously titled Idílio Triste; 1919) and the short story Mulheres da Beira (1898; previously published on Diário de Notícias between 1895 and 1896, and which served as inspiration for the 1921 film of the same name). He also collaborated in several periodical publications, namely in the magazines Brasil-Portugal (1899–1914), Serões (1901–1911), Azulejos (1907–1909) and Atlântida (1915–1920).
