= Agostinho da Silva =

Portuguese writer (1906 - 1994)

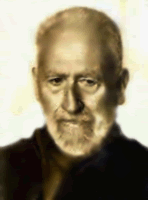
- Digital painting of Agostinho da Silva
- Born: 13 February 1906; Porto, Portugal
- Died: 3 April 1994 (aged 88); Lisbon, Portugal
- Occupations: Philosopher; essayist; writer

George Agostinho Baptista da Silva, GCSE (Portuguese pronunciation: [ɐɣuʃˈtiɲu ðɐ ˈsilvɐ]; Porto, 13 February 1906 – Lisbon, 3 April 1994) was a Portuguese philosopher, essayist, and writer. His thought combines elements of pantheism and millenarism, an ethic of renunciation (like in Buddhism or Franciscanism), and a belief in freedom as the most important feature of man. Anti-dogmatic, he asserts that truth is only found in the sum of all conflicting hypothesis (in paradox). He may be considered a practical philosopher, living and working for a change in society, according to his beliefs.

He is part of a tradition of visionary thought that includes Father António Vieira and the poets Luís de Camões and Fernando Pessoa. Like Joachim de Fiore, he speaks of the coming of an age in History—the Age of the Holy Spirit—in which mankind and society attain perfection. To Agostinho da Silva, this means the absence of economy, brought about by technological evolution, and the absence of government. It also means that the nature of mankind and the nature of God will become the same. In this sense his philosophy is both an eschatology and an utopy.

== Biography ==
(translated and adapted from: Romana Brázio Valente, "Agostinho da Silva: Síntese Biográfica")

George Agostinho Baptista da Silva was born in Porto in 1906. Later that same year, he moved to Barca d'Alva (Figueira de Castelo Rodrigo), where he lived until about 6 years of age. From 1924 to 1928 he studied Classical Philology at the Faculdade de Letras of University of Porto. After graduation he began contributing to the Seara Nova magazine (a collaboration that continued until 1938).

From 1931, as a scholarship student, he attended Sorbonne and Collège de France (Paris). In 1933 he commenced teaching at Aveiro high school but was discharged in 1935 for refusing to sign a statement—then mandatory to all civil servants—which renounced participation in secret (thus subversive) organizations.

He created the Núcleo Pedagógico Antero de Quental in 1939, and in 1940 began publishing Iniciação: cadernos de informação cultural. He was arrested by the secret police in 1943 and left the country the following year.

He lived in Brazil from 1947 to 1969 due to his opposition to the authoritarian regime of the Estado Novo (New State). He taught at Faculdade Fluminense de Filosofia and collaborated with Jaime Cortesão in research about Alexandre de Gusmão (18th century diplomat). From 1952 to 1954 he taught at Federal University of Paraíba in João Pessoa and also in Pernambuco.

In 1954, again with Jaime Cortesão, he helped organize the 4th Centennial Exhibition of São Paulo. He was one of the founders of University of Santa Catarina, created the Centro de Estudos Afro-Orientais (Afro-Oriental Studies Center), taught Theater Philosophy at University of Bahia, and, in 1961, became an external policy adviser to the Brazilian president Jânio Quadros. He helped create the Universidade de Brasília and its Centro de Estudos Portugueses (Portuguese Studies Center), in 1962, and, two years later, created the Casa Paulo Dias Adorno in Cachoeira and idealizes the Museu do Atlântico Sul in Salvador.

He returned to Portugal in 1969 after Salazar's illness and replacement by Marcello Caetano, which created some political and cultural opening in the regime. He continued to write and teach at Portuguese universities. He directed the Centro de Estudos Latinoamericanos (Latin-American Studies Center) at Technical University of Lisbon, and acted as a consultant to Instituto de Cultura e Língua Portuguesa (ICALP, Portuguese Culture and Language Institute).

In 1990, the Portuguese public television channel RTP1 broadcast a series of thirteen interviews with him entitled Conversas Vadias. He died at São Francisco de Xavier Hospital in Lisbon in 1994.

A documentary entitled Agostinho da Silva: Um Pensamento Vivo, directed by João Rodrigues Mattos, was released by Alfândega Filmes, in 2004. There is an unreleased interview by António Escudeiro entitled Agostinho por Si Próprio, where he talks about the worship of the Holy Spirit.

He's revered as one of the leading Portuguese intellectual personalities of the 20th century. Among his works are biographies of Michelangelo, Pasteur and St. Francis of Assisi; his most influential book may be Sete Cartas a Um Jovem Filósofo (Seven Letters to a Young Philosopher).

He was a vegetarian.

== His Own Words ==
(translated from: Silva, Agostinho da, Educação de Portugal. Lisboa: Ulmeiro, 1989. ISBN 978-972-706-213-3)

a) "... that each man is different from myself and unique in the universe; that I am not the one, consequently, that must reflect instead of him, [...] that knows what is best for him, [...] that must point his way. Towards him I have only one right: helping him to be himself; as my essential duty to myself is being who I am, as uncomfortable as that may be [...]"

b) "... loving others and wanting their good has been the reason of much oppression and much death [...]; essentially, you must not love in others anything but freedom, theirs and yours. They must, for love, cease being slaves, as must we, for love, cease being slave owners."

c) "And it is the child the one that must be considered the noble savage, spoiling her, mis-shaping her [...] the least we possibly can [...]"

d) "Believing, thus, that man is born good, which means on my regard that he is born a brother to the world, not its owner and destroyer, I think that education [...] has not been much else than the system through which this fraternity is transformed in domination."

According to Agostinho da Silva, some of the most relevant aspects that shaped the nature of the Portuguese people and influenced the culture of Portuguese-speaking nations are: its popular religiousness, with strong elements of millenarism and mysticism; a tradition of participatory democracy and autonomy based on small local communities; a tendency towards cultural miscegenation and cosmopolitanism in balance with a nostalgia for the homeland and its cultural heritage; a slow and difficult adaptation to modernity, namely to Enlightenment ideas and capitalist economy.
