= Júlio Maria dos Reis Pereira =

Portuguese painter and poet (1902–1983)

Júlio ComIH
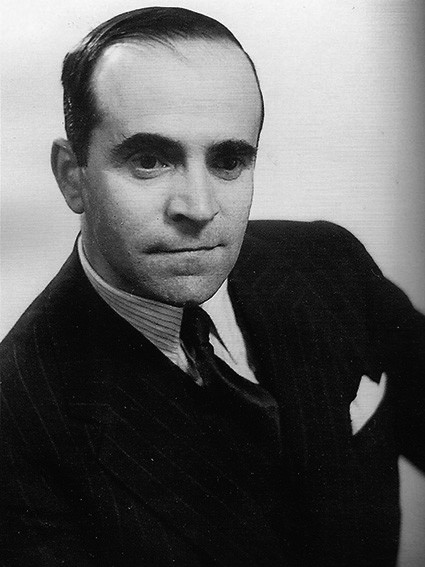
- Born: Júlio Maria dos Reis Pereira; 1 November 1902; Vila do Conde, Portugal
- Died: 17 January 1983 (aged 80); Vila do Conde, Portugal
- Education: Porto School of Fine Arts
- Alma mater: University of Porto
- Known for: Painting, drawing, writing
- Movement: Modernism
- Relatives: José Régio (brother)
- Writing career
- Pen name: Saul Dias

Júlio Maria dos Reis Pereira ComIH (1 November 1902 – 17 January 1983), was a Portuguese painter and poet. He is better known by the two pseudonyms he used: Júlio, as a painter; and Saul Dias as a poet. He was an important artist of the second generation of Portuguese Modernism. His art features a strong expression of lyricism and artistic explorations that could be connected with the expressionist and surrealist movements.

Júlio was the younger brother of writer José Régio, with whom he formed an artistic partnership his whole life, illustrating many of his books.
