= Delfim Santos =

Portuguese philosopher (1907–1966)

Delfim Pinto dos Santos
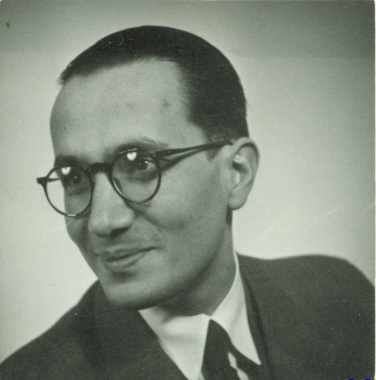
- Born: 6 November 1907; Oporto, Portugal
- Died: 25 September 1966 (aged 58); Cascais, Portugal

Philosophical work
- Era: 20th-century philosophy
- Region: Western philosophy
- School: Continental philosophy; onto-phenomenology
- Main interests: Philosophy of education; Ontology; Epistemology; History of philosophy - Greek, Western and Ph. in Portugal and Brazil
- Notable ideas: 'Pluriverse'; Regions of Reality; Philosophy as Aporia

Signature
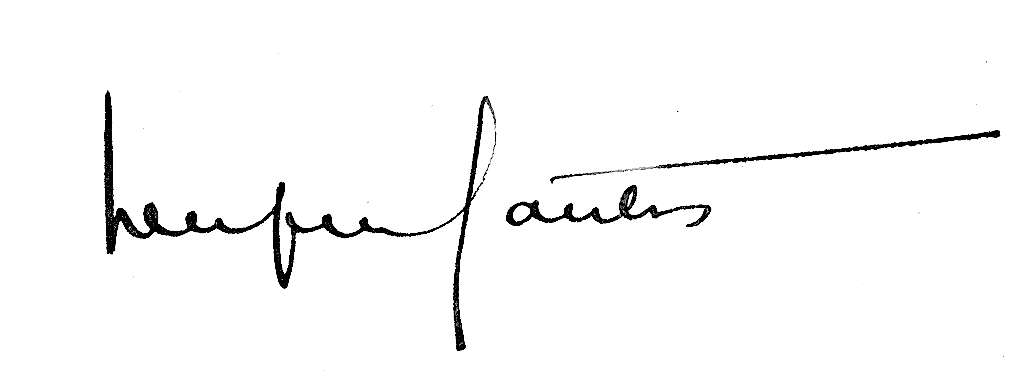

Delfim Pinto dos Santos (1907–1966), was a Portuguese academic, philosopher, educationist, essayist and book and movie reviewer.

== Life ==
Delfim Santos was born in Oporto, Portugal in 1907, to Arnaldo Pinto and Amelia dos Santos Oliveira. His father was a goldsmith and trained him for his craft, which Delfim successfully practiced as apprentice until Arnaldo's untimely death, occurred when the son was aged 15. Still under the impact of his recent orphan condition, the young Delfim kept the family business running for a while, only to become aware that his vocation and motivation lay elsewhere and thereby decided to pursue a lifelong engagement with study and intellectual quest. By that time he had converted from a non-religious upbringing to Protestantism, and became an active member of the cultural and sportive activities of the Portuguese YMCA.

By 1927, aged 20 (rather late according to average standards of 16/17) he completed high school and enrolled in the University of Porto Faculty of Arts graduating in History and Philosophy in 1931, being one of the last students of this famous school, closed by the authorities shortly after. He had Leonardo Coimbra and Teixeira Rego as his mentors during his student years and among his colleagues were Agostinho da Silva and Adolfo Casais Monteiro.

Immediately after graduation he initiated a career as high school teacher, first in Oporto, then in Lisbon, where he made his aggregation exam required to become a teacher in state run Portuguese high-schools. Having applied to a fellowship to study under the guidance of Martin Heidegger at Freiburg, he was awarded against his will a similar position in Vienna, Austria where he settled by October 1935 as a fellow of the Portuguese Higher Culture Institute, to study under Moritz Schlick, Karl Bühler and Othmar Spann, attending some of the famous Vienna Circle seminars, and writing his critical study on Logical Positivism entitled Positivism: a critical reappraisal (Situação Valorativa do Positivismo) which he presented as his two-years fellowship final report to the Portuguese funding entity. During the Winter Semester of 1936 he visited Berlin to meet Nicolai Hartmann and Eduard Spranger. Finally, he completed his critical survey of neopositivism by moving to the UK and studying with John Macmurray at the University College, London, and with Charlie Dunbar Broad and George Edward Moore at Trinity College, Cambridge, where the neopositivists had another stronghold (in 1939 the later was to be replaced by Ludwig Wittgenstein, a former loose associate of the Vienna Circle).

By mid-1937 he returned to Portugal for a short leave and was summoned to take the position of Portuguese Language Lecturer at the Luso-Brazilian Institute of the University of Berlin, a position he was actively seeking in order to become familiar with phenomenology. In the German capital he attended regularly the philosophical seminar of Nicolai Hartmann while getting also acquainted with some prominent Martin Heidegger's disciples like Ernesto Grassi. Delfim Santos was among the first to introduce Martin Heidegger to a Portuguese audience in his 1938 essay Heidegger and Hölderlin or the Essence of Poetry (Heidegger e Hölderlin ou a Essência da Poesia). Meanwhile, Delfim received his PhD in 1940 from Coimbra University presenting a thesis on Knowledge and Reality (Conhecimento e Realidade), and returned to Berlin where he was to remain until 1942, the year in which he permanently resettled in Portugal.

In 1947 he attained the position of Assistant Professor of Pedagogy at Lisbon University, submitting his essay on The Existential Foundations of Pedagogy (Fundamentação Existencial da Pedagogia), considered his most influential work among Portuguese and Brazilian educators and teachers, published in Portugal in 1946 and in Brazil in 1952. In 1950 he became the first Chair Professor of Pedagogy in Portugal. Among other subjects, he taught on History of Ancient Philosophy, History of Education, Ethics and School Administration. He also taught Psychology during several years in the Portuguese Military Academy.

Delfim attended numerous international Philosophy congresses and symposia, namely the 9th International Congress of Philosophy - Descartes Congress, Paris, France 1937, the 10th International Congress of Philosophy - Amsterdam. Holland 1948, the 1949 'First National Philosophy Congress' in Mendoza, Argentina, organized by the University of Cuyo, and the 1st International Philosophy Congress of Brazil, São Paulo, Brazil, 1954, organized by Miguel Reale. He also took part in some of the celebrated Eranos seminars in Switzerland. Under his guidance a Center for Pedagogic Studies was created in 1962 by the Calouste Gulbenkian Foundation, of which he became the Director until his early death, occurred in 1966, aged 58.

He was member of the Lisbon Academy of Sciences and exchanged personal correspondence with international scholars and writers such as Mircea Eliade, Constantin Noica, Hermann Hesse, Ernesto Grassi and Michael de Ferdinandy. One high school and several streets were named after him in the Portuguese districts of Lisbon, Evora, and Matosinhos (Oporto). In 1965 he was awarded a decoration by the Education Secretary of the city of São Paulo, Brazil.

== Works ==
Most of his writings were assembled in four volumes published by the Calouste Gulbenkian Foundation, ranging from philosophical and educational themes to cultural and issues of his time. His main books are:

- Positivism: a critical reappraisal (Situação Valorativa do Positivismo), 1938.
- On Philosophy (Da Filosofia), 1940.
- Knowledge and Reality (Conhecimento e Realidade), 1940.
- The Existential Foundations of Pedagogy (Fundamentação Existencial da Pedagogia), 1946.
- History of Philosophy in Portugal (O Pensamento Filosófico em Portugal), 1946.

Aware of the cinema educational and formative potential, he wrote a number of movie reviews, namely on The Prodigal Son (Luis Trenker, Germany 1934), The Third Man (Carol Reed, USA 1949) and Umberto D. (Vittorio de Sica, Italy 1952).

Some of his texts are available online:

- SANTOS, Delfim - Works in German, Spanish, French and English
- SANTOS, Delfim - On Ambiguity in Metaphysics, Mendoza: 1949
- SANTOS, Delfim - Pedagogy as Autonomous Science, Mendoza: 1949

== Main topics ==
Delfim's philosophical writings cover the study of modern and contemporary European thinkers, specially the contemporary German Phenomenologists, adopting the aporetic and anti-systematic approach to philosophical inquiry similar to onto-phenomenologist Nicolai Hartmann. Also from Hartmann's 'levels of reality' he adapted and further developed his own pluriversal or rather pluriregional views on 'reality', ascribing the scientific method of study exclusively to the material world and not to philosophical matters as the neopositivists propounded. He wrote comprehensively about the history of philosophical thinking in Portugal and Brazil, particularly on Silvestre Pinheiro Ferreira (1769–1846) arguably Brazil's first philosopher, and on Francisco Suárez (1548–1617), a Spanish scholar active at Coimbra University between 1597 and 1616.

In Education his work was highly influential to the renewal of Portuguese pedagogical ideas, aiming at an existential synthesis between Philosophy and Pedagogy. Delfim made extensive public proposals towards a complete reform of the Portuguese educational system from kindergarten to university, showing a strong concern for professional instruction and apprenticeship; he recommended characterology as an auxiliary to vocational guidance and published several essays on foreign pedagogues, namely on Johann Heinrich Pestalozzi and Maria Montessori, making also pioneering research on some of the most prominent Portuguese educationalists, notably Almeida Garrett (1799–1854) and Adolfo Coelho (1847–1919).

In the literary and aesthetic field he was one of the directors of the Journal A Águia and one of the ideologues of the Presença literary movement, (the so-called "Portuguese Second Modernism) which favored 'psychologism' by paying special attention to the protagonists' inner thoughts and conflicts of conscience, and articulated the Portuguese editions of German author Hermann Hesse, 1946 Literature Nobel laureate, whose work was deeply inspired by educational issues.

== Sources ==
- COELHO, Jacinto do Prado. 'Traços Biográficos de Delfim Santos', Março de 1968, intr. to Obras Completas, Vol I. Lisbon: Gulbenkian 1982, v-ix.
- RIBEIRO, Álvaro. Cartas Para Delfim Santos 1931 - 1956. Lisbon: Lusíada.
- SANTOS, Delfim. Curriculum Vitae, Lisbon: author, 1949.
- SANTOS, Delfim. Obras Completas, Lisbon: 3rd rev. ed. currently in print.

== Bibliography ==
- AAVV. Octogésimo Aniversário do Prof. Delfim Santos. Lisboa: Centro Cultural Delfim Santos 1990.
- BELO, José M. C. Para uma Teoria Política da Educação: Actualidade do Pensamento Filosófico, Pedagógico e Didáctico de Delfim Santos. Lisboa: Gulbenkian & FCT 1999.
- GANHO, Maria de Lourdes Sirgado. O Essencial sobre Delfim Santos. Lisboa: INCM.
- MARINHO, José. 'Delfim Santos e a Filosofia Situada' e 'A Ontofenomenologia em Delfim Santos', in Estudos sobre o Pensamento Português Contemporâneo. Lisboa 1981.
- MARQUES, Maria de Lurdes Santos Fonseca. O Pensamento Filosófico de Delfim Santos. Lisboa: INCM 2007.
- MIRANDA, Manuel Guedes da Silva. Delfim Santos: a Metafísica como Filosofia Fundamental. Lisboa: Gulbenkian 2003.
- MIRANDA, Rui Lopo. 'Delfim Pinto dos Santos', in António NÓVOA (dir.), Dicionário de Educadores Portugueses. Porto: Asa 2003, 1262–1265.
- PASZKIEWICZ, Cristiana Abranches de Soveral e. A Filosofia Pedagógica de Delfim Santos. Lisboa: INCM 2000.
- QUADROS, António. 'Delfim Santos – Introdução ao Pensamento Filosófico e Pedagógico', Leonardo 2, 1989.
- SOVERAL, Cristiana (ed.). Delfim Santos e a Escola do Porto. Lisboa: INCM 2009.
- TEIXEIRA, António Braz. O Essencial sobre a Filosofia Portuguesa (sécs. XIX e XX). Lisboa: INCM 2008.

== See also ==
- Antipositivism
- Neopositivism
- Vienna Circle
- Existentialism
- Phenomenology
- Existential phenomenology
- Ontology
- Nicolai Hartmann
- Pedagogy
- Philosophy of education
- Characterology
- Hermann Hesse
- Presença (Portuguese literary movement)
