= Branquinho da Fonseca =

Portuguese writer (1905–1974)

António José Branquinho da Fonseca (4 May 1905 – 7 May 1974) was a Portuguese writer. Some of his early works were published under the pseudonym António Madeira. He is best remembered as the first editor of Presença, "one of the most important, if not the most important, Portuguese literary reviews of the twentieth century", and for the novella The Baron.

== Biography ==
He was the son of the writer Tomás da Fonseca. He studied law at the University of Coimbra where he met José Régio and João Gaspar Simões. In 1923–1924 he co-founded the literary review Tríptico which lasted until 1925. In 1927 he and Gaspar Simões founded the literary review Presença and he served as its first editor. He left Presença in 1930 to edit the review journal Sinal (1930) with fellow Presença outcast Miguel Torga. Later he was a main contributor of Manifesto (1936–1938).

== Bibliography ==
Poetry

- Poemas (1926)
- Mar coalhado (1932; "Curdled Sea")

Plays

- Posição de Guerra (1928; "War Post")
- Teatro (1939)

Short stories and novellas

- Zonas (1931)
- Caminhos magnéticos (1938; "Magnetic Paths")
- O Barão (1942; "The Baron")
- Rio turvo (1945; "Turbid River")
- Mar Santo (1952; "Holy Sea")
- Bandeira preta (1956; "Black Banner")

Novels

- Porta de Minerva (1947; "Minerva's Gate")
