= Diogo de Macedo =

Portuguese painter, sculptor, and writer

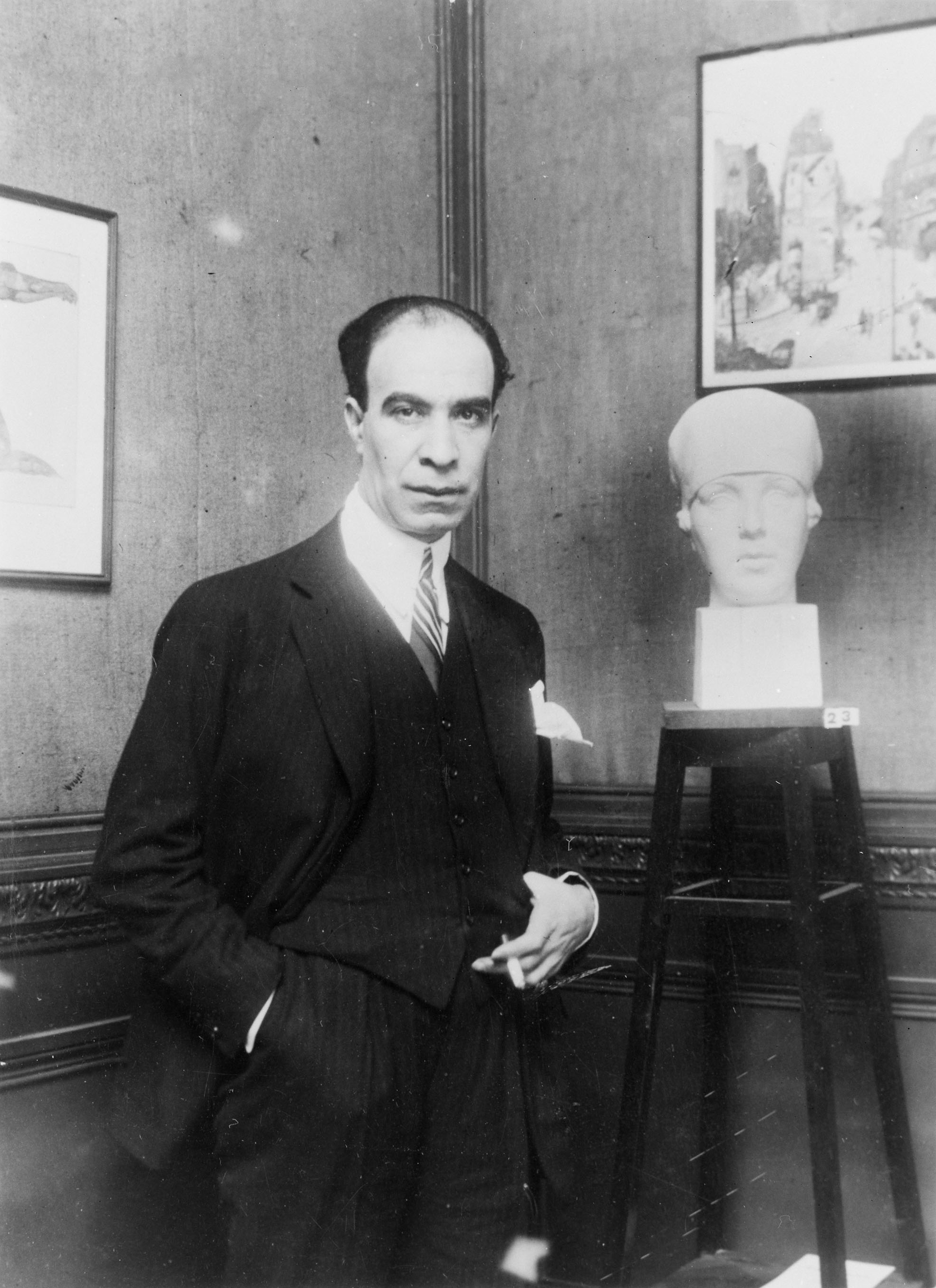
Diogo de Macedo, 1928

Diogo de Macedo (Vila Nova de Gaia, Portugal, 22 November 1889 – Lisbon, Portugal, 19 February 1959) was a Portuguese painter, sculptor, and writer.

== Biography ==
His first master was the "imaginary sculptor" Fernando Caldas, whose workshop was next to Diogo de Macedo's house and from whom he learned the rudiments of drawing and modeling. In 1902, he enrolled in the Academia Portuense de Belas Artes but failed for "inattention to study" and thus interrupted his studies. However, he continued to attend the Escola Industrial Infante D. Henrique and in 1906 he returned to the Academy in 1905, being a student of Teixeira Lopes. He finished the course in 1911 and that same year left for Paris at his family's expense. He attended the Academies of Montparnasse, namely the Académie de la Grande Chaumière, where he was influenced by Bourdelle's classes; and attended for a few months, the National School of Fine Arts.

Returns to Portugal in 1914; participates in several collective exhibitions, including the I Exhibition of Humorists and Modernists (Porto, 1915) and the Exhibition of Fantasists (Porto, 1916); exhibits individually (Porto and Lisbon). He marries in 1919 and the following year he settles again in France.

His work was mainly linked to the 1920s decade that he lived in Paris (1921–26), having exhibited at the Salon (1913, 1922, 1923). Diverse references converge in his work. "Romantic, obsessed by Rodin", interested in Bourdelle, he approached expressionism in many works (monument to Camões, 1911; bust of Camilo, 1913; etc.), in others he would be "a purely classical sculptor" (head of a woman, 1927; etc.) or perhaps even academic (Monument to Afonso de Albuquerque, 1930).

In his work one can highlight Torso de Mulher (or Baigneuse), 1923, where a "more essentially lyrical expressive taste" is present and which, according to José-Augusto França, is one of the best sculptural works of early Portuguese modernism.

He was the animator of reference exhibitions such as Cinco Independentes, (in which he participated, alongside Dórdio Gomes, Henrique Franco, Francisco Franco and Alfredo Miguéis as well as, by invitation, Eduardo Viana, Almada Negreiros, Mily Possoz), SNBA 1923, and the I Salão dos Independentes, SNBA, 1930.

== Sculpture ==
Sculpted, among others, the busts of:

- Antero de Quental (1929)
- Sara Afonso (1927)
- António Botto (1928)
- Mário Eloy (1932)
- some of the statues to the monumental fountain of Alameda (1940–1942)
- The Farewell (1920)
- Cabeça de rapaz (Head of a boy)
