= José Régio =

Portuguese writer and poet

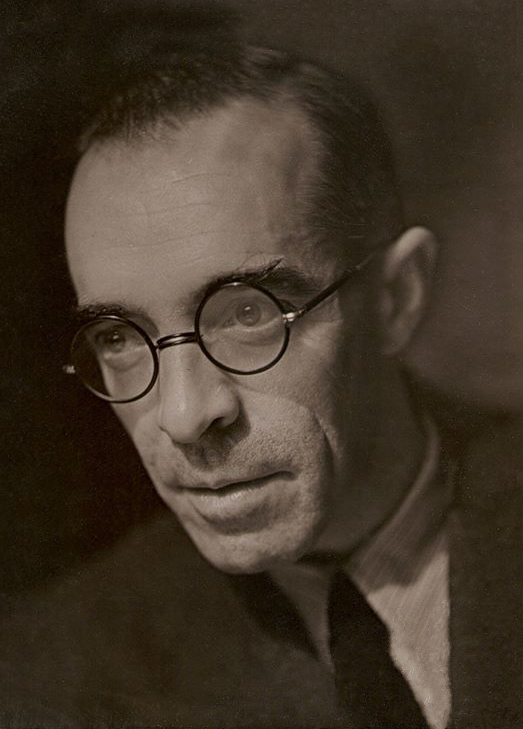
- Born: 17 September 1901; Vila do Conde, Kingdom of Portugal
- Died: 22 December 1969 (aged 68); Vila do Conde, Portugal
- Occupation: Writer
- Relatives: Júlio Maria dos Reis Pereira (brother)
- Writing career
- Literary movement: Modernism

José Maria dos Reis Pereira (17 September 1901 – 22 December 1969), better known by the pen name José Régio (Portuguese pronunciation: [ʒuˈzɛ ʁɛ.ʒju]), was a Portuguese writer who spent most of his life in Portalegre (1929 to 1962). He was the brother of Júlio Maria dos Reis Pereira, a painter and illustrator.

== Biography ==
In 1927 he founded the magazine Presença which would come to be a cornerstone of the Second Modernism movement in Portugal, of which he was the main spokesperson. Aside from this magazine he also made contributions to newspapers such as the Diário de Notícias and the Comércio do Porto.

He was defiant of the Estado Novo regime and was a member of the Movimento de Unidade Democrática (Movement of Democratic Unity), supporting Norton de Matos in his bid for the Portuguese presidency.

As a writer, José Régio was the author of novels, plays, poetry and essays. His works are strongly focused on the theme of conflict between Man and God and between Individual and Society; in a critical analysis of solitude and human relations. As an essayist, he dedicated himself to the study of Camões and Florbela Espanca.

== Published works ==
=== Poetry ===
- 1925 - Poemas de Deus e do Diabo.
- 1929 - Biografia.
- 1935 - As Encruzilhadas de Deus.
- 1945 - Fado (1941), Mas Deus é Grande.
- 1954 - A Chaga do Lado.
- 1961 - Filho do Homem.
- 1968 - Cântico Suspenso.
- 1970 - Música Ligeira.
- 1971 - Colheita da Tarde.

=== Fiction ===
- 1934 - Jogo da Cabra-Cega.
- 1941 - Davam Grandes Passeios aos Domingos.
- 1942 - O Príncipe com Orelhas de Burro.
- 1945 to 1966 - A Velha Casa.
- 1946 - Histórias de Mulheres, The Flame-Coloured Dress, UK, 1999 (+ Davam Grandes Passeios...) ISBN 1-85754-386-6
- 1962 - Há Mais Mundos.

=== Essays ===
- 1936 - Críticas e Criticados.
- 1938 - António Botto e o Amor.
- 1940 - Em Torno da Expressão Artística.
- 1952 - As Correntes e as Individualidades na Moderna Poesia Portuguesa.
- 1964 - Ensaios de Interpretação Crítica.
- 1967 - Três Ensaios sobre Arte.
- 1977 - Páginas de Doutrina e Crítica da Presença.

=== Plays ===
- 1936 - Sonho de uma Véspera de Exame.
- 1940 - Jacob e o Anjo.
- 1940 - Sou um Homem Moral.
- 1947 - Benilde ou a Virgem-Mãe.
- 1949 - El-Rei Sebastião.
- 1954 - A Salvação do Mundo.
- 1957 - Três Peças em Um Acto. (Três máscaras; O meu caso; Mário ou Eu Próprio - O Outro).
- 1967 - O Judeu Errante.
