= Afonso Dias =

Portuguese singer, musician, poet, and actor

- Born: Portugal
- Occupations: musician, singer, poet, actor

Afonso Dias is a Portuguese singer, musician, poet and actor. He was deputy of the Constitution Assembly of 1975/76 under the Popular Democratic Union (Portugal) (later, he was not involved in other political offices). In music, he was one of the founders of Grupo de Acção Cultural (GAC, the Cultural Group Action). He was involved in numerous presentation inside and outside Portugal, though he recorded different discs in the studio. Throughout his career, he took part in artistic shows with José Afonso, Sérgio Godinho, Francisco Fanhais, Manuel Freire, Pedro Barroso, Tino Flores, José Fanha and others, and he produced several solo studio albums. In theater, in the 1960s and the 1970s, he to part in theatrical plays with Costa Ferreira, Carmen Dolores and Rogério Paulo. He was the founder of Trupe Barlaventina - Jograis do Algarve in 1999, and performed numerous shows and made studio recordings. He worked as a director-actor and actor (and singer) from 2003 with the A Companhia de Teagro de Algarve (ACTA, Algarve Theatre Company). He was member of the Associação Música XXI (XXI Music Association), which had been recording several CD collections in Selecta.

== Discography ==
- O que vale a pena (1979)
  - Pela calada (1987)
  - Olhar de Pássaro (2000) (nominated for a José Afonso Award)
  - Na asa loira do Sol (2001)
  - Geometria do Sul (Southern Geometry), 2002
  - Abecedário a rimar (2003)
  - "13" (2010)
  - Fado Aleixo (2013)
  - O mar ao fundo (2014)

=== As soloist ===
  - Cantando espalharey I, II e III (2002, 3 CDs with multimedia)
  - Selected (Selecta) Collections:
    - Poetas da Lusofonia, (Lusophony Poets), 2006
    - Poesia de António Gedeão, (Poems by António Gedeão) 2006)
    - Poesia de Alberto Caeiro – O Guardador de rebanhos (Poems by Alberto Caeiro, Keeper of the Flocks), 2006
    - Poesia de Cabo Verde e Sete Poemas de Sebastião da Gama (Poetry of Cape Verde and Seven Poems by Sebastião da Gama), 2007
    - Poesia de Miguel Torga, Poems by Miguel Torga, 2007
    - Poesia de Natália Correia (Poems by Natália Correia), 2007
    - Fernando Pessoa e Ricardo Reis (Fernando Pessoa and Ricardo Reis)
    - Álvaro de Campos

=== WithTrupe Barlaventina ===
  - Lendas do País do Sul (Legens of the South of the Country), 1999
  - O perfume da palavra (Word Perfumes)

== Poetic works ==
  - Grande Angular (Great Angle), 2000
  - Toccata e Fuga (Toccata and Fugue), 2003
