= Adamastor =

Mythological character created by the Portuguese poet Luís de Camões

- Os Lusíadas character
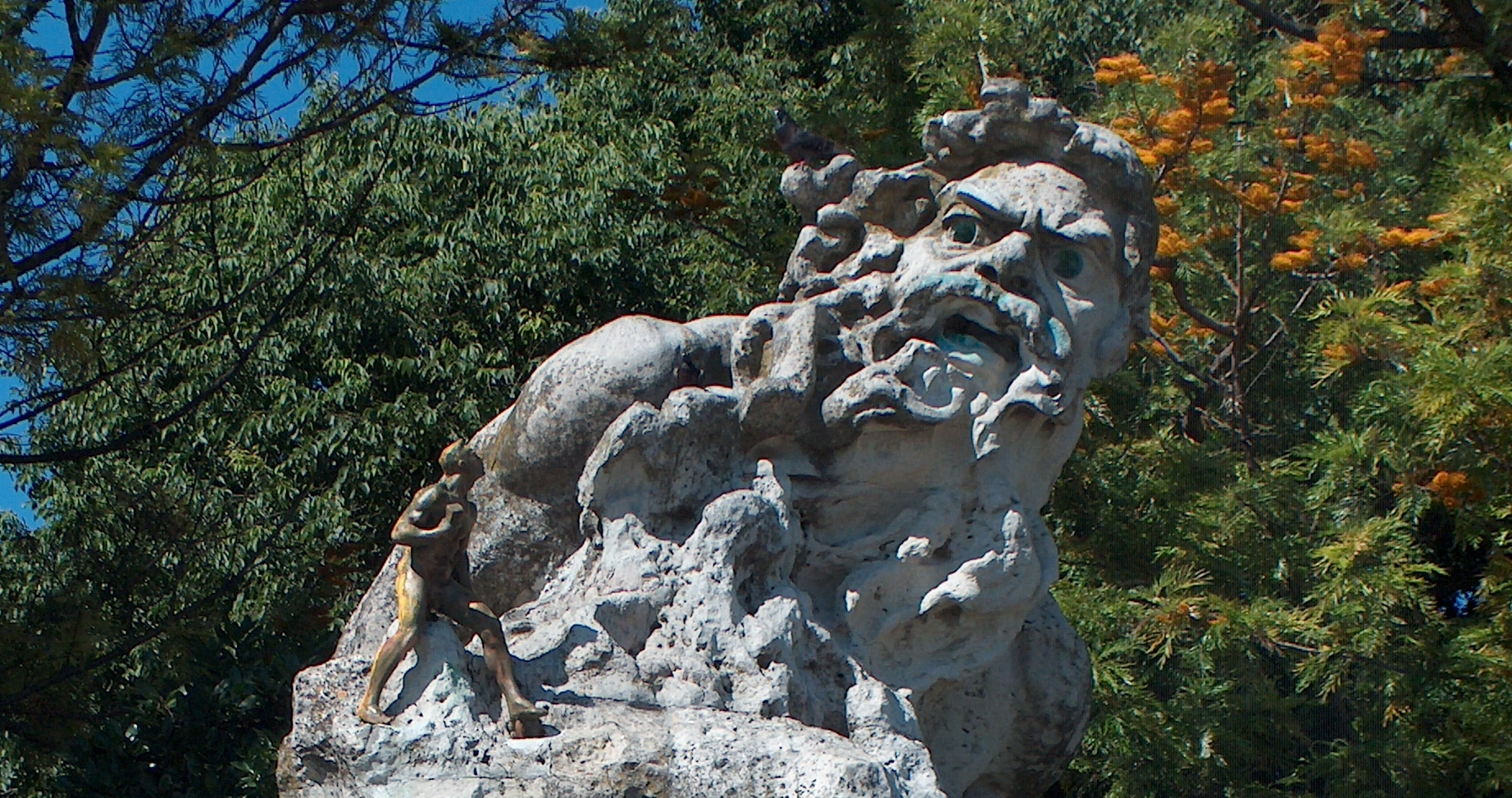
- Statue of Adamastor by Júlio Vaz Júnior, unveiled in 1927 at the Santa Catarina viewpoint, Lisbon, Portugal
- Created by: Luís de Camões

In-universe information
- Description: Greek-type mythological character
- Mentioned in: "Death with Interruptions" by José Saramago; The Year Of the Death of Ricardo Reis by José Saramago; Balthasar and Blimunda by José Saramago; The First Life of Adamastor by André Brink; L'Africaine (1865 opera); Essai sur la poésie épique by Voltaire; Les Misérables by Victor Hugo; The Phantom of the Opera by Gaston Leroux, Poésies et Lettres, by Comte de Lautréamont, Mensagem, by Fernando Pessoa

Adamastor is a mythological character created by the Portuguese poet Luís de Camões in his epic poem Os Lusíadas (first printed in 1572), as a personification of the Cape of Good Hope, symbolizing the dangers of the sea and the formidable forces of nature challenged and ultimately overcome by the Portuguese during the Age of Discovery. Adamastor manifests itself out of a storm.

== Background ==
Camões gave his creation a backstory as one of the Giants of Greek mythology, banished to the Cape of Good Hope by sea goddess Doris for falling in love with her daughter Tethis, now appearing out of a storm cloud and threatening to ruin anyone hardy enough to attempt passing the Cape and penetrate the Indian Ocean, which was Adamastor's domain. Adamastor became the spirit of the Cape of Good Hope, a hideous phantom of unearthly pallor:

Even as I spoke, an immense shape
Materialised in the night air,
Grotesque and enormous stature
With heavy jowls, and an unkempt beard
Scowling from shrunken, hollow eyes
Its complexion earthy and pale,
Its hair grizzled and matted with clay,
Its mouth coal black, teeth yellow with decay.

— Camões, The Lusiads Book V

Vasco da Gama, ahead of the Portuguese expedition, confronts the creature by asking "Who are you?", prompting Adamastor to tell his story.

I am that vast, secret promontory
you Portuguese call the Cape of Storms
which neither Ptolemy, Pompey or Strabo,
Pliny, nor any authors knew of.
Here Africa ends. Here its coast
Concludes in this, my vast inviolate
Plateau, extending southwards towards the Pole
And, by your daring, struck to my very soul.

— Camões, The Lusiads Book V

Deeply moved, the giant eventually vanishes, dispersing the clouds and calming the sea, leaving the path towards India open.

Adamastor represented the dangers Portuguese sailors faced when trying to round the Cape of Storms – Cabo das Tormentas – henceforth called the Cape of Good Hope.

== Legacy ==
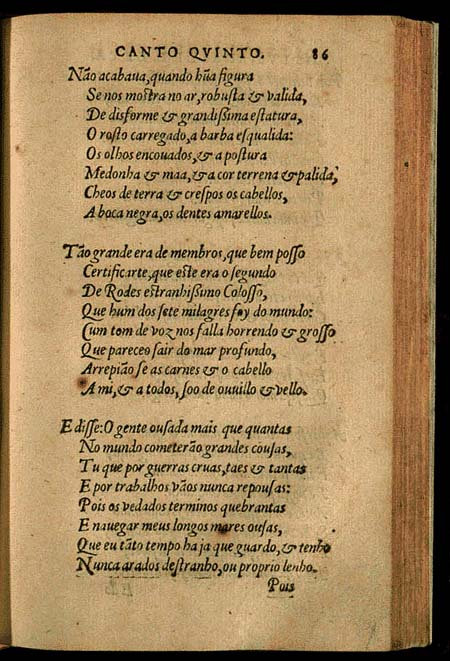
The corresponding verses in the 1572 edition.

A popular gathering place in Lisbon is known by the name 'Adamastor' because of the large stone statue of the mythical figure which presides over the space, which is officially called the Miradouro de Santa Catarina. The location offers visitors some of the most scenic views of the Tagus river, the 25 de Abril Bridge and the Cristo-Rei monument.

The Portuguese poet Fernando Pessoa included in his 1934 book Mensagem a number of verses dedicated to Adamastor, entitled O Mostrengo ("The Hideous Monster")

Adamastor, both the mythological character and the sculpture, are mentioned several times in Nobel Prize winner José Saramago's novels, such as in The Year of the Death of Ricardo Reis, and also in his historical novel Memorial do Convento (English language version: Baltasar and Blimunda).

Adamastor has figured in much poetry of the Cape. In The First Life of Adamastor, a novella by André Brink, the writer refashioned the Adamastor story from a 20th-century perspective.

Adamastor is also mentioned in the opera L'Africaine (1865) about Vasco da Gama by the composer Giacomo Meyerbeer. The slave Nelusko sings a song about Adamastor while he deliberately steers the ship into a storm and it sinks.

It is mentioned by Voltaire in his Essai sur la poésie épique. It also appears in the works of Victor Hugo: Les Misérables (III, Marius, chap III) and in a poem dedicated to Lamartine (Les Feuilles d'automne, chap IX). Alexandre Dumas, père refers the giant six times: Le Comte de Monte Cristo (chap. XXXI), Vingt ans après (chap. LXXVII), Georges (chap. I), Bontekoe, Les drames de la mer, (chap. I), Causeries (chap. IX) and Mes Mémoires (chap. CCXVIII). Gaston Leroux also mentions it in The Phantom of the Opera (chap. VII). Herman Melville mentions Adamastor in his Billy Budd in Chapter VIII as "Camoen's Spirit of the Cape".

Adamastor is also the name of a sauropod dinosaur, Angolatitan adamastor, found in Angola, named by the paleontologist Octávio Mateus.

== Etymology ==
The name Adamastor is an adaptation for the Portuguese language from the Greek word for "Untamed" or "Untameable" (Adamastos) (which the Portuguese did tame).
