= Lüdke =

Lüdke is a surname. Notable people with the surname include:

- Bruno Lüdke (1908–1944), alleged prolific German serial killer
- Erich Lüdke (1882–1946), German General of the Infantry
- Martin Lüdke (born 1943), German journalist and literary critic
- Tamara Lüdke (born 1991), German politician

== See also ==
- Luke (name)
