= Mar Português =

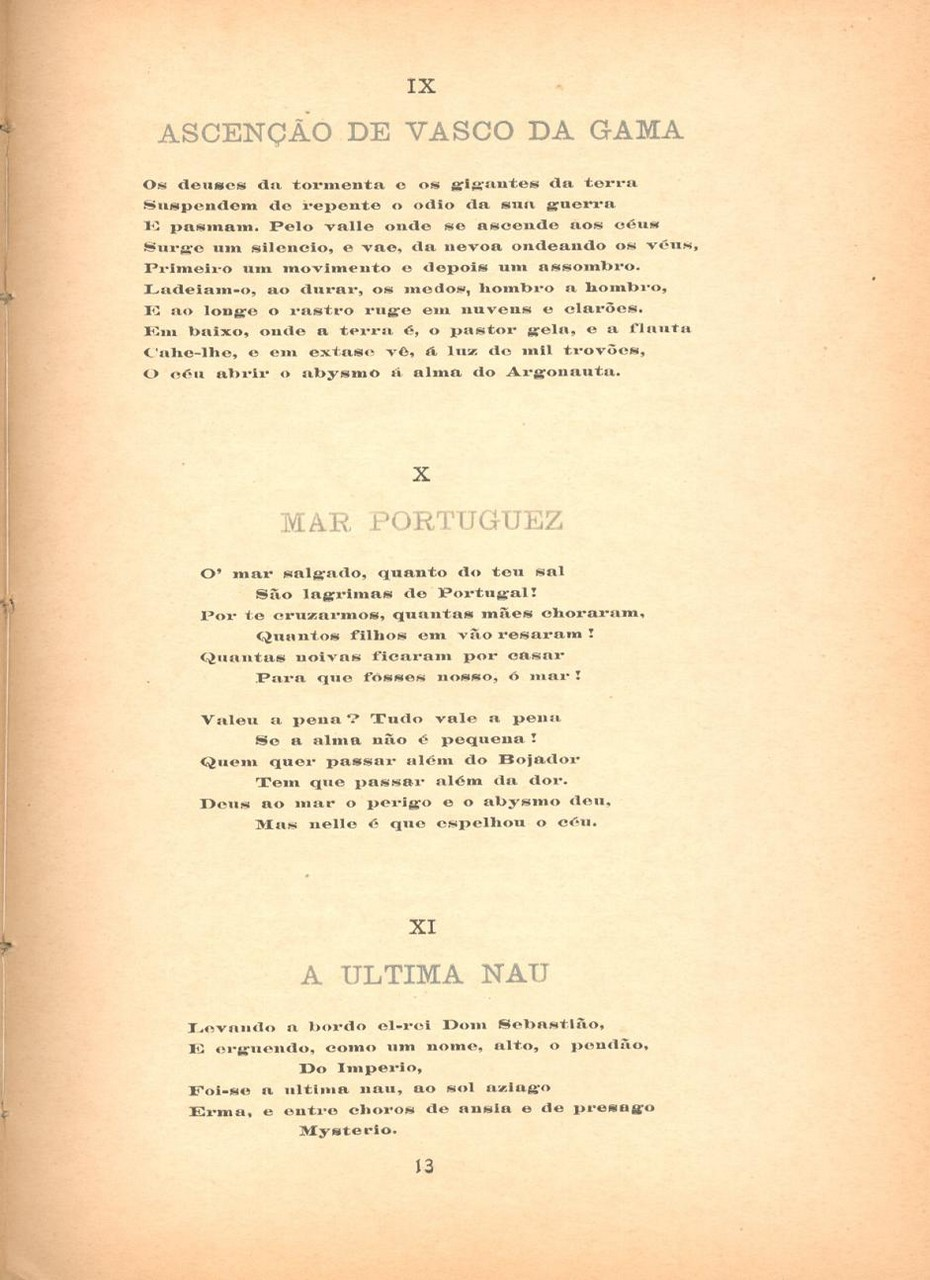
Original Mar Portuguez publication (Contemporânea magazine, 1922)

Mar Português (also written as Mar Portuguez) is one of the most well-known poems of the Portuguese poet Fernando Pessoa.

Originally published in the Contemporânea magazine in 1922 and later integrated to the book Mensagem (1934), Mar Português is of a notably nationalistic tone, along the rest of Mensagem. The poetry collection is divided between three themes — Brasão, Mar Português and O Encoberto — and concerns itself to the Portuguese explorations of the Age of Discovery by the characters of Vasco da Gama, Ferdinand Magellan and Prince Henry the Navigator.

== Analysis ==
The poem is composed by two stanzas of six verses each. The verses are composed in an alternating fashion of ten and eight syllables.

Ó mar salgado, quanto do teu sal
São lágrimas de Portugal!
Por te cruzarmos, quantas mães choraram,
Quantos filhos em vão rezaram!
Quantas noivas ficaram por casar
Para que fosses nosso, ó mar!

Valeu a pena? Tudo vale a pena
Se a alma não é pequena.
Quem quer passar além do Bojador
Tem que passar além da dor.
Deus ao mar o perigo e o abismo deu,
Mas nele é que espelhou o céu.

Mar Português was also analyzed from a contemporary perspective relating the poem to the Syrian civil war refugees.
