= The Book of Disquiet =

Book by Fernando Pessoa, published in 1982

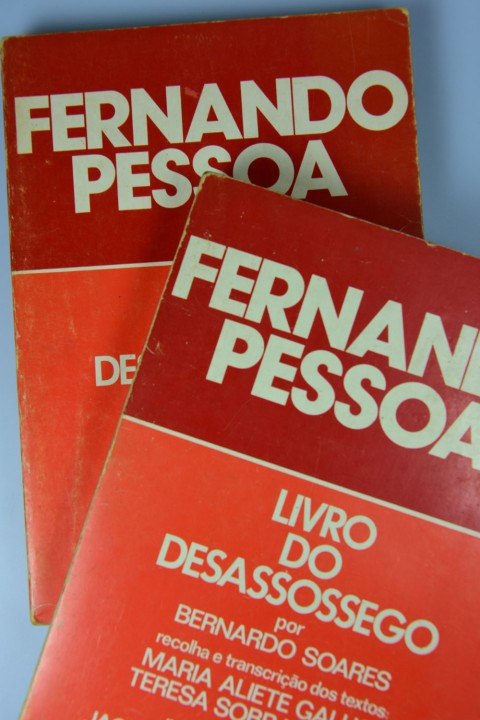
- First edition
- Author: Fernando Pessoa
- Original title: Livro do Desassossego
- Language: Portuguese
- Publication date: 1982
- Publication place: Portugal

The Book of Disquiet (Portuguese: Livro do Desassossego: Composto por Bernardo Soares, ajudante de guarda-livros na cidade de Lisboa) is a work by the Portuguese author Fernando Pessoa (1888–1935). Published posthumously, The Book of Disquiet is a fragmentary lifetime project, left unedited by the author, who introduced it as a "factless autobiography". The publication was credited to Bernardo Soares, one of the author's alternate writing names, which he called a semi-heteronym, and had a preface attributed to Fernando Pessoa, another alternate writing name or orthonym.

== Editions ==
In Lisbon there are a few restaurants or eating houses located above decent-looking taverns, places with the heavy, domestic look of restaurants in towns far from any rail line. These second-story eateries, usually empty except on Sundays, frequently contain curious types whose faces are not interesting but who constitute a series of digressions from life.

— Fernando Pessoa, from The Book of Disquiet, trans. Alfred MacAdam.

Much studied by "Pessoan" critics, who have different interpretations regarding the book's proper organization, The Book of Disquiet was first published in Portuguese in 1982, 47 years after Pessoa's death (the author died at age 47 in 1935). The book has seen publication in Spanish (1984), German (1985), Italian (1986), French (1988), English (1991), and Dutch (1990 (selection), and 1998 (full)). The Book in 1991 had four English editions by different translators: Richard Zenith (editor and translator), Iain Watson, Alfred MacAdam, and Margaret Jull Costa. The Book is a bestseller, especially in Spanish, Italian, and German (from different translators and publishers).

The book appeared on the Norwegian Book Club's list of the all-time 100 best works of literature, based on the responses of 100 authors from 54 countries.

== Interpretations ==
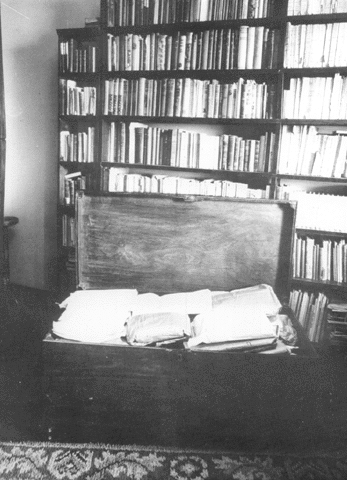
Pessoa's legacy: the chest, with more than 25,000 pages, and part of his personal library

Teresa Sobral Cunha, who edited the first version with Jacinto do Prado Coelho and Maria Aliete Galhoz in 1982, considers there to be two authors of The Book of Disquiet: Vicente Guedes in the first phase (in the 1910s and 1920s), and the aforementioned Bernardo Soares (late 1920s and 1930s).

However, António Quadros considers the first phase of the book to belong to Pessoa himself. The second phase, more personal and diary-like, is the one credited to Bernardo Soares.

Richard Zenith, editor of a new Portuguese edition in 1998, took the option of presenting a single volume, as in his English translation of 1991. In his introduction, he writes that "if Bernardo Soares does not measure up to the full Pessoa, neither are his diary writings the sum total of Disquietude, to which he was after all a johnny-come-lately. The Book of Disquietude was various books (yet ultimately one book), with various authors (yet ultimately one author), and even the word disquietude changes meaning as time passes."

George Steiner on The Book Of Disquiet:

"The fragmentary, the incomplete is of the essence of Pessoa's spirit. The very kaleidoscope of voices within him, the breadth of his culture, the catholicity of his ironic sympathies – wonderfully echoed in Saramago's great novel about Ricardo Reis – inhibited the monumentalities, the self-satisfaction of completion. Hence the vast torso of Pessoa's Faust on which he laboured much of his life. Hence the fragmentary condition of The Book of Disquiet, which contains material that predates 1913 and which Pessoa left open-ended at his death. As Adorno famously said, the finished work is, in our times and climate of anguish, a lie.

"It was to Bernardo Soares that Pessoa ascribed his Book of Disquiet, first made available in English in a briefer version by Richard Zenith in 1991. The translation is at once penetrating and delicately observant of Pessoa's astute melancholy. What is this Livro do Desassossego? Neither 'commonplace book', nor 'sketchbook', nor 'florilegium' will do. Imagine a fusion of Coleridge's notebooks and marginalia, of Valéry's philosophic diary and of Robert Musil's voluminous journal. Yet even such a hybrid does not correspond to the singularity of Pessoa's chronicle. Nor do we know what parts thereof, if any, he ever intended for publication in some revised format."

== Translations into English ==
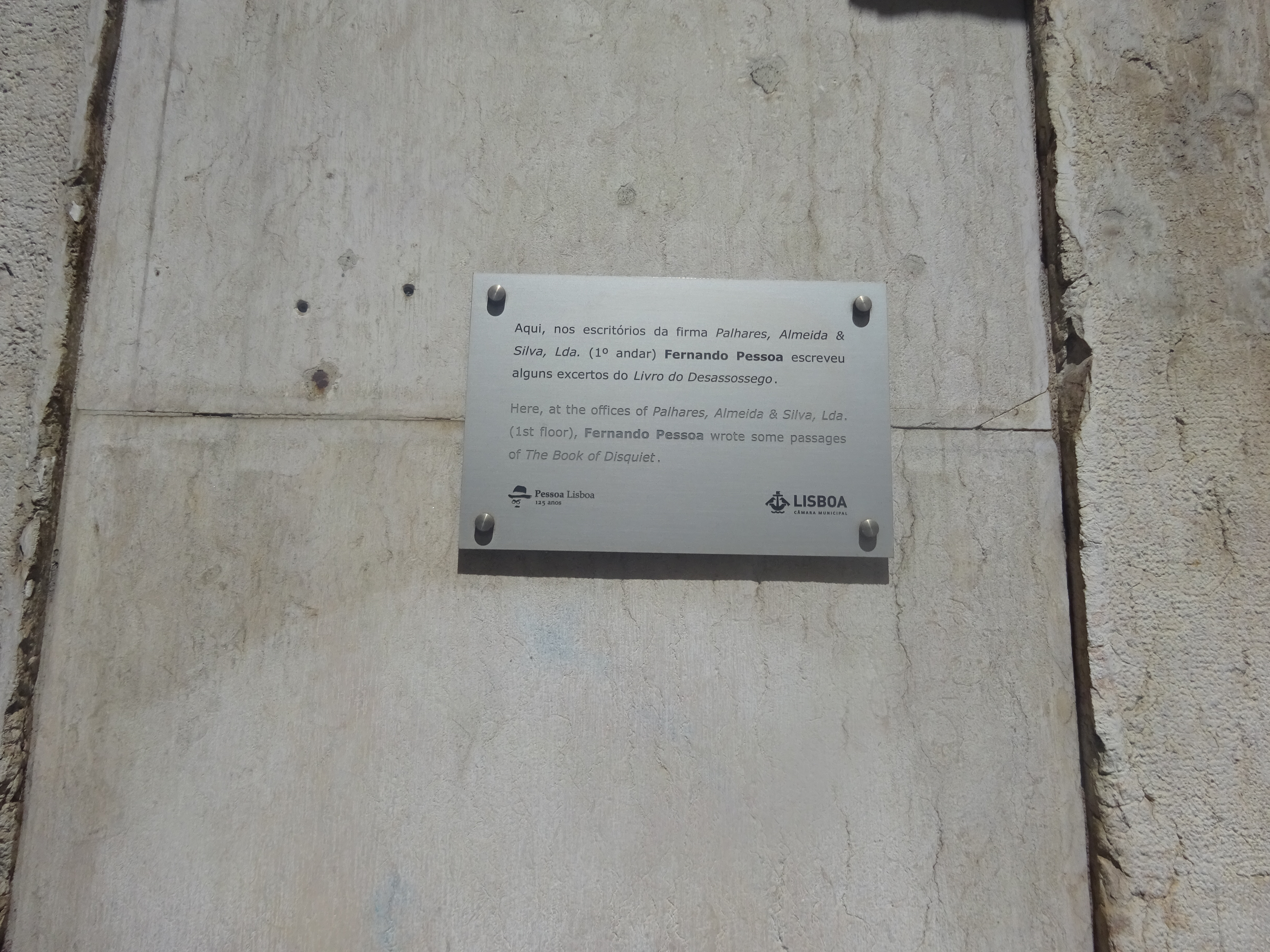
Plaque in Lisbon marking a building where part of The Book of Disquiet was written

- The Book of Disquietude, tr. Richard Zenith (Manchester: Carcanet Press, 1991, 323 p., ISBN 0-14-118304-7). Based on the 1982 Edições Ática edition, edited by Jacinto do Prado Coelho.
- The Book of Disquiet, tr. Margaret Jull Costa (London, New York: Serpent's Tail, 1991, 262 p., ISBN 1-85242-204-1). Based on the 1986 Feltrinelli edition, edited by Maria José de Lancastre.
- The Book of Disquiet, tr. Richard Zenith (London: Allen Lane, 2001, 508 p., ISBN 978-0713995275). Based on the 1998 Assírio & Alvim edition, edited by Richard Zenith.
- The Book of Disquiet: The Complete Edition, tr. Margaret Jull Costa (New York: New Directions, 2017, 488 p., ISBN 978-0811226936). Based on the 2013 Tinta-da-china edition, edited by Jerónimo Pizarro.
- The Book of Disquiet, tr. Alfred Mac Adam (New York: Pantheon Books, 1991, 276 p., ISBN 0-679-40234-9).
- The Book of Disquiet: A Selection, tr. Iain Watson (London: Quartet Books, 1991, 195 p., ISBN 0-7043-0153-9).

The two most widely read editions differ substantially in editorial approach. Richard Zenith's 2001 Allen Lane edition presents a curated selection of fragments arranged for literary coherence and is the version most commonly cited in essays and philosophical discussions. The New Directions Complete Edition translated by Margaret Jull Costa (2017) includes all known fragments without editorial selection, prioritising completeness and scholarly fidelity over narrative shape; it is considered the standard scholarly edition.

== See also ==
- Saudade
