= Saudosismo =

Portuguese aesthetic and philosophical movement

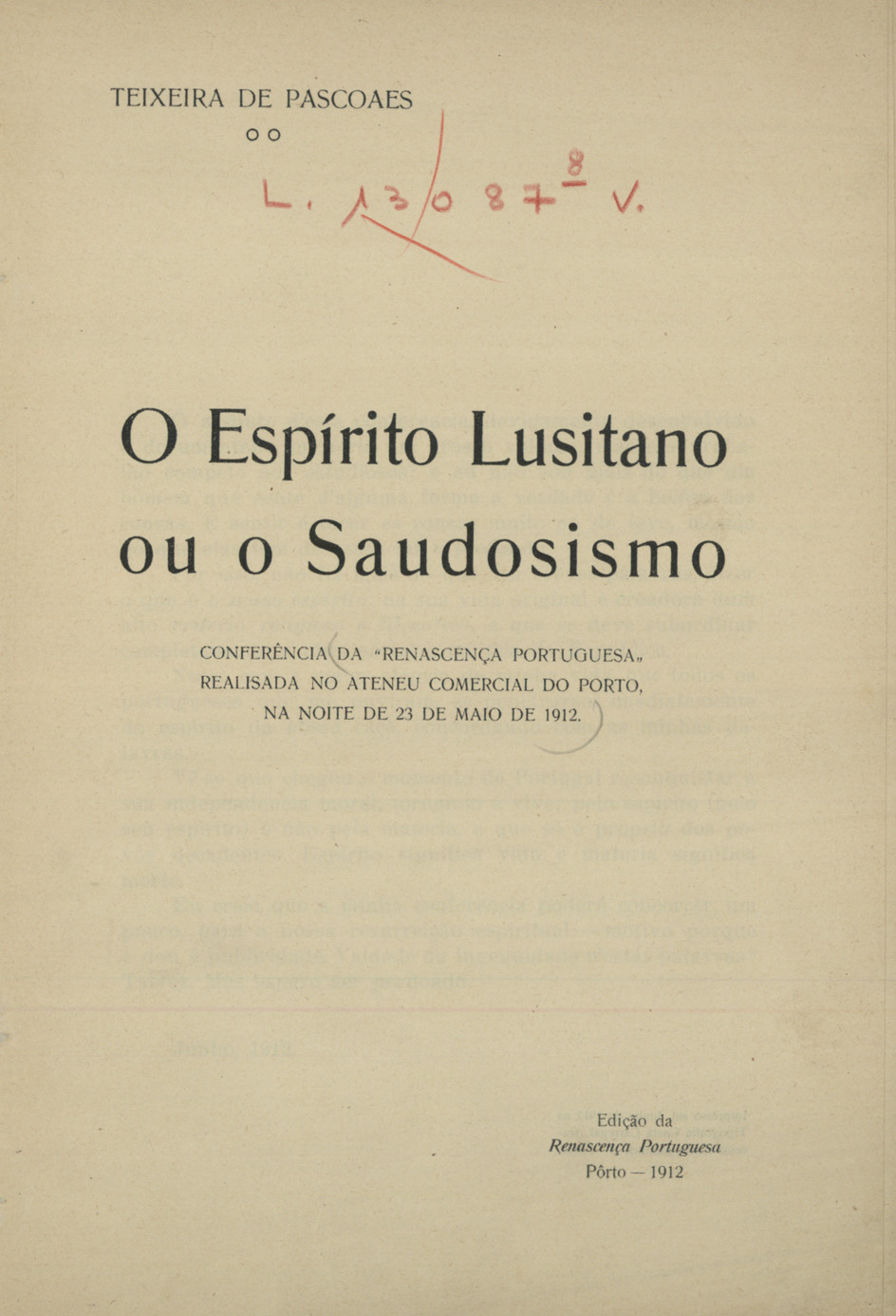
Frontispiece of the 1912 book O Espírito Lusitano ou o Saudosismo, a manifesto of the saudosista movement

Saudosismo (which can be translated as nostalgism) was an aesthetic and philosophical movement of a nationalist character that developed in early 20th-century Portugal, shaping Portuguese literature, art, religiosity, and national identity.

Led by the neo-romantic poet Teixeira de Pascoaes, it reunited intellectuals such as António Sérgio, António Carneiro, and Jaime Cortesão around the task of 'regenerating Portugal' through cultural renewal. The movement, which started in Porto around 1912, was based with a concept of the 'Portuguese soul' that valued saudade as its quintessential manifestation. Pascoaes and other writers attempted to portray this movement as a theory of humankind, where a mystic nationalism would advance the "Lusitanian Race".

Emerging amid political crisis, with the launch of the First Portuguese Republic in 1910, and perceived cultural decadence, the saudosistas sought to reinterpret Portugal, its destiny, and its place in Western civilization, within a traditionalist perspective, drawing on symbols like sebastianism and from elements of Camonian poetics.

The dominant strand of the movement, centered on the journals Seara Nova (pt) and A Águia, advocated a moderate approach, focused on education and social reform. But a dissenting group, led by António Sardinha and opting for political action, soon broke away to align with Lusitanian Integralism. The movement's rejection of industrial society and its inclination towards Christian spirituality distinguished it from Portuguese modernism, then represented by the journal Orpheu (pt).

Saudosismo's influence extended beyond Portugal, reaching both Brazil and Galicia. It found resonance among intellectuals around the Galician journal A Nosa Terra (gl).

== See also ==
- Saudade
- Fernando Pessoa
