= 35 Sonnets =

Poetry collection by Fernando Pessoa

- Cover page
- Author: Fernando Pessoa
- Language: English
- Genre: Poetry
- Published: 1918 (Monteiro & Co.)
- Publication place: Portugal
- Media type: Print (chapbook)
- Pages: 20 pp
- OCLC: 18125186
- Text: 35 Sonnets at Wikisource

35 Sonnets is a collection of sonnets by Fernando Pessoa published by the author in 1918.

== Publication ==
35 Sonnets is one of two books self-published by Pessoa in 1918 under the publisher name Monteiro & Co, the other book published in 1918 was Antinous, A Poem. 35 Sonnets was printed by Lamas, Motta & C.a, 100, Rua da Alegria, Lisbon, and Antinous by Sociedade Typographica Editora. 35 Poems has a height of 20 centimetres (7.9 in). The author sent copies to several British literary journals. There is no colophon supplying the actual date of printing of each book, but given the different printers employed, it may be assumed that some time elapsed between them.

== Reception ==
35 Sonnets received fairly positive reviews from various British journals. A Glasgow Herald review was positive, but noted that the sonnets bore a "crabbedness of speech," likely due to an "imitation of a Shakespearean trick." However, a reviewer from the Times Literary Supplement said of 35 Sonnets that the author's "command of English is less remarkable than his knowledge of Elizabethan English."

== Sources ==
- Zenith, Richard (2006). A Little Larger Than the Entire Universe: Selected Poems. Penguin. p. 436. ISBN 9780143039556.
- The English Poetry of Pessoa
