= The Disquiet of Senhor Pessoa =

2024 comic book by Nicolas Barral

The Disquiet of Senhor Pessoa (L'intranquille monsieur Pessoa)
- Date: 20 September 2024
- Page count: 136 pages
- Publisher: Dargaud

Creative team
- Writer: Nicolas Barral
- Artist: Nicolas Barral

Original publication
- Language: French
- ISBN: 9782205206142

The Disquiet of Senhor Pessoa (French: L'intranquille monsieur Pessoa) is a comic book by the French writer and illustrator Nicolas Barral, published by Dargaud in 2024.

== Plot ==
Set in Lisbon in November 1935, the book is about the last days in the life of the Portuguese writer Fernando Pessoa, told from the perspective of a young journalist tasked with writing his obituary in advance.

== Publication ==
Dargaud published the album in French on 20 September 2024. Europe Comics published an English-language version which only is available digitally.

== Reception ==
Benjamin Roure of BoDoï wrote that The Disquiet of Senhor Pessoa is not a regular biography but something more poetic, and fully enjoyable also for people unfamiliar with Pessoa's works. He wrote that the book evokes a sense of nostalgia for a Lisbon of the past and portrays its subject's creativity in a touching way.
