= Ricardo Reis (heteronym) =

Heteronym by poet Fernando Pessoa

- Born: 19 September 1887 Porto, Portugal
- Died: Brazil
- Occupation: Doctor; poet
- Language: Portuguese, English

Ricardo Reis (European Portuguese: [ʁiˈkaɾðu ˈʁɐjʃ]) is a heteronym of the Portuguese poet Fernando Pessoa. In his fictional biography, Reis was born in Porto in 1887, one year older than Fernando Pessoa, who describes him as very little shorter and stronger, but slim and a vague matte brown. Reis was educated at a Jesuit boarding school becoming a Latinist by education and a semi-Hellenist by his own, thus writing better than Pessoa, but with a purism that his author considered exaggerated. He was a doctor and Neoclassical poet who wrote neopagan, epicurist and stoicist odes. Politically a monarchist, he went into exile to Brazil after the defeat of a monarchical rebellion in Porto against the Portuguese Republic in 1919.

== Critical overview ==
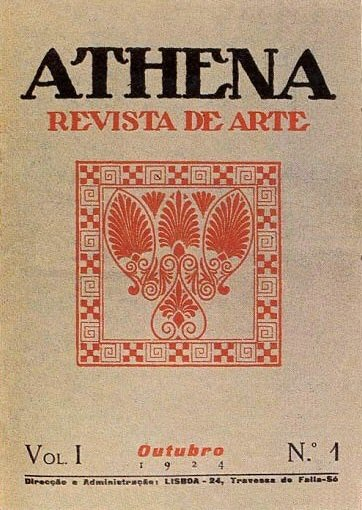
Athena: Revista de Arta (1924–1925) Issue Nr. 1.

Reis Odes were first published in 1924 in the Athena: Revista de Arte, founded by Fernando Pessoa and Ruy Vaz. Further eight odes were later published between 1927 and 1930 in the literary journal Presença. The remaining poems and prose were published posthumously. In a letter to William Bentley, director of the journal Portugal, on October 31, 1924, to announce his journal Athena, Pessoa wrote that "a knowledge of the language would be indispensable, for instance, to appraise the 'Odes' of Ricardo Reis, whose Portuguese would draw upon him the blessing of António Vieira, as his style and diction are that of Horace (he has been called, admirably I believe, 'a Greek Horace who writes in Portuguese')". Since Pessoa didn't determine the death of Reis, one can assume that he survived his author who died on November 30, 1935. In the novel The Year of the Death of Ricardo Reis (1984), the Portuguese writer José Saramago rebuilds, in his own personal outlook, the literary world of this heteronym after 1935, creating a dialog between Ricardo Reis and the ghost of his author.

"How I write on behalf of these three [ heteronyms ].... Caeiro out of pure and unexpected inspiration, without knowing or even calculating that he was going to write. Ricardo Reis, after an abstract deliberation, which suddenly materialized into an ode."

— Fernando Pessoa, "Letter to Adolfo Casais Monteiro", January 13, 1935.

== Books ==
- Zenith, Richard. Pessoa: A Biography. New York: Liveright Publishing Corporation, 2021, ISBN 9781324090779. Also published as Pessoa: An Experimental Life. London: Allen Lane, 2021.
- Sadlier, Darlene J. An Introduction to Fernando Pessoa, Literary Modernist. Gainesville, FL: University Press of Florida, 1998.
- Lancastre, Maria José de and Antonio Tabucchi. Fernando Pessoa: Photographic Documentation and Caption.Paris : Hazan, 1997.
- Kotowicz, Zbigniew. Fernando Pessoa: Voices of a Nomadic Soul. London: Menard, 1996.
- Lisboa, Eugénio and L. C. Taylor. A Centenary Pessoa. Manchester, England: Carcanet, 1995.
- Green, J. C. R. Fernando Pessoa: The Genesis of the Heteronyms. Isle of Skye: Aquila, 1982.
- Monteiro, George. The Man Who Never Was: Essays on Fernando Pessoa. Providence, RI: Gávea-Brown, 1982.
