= Alberto Caeiro =

Heteronym of poet Fernando Pessoa

- Born: Alberto José Caeiro; 16 April 1889; Lisbon, Portugal
- Died: 1915 (aged 25–26); Lisbon, Portugal

Alberto José Caeiro (European Portuguese pronunciation: [alˈβɛɾtu ʒuˈsɛ kɐˈɐjɾu]) is a heteronym of the Portuguese poet Fernando Pessoa, first used in 1914 and introduced in print in 1925. In his fictional biography, Caeiro was born in Lisbon on 16 April 1889, lived most of his life in a village in Ribatejo and died in 1915. He was the leader and teacher of a group of neopagan poets and intellectuals that included Pessoa's other heteronyms António Mora, Ricardo Reis and Álvaro de Campos.

Caeiro was the first of Pessoa's major heteronyms. The first and most famous work Pessoa composed under this name was The Keeper of Sheep, a series of 49 poems he began in 1914 and continued to edit until his death in 1935. The rest of Caeiro's poems are grouped under the headings The Shepherd in Love and Uncollected Poems. Like Pessoa's works in general, the Caeiro poems began to receive high critical acclaim decades after the writer's death. The first collection of them was published in Portugal in 1946.

== Development ==
Fernando Pessoa (1888–1935) was a Portuguese poet who posthumously became highly regarded in European literature. Alberto Caeiro was the first of his major heteronyms, a term he used for what was a mixture of pen names, author personas and fictional characters. According to a letter Pessoa wrote to the literary critic Adolfo Casais Monteiro, he created Caeiro on 8 March 1914, when he wrote a first series of poems for what would become The Keeper of Sheep.

Front cover of Athena issue 4

The first time any material was published under Caeiro's name was in January 1925, when 23 poems from The Keeper of Sheep appeared in issue 4 of Athena: Revista de Arte, a literary journal edited by Pessoa together with Ruy Vaz. Some of the Uncollected Poems were published in Athena no. 5. Further material appeared in Presença in 1931. Pessoa continued to revise the poems throughout his life and some of them exist in many variants.

Eduardo Lourenço stressed the influence from Walt Whitman, notably in the 1977 essay, "Walt Whitman e Pessoa" (lit. 'Walt Whitman and Pessoa'"). According to Lourenço, the heteronyms Caeiro and Álvaro de Campos emerged through an "explosion of Pessoa's universe when confronted with Whitman's universe". Lourenço distinguished Campos, where the influence from Whitman is more direct, from Caeiro, where it is suppressed. In a text uncovered after Lourenço wrote his essay, Pessoa commented, under his English-language heteronym Thomas Crosse, on perceived similarities between Caeiro and Whitman, arguing that Caeiro was a superior poet and there was no influence from Whitman. Based partially on Pessoa's assertive denial, the scholar Richard Zenith argues that the influence from Whitman was considerable.

== Life and views ==
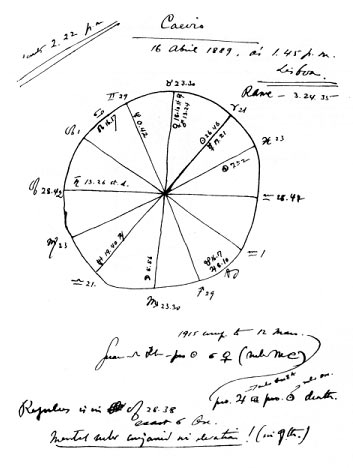
Horoscope for Caeiro's time and place of birth, created by Pessoa

In the fictional biography Pessoa created for Caeiro, the poet was born in Lisbon, Portugal, on 16 April 1889. In one annotation, his year of birth is instead given as 1887 and he is said to have two suppressed middle names. He lived his first two years in Lisbon, but lived most of his life in a village in the Ribatejo Province, where he wrote the majority of his poems. After staying a few months in Lisbon in 1915, Caeiro died from tuberculosis.

In his poems, Caeiro boasts about being ignorant about literature and having little education. He describes his early poems collected in The Keeper of Sheep as a child's work. He developed his own poetics based on free verse and a worldview that premiered the immediate experience and rejected attempts to find an underlying truth or meaning in things.

Caeiro was a major character in Pessoa's fictional universe, something Pessoa referred to as "interluding fictions" (ficções do interlúdio). He functioned as someone who Pessoa's other heteronyms looked up to, and even under his real name, Pessoa described Caeiro as his master. Caeiro was the central figure of the Programa geral do Neo-Paganismo Português (lit. 'General Programme of Portuguese Neo-Paganism'), through which Pessoa's heteronyms sought to explore neopaganism with Caeiro as their starting point. Under the heteronym of António Mora, Pessoa wrote about Caeiro and paganism:

In order for paganism to be reborn, a pagan needed to appear, a man with a pagan mind, who could spontaneously reveal that pagan sensibility for others to adapt and give intellectual form to. We needed to find the insubstantial substance, of paganism, so that others might feel and understand it, and give it its due attributes.

If Destiny wanted that to be so, then it would be. And Destiny did.

Alberto Caeiro appeared.

== Works ==
Pessoa wrote 104 poems under the Caeiro heteronym.

The Keeper of Sheep (Portuguese: O Guardador de Rebanhos) is a collection of 49 poems and the most famous of Caeiro's works. The title is attributed to Caeiro, but some of the poems were first included in the collection by the literary critic Maria Aliete Galhoz.

The Shepherd in Love (Portuguese: O Pastor Amoroso) is a shorter sequence of poems. Under the Campos heteronym, Pessoa described it as "a futile interlude, but the few poems it contains are among the world's great love poems".

The Uncollected Poems (Portuguese: Poemas inconjuntos) is a collective name for Caeiro's other poems. According to Pessoa's in-universe writings, the title was created by Ricardo Reis.

Pessoa wrote introductions and critical commentaries to Caeiro's poems under other heteronyms. The first of these was by Mora, a heteronym Pessoa used for theoretical texts about paganism. There are more than 40 texts about Caeiro attributed to Reis, many of them fragmentary and likely intended as parts of prefaces. Campos' "Notes in Remembrance of My Master Caeiro" was published in Presença in 1931. Pessoa prepared material for promoting Caeiro's works in Europe, writing his own reviews and an English-language introduction under the name I. I. Crosse.

== Reception ==
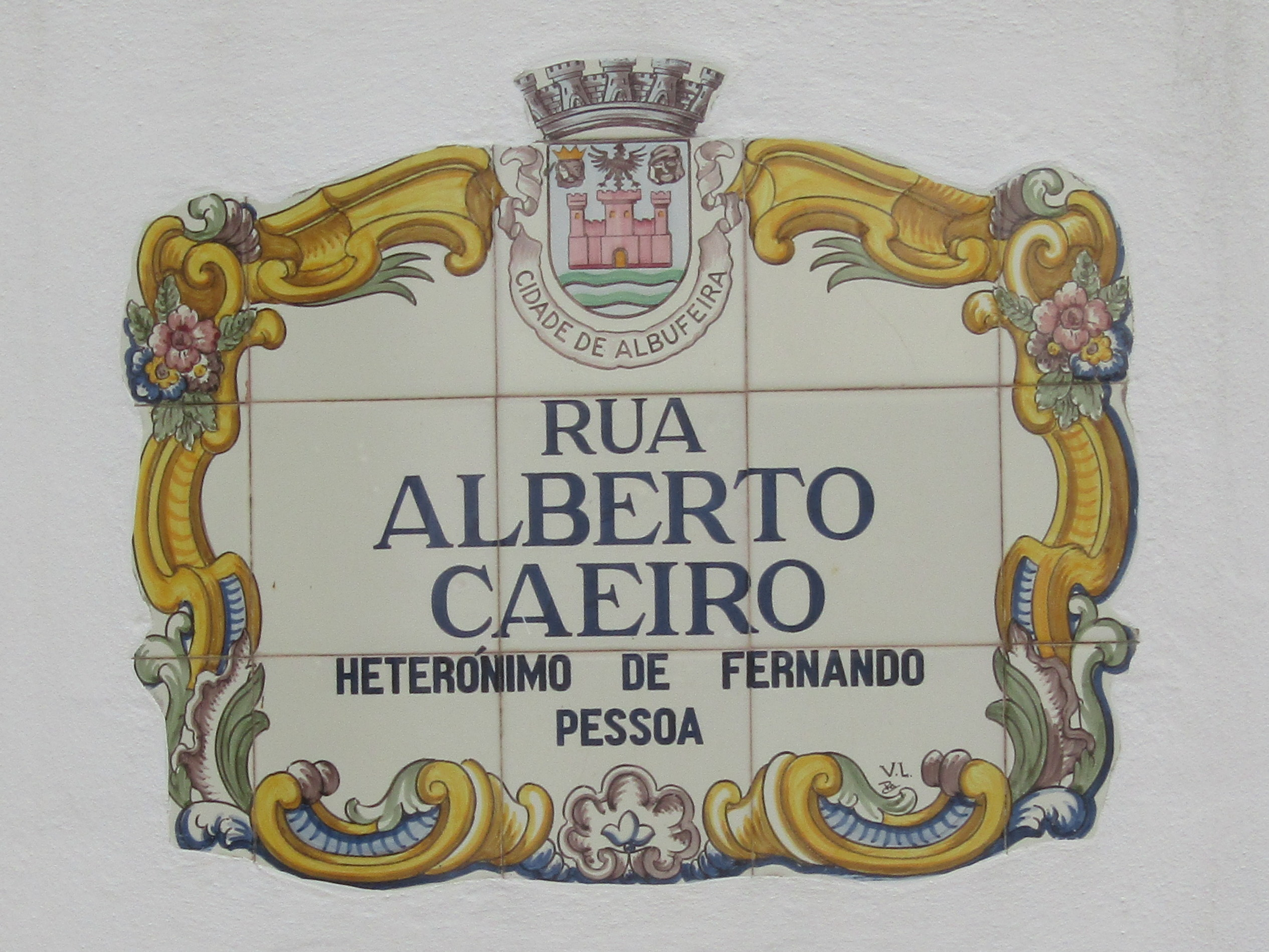
Tile street sign from Rua Alberto Caeiro in Albufeira, Portugal

Like with Pessoa's literary output in general, only a small portion of Caeiro's poetry was published in Pessoa's lifetime, and it took decades before it received significant recognition. Luís de Montalvor and João Gaspar Simões published the first collection of his poetry, Poemas de Alberto Caeiro, in Portugal in 1946. Several works with a focus on Caeiro have been published since then. In Brazil, Maria Aliete Galhoz edited an Obra poetica in 1960. Ivo Castro wrote a work on Caeiro in 1986 and published the first critical edition of his poems in 2015. Shearsman Books published Caeiro's poems in full in English interpretations by Chris Daniels in 2007 as The Collected Poems of Alberto Caeiro. Patricio Ferrari and Jerónimo Pizarro edited a Portuguese critical edition of Caeiro's collected poems and selected texts about Caeiro from Pessoa's other heteronyms that was published in 2016. A bilingual English-Portuguese version of this book was published by New Directions in 2020 as The Complete Works of Alberto Caeiro, with English interpretations by Margaret Jull Costa and Ferrari.

== Selected bibliography ==
- Pessoa, Fernando (2007). The Collected Poems of Alberto Caeiro. Translated by Daniels, Chris. Exeter: Shearsman Books. ISBN 978-1-905700-24-0.
- Pessoa, Fernando (2020). Pizarro, Jerónimo; Ferrari, Patricio (eds.). The Complete Works of Alberto Caeiro. Translated by Jull Costa, Margaret; Ferrari, Patricio. New York City: New Directions. ISBN 978-0-8112-2780-3.
