= The Year of the Death of Ricardo Reis =

1984 novel by José Saramago

- 1984 Portuguese edition (paperback)
- Author: José Saramago
- Original title: O Ano da Morte de Ricardo Reis
- Language: Portuguese
- Publisher: Editorial Caminho
- Publication date: 1984
- Publication place: Portugal

The Year of the Death of Ricardo Reis (Portuguese: O Ano da Morte de Ricardo Reis) is a 1984 novel by the Portuguese novelist José Saramago, who was awarded the 1998 Nobel Prize in Literature. The book chronicles the final year in the life of the title character, Ricardo Reis, one of the many heteronyms used by the Portuguese writer Fernando Pessoa.

In the novel, Ricardo Reis returns to Lisbon from Brazil, upon catching wind of Pessoa's death. While there, he chooses not to resume practicing medicine, but rather takes up residence in a hotel, where he wastes his days reading newspapers and wandering the streets of Lisbon.

The novel was translated into English by Giovanni Pontiero in 1991 and won the Independent Foreign Fiction Prize.

== Themes ==
The novel largely addresses its themes indirectly, with Reis struggling to clearly express his feelings on the events of the plot. For instance, he reads of the events leading to the Spanish Civil War and sees floods of Spanish immigrants arrive in Lisbon seeking refuge, but he never expresses strong feelings or even a cogent understanding of the meaning of the conflict.

Reis also carries on a lackluster love affair, but even in what seems to be his most intimate relationships, he is continually and voluntarily alienated from society.

The most revealing glimpse of Reis is through a series of conversations with the spirit of Fernando Pessoa, over the course of which Reis loses a clear concept of the nature of life and death and the difference between the two.

In the novel's final scene, Reis "dies" by calmly putting on his jacket and following Pessoa into the graveyard. Ultimately, the novel is a story of one man's attempt to resist any sort of cultural contextualization and reject any place in society whatsoever.

The book is also an exercise in meta-literature. Fernando Pessoa had created the character of Ricardo Reis fifty years or so prior to its release, giving him a biography and writing many poems under that name. That Saramago would place the two characters side by side underscores a deliberate blurring of the boundaries between fantasy and reality, a common theme in Saramago's work, and a rejection of traditional limitations on narrative practices. Reis spends much of his time reading a novel called The God of the Labyrinth, a fictional novel mentioned by the writer Jorge Luis Borges and attributed to the title character of his short story "An Examination of the Work of Herbert Quain".

== Style ==
The Year of the Death of Ricardo Reis is written in Saramago's distinctive style, which disregards the traditional use of punctuation, except for commas and periods, and which denotes dialogue and changes in the speaker using only capital letters. Saramago uses long, flowing sentences and paragraphs often several pages in length. Saramago also digresses from the story frequently, occasionally even in the first person, remarking philosophically on the significance of images, objects, or situations encountered in the story. Saramago’s writing technique often has strong magical-realist elements.
