= Mensagem =

1934 book of poetry by Fernando Pessoa

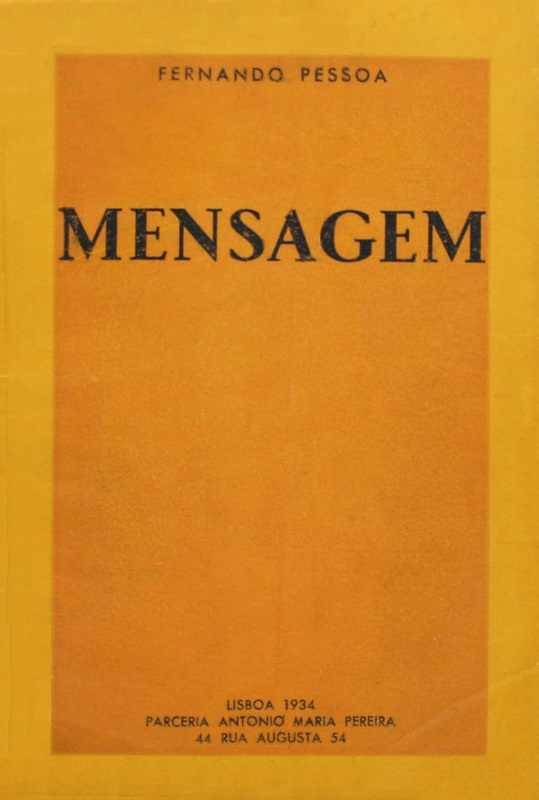
- First edition 1934
- Author: Fernando Pessoa
- Language: Portuguese
- Genre: Poetry
- Published: 1934
- Publisher: Parceria António Maria Pereira
- Publication date: 1934
- Publication place: Portugal
- Pages: 76
- ISBN: 9781794710177

Mensagem is a book by Portuguese writer Fernando Pessoa. It is composed of 44 poems, and was called the "livro pequeno de poemas" or the "little book of poems". It was published in 1934 by Parceria António Maria Pereira. The book was awarded, in the same year, with the Prémio Antero de Quental in the poem category by the Secretariado Nacional de Informação of the Estado Novo.

Mensagem was published just one year before the death of the author, and is about the past of Portugal. In particular it contemplates the ancient grandeur of Portugal, and glorifies above all the style of Luís de Camões, the author of Os Lusíadas, and the Portuguese discoveries. It points to these people and events as ones which Pessoa believed could regenerate, or return Portugal to its past greatness.

== Creation ==
The original title of the book was Portugal. However a friend of Pessoa convinced him that "Mensagem" would be a more appropriate title as "Portugal" had already been widely used with common products. Pessoa liked the word "mensagem" because of the expression in Latin: Mens agitat molem, meaning, "the spirit moves matter" a phrase from the epic poem The Aeneid by Vergil, said by Anchises when he was explaining the Universe to Aeneas. Pessoa did not use the original meaning of the quote which is of the existence of a universal principle from which emanate all beings. According to a letter dated to 13 January 1935 to Adolfo Casais Monteiro, Mensagem was the first book that Pessoa was able to complete.
