= Martin Lüdke =

German literary critic (born 1943)

Martin Lüdke (born April 9, 1943 in Apolda, Thuringia) is a German literary critic.

== Life ==
After graduating from the Frankfurt Goethe-Gymnasium, Lüdke initially began an apprenticeship in a shipping firm, but left to study philosophy, sociology, German studies and politics at the University of Frankfurt. He earned his doctorate with a dissertation on "Die Differenz von Kunstschönem und Naturschönem bei Kant, Hegel und Adorno" (The distinction between the artistically beautiful and the naturally beautiful in Kant, Hegel and Adorno).

From 1976 to 1978 he was a research assistant at the Bundeswehr Institute of Social Sciences (German: Sozialwissenschaftliches Institut der Bundeswehr, SOWI) in Munich. He then held the chair in German literature at the University of Frankfurt until 1984 and from 1985 to 1990 was literary editor for television at Hessischer Rundfunk. During this time he also held visiting professorships at several American universities (Los Angeles, San Diego, and St. Louis). Since 2003 he has regularly taught as a courtesy professor at the University of Florida in Gainesville.

In 1990 he moved from Hessischer Rundfunk to Südwestfunk, which later became Südwestrundfunk, where he initially headed the editorial board of SWR Bestenliste, its monthly coverage of the best new books, and later the series Literatur im Foyer (now lesenswert) in Mainz, which also airs on 3sat. Until 1998, he co-edited the Rowohlt Verlag literary magazine.

Lüdke has been a juror for several literary awards, including the Leipzig Book Fair Prize and, in 2009, the German Book Prize. He also makes regular appearances on the radio program Streitfall, discussing new non-fiction books with Peter Kemper, an editor at the hr2 culture channel of Hessischer Rundfunk, Franziska Augstein, and Micha Brumlik in the Frankfurt Literaturhaus. He writes mainly for Die Zeit, Der Spiegel, and Frankfurter Rundschau and for Literaturen and Focus magazines. He has been a member of the PEN Center Germany since 1994.

Martin Lüdke lives in Frankfurt am Main. He is married, and is an "avid jogger".
