= Portuguese poetry =

Poetic writings produced in Portuguese

Portuguese poetry refers to diverse kinds of poetic writings produced in Portuguese. The article covers historical accounts of poetry from other countries where Portuguese or variations of the language are spoken. The article covers Portuguese poetry produced from the Middle Ages (12th century) to the present era.

== History ==
=== Middle Ages ===
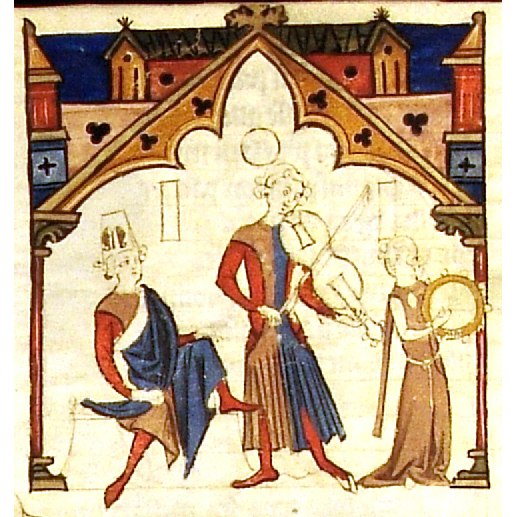
Portuguese troubadours

The beginnings of Portuguese poetry go back to the early 12th century, around the time when the County of Portugal separated from the medieval Kingdom of Galicia in the northwest of the Iberian Peninsula. It was in this region that the ancestral language of both modern Portuguese and modern Galician, known today as Galician-Portuguese, was the common language of the people. Like the troubadour culture in the Iberian Peninsula and the rest of Europe, Galician-Portuguese poets sang the love for a woman, which often turned into personal insults, as she had hurt her lover's pride. However, this region produced a specific type of song, known as cantigas de amigo (songs of a friend). In these, the lyrical subject is always a woman (though the singer was male) talking about her friend (lover) from whom she has been separated - by war or other activities - as shown in the Reconquista. They discuss the loneliness that the woman feels. But some poems also project eroticism, or confess the lover's meeting in a secret place, often through a dialogue she has with her mother or with natural elements (such could be considered a custom adapted from the pagan peoples in the region). Epic poetry was also produced, as was common in Romantic medieval regions (Gesta de D. Afonso Henriques, of unknown authorship). With the Portuguese expansion south, poetry preserved some of these main characteristics - cantigas de amigo were written even by kings, like Denis of Portugal.

=== Renaissance ===
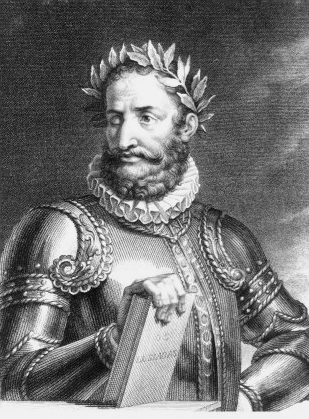
Painting of Luís de Camões

But it was with the Renaissance that poets embarked on a new age of literature due to influences from Italy and the peculiar experience of the Portuguese discoveries. Sá de Miranda (1481–1558) introduced the sonnet, which became, until today, a very common form. But his lyrical works (he also wrote plays) never abandoned traditional forms. He displays a certain antipathy to rapid changes in social structure and values. Bernardim Ribeiro (1482?–1536?) made use of bucolic poetry, singing about love fatalistically (he is more renowned, however, for his prose work Menina e Moça). In the next generation, António Ferreira (1528–1569), making a wide use of classical forms, expresses the same antipathy related to the detriment of society, but with a pedagogical purpose. This was also the time of António Gonçalves de Bandarra (1500–1566), a cobbler who learned to read despite his low social status, and who read the Bible. His songs can be considered the birth of sebastianism, a central theme of Portuguese culture. The Portuguese expansion also gave birth to epic poetry. Jerónimo Corte-Real, with his O Segundo Cerco de Diu (The Second Siege of Diu) should be mentioned, but his classic influence is not well defined. But the great poet, both of lyric and epic, is, unquestionably, Luís de Camões (1525?-1580). He talks about love, the passing of time and world's agitation, using a fine formal dominion, expressing his duality in relation to a platonic view of the world, and a skepticism regarding injustice, the passing of time and the complexity of love. He wrote what is considered the most important poem of Portuguese Literature, Os Lusíadas (The Lusiads), singing the maritime voyage of Vasco da Gama from Lisbon to India. The duality between man and the divine, awareness of the importance of the Portuguese discoveries to the formation of modern world, history of Portugal, the notion of Portugal's social and ideological problems, belief in the evolution on mankind, this is all among the poem's verses.

After this period of national pride, the dark years of the Philippine Dynasty saw a continuation of epic production, which, however, did not equal Camões. Poems from this era may be seen as a resistance to foreign domination. Significant authors include: Luís Brandão (Elegíaca), Rodrigues Lobo (Condestrabre), Vasco Mouzinho de Quevedo (Afonso Africano), Sá de Meneses (Malaca Conquistada), Gabriel de Castro (Ulisseia), António Macedo (Ulissipo). Such epic cycle ended with the poem Viriato Trágico, by Brás Garcia de Mascarenhas, who fought in the Portuguese Restoration War. In the 17th century, poets had their liberty constrained by the Portuguese Inquisition. Among other factors, one could see this period as a decline on Portuguese poetry, where the lack of autonomy and subjects is noted. This may well be seen as a crisis of Portuguese identity in a world to which they do not seem to have adapted. Such crisis was transferred, in the 17th century, to the Arcádia Lusitânia. This academy made the transition, through Manuel du Bocage (1765–1805), to Romanticism.

=== Romanticism ===
But only with Almeida Garrett (1799–1854), with his poem Camões, can we consider that Romanticism, and its following consequences, became established in Portugal. Crises made national cultural factors collapse: romantic nostalgia was applied to Portuguese decline, the rest of Europe being considered the real focus of civilization. This complex of inferiority (which did not abolish a complex of superiority) became extremely incisive with the Realistic generation, the Geração de 70. In poetry, Antero de Quental (1842–1891) was one of the most remarkable Portuguese poets of the 19th century – he introduced what can be considered as philosophical poetry, which expresses sadness and horror due to a lack of sense in life (leading him to commit suicide). Guerra Junqueiro (1850–1923) and João de Deus (1830–1896) should also be considered in this period.

In the symbolist movement, a major figure was Camilo Pessanha (1867–1926). His works reflects his journey to Asia. Related to impressionism, Cesário Verde (1855–1886) was ignored during his short life by literary circles. O Sentimento de um Ocidental ("The Feeling of a Westerner") is his masterpiece, in which the poet describes a night in the streets of Lisbon with his absurda necessidade de sofrer (absurd need for suffering).

This moment was brief, nevertheless, and Modernism was about to come.

=== Modernism ===
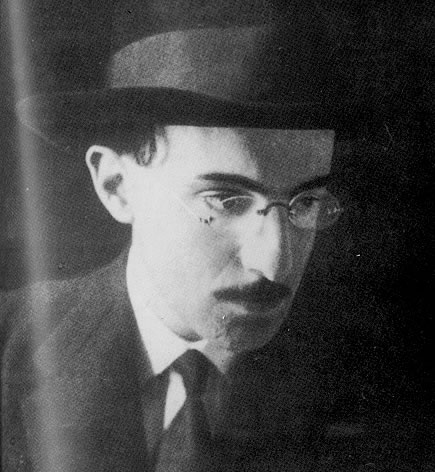
Photo of Fernando Pessoa

Mystical poetry included Teixeira de Pascoaes (1877–1952) as an example and Futurism included Mário de Sá-Carneiro. Modernism was also responsible for the liberation of the complexity of the Portuguese view of themselves (at least in regard to poetry), mainly thanks to Fernando Pessoa (1888–1935), the second great Portuguese poet. He had a unique and complex personality, and he wrote under many names, not pseudonyms, but what he named as heteronyms: each heteronym had its own personality, way of writing and biography. The most renowned are: Alberto Caeiro, considered the master of them all, positivist and bucolic, Ricardo Reis, pagan and epicurist (but with stoical influence), Fernando Pessoa's autonym, trapped in his interior labyrinth and tedium, Álvaro de Campos, futurist, and Bernardo Soares, who wrote Livro do Desassosego (Book of Disquiet). Fernando Pessoa Mensagem (Message) is a sebastianist poem formed of a series of smaller ones. The Portuguese cultural handicap, with its interior antagonisms and non adapted presence in the modern world, appear questioned and dealt with according to the Portuguese feeling of existence and life. Later on, through the 20th century, despite living under a dictatorship, Portuguese poets were able to use Pessoa's legacy to create a corpus of diverse poetic expression. Some names to be mentioned are: Miguel Torga, José Régio, Sophia de Mello Breyner Andresen, Eugénio de Andrade, Florbela Espanca, António Gedeão and Herberto Hélder.

== Late 20th and 21st century ==
Prior to the Carnation Revolution in 1974, many poets and lyricists created works known as revolutionary songs. Composers who represented the spirit of the revolution include Zeca Afonso and Sérgio Godinho; and poets who are considered influential for their revolutionary works include Ary dos Santos and Manuel Alegre. During the 21st century, Portuguese poets have continued to create notable works of literature. Such names include Vasco Graça Moura (1942), Ana Luísa Amaral (1956) and Gonçalo M. Tavares (1970).

== Gallery of Portuguese poets ==
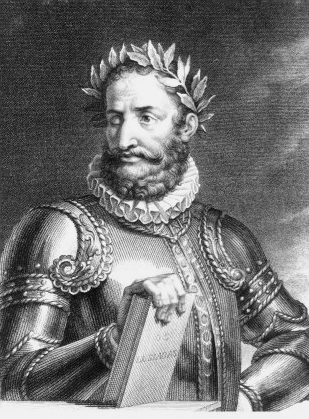

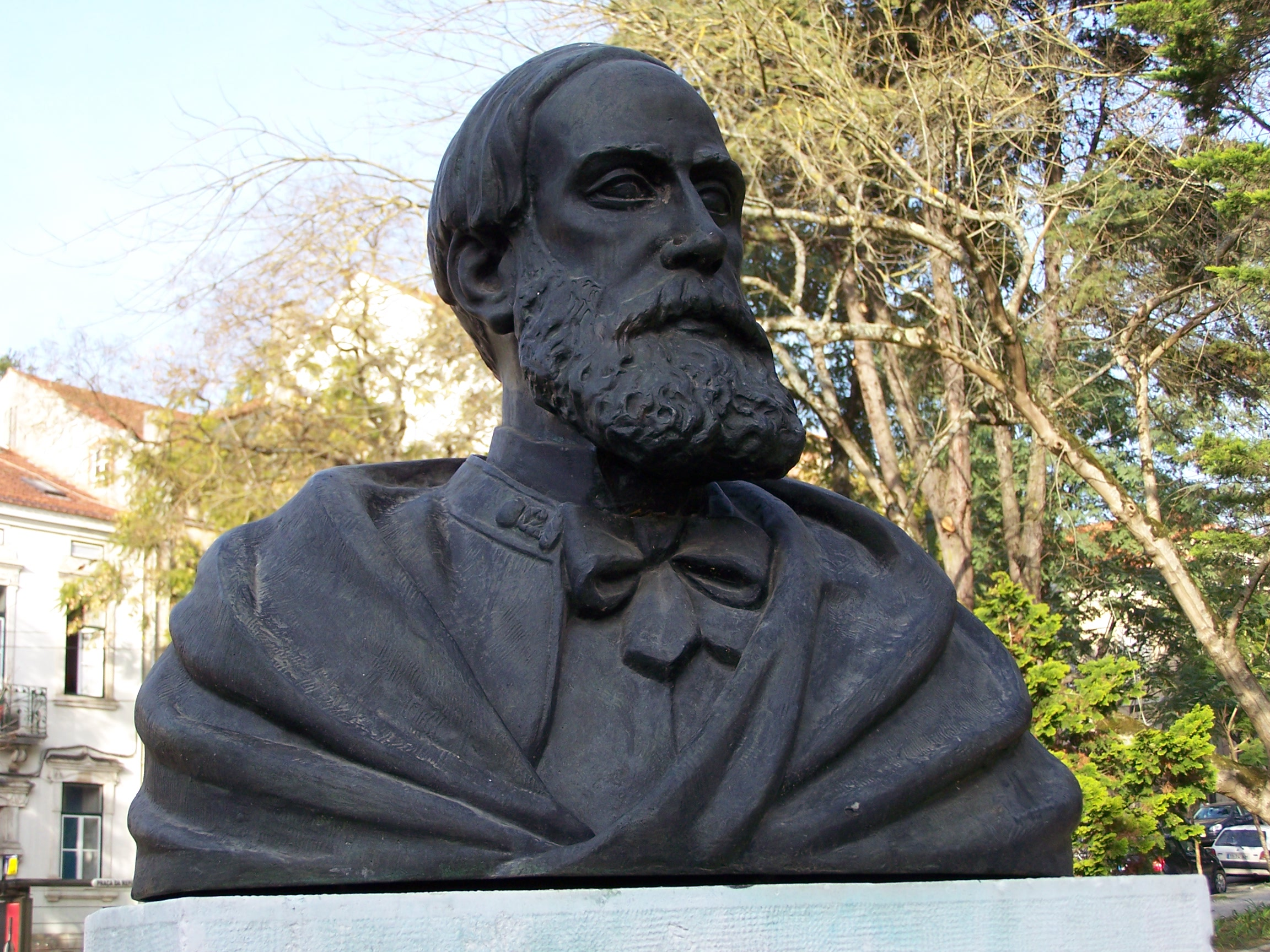

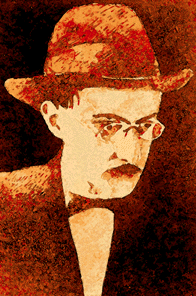

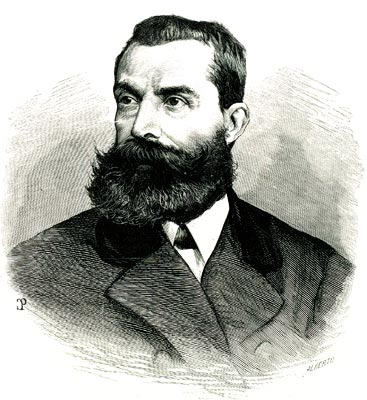

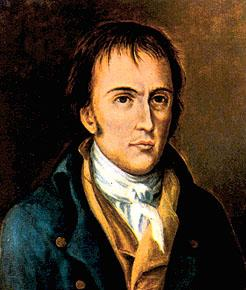

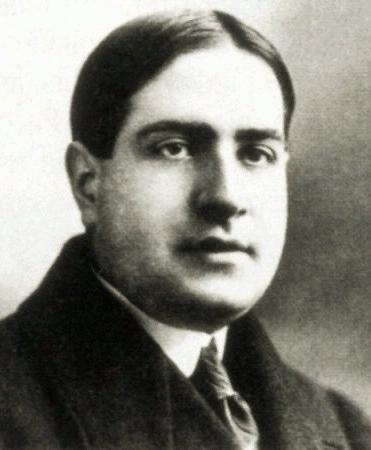

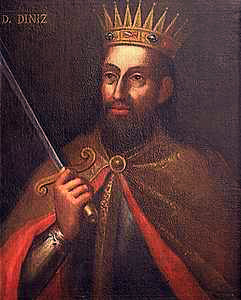

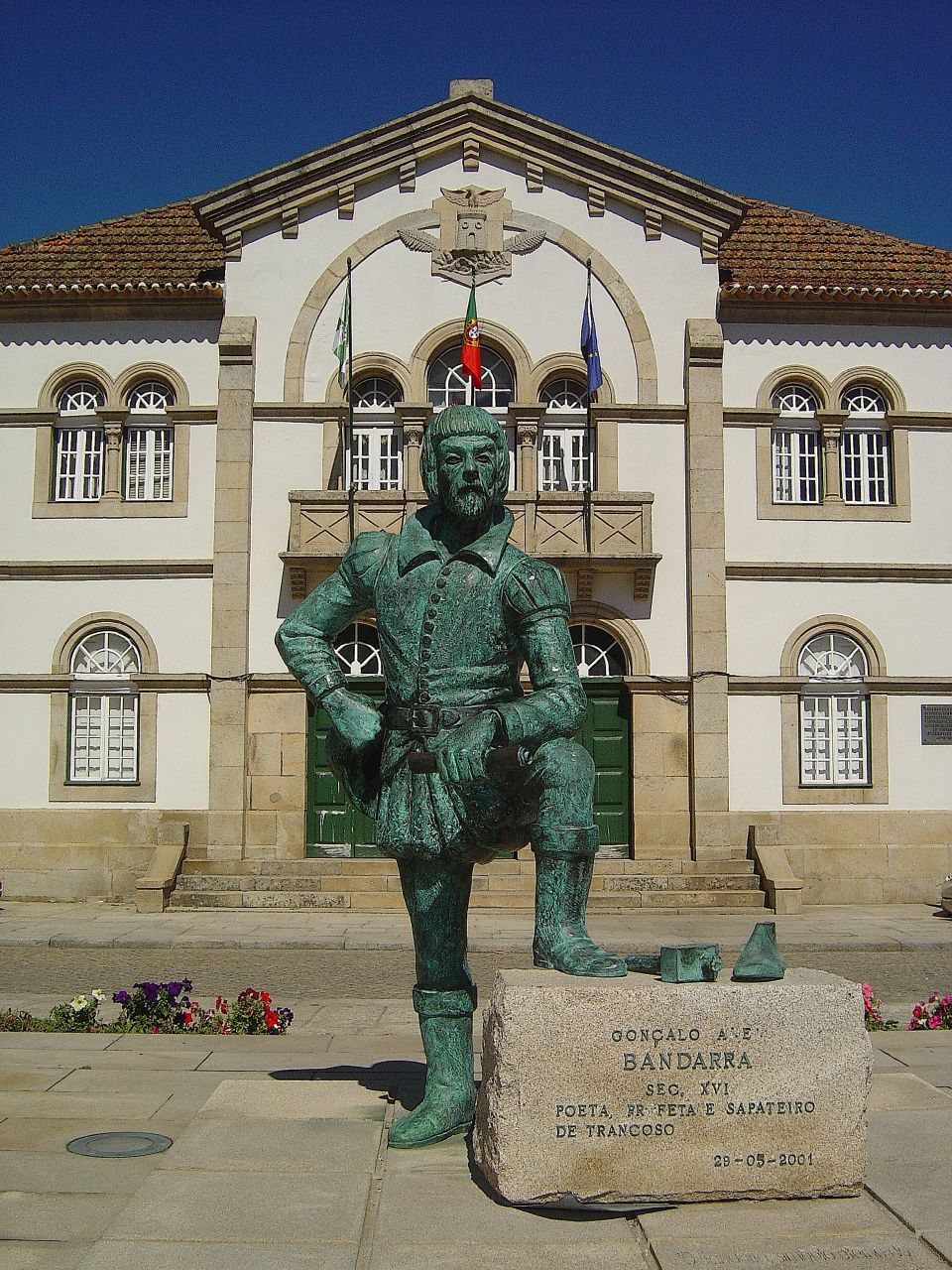

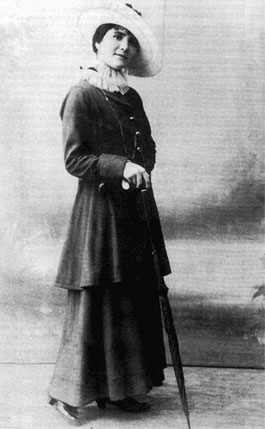

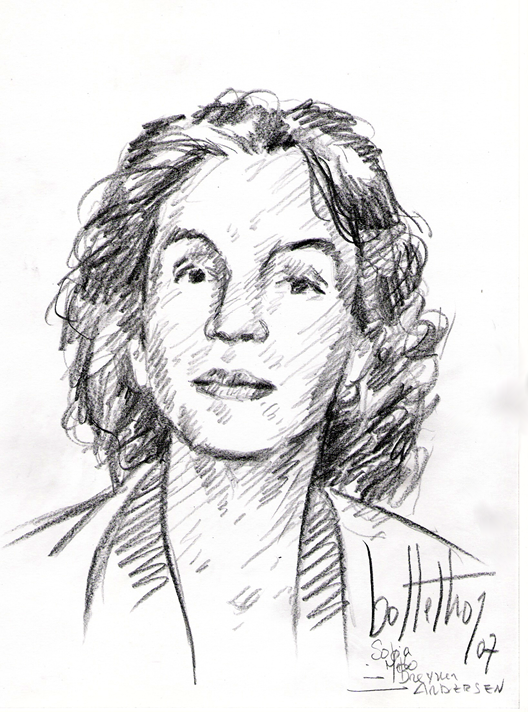

== See also ==
- Galician-Portuguese
- List of Portuguese language poets
- Portuguese language
- Portuguese literature
