= Cesário Verde =

Portuguese poet (1855–1896)

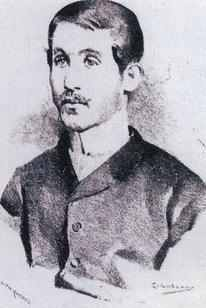
- Born: José Joaquim Cesário Verde; 25 February 1855; Lisbon, Portugal
- Died: 19 July 1886 (aged 31); Lisbon, Portugal
- Occupation: Poet

Cesário Verde (25 February 1855 – 19 July 1886) was a 19th-century Portuguese poet. His work, while mostly ignored during his lifetime and not well known outside of the country's borders even today, is generally considered to be amongst the most important in Portuguese poetry and is widely taught in schools. This is partly due to his being championed by many other authors after his death, notably Fernando Pessoa.

== Biography ==
José Joaquim Cesário Verde was born in Lisbon, Portugal. His father was a shopkeeper and exporter of fruit products. He also had a small farm on the outskirts, at which Verde's family resided during the summer. In 1857, an outbreak of the plague lead his father to permanently move the family to the country, where they lived until coming back to Lisbon in 1865. This early contact with the countryside instilled in Verde a deep love of nature, which would show up repeatedly in his poems about life in the country, almost always depicted in a bucolic, idyllic light.

Verde, the oldest of four children, started working at his father's shop at an early age; all accounts of his family life point towards him having been brought up in a household that mostly cherished the middle class work ethic. In 1872, his sister Julia died of tuberculosis – the grief over this loss is considered by many critics to have had a big impact on his literary work, as his poems frequently deal with the sickly, often portrayed in the guise of beautiful, innocent women. The autobiographical poem “Nós” makes explicit mention of his sister's death.

Not much is known of his academic pursuits, though he did enroll in an institute of higher learning in 1873; he dropped out, however, before completing any of his exams. The tenure did result in him meeting Silva Pinto, who would go on to become his lifelong friend and, after his death, the publisher of his works. In the same year, he made public his first poems, in the local paper Diário de Notícias. It would prove to be the first of about forty to be released in various publications during his lifetime. During his life, Verde carried on the commercial profession of his father, only dedicating himself to poetry in his free time.

In 1874, he published the poem “Esplêndida”, which garnered him a negative review by the noted Portuguese critic and social commentator Ramalho Ortigão. In his satirical magazine As Farpas: Ortigão remarked that the young poet should show himself "more Cesário, less Verde" ("verde" in Portuguese meaning "unripe", i.e. inexperienced, and the mention of “Cesário” being a play on Verde's name descending from the Roman Caesar.) This deeply hurt Verde, who in fact during his lifetime would frequently complain about the indifference which greeted his work – though he and Ortigão would later become friends.

In 1877, Verde for the first time showed symptoms associated with tuberculosis, the same illness that killed his sister and that, in 1882, also sent his brother, Joaquim Tomás, to the grave. During these latter years, his interest in writing also diminished. His health deteriorated steadily. He died on July 19, 1886, in Lisbon.

== Poetic profile ==
Cesário Verde is frequently hailed as both one of Portugal's finest urban poets and one of the country's greatest describers of the countryside. Thus, Verde's poems (always written in the alexandrine structure) are mostly split into “city poems” and “countryside poems” (the few that escape these two categories dealing with love, often scorned.)

Cesário Verde's city poems are often described as bohemian, decadent and socially aware. He is hailed as Portugal's first great realist poet, frequently dealing with scenes of poverty, disease and moral decay. His poems also frequently deal with spleen and ennui. In "O Sentimento dum Ocidental" ("The Feeling of a Westerner"), Verde captures the atmosphere of decadence then growing in Portuguese society, comparing the past discoveries and expeditions of Portugueses sailors, as well as the works of national poet Luís de Camões, to the present. He also expresses a longing to experience a larger world beyond the city, pining for “Madrid, Paris, Berlim, S. Petersburgo, o mundo!” (“Madrid, Paris, Berlin, St. Petersburg, the world!”)

While the city is corrupt and decaying, the countryside in Verde's poetry is described as lively, fertile and full of beauty. Even the growing industrialization of agriculture isn't seen as a worrying factor, as this passage from “De Verão” (“In The Summer”) shows:

“E perguntavas sobre os últimos inventos
Agrícolas. Que aldeias tão lavadas!
Bons ares! Boa luz! Bons alimentos!
Olha: os saloios vivos, corpulentos
Como nos fazem grandes barretadas”

(“And you asked about the latest inventions
In agriculture. What well-washed villages!
Good airs! Good light! Good food!
Look: the countrymen alive, corpulent
What great hat-drops they give us!”)

The autobiographical poem “Nós” gives an idyllic description of Verde’s youth living on the farm – latter poems show the countryside as the peaceful setting for picnics, and as an opportunity for long walks with female companionship. Whilst in his “city” poems Verde describes spleen and disease, in his descriptions of the countryside the protagonists are often strong, happy and robust.

== Influences and legacy ==
In his poetry, Cesário Verde references Balzac, Baudelaire and Herbert Spencer. His letters also contain quotes from Victor Hugo, Flaubert, Taine and Quinet. On a national level, the authors referenced are Luís de Camões and João de Deus.

Although he was never very celebrated during his lifetime, Verde did socialize with many of the country’s foremost literary figures (some of these meetings may be attributed to Verde’s republican sympathies, then highly in vogue amongst the country’s intellectuals.) Fialho de Almeida is said to have greatly admired him, and other acquaintances include Guerra Junqueiro, Ramalho Ortigão, Gomes Leal, João de Deus, Abel Botelho and the painter Rafael Bordalo Pinheiro.

After his death, Verde’s reputation has steadily grown. He was particularly embraced by Portuguese modernists such as Mário de Sá-Carneiro and Fernando Pessoa (whose heteronyms Álvaro de Campos, Alberto Caeiro and Bernardo Soares praise Verde.) More modern admirers include Eugénio de Andrade and Adolfo Casais Monteiro

== Published work ==
During his lifetime, Cesário Verde published around forty poems in various papers. After his death, his friend Silva Pinto published “The Book Of Cesário Verde”, collecting his poems. The first edition was published in April 1887 – two hundred copies were printed, to be dispensed as gifts only. The compilation was only made available commercially in 1901. More recent editions have respected the order in which the poems were first compiled, but added others that weren’t included in the first selection. The book now includes Verde’s entire poetic oeuvre.
