= The Feeling of a Westerner =

Long poem by Cesário Verde

- by Cesário Verde
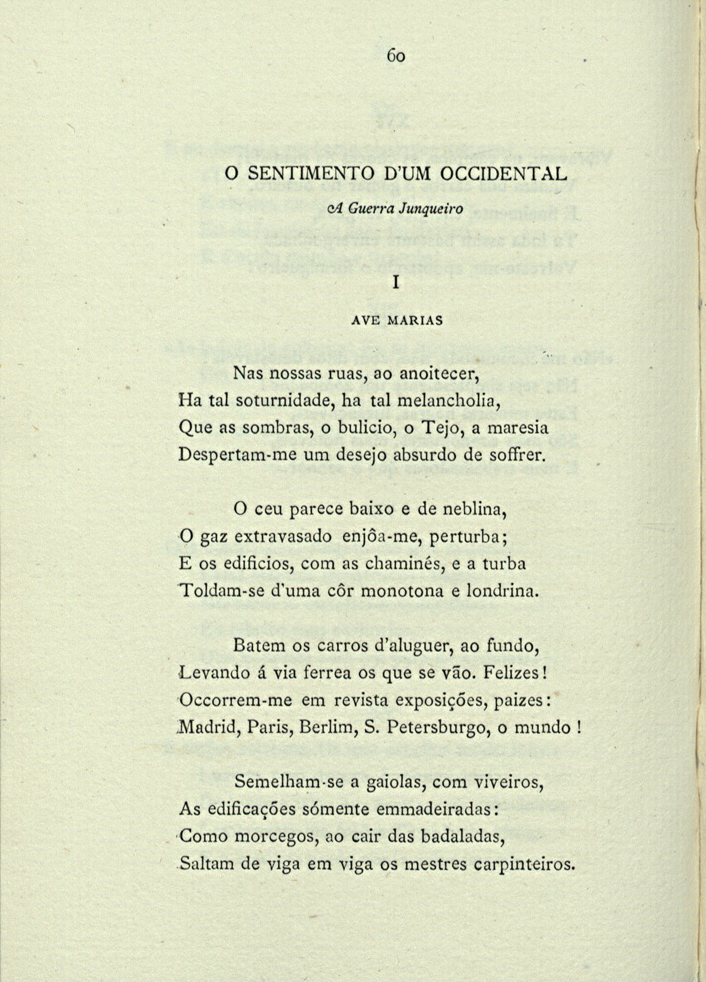
- First page of the poem's 1887 edition
- Original title: O Sentimento dum Ocidental (Note: The title was originally spelled as O Sentimento d'um Occidental in the first edition, published before the 1911 spelling reform.)
- Written: 1880
- First published in: O Livro de Cesário Verde (1887)
- Country: Portugal
- Language: Portuguese
- Form: Narrative poem
- Meter: Quatrains of 1 decasyllable followed by 3 alexandrines
- Publisher: Silva Pinto
- Publication date: 1887
- Lines: 176

"O Sentimento dum Ocidental", published in English as "The Feeling of a Westerner" is a long poem written by Portuguese poet Cesário Verde (1855–1886). It is today considered Verde's masterpiece and one of the foremost Portuguese poems of the 19th century.

A narrative poem, it illustrates the multiplicity of the urban spaces in Lisbon—the paradigm of an ostensible national progress—and how they were lived, as the poetic persona, a flâneur in the manner of Baudelaire, shares his experience of contemplating the urban crowd while walking across the city. The description of the transformations of the social and physical landscape hints at the social malaise by focusing on the human pain and hardship that are commonplace around the city. Because the poem evokes, at times, a glorious national past only as a counterpoint to modern decadence, some critics like Eduardo Lourenço have referred to it as a "counter-epopee", a subversion of the epic poetry genre.

It was first published in the newspaper Jornal de Viagens in 1880 and was later included in the posthumous compilation of Cesário Verde's poetry (O Livro de Cesário Verde, 1887).

== Historical context ==
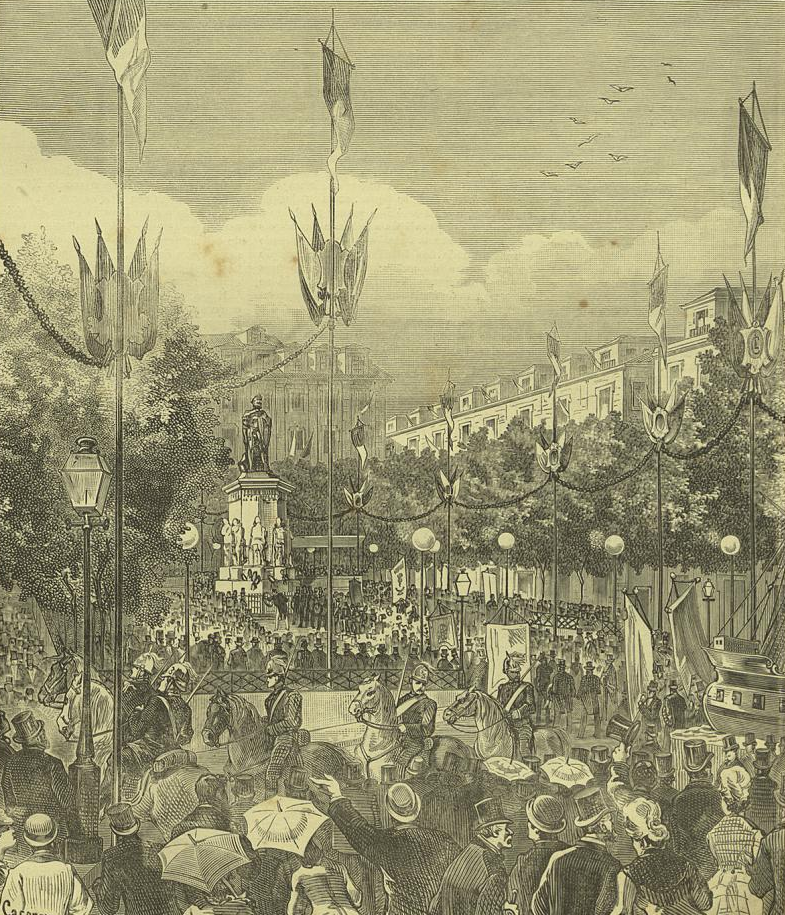
The celebrations of the tricentennial of the death of Luís de Camões, in Lisbon, 1880

"The Feeling of a Westerner" was first published in a special edition of the newspaper Jornal de Viagens, on 10 June 1880, during the official tricentennial celebrations of the death of national poet Luís de Camões. The patriotic celebrations were led by a committee of several eminent men of letters associated with the journalistic field, and were in line with Comte's prevalent positivist ideological trends of the time: they were to serve as a civic and patriotic movement that could wake the Portuguese public spirit and make the people understand modern social ideals.

The celebrations evoked a Romanticised Camões as "a symbol of all the aspirations of the Portuguese nation, its glories and tragedies" (in the words of Teófilo Braga), a paradigm of the "heroic age" of the nation that had since fallen into insurmountable social, political, and financial instability; at the same time, the celebrations were highly politicised by the Republican cause, then highly in vogue amongst the country's intellectuals.

"The Feeling of a Westerner" was one of the many literary works produced and published at the time to celebrate Camões. Cesário Verde deliberately opted not to adopt the stance of defending a political cause with the obvious moral judgements and beliefs in an ideal future that were found in other contemporary poems: the personal reflection on isolated fragments of human existence, the sad decadent reality of the state of Portuguese society, was not in keeping with the nationalist exaltation and political propaganda produced by his peers. This perhaps explains why it was found unremarkable by contemporary critics (Verde would bemoan, on a letter to António de Macedo Papança, that "a recent poem of mine, published in a widely-circulated periodical in celebration of Camões, did not receive a considered glance, a smile, a note of scorn, an observation!"), the scant critical attention it garnered was negative. Instead of the prevailing praise of modernism and progress, The Feeling of a Westerner satirises progress as a myth and shows the moral pessimism found in contemporaries Dostoevsky and the Decadentist poets.

Verde's Parnassian lyric would only be embraced and popularised many years following his death in 1886 at the age of 31, by Portuguese Modernists such as Mário de Sá-Carneiro and Fernando Pessoa (whose heteronyms Álvaro de Campos, Alberto Caeiro and Bernardo Soares praise Verde).

== Analysis and interpretation ==
=== Structure ===
"The Feeling of a Westerner" is a first-person monologue written in quatrains of one decasyllable followed by three Alexandrines, structured in enclosed rhyme. It is a long poem, 176 lines in length.

The poem is divided into four sections, each with 11 verses; in the posthumously published O Livro de Cesário Verde (1887), the sections are given titles that point to the passage of time as night sets in: "Vespers" (Avé-Marias), "After Dark" (Noite Fechada), "By Gaslight" (Ao Gás), and "The Dead Hours" (Horas Mortas).

The 1887 edition also includes a dedication, to fellow poet Guerra Junqueiro.

=== Narrative ===
While Verde's "The Feeling of a Westerner" is a homage to national poet Luís de Camões on the tricentennial of his death, it makes only passing reference to him: once by name in a reference to the heroic episode in which a shipwrecked Camões on the Mekong Delta swam ashore while holding aloft the manuscript of his still-unfinished epic ("Shipwrecked Camões swims his book to shore!", line 23) — a recollection of a gallant tale that is immediately counterpointed by the presence of an English battleship docked nearby (a symbol of the loss of national importance); and once as "a war-sized monument cast in bronze / [that] stands, on a pillar, for an epic that was!" (lines 67–68), referring to the Camões Monument in the Chiado neighbourhood. The conspicuous absence of Camões carries expressive intent:

"The figure of Camões, the "epic that was", has been turned into a cold "statue" among vulgar public benches and pepper trees. The military have lost their pride of yore, and exist only to serve the mediocrity of the establishment. [...] The clash between that which Cesário wishes reality was and that which he feels it is becomes apparent, he cannot conceal it as much as he would like to correctly celebrate the epic poet."

==== Vespers ====
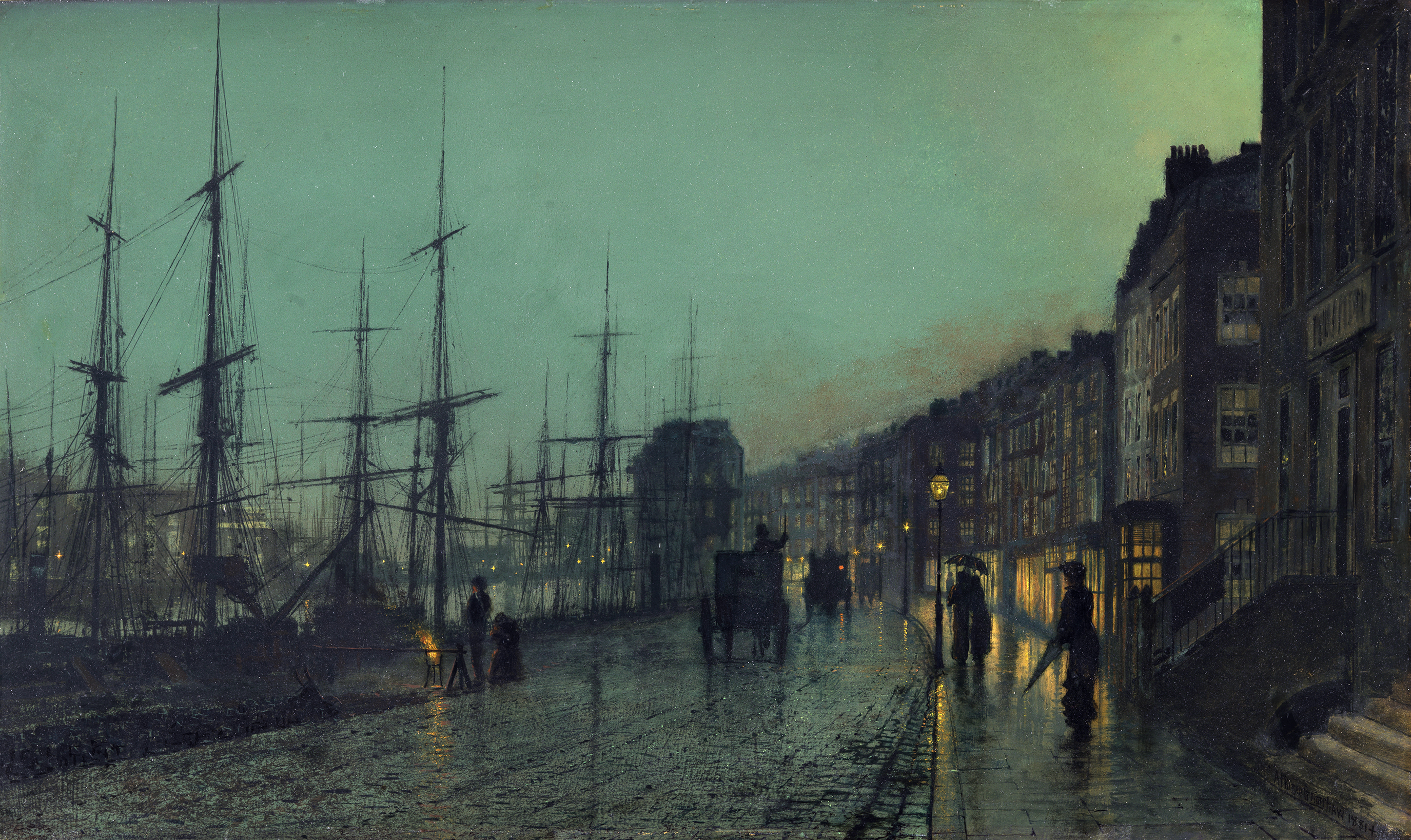
Shipping on the Clyde, John Atkinson Grimshaw, 1881

The poem narrates a lonely evening stroll undertaken by the poetic persona, a flâneur. As he does so, he describes his surroundings; not only the physical but also the social landscape, with special focus on the scenes of human hardship.

The poem opens with "Vespers", as dusk begins to fall and the city is cloaked in shadows, the narrator is overcome with a surge of melancholy that gives him "an absurd desire to suffer". By the Tagus riverfront, he observes the bustle of the crowd and it makes the narrator's mind wander: the hired coaches that take people to the railway station make the narrator fantasise about foreign cities, exhibitions, modernity; the dirty workers leaving the shipyards evoke by contrast the glorious past of Portugal during the Age of Discovery, in the days of Luís de Camões, when carracks would depart from Lisbon to explore the unknown.

The sight, however, of an English battleship docking nearby disturbs him, and makes him suddenly aware of the sounds of life around him: china and flatware clinking at dinner in nearby fashionable hotels, people arguing inside streetcars, street performers struggling on stilts, children peering above from balconies, and bored shopkeepers counting the minutes until closing time. A group of raucous, manly fishwives who had been unloading coal on frigates make their way home to their impoverished, disease-stricken neighbourhood, rocking inside their baskets infant sons "who'll one day drown in storms".

==== After Dark ====
In the second section, "After Dark", all that was left of the afternoon is gone. As the narrator passes the Aljube jail, the prisoners therein — miserable old women and children, no person of status in sight — bang on the bars of their cells. As the city lights up with the reflections of bright cafés, restaurants, and shops, the sight of the nearby Cathedral only serves to increase the narrator's discomfort. The foreboding "black, funereal spectre" of the crosses, the tolling bells, and the churches harkens to the days of the Inquisition and its persecutions: the thought alone makes him physically ill.

Passing through the Baixa, a part of town that had been rebuilt from scratch after the 1755 Lisbon earthquake, he feels walled in by the assemblage of equal, perpendicular buildings surrounded by steep, uphill streets on all sides; here and there, there are vulgar public squares where people are shrunk by old bronze monuments to forgotten heroes (a reference to the Camões Monument, in Chiado).

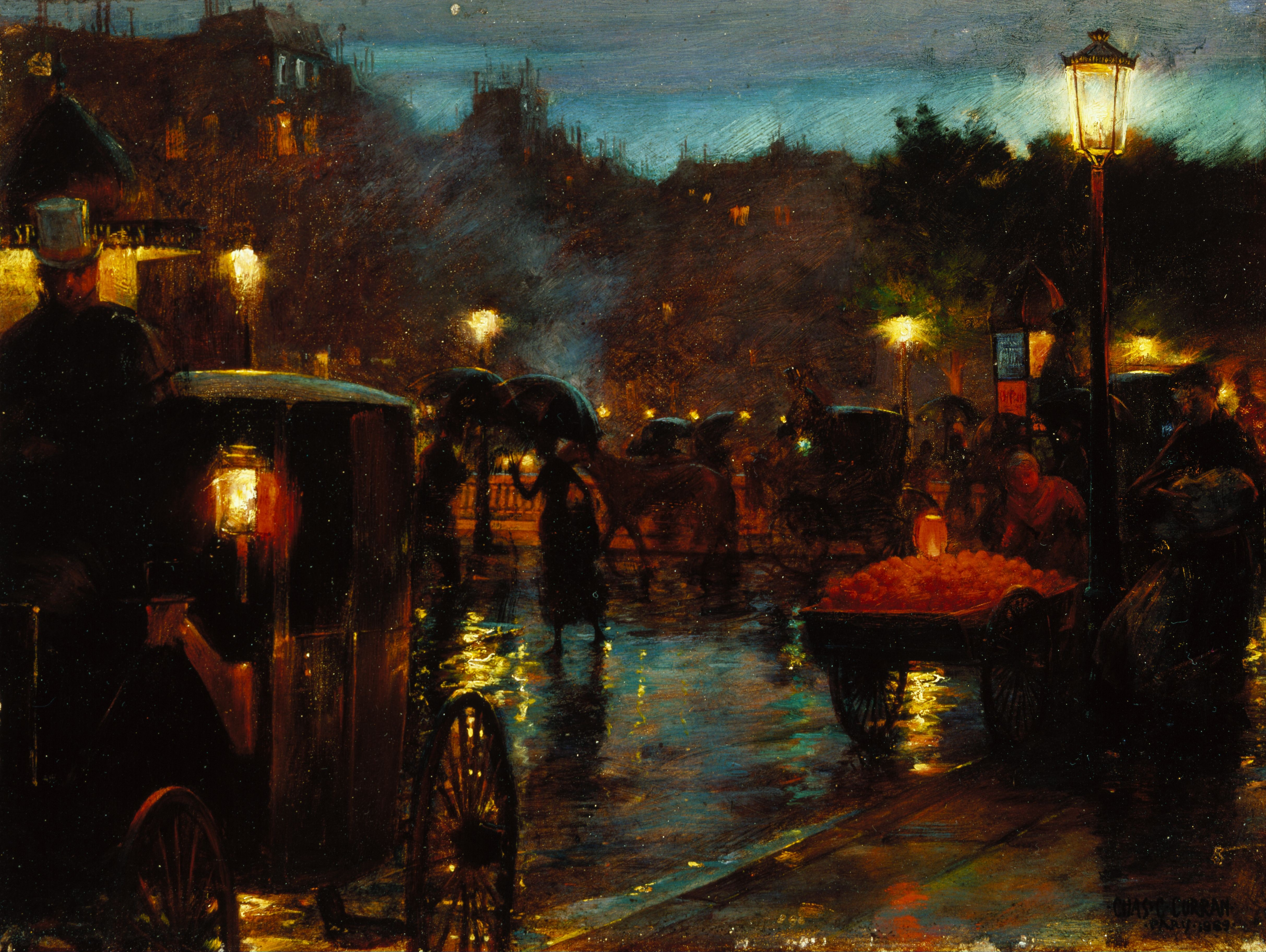
Paris at Night, Charles Courtney Curran, 1889

The narrow and oppressive environment, the social collapse ("A gleaming palace stands opposite a hovel", line 72), the old convents turned military barracks (a reference to Carmo Convent) remind him not of progress, but of the Middle Ages, of disease and insecurity. The narrator is saddened by the sight of the city: as he spies elegant ladies smiling and shopping for jewels, he also sees miserable florists and seamstresses coming down from their shops, exhausted, marching to the theatres where they'll work that night as walk-ons and chorus girls in order to make ends meet. He retreats into a brasserie and watches as the immigrants sit, oblivious, laughing and playing dominoes.

==== By Gaslight ====
Stepping outside once again, the narrator notes the gas streetlights have been ignited; they give the city the appearance of a huge cathedral, flanked by candles illuminating rows upon rows of chapels among which roam saints and the faithful. The streets are populated by prostitutes who drag themselves on the sidewalks, the cold drafts making their ill-clad shoulders shiver; at the same time, sanctimonious bourgeois women traverse the streets avoiding the drainpipes with great difficulty; honest hard-working blacksmiths and bakers work through the night, while street urchins gape at the window displays.

The sight of some Mecklenburgers pawing the pavement while pulling a victoria makes the narrator satirise the frivolity of the bourgeois dress, with its corsets, printed shawls, coiled plaits, trains, and excessive adornment, all imported and sold by subservient store clerks buried under clouds of satin and choking in the rice powder hovering through the air.

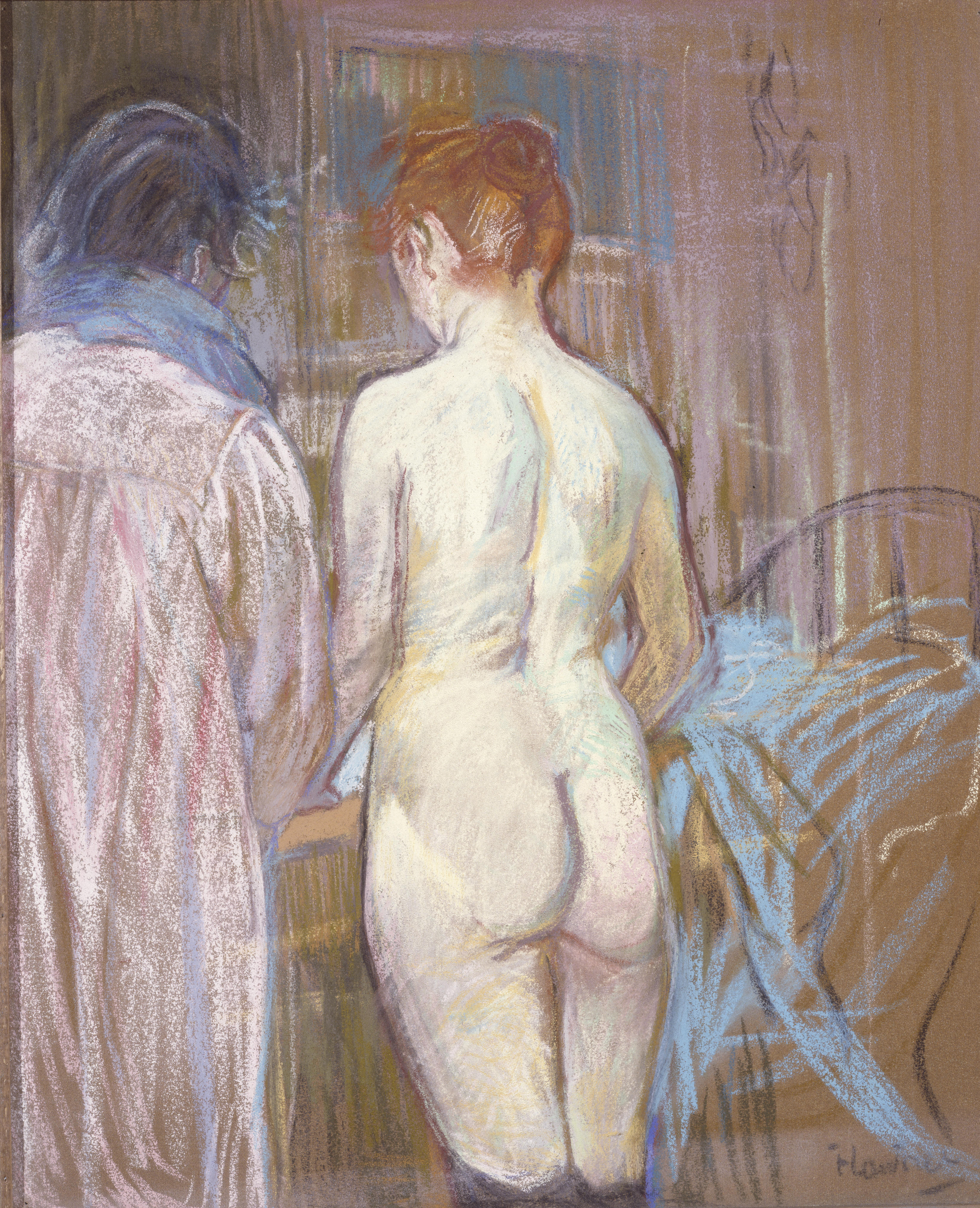
Prostitutes, Henri de Toulouse-Lautrec, c. 1893–5

Slowly, as it gets late, the storefronts' lights go dim and the buildings turn from glittering chapels to dark mausoleums. The streets go quiet, save for a lone, hoarse-voiced man hawking lottery tickets. In a corner, the narrator passes by a little man begging for alms: he recognises him as the old Latin teacher who had taught him at school.

==== The Dead Hours ====
In the silence of night all that can be heard is the clacking of shutters and the jangle of locks, as the narrator continues his stroll along a row of stately façades. He wishes for immortality ("Oh, if I'd never die! If forever / I'd seek and attain the perfection of things!", lines 145–146) as he imagines the youth that now sleeps will in dreams stumble upon the clarity needed to "explore every continent / And sail across the watery expanses!" (lines 155–156) like their forebears once did. This seems to mirror an episode in Canto X of Camões's The Lusiads, in which sea-goddess Tethys prophesies the coming of great Portuguese navigators in years to come.

His optimism is soon overcome by the flash of a knife in the shadows and the sound of a strangled cry for help. All he sees appalls him: a decadent society that lives walled in stone, murky streets, sorry drunkards staggering home, night watchmen making their rounds, sick prostitutes smoking in their balcony windows.

The closing verse speaks not of the narrator's anguish, but of human pain in itself: how it thrives in decadence and has its horizons set on the city's irregular mass of tomblike buildings, like a baleful sea.
