= Heteronym (literature) =

Imaginary character created by a writer to write in different styles

The literary concept of the heteronym refers to one or more imaginary character(s) created by a writer to write in different styles. Heteronyms differ from pen names (or pseudonyms, from the Greek words for "fake" and "name") in that the latter are just false names, while the former are characters that have their own supposed physiques, biographies, and writing styles.

Heteronyms were named and developed by the Portuguese writer and poet Fernando Pessoa in the early 20th century, but they were thoroughly explored by the Danish philosopher Kierkegaard in the 19th century and have also been used by other writers.

== Pessoa's heteronyms ==
In Pessoa's case, there are at least 70 heteronyms (according to the latest count by Pessoa's editor Teresa Rita Lopes). Some of them are relatives or know each other; they criticise and translate each other's works. Pessoa's three chief heteronyms are Alberto Caeiro, Ricardo Reis and Álvaro de Campos; the latter two consider the former their master. There are also two whom Pessoa called semi-heteronyms, Bernardo Soares and the Baron of Teive, who are semi-autobiographical characters who write in prose, "a mere mutilation" of the Pessoa personality. There is, lastly, an orthonym, Fernando Pessoa, the namesake of the author, who also considers Caeiro his master.

The heteronyms dialogue with each other and even with Pessoa in what he calls "the theatre of being" or "drama in people". They sometimes intervened in Pessoa's social life: during Pessoa's only attested romance, a jealous Campos wrote letters to the girl, who enjoyed the game and wrote back.

Pessoa, also an amateur astrologer, created in 1915 the heteronym Raphael Baldaya, a long bearded astrologer. He elaborated horoscopes of his main heteronyms in order to determine their personalities.

Fernando Pessoa on the heteronyms

How do I write in the name of these three? Caeiro, through sheer and unexpected inspiration, without knowing or even suspecting that I'm going to write in his name. Ricardo Reis, after an abstract meditation, which suddenly takes concrete shape in an ode. Campos, when I feel a sudden impulse to write and don't know what. (My semi-heteronym Bernardo Soares, who in many ways resembles Álvaro de Campos, always appears when I'm sleepy or drowsy, so that my qualities of inhibition and rational thought are suspended; his prose is an endless reverie. He's a semi-heteronym because his personality, although not my own, doesn't differ from my own but is a mere mutilation of it. He's me without my rationalism and emotions. His prose is the same as mine, except for certain formal restraint that reason imposes on my own writing, and his Portuguese is exactly the same – whereas Caeiro writes bad Portuguese, Campos writes it reasonably well but with mistakes such as "me myself" instead of "I myself", etc.., and Reis writes better than I, but with a purism I find excessive...)

Fernando Pessoa, Letter to Adolfo Casais Monteiro, 13.01.1935, in The Book of Disquiet, tr. Richard Zenith, Penguin Classics, 2002, p. 474.

George Steiner on the heteronyms

Pseudonymous writing is not rare in literature or philosophy (Kierkegaard provides a celebrated instance). 'Heteronyms', as Pessoa called and defined them, are something different and exceedingly strange. For each of his 'voices', Pessoa conceived a highly distinctive poetic idiom and technique, a complex biography, a context of literary influence and polemics and, most arrestingly of all, subtle interrelations and reciprocities of awareness. Octavio Paz defines Caeiro as 'everything that Pessoa is not and more'. He is a man magnificently at home in nature, a virtuoso of pre-Christian innocence, almost a Portuguese teacher of Zen. Reis is a stoic Horatian, a pagan believer in fate, a player with classical myths less original than Caeiro, but more representative of modern symbolism. De Campos emerges as a Whitmanesque futurist, a dreamer in drunkenness, the Dionysian singer of what is oceanic and windswept in Lisbon. None of this triad resembles the metaphysical solitude, the sense of being an occultist medium which characterise Pessoa's 'own' intimate verse.

George Steiner, "A man of many parts", in The Observer, Sunday, 3 June 2001.

Richard Zenith on the heteronyms

Álvaro de Campos, the poet-persona who grew old with Pessoa and held a privileged place in his inventor's hearts. Soares, the assistant bookkeeper and Campos, the naval engineer never met in the pen-and-paper drama of Pessoa's heteronyms, who were frequently pitted against one other, but the two writer-characters were spiritual brothers, even if their worldly occupations were at odds. Campos wrote prose, as well as poetry, and much of it reads at it came, so to speak, from the hand of Soares. Pessoa was often unsure who was writing when he wrote, and it's curious that the very first item among the more than 25,000 pieces that make up his archives in the National Library of Lisbon bears the heading A. de C. (?) or B. de D. (or something else).

Richard Zenith, introduction to The Book of Disquiet, Penguin Classics, 2002, p. XI.

=== Álvaro de Campos ===
Fernando Pessoa

Alberto Caeiro

Álvaro de Campos

Ricardo Reis

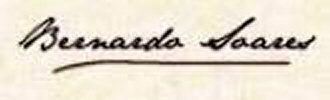
Bernardo Soares

This heteronym was created by Fernando Pessoa as an alter ego who inherited his role from Alexander Search and this one from Charles Robert Anon. The latter was created when Pessoa lived in Durban, while Search was created in 1906, when Pessoa was a student at Lisbon's University, in search of his Portuguese cultural identity, after his return from Durban.

Anon was supposedly English, while Search, although English, was born in Lisbon. After the Portuguese republican revolution, in 1910, and consequent patriotic atmosphere, Pessoa dropped his English heteronyms and Álvaro de Campos was created as a Portuguese alter ego. Álvaro de Campos, born in 1890, was supposedly a Portuguese naval engineer graduated in Glasgow.

Campos sailed to the Orient, living experiences that he describes in his poem "Opiarium". He worked in London (1915), Barrow on Furness and Newcastle (1922), but became unemployed, and returned to Lisbon in 1926, the year of the military putsch that installed dictatorship. He also wrote "Lisbon Revisited (1923)" and "Lisbon Revisited (1926)".

Campos was a decadent poet, but he embraced Futurism; his poetry was strongly influenced by Walt Whitman and Marinetti. He wrote the "Ode Triumphal" and "Ode Maritime", published in the literary journal Orpheu, in 1915, and other unfinished.

While unemployed in Lisbon, he became depressed, returning to Decadentism and Pessimism. Then he wrote his master work, "Tobacco Shop", published in 1933, in the literary journal Presença.

=== Alberto Caeiro ===
Pessoa created this heteronym as "Master" of the other heteronyms and even Pessoa himself. This fictional character was born in 1889 and died in 1915, at 26, almost the same age as Pessoa's best friend Mário de Sá-Carneiro, who killed himself in Paris in 1916 less than a month shy of his 26th birthday. Thus, Sá-Carneiro seems to have inspired, at least partially, Alberto Caeiro.

Caeiro was a humble man of poor education, but a great poet "naif", he was born in Lisbon, but lives almost his life in the countryside, Ribatejo, near Lisbon, where he died. However, his poetry is full of philosophy. He wrote "Poemas Inconjuntos" (Disconnected Poems) and "O Guardador de Rebanhos" (The Keeper of Sheep), published by Fernando Pessoa in his "Art Journal" Athena in 1924–25.

In a famous letter to the literary critic Adolfo Casais Monteiro, dated January 13, 1935, Pessoa describes his "triumphal day", March 8, 1914, when Caeiro "appeared", making him write down all the poetry of "The Keeper of Sheep" at once. Caeiro influenced the Neopaganism of Pessoa, and of the heteronyms António Mora and Ricardo Reis. Poetically, he influenced mainly the Neoclassicism of Reis, which is connected to Paganism.

=== Ricardo Reis ===
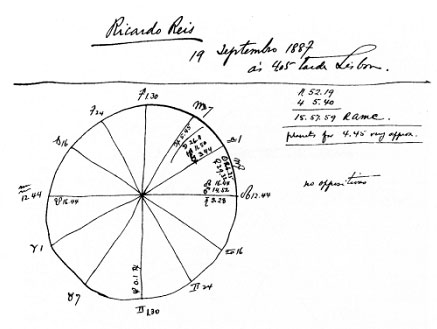
Astrological chart of the heteronym Ricardo Reis by Fernando Pessoa

This heteronym was created by Pessoa as a Portuguese doctor born in Porto, on September 19, 1887. Reis supposedly studied at a boarding school run by Jesuits in which he received a classical education. He was an amateur latinist and poet; politically a monarchist, he went into exile to Brazil after the defeat of a monarchical rebellion against the Portuguese Republic in 1919. Ricardo Reis reveals his Epicureanism and Stoicism in the "Odes by Ricardo Reis", published by Pessoa in 1924, in his literary journal Athena.

Since Pessoa didn't determine the death of Reis, one can assume that he survived his author who died in 1935. In The Year of the Death of Ricardo Reis (1984), Portuguese Nobel Prize winner José Saramago rebuilds, in his own personal outlook, the literary world of this heteronym after 1935, creating a dialog between Ricardo Reis and the ghost of his author.

=== List of Pessoa's heteronyms ===
No.	Name	Type	*Notes
1	Fernando António Nogueira Pessoa	himself	Commercial correspondent in Lisbon
2	Fernando Pessoa	orthonym	Poet and prose writer
3	Fernando Pessoa	autonym	Poet and prose writer
4	Fernando Pessoa	heteronym	Poet, a pupil of Alberto Caeiro
5	Alberto Caeiro	heteronym	Poet, author of 'O guardador de Rebanhos','O Pastor Amoroso' and 'Poemas inconjuntos', master of Fernando Pessoa heteronyms, Álvaro de Campos, Ricardo Reis, António Mora and Coelho Pacheco
6	Ricardo Reis	heteronym	Poet and prose writer, author of 'Odes' and texts on the work of Alberto Caeiro. Biographical note: (Porto, 1887–1936). He graduated in medicine and is an unconditional admirer of the Greek civilisation above all others, and considers himself to be an expatriate from Greece. Being a royalist he chooses to emigrate to Brazil in 1919 (Portuguese monarchy had been overthrown in 1910). In his neoclassical odes he ponders on the briefness of life, the inevitability of death and the helplessness of the human condition. This “sad epicure” tries to find some contentment through the acceptance of fate and self-discipline lives by Horatio's a motto: carpe diem (seize the day).
7	Frederico Reis	heteronym/para-heteronym	Essayist, brother of Ricardo Reis, upon whom he writes
8	Álvaro de Campos	heteronym	Poet and prose writer, a pupil of Alberto Caeiro. Biographical note: Álvaro de Campos. (Tavira, Algarve, 1890–?). He studies naval engineering in Scotland. He feels a foreigner wherever he is. Suffocated by a tedious and monotonous existence, failing to see the meaning of life, he looks for new sensations and travels to the Far East. When he comes back he is a renewed man. He embraces the futuristic movement and worships industrialisation and scientific and technological progress, with its hectic relentless rhythm and continuous change. There is an ecstasy of the senses, his relationship with machines and charcoal and steel is almost erotic. But in the background of this modern world lurk the shadows of the assembly line, the pollution, the emptiness of material things. The darkness of what is to come —eventually Campos tires. In his third phase, profoundly disenchanted with the present, he evokes the long-gone days of his perfectly happy childhood.
9	António Mora	heteronym	Philosopher and sociologist, theorist of Neopaganism, a pupil of Alberto Caeiro
10	Claude Pasteur	heteronym/semi-heteronym	French, translator of "CADERNOS DE RECONSTRUÇÃO PAGÃ" conducted by Antonio Mora
11	Bernardo Soares	heteronym/semi-heteronym	Poet and prose writer, author of the 'Book of Disquiet'
12	Vicente Guedes	heteronym/semi-heteronym	Poet shorty writer, translator, author of 'The Book of Disquiet' until 1920
13	Gervásio Guedes	heteronym/para-heteronym	Author of the text 'A Coroação de Jorge Quinto'
14	Alexander Search	heteronym	Poet and short story writer
15	Charles James Search	heteronym/para-heteronym	Translator and essayist, brother of Alexander Search
16	Jean-Méluret of Seoul	heteronym/proto-heteronym	French Poet and Essayist
17	Rafael Baldaya	heteronym	Astrologer and author of 'Tratado da Negação' and 'Princípios de Metaphysica Esotérica'
18	Barão de Teivo	heteronym	Prose writer, author of "Educação do Stoica" and "Daphnis e Chloe"
19	Charles Robert Anon	heteronym/semi-heteronym	Poet, philosopher and story writer
20	A. A. Crosse	pseudonym/proto-heteronym	Author and Puzzle-solver
21	Thomas Crosse	heteronym/proto-heteronym	English epic character/occultist, popularised in Portuguese culture
22	I. I. Crosse	heteronym/para-heteronym	----
23	David Merrick	heteronym/semi-heteronym	Poet, storyteller and Playwright
24	Lucas Merrick	heteronym/para-heteronym	Short story writer, perhaps brother David Merrick
25	Pêro Botelho	heteronym/pseudonym	Short story writer and author of Letters
26	Abílio Quaresma	heteronym/character/meta-heteronym	A character inspired by Botelho Pêro and author of short detective stories
27	Inspector Guedes	character/meta-heteronym?	A character inspired by Botelho Pêro and author of short detective stories
28	Uncle Pork	pseudonym/character	A character inspired by Botelho Pêro and author of short detective stories
29	Frederick Wyatt	alias/heteronym	Poet and prose writer (in the English language)
30	Rev. Walter Wyatt	character	Possibly brother of Frederick Wyatt
31	Alfred Wyatt	character	Another brother of Frederick Wyatt/a resident of Paris
32	Maria José	heteronym/proto-heteronym	Wrote and signed "A Carta da Corcunda para o Serralheiro"
33	Chevalier de Pas	pseudonym/proto-heteronym	Author of poems and letters
34	Efbeedee Pasha	heteronym/proto-heteronym	Author of humoristic "Stories"
35	Faustino Antunes/A. Moreira	heteronym/pseudonym	Psychologist, author of "Ensaio sobre a Intuição"
36	Carlos Otto	heteronym/proto-heteronym	Poet and author of "Tratado de Lucta Livre"
37	Michael Otto	pseudonym/para-heteronym	Probably brother of Carlos Otto who was entrusted with the translation into English of "Tratado de Lucta Livre"
38	Dr. Gaudencio Nabos	heteronym	Author of humorous poems, sketches. Practiced medicine in Durban, London
39	Horace James Faber	heteronym/semi-heteronym	short story writer and essayist (in English)
40	Navas	heteronym/para-heteronym	Translated Horace James Faber in Portuguese
41	Pantaleão	heteronym/proto-heteronym	Poet and prose
42	Torquato Fonseca Mendes da Cunha Rey	heteronym/meta-heteronym	Deceased author of a text, Pantaleão decided to publish
43	Joaquim Moura Costa	proto-heteronym/semi-heteronym	satirical poet, Republican activist, member of "O PHOSPHORO"
44	Sher Henay	proto-heteronym/pseudonym	Compiler and author of the preface of a sensationalist anthology in English
45	Anthony Gomes	semi-heteronym/character	Philosopher, author of "Historia Cómica do Affonso Çapateiro"
46	Professor Trochee	proto-heteronym/pseudonym	Author of an essay with humorous advice for young poets
47	Willyam Links Esk	character	Signed a letter written in English on 13/4/1905
48	António de Seabra	pseudonym/proto-heteronym	Literary critic
49	João Craveiro	pseudonym/proto-heteronym	Journalist, follower of Sidónio Pereira
50	Tagus	pseudonym	Collaborator in "NATAL MERCURY" (Durban, South Africa), inventor and solver of riddles
51	Pipa Gomes	draft heteronym	Collaborator in "O PHOSPHORO"
52	Ibis	character/a pseudonym	A character from Pessoa's childhood, accompanying him until the end of his life/also signed poems
53	Dr. Gaudencio Turnips	proto-heteronym/pseudonym	Director of "O PALRADOR", English-Portuguese journalist and humorist
54	Pip	proto-heteronym/pseudonym	Poet, humorous anecdotes. Predecessor of Dr. Pancrazio
55	Dr. Pancrazio	proto-heteronym/pseudonym	Storyteller, poet and creator of charades
56	Luís António Congo	proto-heteronym/pseudonym	Collaborator in "O PALRADOR", columnist and presenter of Lanca Eduardo
57	Eduardo Lance	proto-heteronym/pseudonym	Luso-Brazilian poet
58	A. Francisco de Paula Angard	proto-heteronym/pseudonym	Collaborator in "O PALRADOR", author of "textos scientificos"
59	Pedro da Silva Salles/Zé Pad	proto-heteronym/alias	Author and director of the section of anecdotes at "O PALRADOR"
60	José Rodrigues do Valle/Scicio	proto-heteronym/alias	"O PALRADOR", author of charades and 'literary manager'
61	Dr. Caloiro	proto-heteronym/pseudonym	"O PALRADOR", reporter and author of "A pesca das pérolas"
62	Adolph Moscow	proto-heteronym/pseudonym	"O PALRADOR", novelist, author of "Os Rapazes de Barrowby"
63	Marvell Kisch	proto-heteronym/pseudonym	Author of a novel announced in "O PALRADOR", called "A Riqueza de um Doido"
64	Gabriel Keene	proto-heteronym/pseudonym	Author of a novel announced in "O PALRADOR", called "Em Dias de Perigo"
65	Sableton-Kay	proto-heteronym/pseudonym	Author of a novel announced in "O PALRADOR", called "A Lucta Aérea"
66	Morris & Theodor	pseudonym	"O PALRADOR", author of charades
67	Diabo Azul	pseudonym	"O PALRADOR", author of charades
68	Parry	pseudonym	"O PALRADOR", author of charades
69	Gallião Pequeno	pseudonym	"O PALRADOR", author of charades
70	Urban Accursio	alias	"O PALRADOR", author of charades
71	Cecília	pseudonym	"O PALRADOR", author of charades
72	José rasteiro	proto-heteronym/pseudonym	"O PALRADOR", author of proverbs and riddles
73	Nympha Negra	pseudonym	"O PALRADOR", author of charades
74	Diniz da Silva	pseudonym/proto-heteronym	Author of the poem "Loucura" and collaborator in "EUROPE"
75	Herr Prosit	pseudonym	Translator of 'O Estudante de Salamanca' by Espronceda
76	Henry More	proto-heteronym	Author and prose writer
77	Wardour	character?	Astral communicator, poetry coach
78	J. M. Hyslop	character?	Poet

== Other writers and their heteronyms ==
- Søren Kierkegaard - Had more than a dozen heteronyms with distinct biographies and personalities.
- David Solway, Canadian writer, writing as Andreas Karavis.
- Kent Johnson, American scholar and poet writing as Araki Yasusada.
- Peter Russell, English poet, translated The Elegies of Quintilius, a Latin poet.
- Robin Skelton, Canadian poet and occultist, writing as French surrealist Georges Zuk.
- Geoffrey Hill. English poet, translated The Songbook Of Sebastian Arrurruz
- B.H. Fairchild, American poet, writing as Roy Eldridge Garcia.
- Daniel Handler, American writer, writing as Lemony Snicket.
- Romain Gary, French writer, writing as Émile Ajar, Fosco Sinibaldi, Shatan Bogat.
- Antoine Volodine, French writer, writing as Elli Kronauer, Manuela Draeger, Lutz Bassman.
- Brian O'Nolan writing as Flann O'Brien and Myles na gCopaleen.
- Arnon Grunberg writing as Marek van der Jagt.
- Raymond A. Palmer (1910-1977), American editor and writer; published stories under his own name and multiple pseudonyms, several of which were attributed different personalities and biographies (e.g., "A.E. Steber" was a Russian military officer who engaged in espionage against Nazi Germany before relocating to the US).
- Laura Albert (born 1955) wrote under the name JT LeRoy, an adolescent male persona she described as an "avatar" that allowed her to write things that she was unable to write as herself.
- Jane Holland, poet and novelist, also writes as Victoria Lamb, Elizabeth Moss, Beth Good and Hannah Coates.
- Frank X. Gaspar, Portuguese American poet and novelist, writes as Renata Ferreira, a woman who worked for the resistance in the final years of Portugal's fascist regime in his book The Poems of Renata Ferreira published in 2020.
- Peter Boyle, an Australian poet and translator.
- Another example is that of an Uruguayan poet living in Sweden, Hebert Abimorad, with his heteronyms Flor Condominio, Martina Martínez, José José, Camilo Alegre, Silvestre del Bosque and others.

== Heteronyms in music ==
- Robert Schumann - In his music and music criticism he distinguished between "Florestan" for his impetuous self and "Eusebius" for his gentle poetic side.
- David Bowie - Systematically employed heteronyms as a performer, his personae changing given the content of the album on which they appear, including but not limited to Ziggy Stardust, Aladdin Sane, and The Thin White Duke.
- Nicki Minaj - American singer and rapper also raps as Roman Zolanski and Harajuku Barbie.
- MF Doom - Had several heteronyms such as Madvillain and Viktor Vaughn.
- Eminem - Also raps as Marshall Mathers, Slim Shady, and Stan.
- Lawrence Rothman - Has nine heteronyms such as Elizabeth and Alesiter.

== See also ==
- Sock puppet (Internet)

== Notes ==
1. ZENITH, Richard (2002), The Book of Disquiet, Penguin Classics, 2002.
2. Pessoa, by Richard Zenith
3. Pessoa by Richard Zenith
4. Pessoa by Richard Zenith
5. Pessoa, by Richard Zenith
6. Fred Nadis (2013) The Man From Mars: Ray Palmer's Amazing Pulp Journey, NY: Jeremy P. Tarcher/Penguin, p. 74
7. Albert, Laura. "Laura Albert at The Moth "My Avatar & Me" " YouTube. Archived from the original on 2021-12-21. Retrieved 2013-01-30.
8. "Jane Holland" The Crime Readers' Association.
9. "A Guide to the Many Personalities of Nicky Minaj" www.papermag.com. Retrieved 2015-08-27.

Authority control: National libraries	Germany; Israel; United States
