= Guilherme de Santa-Rita =

Portuguese painter

Santa-Rita Pintor
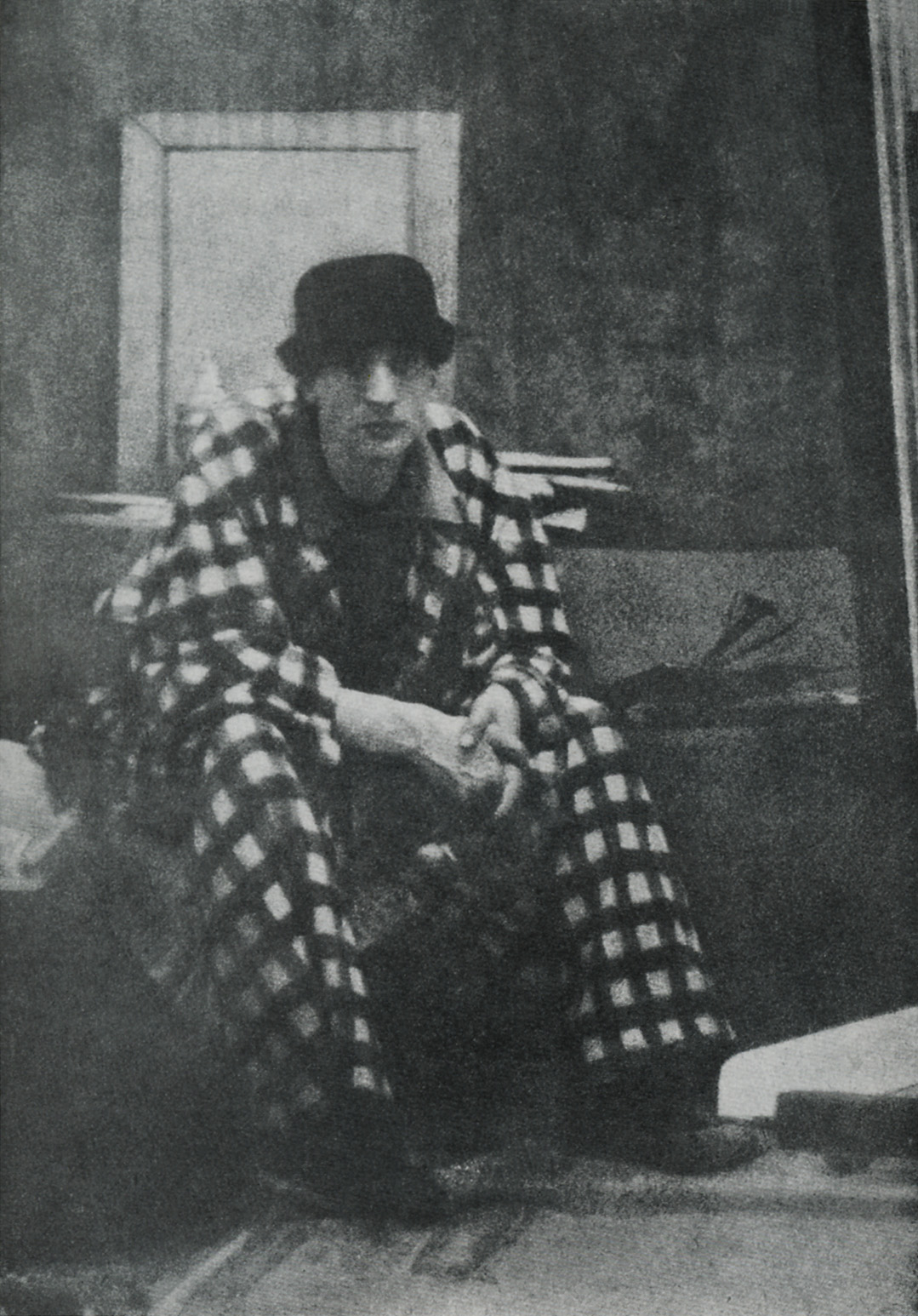
- Guilherme de Santa Rita, from Portugal Futurista (1917)
- Born: Guilherme Augusto Cau da Costa de Santa-Rita; 31 October 1889; Lisbon, Portugal
- Died: 29 April 1918 (aged 28); Lisbon, Portugal
- Movement: Futurism

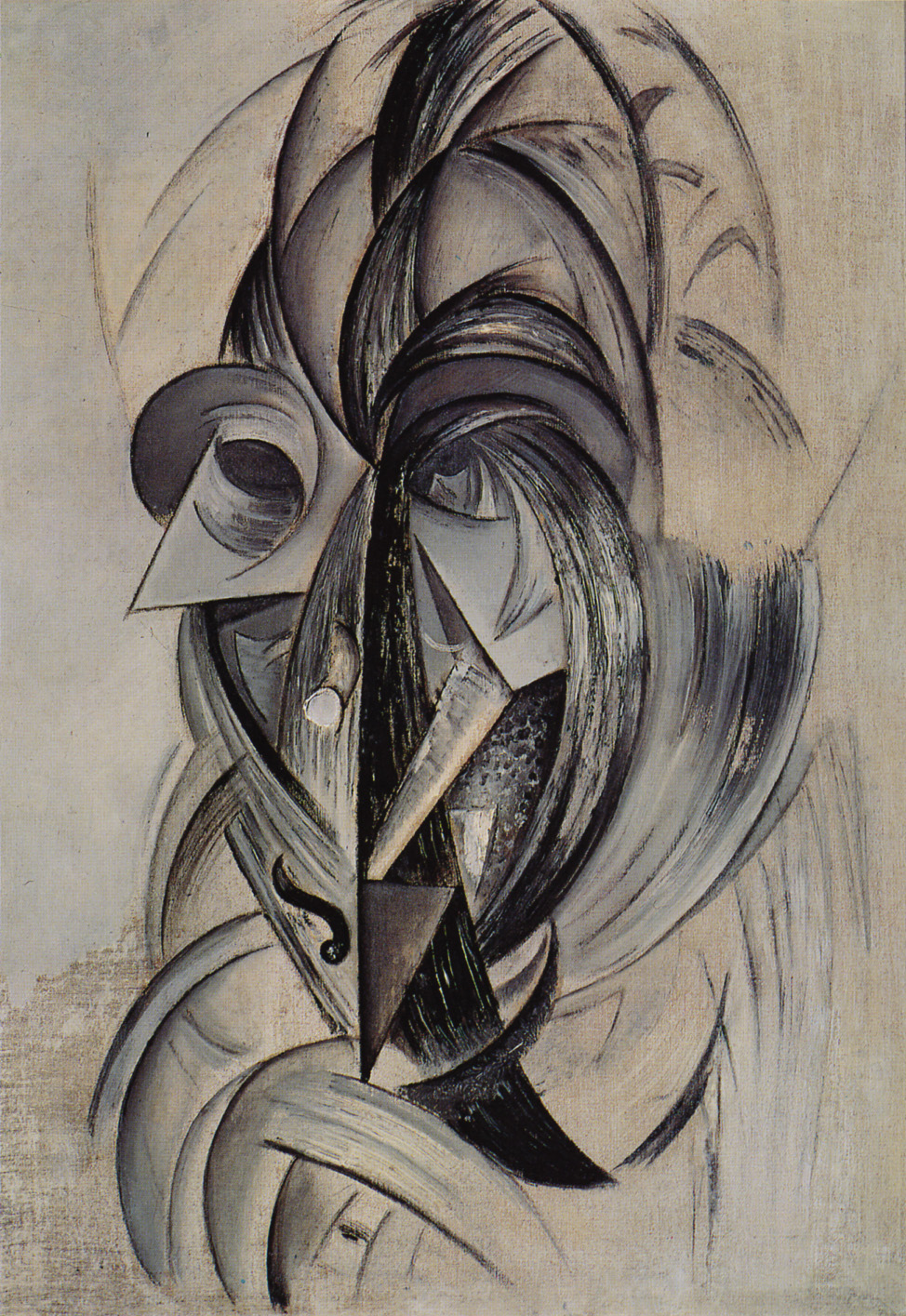
Head (c.1910)

Santa-Rita Pintor, born Guilherme Augusto Cau da Costa de Santa-Rita (1889 – 1918), was a Portuguese Futurist painter, known for his eccentricities, which included his signature mode of dressing: work clothes with striped rectangles.

== Life ==
He first attended the Academy of Fine Arts (now part of the University of Lisbon), then went to Paris on a state scholarship in 1910. There, he studied at the École des Beaux-Arts. He also shared a studio with Amadeo de Souza-Cardoso and was introduced to Futurism by Filippo Tommaso Marinetti. An avowed Monarchist, after the 1910 Revolution he came into conflict with João Chagas, the Portuguese Ambassador, who was an even stronger advocate of Republicanism. This resulted in the loss of his scholarship.

After his return home, he saw himself as the official representative of Futurism in Portugal and made a failed attempt to publish Marinetti's works there. In 1913, he appeared as a character in the novel A Confissão de Lúcio (Lúcio's Confession) by Mário de Sá-Carneiro. Four years later, he and José de Almada Negreiros were the main participants at a conference in the Teatro República, where Futurist documents were read and a manifesto announced. That same year, he helped launch the journal Portugal Futurista. Only one issue was published, and most of the copies were seized by the police due to alleged obscenity.

He died of tuberculosis at his parents' home in 1918, leaving instructions to destroy all of his works. A few paintings survived in the hands of collectors and friends. They are now in the possession of the Ministry of Culture and the Chiado Museum. Others were partially preserved as black and white illustrations in Portugal Futurista and a similar journal called Orpheu.
