= Geração de Orpheu =

The literary journal ORPHEU
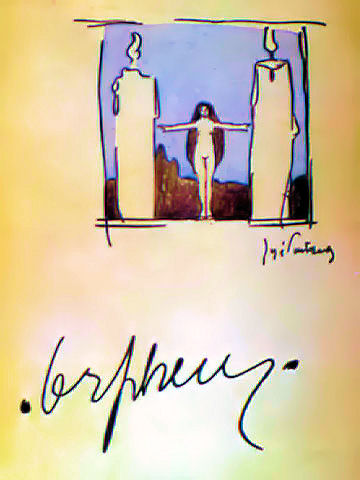
- Issue nr. 1, Jan-Feb-Mar 1915. Cover design by José Pacheco

The Geração de Orpheu (Orpheus's Generation) or Grupo de Orfeu were a Portuguese literary movement, largely responsible for the introduction of Modernism to the arts and letters of Portugal through their tri-monthly publication, Orpheu (magazine) (1915).

Following the lead of other European vanguard movements of the early twentieth century, and inspired by the Futurist Vladimir Maiakovsky's urgings, the poets Fernando Pessoa, Mário de Sá-Carneiro and Almada Negreiros, and the painters Amadeo de Souza-Cardoso and Guilherme de Santa-Rita formed a journal of art and literature based in Lisbon's Baixa district, with the principal aim of agitating, subverting and scandalizing the Portuguese bourgeoisie and social conventions.

== Orpheu ==
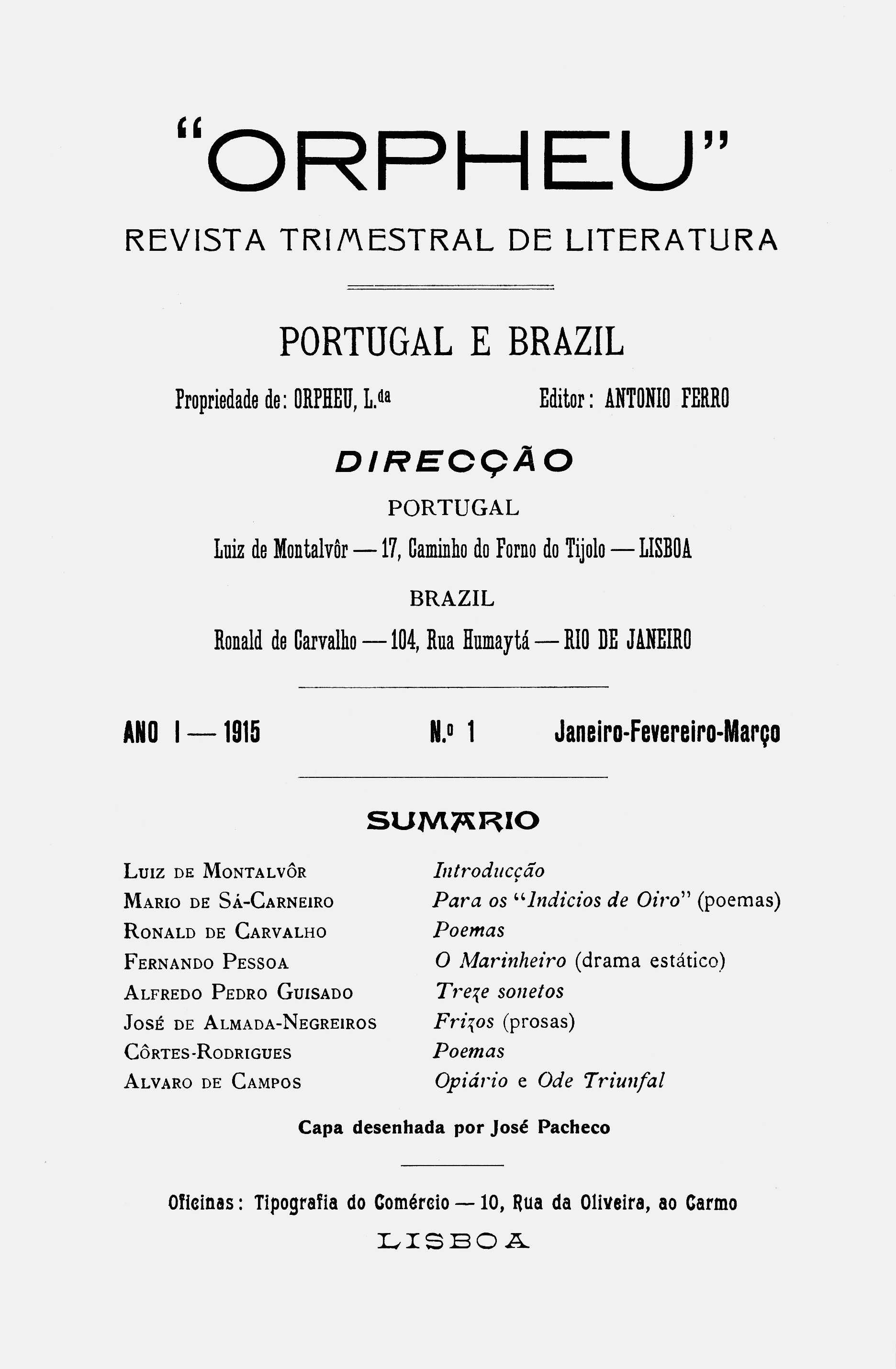
Title page of ORPHEU nr. 1.

The journal was named Orpheu after the Greek mythological character Orpheus, the musician who had to travel from the world of the living without looking back to save his wife Eurydice from Hades. This metaphor inspired the Geração de Orpheu, who aspired to not look back, to relinquish the past and focus on the future for the "edification of Portugal in the twentieth century". After emerging onto the Portuguese literary scene in 1915, the journal folded due to financial insolvency, when the father of Mário de Sá-Carneiro refused to continue sponsoring it. Only two issues were published (Jan-Feb-Mar and Apr-May-Jun, 1915). The third issue of Orpheu, already in printing proof, was lost for many years and until it was recovered and published in 1984.

== After Orpheu ==
After the dissolution of Orpheu, the group continued to publish in other literary journals. In 1917, Portugal Futurista came out with reproductions of Santa-Rita Pintor and Souza-Cardoso, along with the posthumous Futurist poems of Sá-Carneiro and some poetry by Fernando Pessoa and his heteronym Álvaro de Campos. Among the journals that published contributions from the Grupo were: Exílio (1916), Centauro (1916), Portugal Futurista (1917), Athena (1924–1925) and Presença (1927–1940).

== Members of the movement ==
- Alfredo Guisado, writer
- Almada Negreiros, writer / visual artist / choreographer
- Ângelo de Lima, writer
- António Ferro, writer
- Armando Côrtes-Rodrigues, writer
- Eduardo Guimaraens, writer
- Fernando Pessoa, writer
- José Pacheko, painter and architect
- Luís de Montalvôr, writer
- Mário de Sá-Carneiro, writer
- Santa-Rita Pintor, painter

== Bibliography ==
- AA.VV. (1989). ORPHEU, edição facsimilada. Lisboa: Contexto Editora. ISBN 972-575-076-4
- SARAIVA, António José and Óscar Lopes (1993). História da Literatura Portuguesa. Porto: Porto Editora, 17th ed. ISBN 972-0-30170-8
- MARTINS, Fernando Cabral (coord.) (2008). Dicionário de Fernando Pessoa e do Modernismo Português. Alfragide: Editorial Caminho. ISBN 978-972-21-1985-6
