= David Solway =

Canadian poet, educational theorist, travel writer and literary critic

David Solway (born 8 December 1941) is a Canadian poet, essayist, educational theorist, travel writer, and literary critic.

== Biography ==
Solway received a BA in English and Philosophy from McGill University in 1962, and a QMA in Philosophy in 1966. He has later received a MA in creative writing/English from Concordia University in 1988, a MA in education from Université de Sherbrooke in 1996, and a Ph.D summa cum laude from Lajos Kossuth University in Debrecen in 1998. He was formerly a teacher at Dawson College and John Abbott College in Montreal, and at Brigham Young University in Provo, Utah, and has been a guest lecturer at several international universities. He has "won numerous awards and prizes for his work in both poetry and non-fiction," including QSPELL Awards, Grand Prix du Livre de Montréal and A. M. Klein Prize for Poetry.

Solway is known for his work both as a poet, essayist and as a teacher, as well as for his polemical outspokenness, especially in opposition to Islam and in defense of Zionism. He has contributed political commentary to the conservative websites WorldNetDaily and PJ Media, and has been described as a part of the counter-jihad movement.

For inspiration, he invented a Greek poet named Andreas Karavis as a heteronym, whose work he published in apparent translation.

== Bibliography ==
=== Poetry ===
- The Road to Arginos (1976)
- Twelve Sonnets (1978)
- Mephistopheles and the Astronaut (1979)
- Stones in Water (1983)
- Modern Marriage (1987)
- Bedrock (1993)
- Chess Pieces (1999)
- Saracen Island: The Poetry of Andreas Karavis (as Andreas Karavis; 2000)
- The Lover's Progress: Poems after William Hogarth (2001)
- Franklin's Passage (2003)
- The Pallikari Of Nesmine Rifat (as Nesmine Rifat; 2005)
- Reaching for Clear: The Poetry of Rhys Savarin (2007)
- Windsurfing (2008)

=== Essays and criticism ===
- Education Lost (1989)
- Random Walks
- Lying about the Wolf: Essays in Culture & Education (1997)
- The Turtle Hypodermic of Sickenpods: Liberal Studies in the Corporate Age (2000)
- An Andreas Karavis Companion (2000)
- Director's Cut (2003)
- The Big Lie: On Terror, Antisemitism, and Identity (2007)
- Hear, O Israel! (2009)
- Notes from a Derelict Culture (2019)
- Crossing the Jordan: On Judaism, Islam, and the West (2024)

== Sources ==
- New, W. H., ed. The Encyclopedia of Literature in Canada. Toronto: University of Toronto Press, 2002. p. 1058.
- Carmine Starnino, ed. David Solway, Essays on His Works (2001)
