= Andreas Karavis =

Fictional Greek poet

Andreas Karavis is a non-existent Greek poet created by Canadian poet David Solway.

In October 1999, Books in Canada published an article titled "Modern Homer" about a supposedly newly discovered Greek poet Andreas Karavis, with an interview, a photograph, and an essay by David Solway. In the piece, Solway claimed that he had hunted the reclusive fisherman-poet for years until he had finally met him in 1991, and that he had begun to translate his poems in 1993.

Solway claimed that Karavis had been born in 1932 in Chania, Crete, and that he lived on the Dodecanese island of Lipsi. After Karavis's education on Serifos, disrupted by World War II and the civil war, he became a fisherman and settled on Amorgos, selling his books of poetry in local harbors. Amongst his supposed collections was White Poems (1965). After having laboured in obscurity for the greater part of his life, he had become one of the country's most acclaimed and admired writers with the 1989 publication of The Dream Masters.

In reality, Karavis was the creation of Solway. However, other people joined the joke. In the next issue there was a letter from a self-declared expert on Greek poetry, "Fred Reed". He did not dispute Karavis' existence, but claimed that Karavis was in fact a smuggler, not a fisherman, and that the first poems were nothing else than pirated translations from a group of expatriate Canadians.

Later, press attaché Yiorgos Chouliaris of the Greek embassy wrote to Solway to congratulate him for "imaginative effort". Solway convinced him to join the hoax.

The fame of Karavis spread. There were reports of international conferences about his poetry in Thessaloniki and Coimbra. Solway met a writer who claimed that he had admired Karavis for many years, and someone who said that Karavis was more worthy of the Nobel Prize than more famous Greek poets. He even received two postcards signed with Karavis's name.

In 2000, Chouliaris was one of the hosts at the launch of a translation of Karavis's poems, Saracen Island: The Poetry of Andreas Karavis. Although Solway claimed to be the translator, the work was entirely his creation. A man who claimed to be Karavis appeared, wearing a fisherman's cap and speaking something that at least sounded like Greek.

Soon afterward Matthew Hayes, a columnist of The Globe and Mail in Toronto, wrote an article entitled Karavis: Greek god of poetry or literary hoax?. In a 2001 issue of Lingua Franca magazine, Solway finally confessed in public that he had invented the poet, and that the man who had appeared at the book launch, purporting to be Karavis, was actually Solway's dentist.

Solway has said that he had created Karavis as an "alter ego and heteronym" to gain new inspiration for his poetry.

== Bibliography ==
- Saracen Island: The Poetry of Andreas Karavis (2000)
- An Andreas Karavis Companion (2000)
