= António Gomes Leal =

Portuguese poet (1848-1921)

António Duarte Gomes Leal
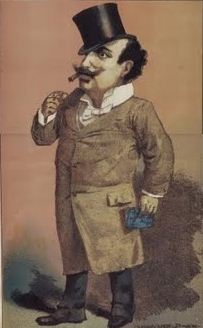
- Born: 6 June 1848; Lisbon, Portugal
- Died: 29 January 1921 (aged 72)
- Writing career
- Genres: Romance, religion
- Subjects: Women, death, travel, misery

António Gomes Leal was a Portuguese poet.

== Life and work ==
Leal was born in Rossio, part of Lisbon. He was the son of João António Gomes Leal (d. 1876), a customs officer, and Henrietta Fernandina Monteiro Alves Cabral Leal.

Leal studied literature, but did not complete his studies and became a notary clerk of Lisbon. During his youth he took the pose of a poet interested in Bohemianism and Satanism, but with the death of his mother in 1910, he fell into poverty and converted to Catholicism.

In 1933 the Lisbon City Council honored the poet by naming a street after him in the Bairro do Arco do Cego, Areeiro parish.
