= Álvaro de Campos =

Heteronym of Fernando Pessoa

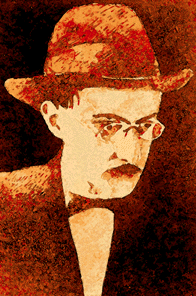
- Portrait by João Luiz Roth
- Born: October 15, 1890; Tavira, Portugal
- Died: November 30, 1935 (aged 45); Lisbon, Portugal
- Occupations: Poet, ship engineer
- Writing career
- Language: Portuguese, English

Álvaro de Campos (European Portuguese pronunciation: [ˈalvɐɾu ðɨ ˈkɐ̃puʃ]; October 15, 1890 – November 30, 1935) was one of the poet Fernando Pessoa's various heteronyms, with a reputation for a powerful and angry style of writing. This alter ego is recounted to have been born in Tavira, Portugal.

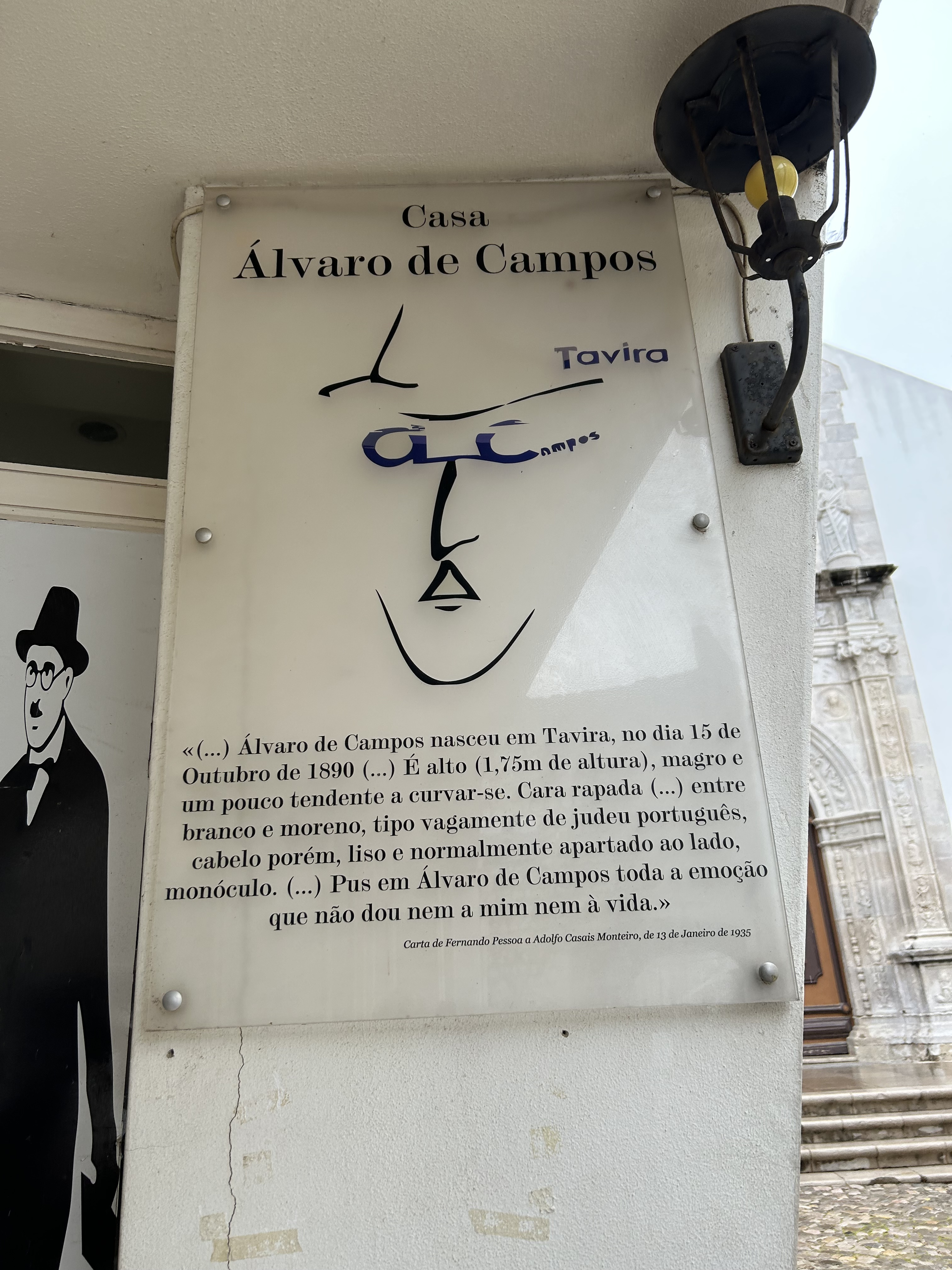
Entrance to Casa Álvaro de Campos, Tavira

He studied mechanical engineering, to finally graduate in ship engineering at Glasgow. After some time in Ireland, Campos sailed to the Far East, and wrote his poem "Opiário" on board ship in the Suez Canal. He eventually returned to work in 'Barrow-on-Furness' (sic) (about which Pessoa wrote a poem) and Newcastle-on-Tyne (1922). Unemployed, Campos returned to Lisbon in 1926 (where he wrote the poem "Lisbon Revisited"), and settled there for the rest of his (fictitious) life. He was described as having been born in October, 1890. However, Pessoa never indicated how Campos met his end, leaving it in the air whether he would have survived beyond November 1935, when Pessoa died.

Works written as from Campos' pen suggest three phases: the decadent, the futuristic and a final sad chapter. He chose Whitman and Marinetti as masters, showing some similarities with their works, mainly in the second phase: hymns like "Ode Triunfal", "Ode Marítima", and "Ultimatum" praise the power of rising technology, the strength of machines, the dark side of industrial civilization, and an enigmatic love for machines. The first phase (marked by the poem Opiário) derived some of its pessimism from Pessoa's friend Mário de Sá-Carneiro, with whom he had collaborated on the Orpheu magazine. In the last phase, Pessoa drops the mask, and affords a glimpse, through Campos, of the emptiness and nostalgia that took over during his own last years. It was during this last phase that the fictional Campos wrote the poems "Lisbon Revisited" and the well-known "Tobacco Shop".

"I always want to be the thing I feel kinship with...
To feel everything in every way,
To hold all opinions,
To be sincere contradicting oneself every minute..."

== Critical overview ==
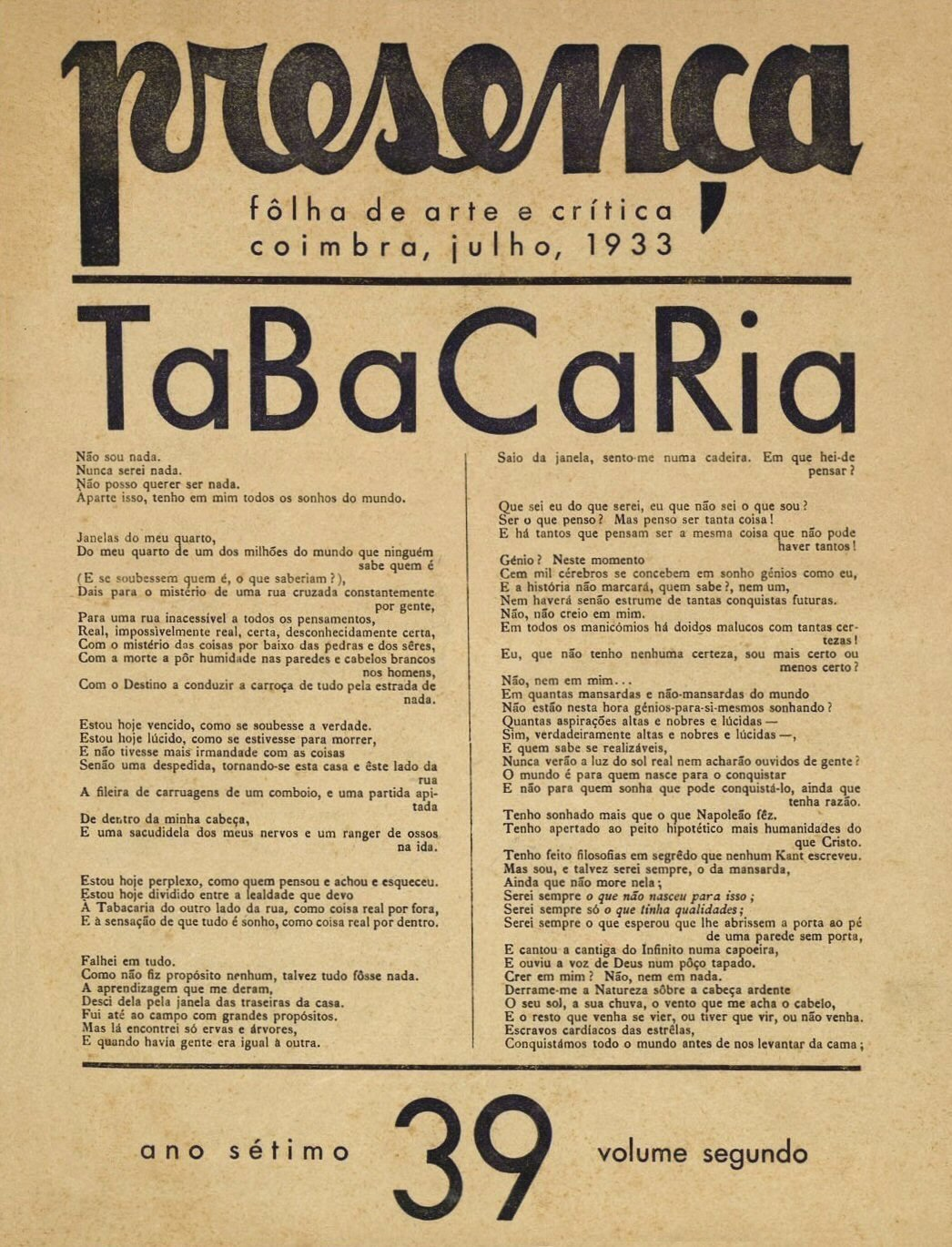
"The Tobacco Shop" (Tabacaria), poem by Álvaro de Campos first published in the literary journal from Coimbra, Presença, in July 1933.

"I'm nothing.
I'll always be nothing.
I can't want to be something.
I have in me all the dreams of the world nevertheless."

"The Tobacco Shop"

Campos manifests two contrary impulses: on the one hand: a feverish desire to be everything and everyone, declaring that 'in every corner of my soul stands an altar to a different god.' The second impulse is toward a state of isolation and a sense of nothingness.

Of the first of these impulses: Campos is possessed of the Whitmanian desire to 'contain multitudes'. Critics have noted how Whitman's influence is partly apparent in the poems' sheer vitality; in the zest expressed for experience. Indeed Campos has in many respects outdone the poet who, by 'containing multitudes', had provided his muse: it seems the entire cosmos might yet not have exceeded his capacity to 'contain'. After chanting of all the places, all the ports, all the sights he's seen, '... all this,' we learn, 'which is so much, is nothing next to what I want.'

Campos' poems represent the exaltation of Pessoan anguish. His poems reflect an existentially anguished search for meaning. His poems are at once nostalgic and self-mocking. Laid bare in them are despair, terror and a poet's self questioning. Critics have suggested that the poems evoke an 'atmosphere of unreality', conjured up by an insistence on denial, negativity, absence and loss.

One of the poet's constant preoccupations is that of identity: he does not know who he is. The problem, it seems, is not that he doesn't know what to be; on the contrary: he wants to be too much. Everything, in fact. Failing to achieve this, he despairs. Unlike Alberto Caeiro, who asks nothing of life, he asks too much. In his poetic meditation 'Tobacco Shop' he asks:

"How should I know what I'll be, I who don't know what I am?
Be what I think? But I think of being so many things!"

Campos is allowed by Pessoa to be manic-depressive, exultant, violent, dynamic; he quests for nowhere and everywhere at once. His is an agonized doubt at the wasting of life; of life itself; of everything. For a critic he is 'par excellence the poet appalled by the emptiness of his own existence; lethargic, lacking in will-power, seeking inspiration, or at all events finding it, in semi-conscious states; in the twilight world between waking and sleeping; in dreams and in drunkenness'.

== See also ==
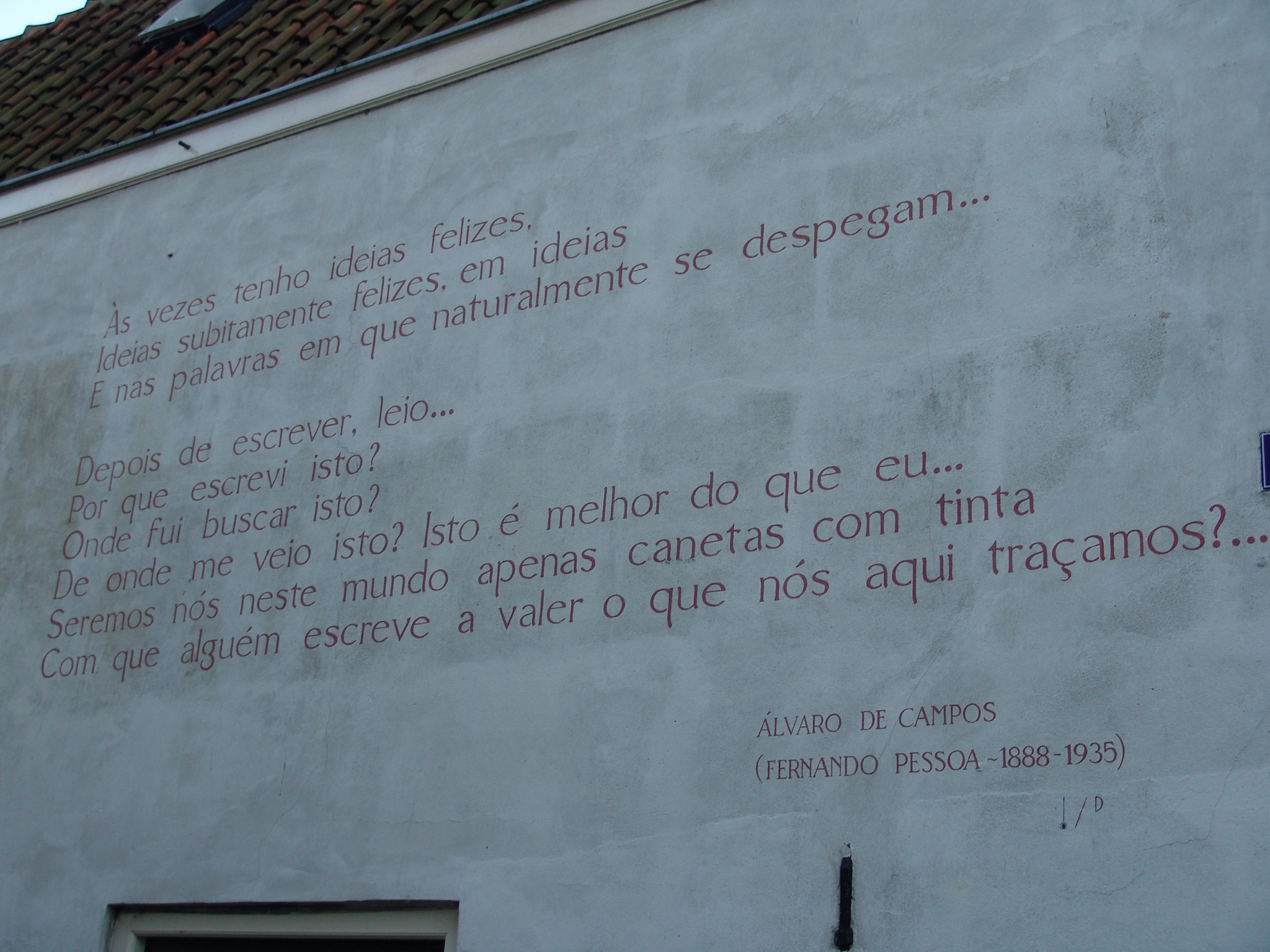
"Às vezes" by Álvaro de Campos on a wall in Leiden

- Orpheu
- Mário de Sá-Carneiro
- Portuguese Poetry
