= Quinet =

Quinet (pronounced [kinɛ]) is a French surname. Notable people with this surname include:

- Edgar Quinet (1803–1875), French historian
  - Edgar Quinet (Paris Métro)
  - Edgar Quinet-class cruiser
  - French cruiser Edgar Quinet
- Hermiona Quinet, married name of Hermiona Asachi (1821–1900), Romanian writer
- Marcel Quinet (1915–1986), Belgian pianist
