= Mário de Sá-Carneiro =

Portuguese poet and writer (1890–1916)

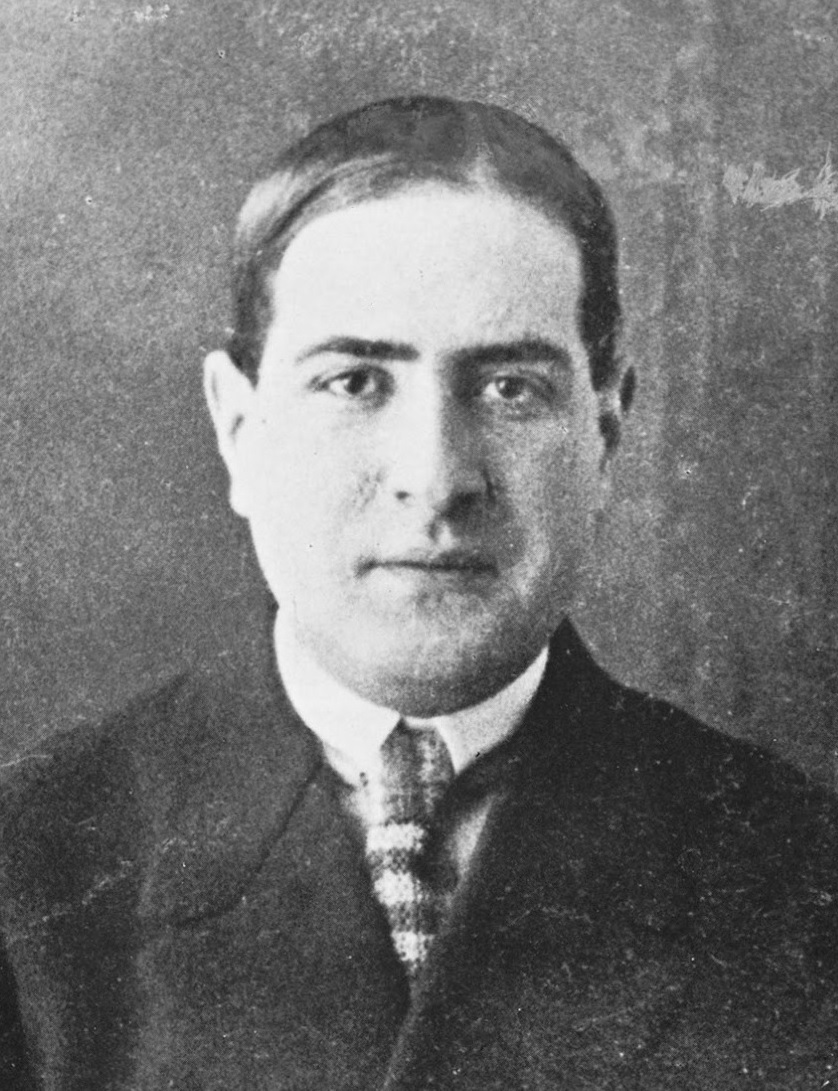
- Mário de Sá-Carneiro (1915)
- Born: May 19, 1890; Lisbon, Portugal
- Died: April 26, 1916 (aged 25); Paris, France
- Occupations: Poet and writer
- Writing career
- Language: Portuguese

Mário de Sá-Carneiro (pronounced [ˈmaɾju ðɨ ˈsa kɐɾˈnɐjɾu]; May 19, 1890 – April 26, 1916) was a Portuguese poet and writer. He is one of the best known authors of the Geração de Orpheu, and is usually considered their greatest poet, after Fernando Pessoa.

== Life ==
Mário de Sá-Carneiro was born to a wealthy family with a strong military tradition. His mother died in 1892 when he was two years old, and he was subsequently raised by his grandparents. He lived on a farm near Lisbon where he would spend most of his life. Sá-Carneiro started writing poems at the age of 12. By the age of 15, he had already translated several works by Victor Hugo. By 16, he had translated some works of Johann Wolfgang von Goethe and Friedrich Schiller. He began to write fiction in high school, partly due to his work as an actor. In 1911, he left for Coimbra, where he was admitted to law school, although he never progressed beyond his first year. However, he met a man who would soon become his closest friend, Fernando Pessoa, and who introduced him to the group of modernists of Lisbon.

After leaving the city of students, as Coimbra is known, Sá-Carneiro went to Paris to study at the Sorbonne. Although his father continued to pay for his studies, Sá-Carneiro stopped attending classes very soon after arriving in Paris. He lived a bohemian lifestyle, roaming round the theatres and bars.

It was in Paris that he met Guilherme de Santa-Rita (Santa-Rita Pintor), the legendary Portuguese painter.

=== Orpheu ===
Together with Fernando Pessoa and Almada Negreiros, he wrote for Orpheu, a literary journal of poetry and artistic prose influenced by cosmopolitanism and the European Avant-Garde. The magazine caused a scandal in Portuguese society because of its futuristic idealism. Only two issues of the magazine were published. A third one was prepared but never published, owing to the controversy surrounding the magazine and a lack of money. Today, Orpheu is known for being one of the finest and most important examples of Portuguese literature, and for introducing modernism in Portugal.

=== Depression ===
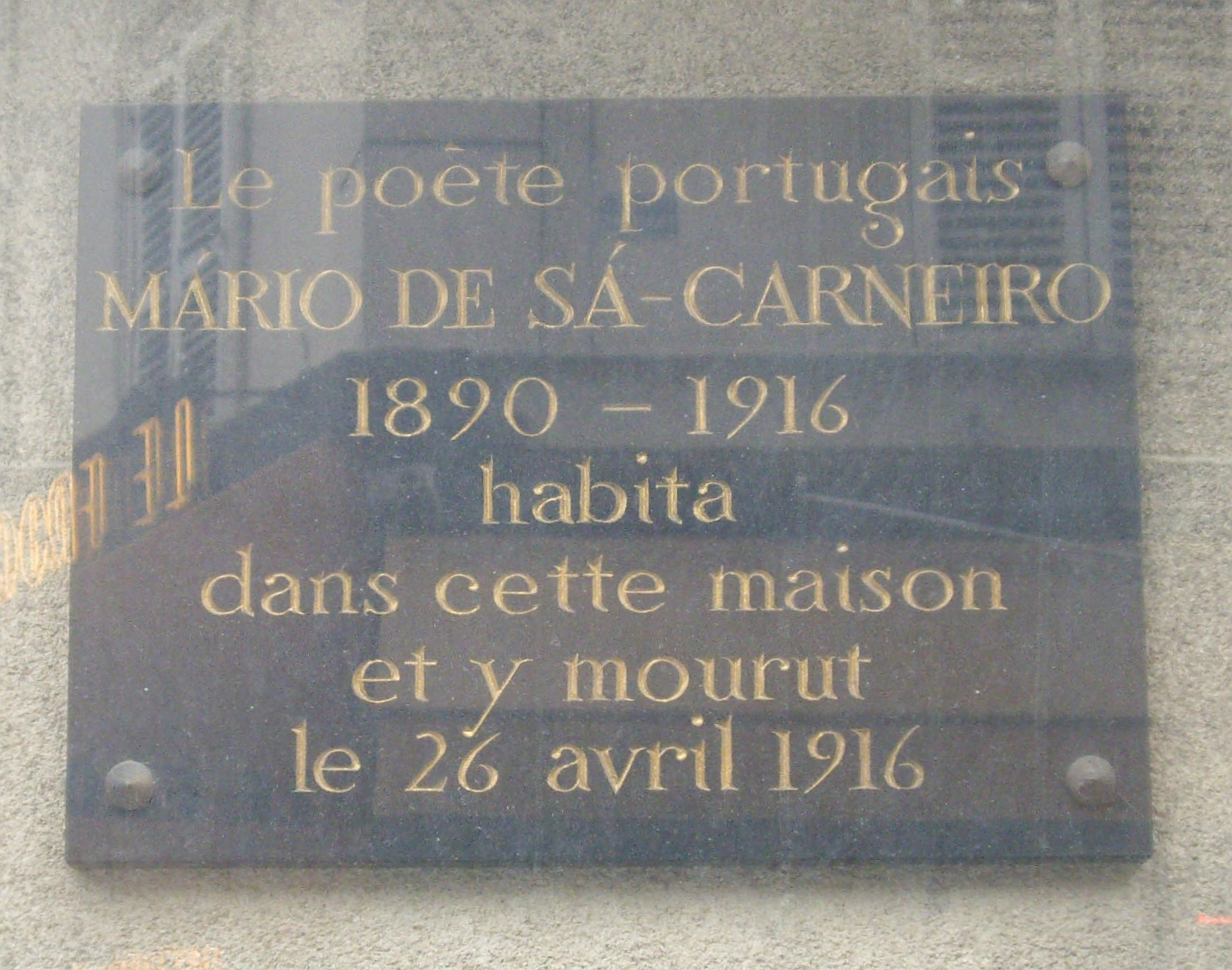
Sá-Carneiro memorial slab on the building where he committed suicide on April 26, 1916 (Rue Victor-Massé 29, Paris).

In July 1915, Sá-Carneiro returned to Paris by train. He planned, with Fernando Pessoa, to publish issue no. 3 of Orpheu, but his father and sponsor of the magazine, living in Mozambique at the time, refused to disburse more money. While World War I was in progress in the north of France, he left the university and started a relationship with a prostitute. A few months later, with growing financial problems and depression, Sá-Carneiro wrote a dramatic letter to Fernando Pessoa on March 31, 1916:

"Unless there occurs a miracle, next Monday, March (or even the day before), your friend Mário de Sá-Carneiro will take a strong dose of strychnine and disappear from this world."

Extremely unhappy with his life, he still delayed the suicide by almost one month. But, as he had proclaimed, at the age of 25 he killed himself. Orpheu no. 3 was never published.

== Work ==
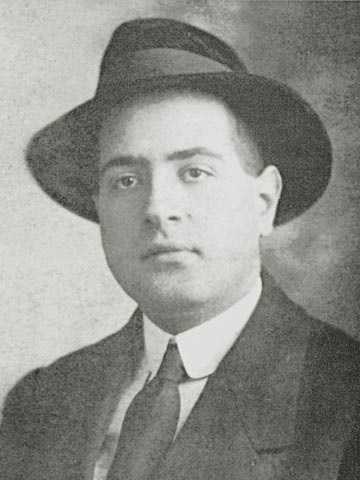
Mário de Sá-Carneiro

In 1910, he wrote his first play, Amizade (the title means friendship), in partnership with Tomás Cabreira Júnior.

On the 9th of January 1911, Tomás Cabreira Júnior fatally shot himself with a shotgun in the middle of the school's playground, causing Sá-Carneiro to write the poem "A um suicida" (To a suicidal).

In 1912, he published Príncipio, a collection of novellas dedicated to his father.

In 1913, he published A Confissão de Lúcio, one of his most famous works. This novella has a story where the fantastic reigns and it's a mirror to this age of Avant-garde.

In 1915, the work Céu em Fogo, that gathered twelve novellas, was published. This book reveals the obsessions and disturbances that Sá-Carneiro was living with at the time.

Sá-Carneiro's first publication of poetry was Dispersão, published in 1913, which included twelve poems. He wrote another book, Indícios de Oiro, but it was not published until over twenty years after his death, in the magazine Presença. In 1946 these two books were published along with some of Sá-Carneiro's poems in the Orpheu magazine as a unique book.

His literary influences include Edgar Allan Poe, Oscar Wilde, Charles Baudelaire, Stéphane Mallarmé, Fyodor Dostoevsky, Cesário Verde and António Nobre.

English poet Ted Hughes translated three of his poems into English. American poet Sylvia Plath also admired his work, in particular his novel A Confissão de Lúcio (Lúcio's Confession).

== Centennial Anniversary of Mário de Sá-Carneiro's death ==
The 100th anniversary of Mário de Sá-Carneiro's death, on April 26, 2016, was highlighted in Portugal and abroad with a number of publications and events, such as the colloquium "Sá-Carneiro et les autres" (Paris), the exhibit "Mil Anos Me Separam de Amanhã" (Paredes de Coura), integrated in the festival Realizar-Poesia, an exhibit at the Biblioteca Nacional de Portugal, titled "Mário de Sá-Carneiro, 'O Homem São Louco'", and a conference and audio-theatre at the Casa Fernando Pessoa.
