= Abel Salazar =

Abel Salazar may refer to:

- Abel Salazar (actor) (1917-1995), Mexican film actor, producer and director
- Abel Salazar (scientist) (1889-1946), Portuguese physician, lecturer, researcher, writer and painter
