= CAUP =

CAUP may refer to:

- College of Architecture and Urban Planning, now College of Built Environments, at the University of Washington, US
- Centre for Astrophysics of the University of Porto, Portugal
