= Adelaide Estrada =

Portuguese medical researcher

- Born: Adelaide Augusta Fernandes Estrada; 29 September 1898; Porto, Portugal
- Died: 18 October 1979 (Aged 81); Porto
- Occupation: Medical researcher
- Known for: Second woman in Portugal to obtain PhD in biology; collaboration with Abel Salazar

Adelaide Augusta Fernandes Estrada (1898 – 1979) was a Portuguese medical doctor and researcher. She was only the second Portuguese woman to obtain a PhD in biological sciences and to join the Portuguese Biology Society, being admitted in March 1928.

== Early life ==
Adelaide Augusta Fernandes Estrada was born on 29 September 1898 in the Porto parish of Vitória. She went to school at the Liceu Alexandre Herculano in Porto. Following her father's death in 1913, she worked at a hospital part-time in order to be able to complete her school studies. In October 1921, she started a medical course at the Faculty of Medicine of the University of Porto (FMUP), where she would later be a lecturer. Estrada completed her first degree in 1927. As a student, she was invited to work at the Institute of Histology and Embryology of FMUP in 1922. There she met Abel Salazar, with whom she would subsequently collaborate on various research activities and become close friends. Salazar was also an artist and did several paintings of Estrada, including a nude, which she used for her Ex Libris.

== Medical career ==
In 1923, she was appointed as a histology assistant, and three years later, she was appointed as the preparer of the Clinical Analysis Laboratory of FMUP. In 1932, she was made an assistant at the Infectious Diseases Clinic at FMUP. In 1941, she began an internship at the Centre for Microscopic Studies of the University of Porto. This centre was created as a means of reinstating Abel Salazar, by then a professor, who had been removed from his previous post in 1935 because of his opposition to the Estado Novo regime. She stayed there until the Centre closed after Salazar's death in 1946. Her research at FMUP and at the Centre for Microscopic Studies led to a large body of journal articles, including "Meningeal Syndromes and Abnormal Acute Meningitis", "Questions of Hematological Nomenclature" and "The Hematological Indexes Have No Diagnostic Value".

During her career, Estrada was a member of the Portuguese Biology Society (1928), the Association of Anatomists, and the Société Internationale d’Hematologie. She retired in 1950 and established a private laboratory in Porto in 1952.

== Politics ==
At a time when many obstacles were still faced by women and few were able to express their ideas publicly, Estrada collaborated with the magazine Pensamento (Thought), an organ of the Socialist Culture Institute, which was published in Porto, and with O Sol Nascente (The Rising Sun), in which women wrote about the female condition and about the need for more active participation in society by women. She also wrote for Esfera, a Brazilian magazine. Estrada was an opponent of the Estado Novo regime and supported the presidential campaigns of José Norton de Matos in 1949 and Humberto Delgado in 1958.

== Publications ==
Some of Estrada's publications were:

- 1935 - Regarding the first Kalazar case in Portugal
- 1936 - Diagnostic puncture or cytopuncture
- 1936 - Questions of hematological nomenclature
- 1937 - Still regarding the first adult Kalazar case in Portugal
- 1938 - The third case of Kalazar of the adult in Portugal (with Nery de Oliveira)
- 1942 - The new theory of Prof. Abel Salazar on granulocytes
- 1943 - Arneth formula and hematological indexes in the face of the new neutrophil theory
- 1944 - Abel Salazar's new ideas and theories on the cytological balance of blood and its disorders
- 1944 - New case of adult Kalazar in Portugal (with Emídio Ribeiro)
- 1944 - The graphic method, by A. L. Salazar, in the study of neutrocyte balance
- 1945 - On nuclear shadows

== Death ==
Adelaide Augusta Fernandes Estrada died on 18 October 1979.

== Awards and honours ==
- In 2019, an exhibition entitled Adelaide Estrada: Beyond Science was held at the Abel Salazar House-Museum in Porto. This was part of a series of exhibitions under the heading And Yet, They Move! Women in Arts and Sciences! This was organized to honour the contribution of women in different professional areas, who have exceeded the social and cultural limits placed on women.
- Since 1999, she has been the only female doctor whose name is part of the toponymy of Porto, with a road named after her.
