= University of Porto =

Public research university in Porto, Portugal

Coordinates: 41°08′48″N 8°36′56″W

- Universidade do Porto
- The university's emblem, the figure of Minerva
- Motto: Virtus unita fortius agit
- Type: Public research university
- Established: 22 March 1911; 115 years ago
- Affiliations: EUA, IAU, CESAER, EUGLOH
- Budget: €356.8 million (2026)
- Rector: Pedro Nuno Teixeira
- Academic staff: 3,609, plus 413 researchers (2025)
- Administrative staff: 1,913 (2025)
- Students: 35,815 (2024/25)
- Location: Porto, Portugal
- Campus: Urban
- Colours: Old gold
- Website: www.up.pt
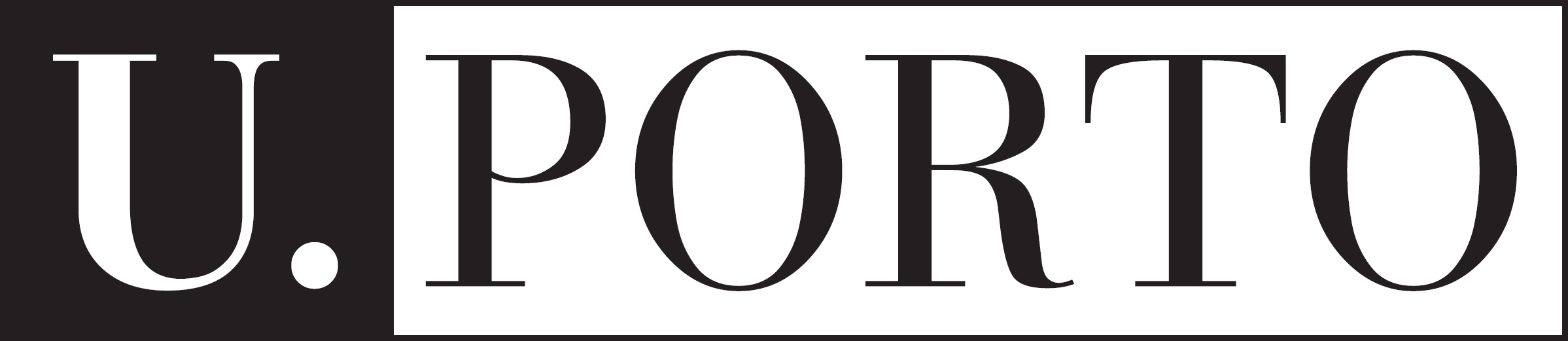

The University of Porto (Portuguese: Universidade do Porto, U.Porto) is a public research university in Porto, Portugal, and one of the country's leading institutions of higher education and scientific research. It was created by decree of the provisional government of the First Portuguese Republic on 22 March 1911, at the same time as the University of Lisbon, on the basis of schools founded in the city from 1762 onwards, which had given rise to the Polytechnic Academy (1837) and the Medical-Surgical School (1836). Since 2009 it has been a public foundation governed by private law. It comprises fifteen constituent units – thirteen faculties, the Abel Salazar Institute of Biomedical Sciences and the Nursing School – and, excluding the Nursing School, had 35,815 students in 2024/25, of whom 4,536 were doctoral candidates; international students, of 119 nationalities, made up 14% of the total.

The university is associated with the Porto school of architecture, which produced the two Portuguese winners of the Pritzker Architecture Prize, and with a tradition of biomedical research, particularly on familial amyloid polyneuropathy and hereditary diffuse gastric cancer. Its first Faculty of Letters (1919–1928), where the philosopher Leonardo Coimbra taught, is regarded by some authors as the origin of a Porto school of philosophy. Its former students and teachers include the writers Camilo Castelo Branco, Júlio Dinis and Jorge de Sena, the physician and scientist Abel Salazar and two presidents of Portugal.

An urban university, it is organised in three campuses integrated into the city – in the city centre, at Campo Alegre and at Asprela – and has further facilities in Matosinhos, Vila do Conde and Vila Nova de Gaia. Between 2020 and 2024 its researchers signed 24% of the citable Portuguese scientific documents indexed in the Web of Science. It is placed among the top three Portuguese institutions in the main general rankings, and in the 2025 CWTS Leiden Ranking it was the Portuguese university with the most publications among the 10% most cited in the world.

The university runs a science and technology park, UPTEC, and twelve museum spaces, the largest of which is the Museum of Natural History and Science. Its student traditions include the Queima das Fitas, which grew out of a celebration of final-year medical students first held in 1920, and its University Stadium, opened at Campo Alegre in 1953, was the first university stadium in Portugal.

== History ==
=== Origins (1762–1911) ===
The university descends from schools created in Porto from the 18th century onwards, such as the Nautical Class (Aula de Náutica), established by King Joseph I in 1762, and the Drawing Class (Aula de Debuxo e Desenho), created by Queen Maria I in 1779. It was founded mainly on two institutions created under the reforms of Passos Manuel: the Polytechnic Academy (1837), successor to the Royal Academy of the Navy and Commerce (1803), which trained engineers, naval officers, pilots, merchants, farmers, factory managers and artists; and the Medical-Surgical School (1836), successor to the Royal School of Surgery (1825) and attached to the Santo António Hospital.

=== From 1911 to 1974 ===
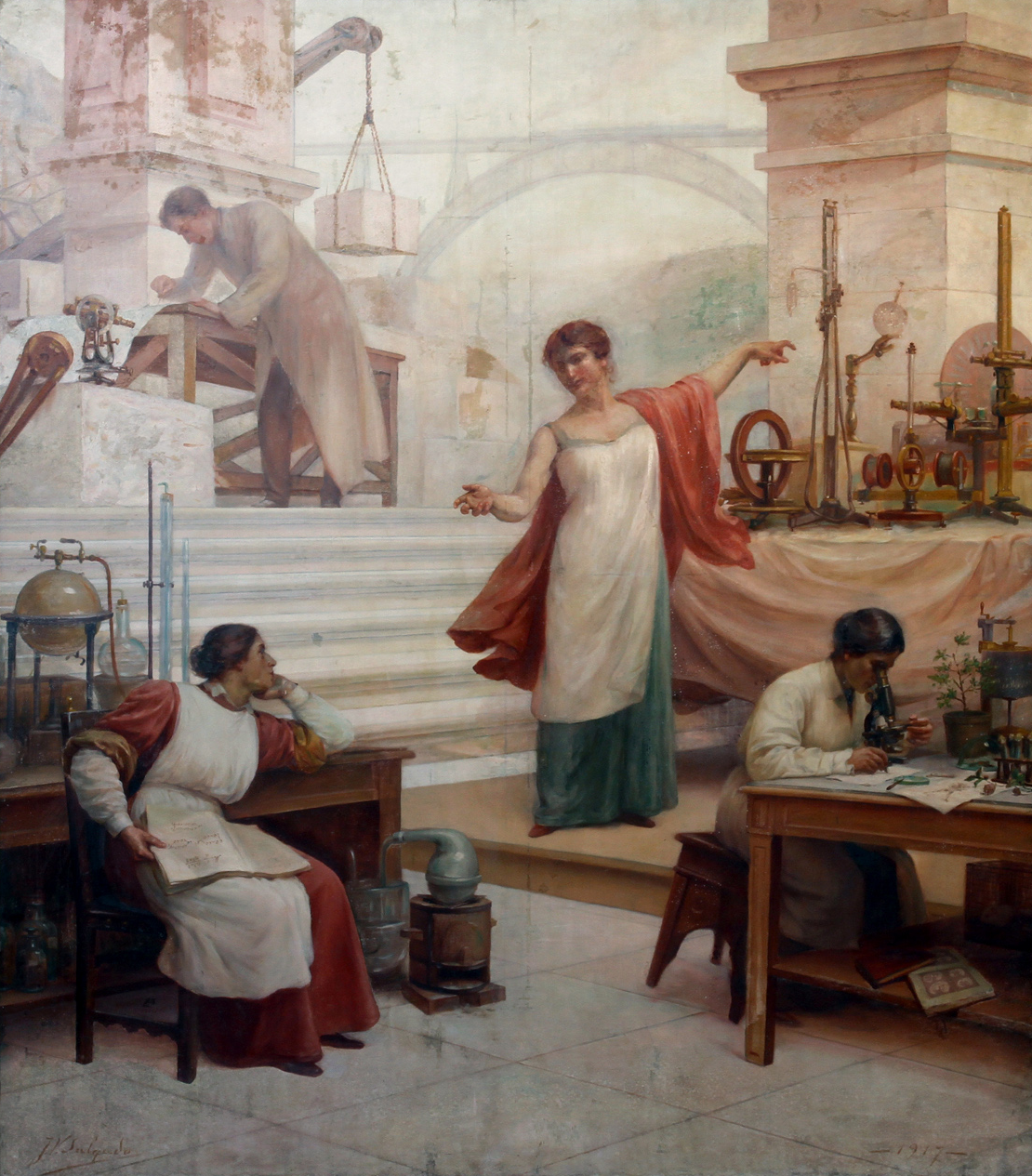
The Physical and Natural Sciences

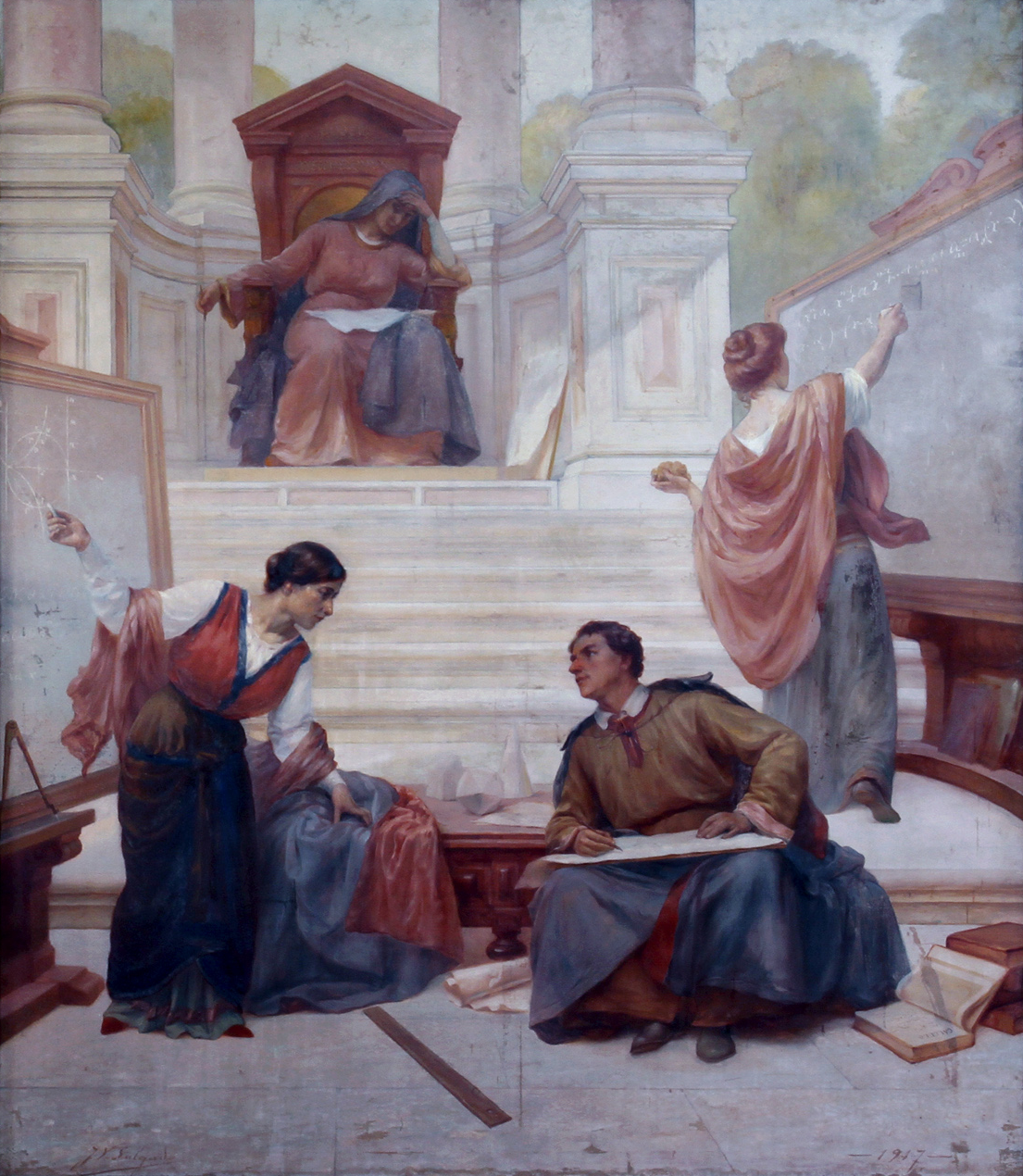
Mathematics

Paintings by Veloso Salgado (1917) on the Noble Staircase of the Rectorate building

Created by decree on 22 March 1911, together with the University of Lisbon, the University of Porto ended the University of Coimbra's monopoly on university education in Portugal. It initially consisted of the Faculty of Sciences, which absorbed the engineering chairs of the Polytechnic Academy, and the Faculty of Medicine, with an attached School of Pharmacy; its first rector was the mathematician Francisco Gomes Teixeira. The Technical Faculty (1915), later the Faculty of Engineering, the Faculty of Letters (1919), the Faculty of Pharmacy (1921) and the Faculty of Economics (1953) followed. The first Faculty of Letters, where Leonardo Coimbra taught and whose students included Agostinho da Silva, Delfim Santos and Álvaro Ribeiro, was abolished in 1928 and re-established in 1961. Under the military dictatorship and the Estado Novo, the university lost teachers in the waves of dismissals of 1935 and 1947, among them Abel Salazar and Ruy Luís Gomes; after the Carnation Revolution of 25 April 1974, Ruy Luís Gomes returned to the university as its rector.

=== Since 1974 ===
After 1974 the university expanded into all the major fields of knowledge. Between 1975 and 1996 the Abel Salazar Institute of Biomedical Sciences and the faculties of Sport, Architecture, Psychology and Education Sciences, Dental Medicine, Fine Arts, Law, and Nutrition and Food Sciences were added to the six existing faculties. From the 1990s onwards the faculties gradually moved into new buildings on the Asprela and Campo Alegre campuses. In 2009 the university became a public higher education institution with the status of a foundation; in its centenary year, 2011, it was made an Honorary Member of the Order of Saint James of the Sword; and in 2024 it began to incorporate the Porto Nursing School, a process completed in December 2025.

=== Symbols ===
The university's motto, Virtus unita fortius agit, had been that of the Polytechnic Academy. Its traditional emblem is the figure of Minerva, the Roman goddess of handicrafts, the professions, the arts and, later, war, who was commonly identified with the Greek Athena and formed the Capitoline Triad with Jupiter and Juno. The university's identity manual presents Minerva as its principal image, standing for lofty thought, letters, music, the arts, wisdom and intelligence, and reserves it for formal uses such as the sealing of documents, diplomas of merit and the watermark of official paper.

On the seal, the figure is seated beneath a Gothic canopy, holding a sceptre in her right hand and an open book in her left; at her feet a quartered shield combines the arms of Portugal and the old arms of the city of Porto, the Virgin and Child between two towers. (Note: The arrangement of the shield – the arms of Portugal in the first and fourth quarters, the old arms of the city in the second and third, and an inescutcheon over all – corresponds to that of the arms granted to the city of Porto by royal charter of 14 January 1837, which remained in force until ordinance no. 9513 of 25 April 1940.) A "sphragistic emblem" for the university was approved in 1925. The medal designed by the sculptor João da Silva for the centenaries of 1937 became the university's symbol in 1940 and has been its doctoral medal since 1994. In January 2003 the university Senate approved the doctoral dress, the motto replaced the legend Portucalensis Universitas around the medal, and old gold replaced pink as the university's colour. The visual identity introduced in March 2004 added the "U.Porto" logotype and kept a retouched Minerva, accompanied by the motto and the dates 1762, when public instruction began in Porto, and 1911.

University Day, instituted in 1999, is celebrated on 22 March, the anniversary of the university's foundation.

== Campus ==
The University of Porto is an urban university distributed across three campuses in Porto – the city centre (Pole 1), Asprela (Pole 2) and Campo Alegre (Pole 3) – with further facilities in Vila do Conde, Vila Nova de Gaia and Matosinhos. The distribution follows its history: for its first fifty years the university occupied inherited or adapted buildings in the city centre; from 1949 it grew over the former estates of Campo Alegre, above the Douro; and from the 1970s it built new complexes at Asprela, next to the São João Hospital.

=== City centre (Pole 1) ===
The Rectorate building faces Praça de Gomes Teixeira, named in 1933 after the first rector and known as Praça dos Leões after the fountain that has stood there since 1886; nearby are the Clérigos Tower, the former Court of Appeal and prison, now the Portuguese Centre of Photography, and the Santo António Hospital. The building houses the Rectorate, the Casa Comum cultural centre and the central unit of the Museum of Natural History and Science. The Abel Salazar Building, former seat of the Medical-Surgical School, the Faculty of Medicine and the ICBAS, was refurbished and reopened in 2026.

Since 2012 the ICBAS and the Faculty of Pharmacy have shared a complex on the site of the former Quartel da Torre da Marca, a military barracks on Rua de D. Manuel II. Designed by José Manuel Soares, it comprises three new teaching and laboratory buildings and the rehabilitated historic building facing the street, near the Santo António Hospital, where the ICBAS conducts its clinical teaching. The Faculty of Law has occupied since 2004 the building on Rua dos Bragas originally built for the Faculty of Engineering, and the Faculty of Fine Arts is centred on the Palacete Braguinha, whose gardens hold sculptures by António Soares dos Reis and other artists. The city centre also houses the Institute of Public Health, a unit of the Nursing School and a centre of UPTEC, the university's science and technology park.

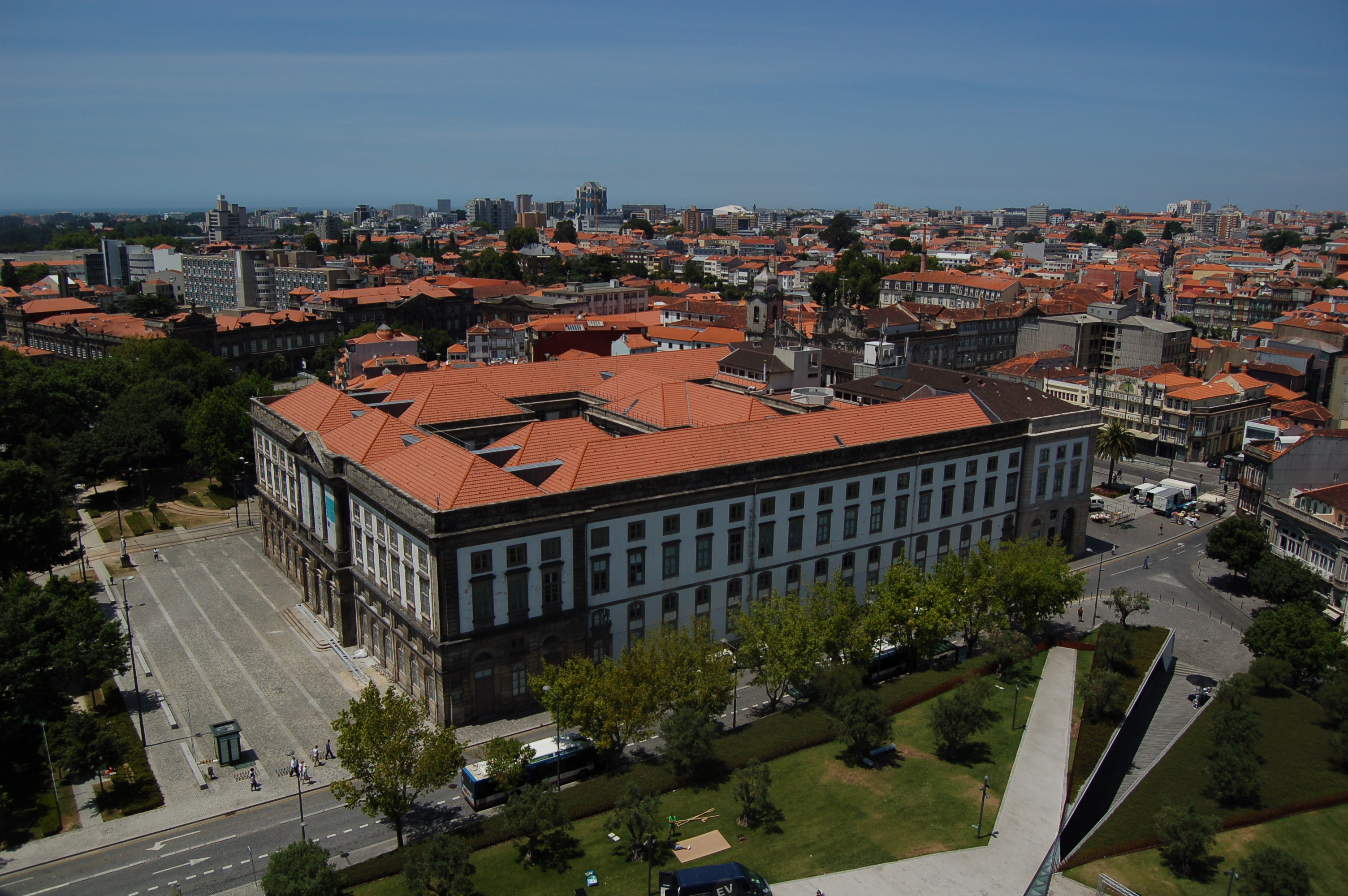
The Rectorate and the Cordoaria Garden seen from the Clérigos Tower, in 2015

The Rectorate building on Praça de Gomes Teixeira, in 2025

The Palacete Braguinha, seat of the Faculty of Fine Arts, in 2025

The Faculty of Law on Rua dos Bragas, in 2024

The ICBAS and Faculty of Pharmacy complex, designed by José Manuel Soares and opened in 2012, in 2025

=== Asprela (Pole 2) ===
Pole 2, in the parish of Paranhos on the northern edge of the city, brings together the faculties of Engineering, Economics, Medicine, Dental Medicine, Sport, and Psychology and Education Sciences, the headquarters of the Nursing School, the research institutes i3S, INESC TEC and INEGI, and two UPTEC centres. The Faculty of Medicine moved into the São João Hospital complex in 1959; (Note: The Faculty of Medicine gives 1959 as the year it moved into the São João Hospital complex; the university's historical archive (Memória U.Porto) gives 1960.) the Faculty of Economics building, completed in 1974, was followed by those of Dental Medicine (1997), Engineering (2000) and Psychology and Education Sciences (2005).

The Quinta de Lamas Park (2015) and the Asprela Central Park (2022) brought the Asprela stream back into the open. The Central Park, developed by the city council, the university and the Polytechnic of Porto on more than six hectares of university land, also acts as a 10,000 m³ retention basin during heavy rain. The campus is served by line D of the Porto Metro.

Aerial view of the Asprela campus, in 2024

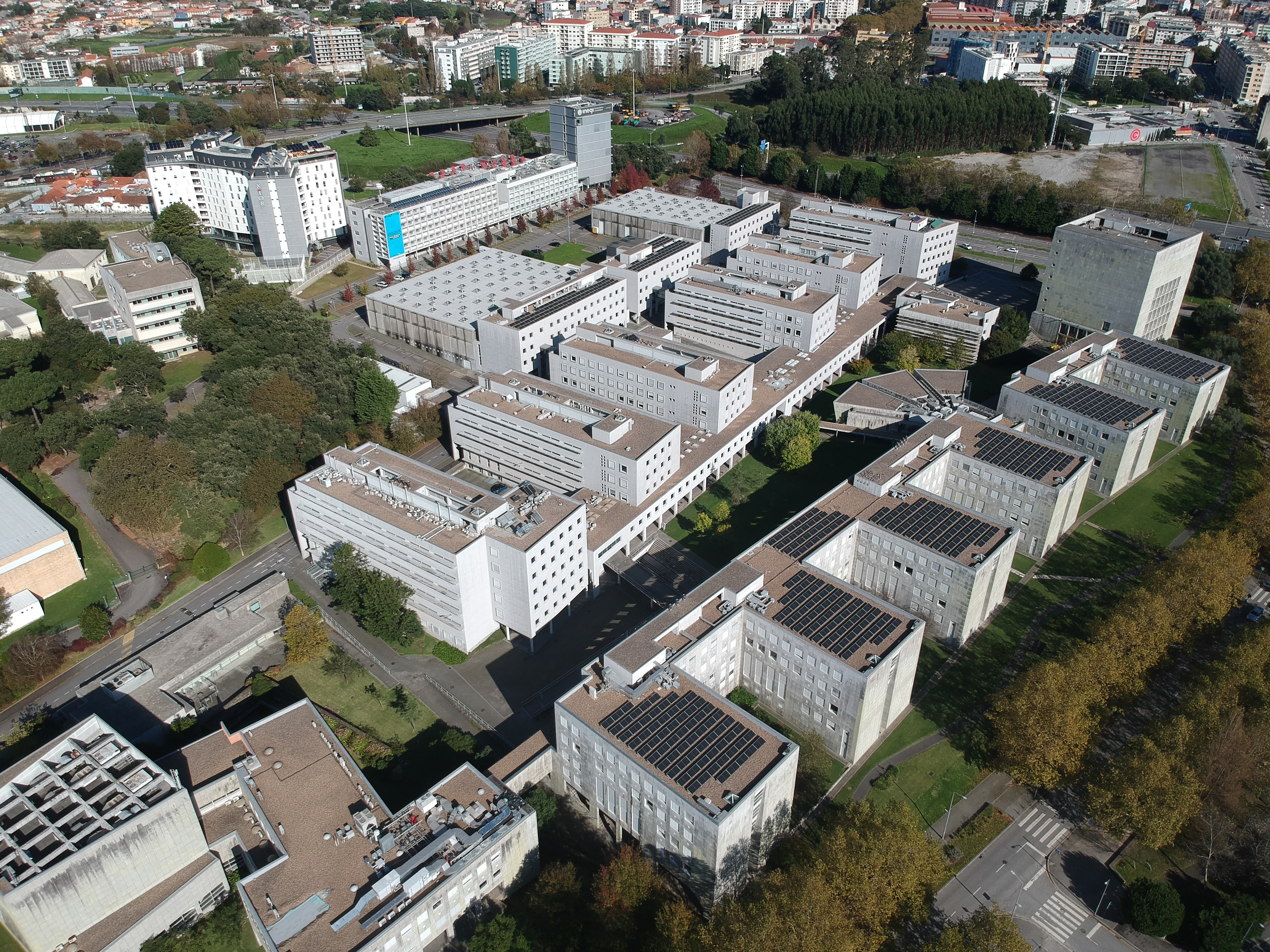
The Faculty of Engineering, in 2024

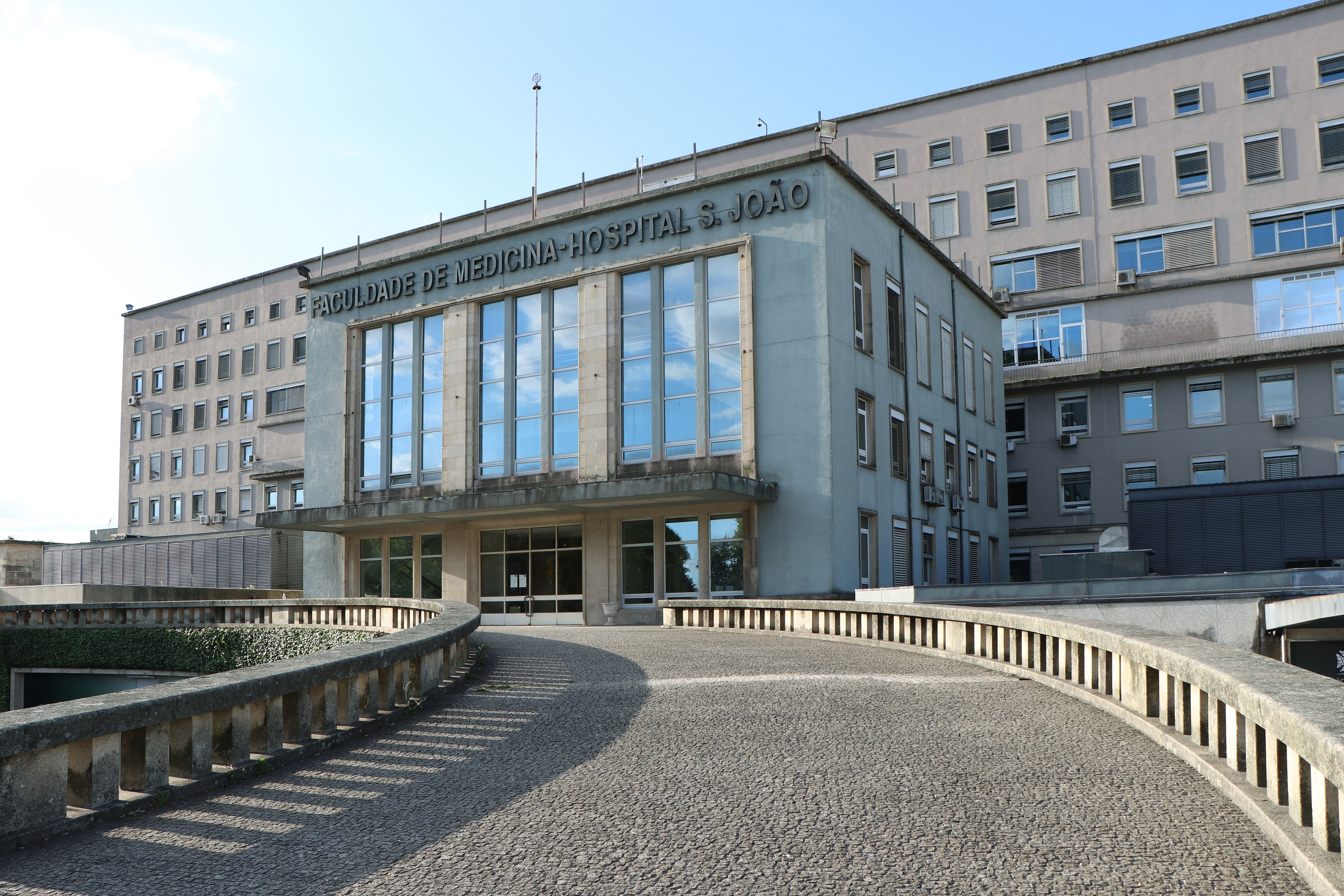
The Faculty of Medicine, in the São João Hospital complex, in 2023

=== Campo Alegre (Pole 3) ===
Pole 3 occupies the slope above the mouth of the Douro, in Lordelo do Ouro, next to the Arrábida Bridge. It grew around former estates: the Quinta do Campo Alegre, bought in 1895 by the grandparents of the writers Sophia de Mello Breyner Andresen and Ruben A., was acquired by the state in 1949 and became the Botanical Garden in 1951; its mansion, the Casa Andresen, houses the Biodiversity Gallery. The nearby Casa Burmester houses the Casa dos Livros.

The campus brings together the Faculty of Sciences, concentrated there since 2007, the faculties of Arts and Humanities (since 1995), Nutrition and Food Sciences (since 2020) and Architecture, the Porto Planetarium, the Institute of Astrophysics and Space Sciences and the University Stadium (1953). The Faculty of Architecture building, by Álvaro Siza, is one of the eight works in the nomination "Architectural Works of Álvaro Siza in Portugal" for inscription on the UNESCO World Heritage List, coordinated by the faculty since 2021; the World Heritage Committee deferred its decision in July 2025.

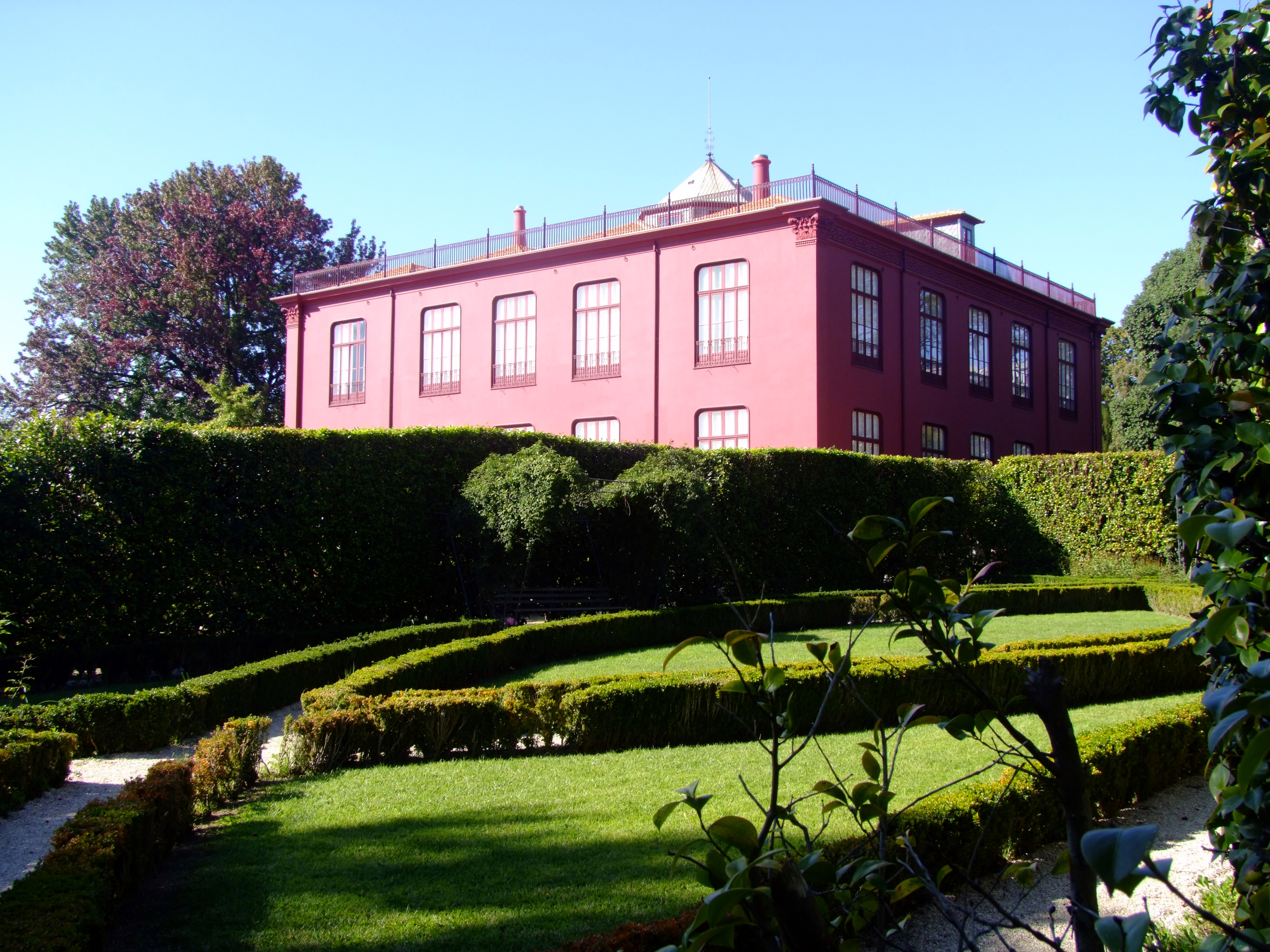
The Casa Andresen in the Porto Botanical Garden, in 2011

A blue whale skeleton in the Biodiversity Gallery, in 2017

The Faculty of Sciences from the air, in 2011

The Faculty of Arts and Humanities, in 2007

=== Other locations ===
The Port of Leixões Cruise Terminal, which houses CIIMAR, in 2023

Elsewhere in Porto are the Augusto Nobre Marine Zoology Station, in Foz do Douro, and the Marques da Silva Foundation, in the home and studio of the architect José Marques da Silva. In Vila Nova de Gaia are the Geophysical Institute and the Astronomical Observatory; in Matosinhos, the Interdisciplinary Centre of Marine and Environmental Research (CIIMAR), in the Port of Leixões Cruise Terminal, the Porto Business School and the Abel Salazar House-Museum; and in Vairão (Vila do Conde), the Research Centre in Biodiversity and Genetic Resources (CIBIO), the BIOPOLIS association and veterinary facilities of the ICBAS.

=== Architecture ===
The Faculty of Architecture, designed by Álvaro Siza (1986–1993), in 2025

The faculty library, in 2011

The university's buildings combine inherited structures – the former orphans' college that housed the Royal Academy of the Navy and Commerce and the Polytechnic Academy and is now the Rectorate, 19th-century mansions and a former barracks – with buildings designed from the mid-20th century onwards, several of them by former students.

The Porto school of architecture, formed at the Porto School of Fine Arts and continued by the Faculty of Architecture from 1979, is associated with the reform of teaching led by Carlos Ramos from 1952 and, according to part of the historiography, above all with Fernando Távora. It produced Álvaro Siza and Eduardo Souto de Moura, the two Portuguese winners of the Pritzker Architecture Prize, in 1992 and 2011. Purpose-built university buildings include the Faculty of Economics, by Alfredo Viana de Lima (1974); the Faculty of Architecture, by Siza (1986–1993); the Faculty of Engineering, by Pedro Ramalho (2000); the Faculty of Psychology and Education Sciences, by Távora (2005); and the i3S, by Serôdio, Furtado & Associados (2016).

== Organisation and administration ==
=== Governance ===
The university is governed by the statutes of the University of Porto Foundation, annexed to Decree-Law no. 96/2009 of 27 April, and by its own statutes, ratified in 2015 and amended in 2025 to include the Nursing School. The General Council, with 23 members – teachers and researchers, a representative of the non-teaching staff, students and co-opted external members – elects the rector, sets tuition fees and approves the strategic plan. The Board of Trustees, a body specific to the foundation regime, ratifies the election of the rector, appoints the Management Council and approves the university's plans and draft budget. The Management Council is responsible for administrative, property, financial and human-resources management, and the Senate is the consultative body through which the constituent units take part in the running of the university. The General Council has been chaired by Luís Portela, Alfredo José de Sousa, Artur Santos Silva and, since 2021, Fernando Freire de Sousa. Since 22 June 2026 the rector has been Pedro Nuno Teixeira, a full professor at the School of Economics and Management and the university's 21st rector.

The rectors of the university since 1911 have been:

- Francisco Gomes Teixeira (1911–1917)
- Cândido Augusto Correia de Pinho (1918–1919)
- Augusto Pereira Nobre (1919–1926)
- José Alfredo Mendes de Magalhães (1926–1928)
- Alexandre Alberto de Sousa Pinto (1928–1931)
- Alberto Eduardo Plácido (1931–1932)
- José Pereira Salgado (1934–1943)
- António José Adriano Rodrigues (1943–1945)
- Amândio Joaquim Tavares (1945–1961)
- Manuel Correia de Barros, Jr. (1961–1969)
- António de Sousa Pereira (1969–1974)
- Ruy Luís Gomes (1974–1975)
- Manuel da Silva Pinto (1976–1978)
- Armando de Araújo Martins Campos e Matos (1978–1981)
- Luís António de Oliveira Ramos (1982–1985)
- Alberto Manuel Sampaio e Castro Amaral (1985–1998)
- José Ângelo da Mota Novais Barbosa (1998–2006)
- José Carlos Diogo Marques dos Santos (2006–2014)
- Sebastião José Cabral Feyo de Azevedo (2014–2018)
- António Sousa Pereira (2018–2026)
- Pedro Nuno Teixeira (since 2026)

The portraits of the rectors of the university's first century, a series of oil paintings begun in 1950 under the rector Amândio Tavares and inaugurated in January 1954, hang in the Council Room of the Rectorate building; most of them were painted by former students of the schools that preceded the university, among them Joaquim Lopes, Abel de Moura, Agostinho Salgado and Guilherme Camarinha.

=== Finance ===
The university's budget for 2026 was set at €356.8 million. In 2025, transfers from the state budget for current expenditure amounted to €169 million and covered 84% of staff costs; in the same year about €30 million of investment in student housing was under way, partly financed by Portugal's Recovery and Resilience Plan.

=== Faculties and schools ===
The university comprises fifteen teaching and research units: thirteen faculties, the Abel Salazar Institute of Biomedical Sciences and the Nursing School.

Constituent units of the University of Porto
Unit (Note: The box next to each name shows the unit's identity colour, as defined in the university's graphic standards and used on its portal; the Nursing School, integrated in 2024, is not covered by the standards, and its colour is the one used on the portal.)	Acronym	Established (Note: The years given are those of the legal creation of the unit or of its integration into the university. Memória U.Porto gives 1977 for the Faculty of Psychology and Education Sciences, the year of the Higher Course in Psychology, and 1992 for the Faculty of Nutrition and Food Sciences, the year of its approval by the Senate; the faculties themselves give 1980 (Decree-Law no. 529/80 of 5 November) and 1996 (ministerial order of 17 July). The Abel Salazar Institute of Biomedical Sciences began teaching in 1976 and the Faculty of Law in December 1995.)	Campus
Faculty of Architecture	FAUP	1979	Campo Alegre
Faculty of Fine Arts	FBAUP	1992	City centre
Faculty of Sciences	FCUP	1911	Campo Alegre
Faculty of Nutrition and Food Sciences	FCNAUP	1996	Campo Alegre
Faculty of Sport	FADEUP	1975	Asprela
Faculty of Law	FDUP	1994	City centre
School of Economics and Management	FEP	1953	Asprela
Faculty of Engineering	FEUP	1915	Asprela
Faculty of Pharmacy	FFUP	1921	City centre
Faculty of Arts and Humanities	FLUP	1919 (re-established 1961)	Campo Alegre
Faculty of Medicine	FMUP	1911	Asprela
Faculty of Dental Medicine	FMDUP	1989	Asprela
Faculty of Psychology and Education Sciences	FPCEUP	1980	Asprela
Abel Salazar Institute of Biomedical Sciences	ICBAS	1975	City centre
Nursing School	ESEP	2024	Asprela and city centre

The Porto Business School, in Matosinhos, is the university's business school.

== Academic profile ==
=== Teaching and admissions ===
Degree programmes follow the three-cycle structure of the Bologna Process, leading to bachelor's (licenciatura), master's and doctoral degrees; in architecture, medicine, dental medicine, veterinary medicine and pharmaceutical sciences, integrated master's programmes combine the first two cycles. For 2026/27 the university offered 62 bachelor's and integrated master's programmes and more than 280 master's and doctoral programmes.

In the first phase of the 2026 national admissions competition, the university filled 5,064 of its 5,111 places (99.1%), the highest rate among the universities. According to the university, the average entry score of its admitted students, 163.4 points on a scale of 0 to 200, was the highest among the public universities, and 45 of its 62 programmes had the highest entry scores in the country in their fields. (Note: The university's "Facts and Figures" page presents the same value as the "average score of the last candidate admitted".) The bachelor's degree in Aerospace Engineering had the highest last-admitted score in the country, 195.0 points.

=== Internationalisation ===
The university has more than 2,700 agreements with foreign universities and more than 1,500 outgoing mobility students, and took part in 223 projects of the Erasmus+ programme between 2014 and 2022; in 2018 it was the Portuguese institution that sent the most students abroad under Erasmus+. It is a founding member of the European University Alliance for Global Health (EUGLOH), created in 2019 with eight other European universities, and belongs to networks such as the European University Association, the International Association of Universities, the Association of Portuguese Language Universities and the Tordesillas Group. In research it has taken part in more than 490 Actions of the European Cooperation in Science and Technology (COST) programme and in two Knowledge and Innovation Communities of the European Institute of Innovation and Technology, EIT Health and EIT Culture & Creativity.

=== Research ===
==== Organisation and output ====
Research is organised in 45 research and development units, 11 associated research institutes, 16 associate laboratories and 21 collaborative laboratories, among other structures. In the 2023/24 evaluation by the Foundation for Science and Technology (FCT), 93% of the units in the university's ecosystem were rated "Excellent" or "Very Good". Among the associated institutes, the i3S – Institute for Research and Innovation in Health, opened in 2016, was described at the time by the Lusa News Agency as the largest Portuguese research institute in the health sciences; its building also houses the Institute for Molecular and Cell Biology (IBMC) and the National Institute of Biomedical Engineering (INEB).

Associated research institutes
Institute	Acronym
Centre for Astrophysics of the University of Porto	CAUP
Interdisciplinary Centre of Marine and Environmental Research	CIIMAR
Centre for Research in Higher Education Policies	CIPES
Institute for Research and Innovation in Health of the University of Porto	i3S
Institute of Sciences, Technologies and Agroenvironment of the University of Porto	ICETA
Institute of Science and Innovation in Mechanical and Industrial Engineering	INEGI
Institute for Systems and Computer Engineering, Technology and Science	INESC TEC
Institute of Public Health of the University of Porto	ISPUP
Instituto de Telecomunicações	IT
Chemistry and Technology Network	REQUIMTE
BIOPOLIS Association	BIOPOLIS

Between 2020 and 2024 the university's researchers published about 31,000 documents indexed in the Web of Science, 24% of the citable Portuguese documents in that database; 12% of them were among the 10% most cited and 58% resulted from international collaboration. By May 2026, according to the university, researchers of the university and of its associated institutes had obtained 26 grants from the European Research Council, many of them hosted by legally distinct entities such as the i3S, CIIMAR or INEGI. The 2025 update of the list "World's Top 2% Scientists", compiled by researchers at Stanford University and published by Elsevier, included 205 of the university's teachers and researchers, more than a fifth of the Portuguese scientists listed. The university works closely with Porto's two central hospitals: Santo António, where the ICBAS conducts its clinical teaching, and São João, where the Faculty of Medicine is based.

==== Scientific contributions ====
At the Polytechnic Academy, Francisco Gomes Teixeira wrote the Tratado de las curvas especiales notables (Treatise on Remarkable Special Curves), a catalogue of more than a hundred plane and space curves, awarded a prize by the Royal Academy of Exact, Physical and Natural Sciences of Madrid and published in 1905, with an enlarged French edition between 1908 and 1915. At the Faculty of Medicine, Abel Salazar, professor of histology, developed a tannin–iron staining method that brought him international recognition.

Research on familial amyloid polyneuropathy entered the university with the ICBAS. The disease had been described in 1952 by Corino de Andrade, from patients seen at the Santo António General Hospital; he then held no post at the university, which made him a full professor only in 1976, after he had taken part in founding the ICBAS. In 1984 Maria João Saraiva characterised, in the Portuguese form of the disease, the substitution of valine by methionine at position 30 of transthyretin, in a University of Porto doctorate carried out mostly at Columbia University; her group later developed mouse models in which a combination of doxycycline and tauroursodeoxycholic acid reduced transthyretin deposits, a combination then tested in patients in a phase II study in Pavia. At the Institute of Molecular Pathology and Immunology (Ipatimup), now part of the i3S, research on hereditary diffuse gastric cancer, associated with mutations in the E-cadherin gene (CDH1), showed in 2009 that large deletions of the gene occur in about 4% of affected families, and the institute's researchers co-authored the 2020 international clinical guidelines; in 2013 the institute described the frequency of mutations in the promoter of the TERT gene in several cancers, including thyroid cancer.

In other fields, teams at CIBIO led by Miguel Carneiro showed, with Uppsala University and the Broad Institute, that the domestication of the rabbit resulted mainly from changes in the frequency of variants in many genes (2014), and identified the gene CYP2J19, which allows birds to turn yellow carotenoids into red ones, a result obtained at the same time at the University of Cambridge (2016). At the Institute of Astrophysics and Space Sciences, a team led by João Faria announced in 2022, using the ESPRESSO spectrograph on the Very Large Telescope, the detection of Proxima Centauri d, a candidate planet of the star closest to the Sun, at the time the lightest planet measured by the radial-velocity method. The Underwater Systems and Technology Laboratory of the Faculty of Engineering developed light autonomous underwater vehicles, marketed since 2008 by the spin-off OceanScan-MST, and organises with the Portuguese Navy the annual REP(MUS) exercise for unmanned systems. In artificial intelligence, the simulated robot football team FC Portugal, a joint project of the universities of Porto and Aveiro, won the RoboCup simulation league world championship in 2000.

==== Innovation ====
The central building of UPTEC, the university's science and technology park, at Asprela, with the sculpture Loop, in 2019

At the end of 2025 the university had 742 active patent processes, 427 of them international, and counted 3,567 jobs created by the start-ups and spin-off companies linked to it. In 2024 it was the Portuguese university that filed the most applications with the European Patent Office, and in 2023 a ranking by Startup Portugal, based on Dealroom data, placed it first among Portuguese universities, with 275 start-up founders among its former students. Its science and technology park, UPTEC, has four centres, two at Asprela, one in the city centre and one in Leça da Palmeira; according to an impact study cited by the business news site ECO, it had a total impact of €324 million on Portugal's gross domestic product. Companies that emerged from the university include Veniam, whose Wi-Fi network on Porto's buses and taxis was described by the MIT Technology Review in 2014.

=== Libraries and museums ===
The Ferreira da Silva Laboratory in the Museum of Natural History and Science, in 2024

The university has 19 libraries, with more than 800,000 publications in their catalogue. (Note: The libraries page lists 19, including that of the Nursing School; the "Facts and Figures" page and the English version of the libraries page give 18, without it.) The library of old collections, in the Rectorate building, holds documents from the 16th to the 20th century inherited from the schools that preceded the university. The Casa dos Livros – Centre for the Study of Culture in Portugal, opened in 2022 and run by the Faculty of Arts and Humanities, keeps the libraries and archives of the writers Vasco Graça Moura, Eugénio de Andrade and Ana Luísa Amaral. The university's open repository held 61,600 items in 2022 and ranked first in Portugal in the Transparent Ranking of Repositories of the Spanish National Research Council. The Jornal de Sciencias Mathematicas e Astronomicas, founded in 1877 by Gomes Teixeira, was the first Portuguese periodical devoted exclusively to mathematics.

The university has twelve museum spaces. The largest, the Museum of Natural History and Science, formed in 2015 by merging two earlier museums, has its central unit in the Rectorate building, with collections of natural history, archaeology, ethnography and scientific instruments and the Ferreira da Silva Laboratory, opened in 1910 and restored in 2021; its second unit comprises the Botanical Garden and the Biodiversity Gallery. The Museum of the Faculty of Fine Arts, with works by students and teachers since 1836, holds a drawing that the art historian Philip Pouncey attributed to Leonardo da Vinci in 1965 and that the Louvre included in its 2019 exhibition devoted to the artist. The others include museums of the history of medicine and of anatomy, the museums of the faculties of Pharmacy and Engineering, the Abel Salazar House-Museum and the Porto Planetarium, opened in 1998 on the initiative of the astronomer Teresa Lago.

=== Reputation ===
University rankings

Global – Overall
- ARWU World: 301–400 (2026)
- QS World: =255 (2027)
- THE World: 401–450 (2027)
- USNWR Global: =247 (2023)

Positions in the latest editions of the main international rankings
Ranking	Edition	World	Europe	Ibero-America	Portugal
QS World University Rankings	2027	255th (tied)	104th	14th	2nd
Times Higher Education World University Rankings	2027	401st–450th	—	—	2nd–3rd
Academic Ranking of World Universities (Shanghai)	2026	301st–400th	107th–141st	7th–13th	1st–2nd
CWTS Leiden Ranking (publications among the 10% most cited) (Note: The CWTS Leiden Ranking does not produce an overall ranking; the positions shown result from ordering universities by their number of publications among the 10% most cited in the world in their fields, with fractional counting, for the period 2020–2023.)	2025	186th	45th	—	1st

In the QS World University Rankings, the university reached 274th place in the 2023 edition, published in June 2022, then the best position achieved by a Portuguese institution; in later editions it has been placed between 237th (2026) and 278th (2025), and it was the highest-ranked Portuguese institution in several editions. (Note: The university was the highest-ranked Portuguese institution in the QS World University Rankings in the editions from 2014 to 2019 and from 2022 to 2024.) In the 2025 CWTS Leiden Ranking it was the Portuguese institution with the most publications among the 10% most cited in their fields, and in the Nature Index, from June 2025 to May 2026, it ranked third in Portugal and first in the health sciences. In the 2026 subject rankings, QS placed it 69th in the world in pharmacy and pharmacology, and ShanghaiRanking 47th in marine and ocean engineering.

The university was evaluated in 2010 by the European University Association, whose panel noted its "great strength in research" and its "impressive engagement with the community of Porto", and by the Agency for Assessment and Accreditation of Higher Education (A3ES), which in 2023 accredited it without conditions for six years; the agency's external review panel described it as "a solid, very consolidated and prestigious institution, with a significant historical and cultural past". (Note: Translated from the Portuguese: «uma instituição sólida, muito consolidada e prestigiada, com um passado histórico e cultural significativo».)

== Student life ==
In 2024/25, excluding the Nursing School, the university had 35,815 students in degree programmes, 55% of them women: 15,859 in bachelor's, 5,667 in integrated master's, 9,753 in master's and 4,536 in doctoral programmes. The 5,171 foreign students in degree programmes were of 119 nationalities; most of those admitted through the special competition for international students between 2019 and 2024 came from Brazil, followed by Guinea-Bissau, Cape Verde, Angola and Macau. Together with a record 2,741 incoming exchange students in 2024/25, international students made up about 20% of the student body, according to the university. In 2025 the Social Services served 572,715 meals, and the university's ten halls of residence offered 1,073 beds.

The faculties' students' associations belong to the Federação Académica do Porto (Porto Academic Federation), which organises the freshers' welcome and the Queima das Fitas. Under the Estado Novo, the students' association of the Faculty of Medicine was never officially recognised, and the police closed its premises in 1971; in 1973 a student protest against the International Festival of University Choirs ended with 325 arrests.

=== Traditions ===
Students of the Faculty of Engineering in the Academic Parade of the 2025 Queima das Fitas

The Queima das Fitas ("Burning of the Ribbons"), held in early May, originated in the Festa da Pasta of the final-year medical students, first celebrated in 1920, and became a single celebration for all faculties in the 1940s. (Note: Notícias U.Porto dates the adoption of the name Queima das Fitas to 1943 in an article of 2020 and to 1944 in another of 2026; the Federação Académica do Porto dates it to 1945.) It was suspended from 1971, when its parade gave way to a student demonstration, and resumed in 1978. In the Academic Parade, final-year students march in top hats, with canes and with ribbons in the colour of their degree; for 2022 the organisers estimated about 400,000 people at the parade and 200,000 at the concert nights. According to the Faculty of Engineering, the black academic dress was worn only by men until 1937, and the University of Porto's women students were the first to adopt it. The university bans on its premises initiation practices (praxe) that offend students' dignity, and since 2019 a peer-mentoring programme has welcomed new students in all faculties.

=== Culture ===
The Casa Comum, opened in 2019 in the Rectorate building, runs a programme of cinema, exhibitions, music and talks open to the city. The oldest student group, the Orfeão Universitário do Porto, founded in 1912, brings together about 200 students in choirs, tunas, fado and folk groups and organises the International Festival of University Tunas. The Teatro Universitário do Porto, founded in 1948, is the oldest independent theatre group in the city, and the Coral de Letras da Universidade do Porto, founded in 1966, won fourteen prizes at international festivals. Student media include the newspaper JUP, founded in 1987, and the online newspaper JPN, published since 2004 by students of communication sciences.

== Sport ==
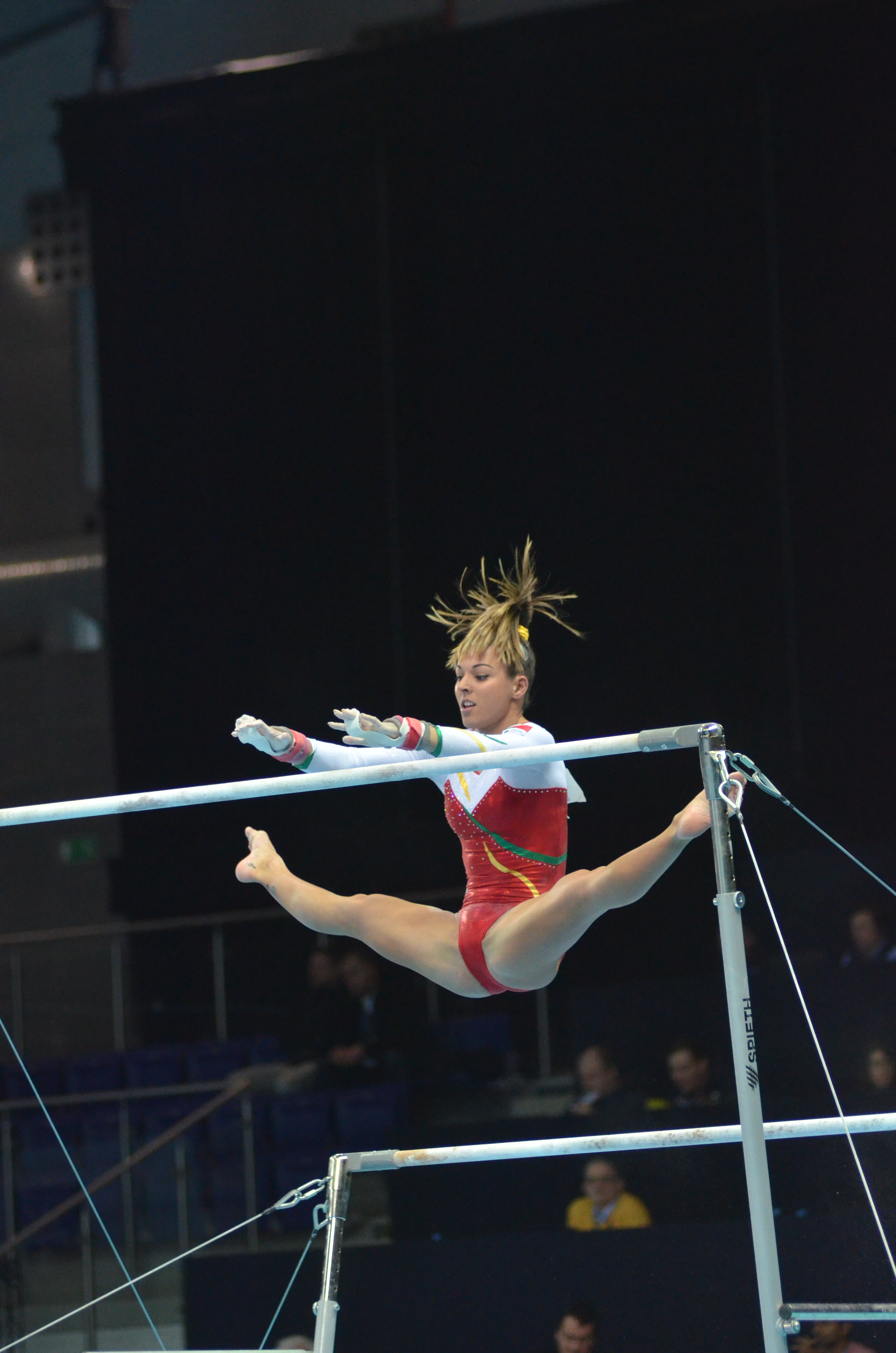
The gymnast Filipa Martins on the uneven bars at the 2019 European Artistic Gymnastics Championships in Szczecin

The University Stadium at Campo Alegre, opened in 1953, was the first university stadium in Portugal. University sport is run by the University of Porto Sports Centre (CDUP-UP), which manages the stadium and three other facilities. The university won the University Clubs Trophy of the Federação Académica do Desporto Universitário, awarded to the institution with the best results in the national university championships, in the 2022/23, 2023/24 and 2024/25 seasons and, according to the CDUP-UP, was again national university champion in 2025/26. (Note: The university's sources differ on the total number of wins of the trophy: in November 2024 the university referred to its 12th, in November 2025 to its 14th, and the CDUP-UP competition page attributes the 13th to the 2024/25 season.)

Students and former students of the university have competed at every Summer Olympics since 2008; at Paris 2024 the gymnast Filipa Martins, at her third Games, became the first Portuguese woman to reach an Olympic all-around final. At the Faculty of Sport, Vítor Frade devised tactical periodisation, a football training methodology that influenced coaches such as José Mourinho and André Villas-Boas, although a systematic review published in 2020 found no empirical studies evaluating it.

== Notable people ==
=== Alumni ===
The university counts as alumni both graduates and those who attended its programmes without completing them; its index of distinguished alumni lists 413 names. The first women to complete higher education in Porto were the sisters Laurinda, Aurélia and Guilhermina Moraes Sarmento, in medicine, and Rita Moraes Sarmento, in engineering, at the end of the 19th century.

Alumni in literature and thought include Camilo Castelo Branco, Júlio Dinis, Raul Brandão, Jaime Cortesão, Agostinho da Silva, Jorge de Sena, Rómulo de Carvalho, Ana Luísa Amaral and valter hugo mãe. In the arts and architecture they include António Soares dos Reis, Aurélia de Sousa, José Marques da Silva, Fernando Távora, Álvaro Siza, Eduardo Souto de Moura, Júlio Pomar, Nadir Afonso, Ângelo de Sousa, Graça Morais and the animation film director Regina Pessoa, awarded at the Annecy International Animation Film Festival in 2006 and 2019. In medicine and science they include Ricardo Jorge, Abel Salazar, the pathologists Manuel Sobrinho Simões and Fátima Carneiro, placed first in the Power List of the magazine The Pathologist in 2015 and 2018 respectively, the astronomer Teresa Lago and the physicist Maria Helena Braga. In engineering and business they include Edgar Cardoso, designer of the Arrábida Bridge; Virgínia Moura, one of the first women to study civil engineering in Portugal; Belmiro de Azevedo, of Sonae; Jorge Jardim Gonçalves, founder of Banco Comercial Português; and Luís Portela, chairman of Bial.

Former students have received the Pritzker Architecture Prize (Siza in 1992 and Souto de Moura in 2011), the Pessoa Prize (among them Souto de Moura, Sobrinho Simões and Maria Manuel Mota) and the Queen Sofía Prize for Ibero-American Poetry (Ana Luísa Amaral, 2021).

In public life, alumni include two presidents of Portugal, Manuel Teixeira Gomes and Francisco da Costa Gomes; heads of government of Portugal (António Teixeira de Sousa, 1910), Mozambique (Alberto Vaquina) and São Tomé and Príncipe (Jorge Bom Jesus); the President of the Assembly of the Republic Augusto Santos Silva; the European Commissioner Elisa Ferreira; the Governor of the Bank of Portugal Carlos Costa; the executive director of the United Nations Office for Project Services, Jorge Moreira da Silva; and at least 31 ministers in Portuguese governments. (Note: The count is a minimum, based on cases confirmed by independent sources and following the university's criterion, which includes those who attended programmes without completing them. Constitutional monarchy: António Teixeira de Sousa. First Republic and Military Dictatorship: Francisco Xavier Esteves, Alfredo de Magalhães, António Joaquim de Sousa Júnior, Augusto Nobre, Leonardo Coimbra, Ezequiel de Campos, João Carrington da Costa and Eduardo Santos Silva. Estado Novo: Manuel Gomes de Araújo, Daniel Barbosa and José do Canto Moniz. Since 1974: Luís Valente de Oliveira, João Lopes Porto, Eurico de Melo, Miguel Cadilhe, José Silva Peneda, Arlindo Cunha, Paulo Mendo, Daniel Bessa, Elisa Ferreira, Augusto Santos Silva, Joaquim Pina Moura, Luís Braga da Cruz, Carlos Tavares, Fernando Teixeira dos Santos, Jorge Moreira da Silva, João Pedro Matos Fernandes, Fernando Medina, Manuel Pizarro and Marina Gonçalves.)

=== Faculty ===
Teachers who marked the history of the university include the mathematician Francisco Gomes Teixeira, its first rector; the chemist António Joaquim Ferreira da Silva, a pioneer of forensic toxicology in Portugal; the physician, scientist and artist Abel Salazar; the philosopher Leonardo Coimbra; the mathematician Ruy Luís Gomes; the physicians Corino de Andrade and Nuno Grande, founders of the ICBAS, and the immunologist Maria de Sousa; the literary historian Óscar Lopes; and the architect Carlos Ramos.

=== Honorary doctorates ===
The university has awarded more than a hundred honorary doctorates. Those honoured include six Nobel laureates – Paul Sabatier (1923), James M. Buchanan (1995), Carlos Filipe Ximenes Belo and José Ramos-Horta (2000), Sydney Brenner (2003) and Anne L'Huillier (2024) – as well as the film director Manoel de Oliveira, the writers Agustina Bessa-Luís, Eugénio de Andrade and Margaret Atwood, the architectural historian Kenneth Frampton, the presidents Mário Soares, Jorge Sampaio, Fernando Henrique Cardoso and Sergio Mattarella, and the Olympic marathon champion Rosa Mota.

== See also ==
- List of modern universities in Europe (1801–1945)
- List of universities in Portugal
- Higher education in Portugal
