= Ana Luísa Amaral =

Portuguese poet and academic (1956–2022)

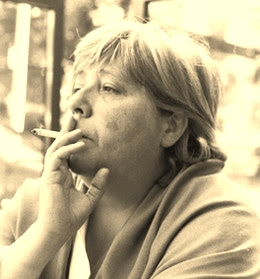
Ana Luísa Amaral

Ana Luísa Amaral (5 April 1956 – 5 August 2022) was a Portuguese poet.

== Biography ==
Professor at the University of Porto, she held a Ph.D. on the poetry of Emily Dickinson and had academic publications (in Portugal and abroad) in the areas of English and American poetry, comparative poetics, and feminist studies. She was a senior researcher and co-director of the Institute for Comparative Literature Margarida Losa. Co-author (with Ana Gabriela Macedo) of the Dictionary of Feminist Criticism (Afrontamento, 2005) and responsible for the annotated edition of New Portuguese Letters (Dom Quixote, 2010) and the coordinator of the international project New Portuguese Letters 40 Years Later, financed by FCT, that involves 10 countries and over 60 researchers. Editor of several academic books, such as Novas Cartas Portuguesas entre Portugal e o Mundo (with Marinela Freitas, Dom Quixote, 2014), or New Portuguese Letters to the World (with Marinela Freitas, Peter Lang, 2015).

Prior to her death, she was preparing a book of poetry, a novel, and two books of essays. In 2021, a book of essays on her work by Peter Lang (ed. Claire Williams) titled The Most Perfect Excess: The Works of Ana Luísa Amaral was published.

Several plays were staged around her work, such as O olhar diagonal das coisas, A história da Aranha Leopoldina, Próspero Morreu, or Como Tu. On April 1, 2022, she was awarded the rank of Commander of the Military Order of Sant'Iago da Espada. The insignia was only awarded on August 6, 2022, posthumously, to Ana Luísa Amaral's daughter.

She died on August 5, 2022, at the age of 66.

== Literary career ==
Amaral's first volume of poetry, Minha Senhora de Quê (Mistress of What), was published in 1990. The collection's title alluded to Maria Teresa Horta's 1971 volume Minha Senhora de Mim (Milady of Me), thereby explicitly inscribing Amaral's work into the emergent genealogy of Portuguese women’s poetry. Since then, she has published fifteen further original collections of poetry and two volumes of collected poems, in addition to several translations (including poetry by Emily Dickinson, John Updike and Louise Glück) and books for children.

Amaral's poetry has been translated into several languages and volumes of her writings have been published in the United States of America, United Kingdom, Germany, Spain, France, Brazil, Italy, Sweden, Holland, Venezuela, Colombia, Hong Kong, Mexico and Slovenia. She is also represented in many Portuguese and international anthologies. Her work has been awarded several distinctions such as the Gold Medal of Câmara Municipal de Matosinhos and the Gold Medal of Câmara Municipal do Porto, for "services to literature", or the Medaille de la Ville de Paris, and several literary prizes, such as the Correntes d’Escritas Literary Prize, o Premio di Poesia Giuseppe Acerbi, o Great Prize for Poetry of the Portuguese Writers' Association, the António Gedeão Prize, the Internazionale Fondazione Roma, Ritratti di Poesia Prize, o PEN Prize for Fiction, Prize for Essay from the Portuguese Association of Literary Critics, the Premio Leteo (Spain), Best Poetry Book of the Year from the Grémio de Librerias de Madrid, Vergílio Ferreira Prize, Sá de Miranda Literary Prize or the Premio Reina Sofía de Poesía Iberoamericana.

== Books ==
=== Poetry ===
- Minha senhora de quê, Fora do Texto, 1990; re., Quetzal, 1999
- Coisas de partir, Fora do Texto, 1993; re., Gótica, 2001
- Epopeias, Fora do Texto, 1994
- E muitos os caminhos, Poetas de Letras, 1995
- Às vezes o paraíso, Quetzal, 1998; re. 2000.
- Imagens, Campo das Letras, 2000
- Imagias, Gótica, 2002
- A arte de ser tigre, Gótica, 2003
- Poesia Reunida 1990–2005, Quasi, 2005
- A génese do amor, Campo das Letras, 2005; 2nd edition, 2006
- Entre dois rios e outras noites, Campo das Letras, 2008
- Se fosse um intervalo, Dom Quixote, 2009
- Inversos, Poesia 1990–2010, Dom Quixote, 2010
- Vozes, Dom Quixote, 2011; 2nd edition 2012; 3rd edition 2015
- Escuro, Assírio & Alvim, 2014
- E Todavia, Assírio & Alvim, 2015
- What's in a name, Assírio & Alvim, 2017
- Ágora, Assírio & Alvim, 2019
- Mundo, Assírio & Alvim, 2021 (forthcoming)

=== Essay ===
- Arder a palavra e outros incêndios, Relógio D'Água, 2018

=== Theater ===
- Próspero Morreu, Caminho, 2011

=== Fiction ===
- Ara, Sextante, 2013

=== Children's books ===
- Gaspar, o Dedo Diferente e Outras Histórias, (illust. Elsa Navarro), Campo das Letras, 1999
- A História da Aranha Leopoldina, (illust. Elsa Navarro), Campo das Letras, 2000
- A Relíquia, based on the novel by Eça de Queirós, Quasi, 2008
- Auto de Mofina Mendes, based on the play by Gil Vicente, Quasi, 2008
- A História da Aranha Leopoldina, (illust. Raquel Pinheiro), Civilização, 2010 (reviewed edition, with CD. Music by Clara Ghimel, and Nuno Aragão, sung by Rosa Quiroga, Nuno Aragão and Sissa Afonso)
- Gaspar, o Dedo Diferente, (illust. Abigail Ascenso), Civilização, 2011 (reviewed edition)
- A Tempestade, (illust. Marta Madureira), Quidnovi 2011 – Selected for the Portuguese National Reading Plan
- Como Tu, (illust. Elsa Navarro), Quidnovi, 2012 (With CD – audiobook and songs, music of Antonio Pinho Vargas, piano by Álvaro Teixeira Lopes, voices of Pedro Lamares, Rute Pimenta and Ana Luísa Amaral – Selected for the Portuguese National Reading Plan
- Lengalenga de Lena, a Hiena, (illust. Jaime Ferraz), Zero a Oito, 2019
- A História da Aranha Leopoldina, (illust. Jaime Ferraz), Zero a Oito, 2019
- Gaspar, o Dedo Diferente, (illust. Chico Bolila), Zero a Oito, 2019
- Como Tu, (illust. Alberto Faria), Zero a Oito, 2020

=== Translations ===
- Xanana Gusmão, Mar Meu/My Sea of Timor, co-transl. with Kristy Sword (Granito, 1998)
- Eunice de Souza, Poemas Escolhidos (Cotovia, 2001)
- John Updike, Ponto Último e Outros Poemas (Civilização, 2009)
- Emily Dickinson, Cem Poemas (Relógio D'Água, 2010)
- Emily Dickinson, Duzentos Poemas (Relógio d’Água, 2015)
- Patricia Highsmith, Carol (Relógio d'Água, 2015)
- William Shakespeare, 30 Sonetos (Relógio d'Água, 2015)
- Mário de Sá-Carneiro, Seven Songs of Decline and Other Poems, co-trad. Margaret Jull Costa, ed. Ricardo Vasconcelos (Francis Boutle Publishers, 2020)
- Louise Glück, A Íris Selvagem (Relógio d'Água, 2020)
- Arnold Wesker, Primavera Selvagem (Edições Humus, 2020)
- Louise Glück, Vita Nova (Relógio d'Água, 2021)
- Emily Dickinson, Herbarium (Relógio d'Água, forthcoming)
- Margaret Atwood, Políticas de Poder (Relógio d'Água, forthcoming)

=== Ana Luísa Amaral’s books published in other countries ===
==== United States ====
- The Art of Being a Tiger. Selected Poems, trans. Margaret Jull Costa, Tagus Press, 2018
- What's in a name?, trans. Margaret Jull Costa, New Directions, 2019

==== Brazil ====
- A gênese do amor, Gryphus, Rio de Janeiro, 2008
- Vozes, Iluminuras, São Paulo, 2013
- Escuro, Iluminuras, São Paulo, 2015
- Ara, Iluminuras, São Paulo, 2016
- Luzes, Iluminuras, São Paulo, 2021 (forthcoming)

==== Colombia ====
- Entre otras noches, Antologia Poética, trans. Lauren Mendinueta, Taller de Edición-Rocca, Bogotá, 2013
- Como Tu, trans. Lauren Mendinueta, Taller de Edición-Rocca, Bogotá, 2014
- Qué Hay en un Nombre, trad. Pedro Rapoula, Puro Pássaro, Bogotá, 2020

==== France ====
- Images, trans. Catherine Dumas, Vallongues Éditions, 2000
- Comme Toi, trans. Catherine Dumas, Editions Theatrales, Paris, 2013
- L’Art d’être tigre, trans. Catherine Dumas, Phare du Cousseixo, 2015

Germany

- Was ist ein Name, trad. Michael Kegler & Piero Salabe, Hanser Verlag, Munchen, 2021

==== Hong Kong ====
- Nude: a Study in Poignancy, The Chinese University of Hong Kong Press, Hong Kong, 2019

==== Italy ====
- Poesie, trans. Livia Apa, Poesie, XVª Edizione – Portogallo, Lisbona, Instituto Camões, 2008
- La Genesi dell’Amore, trans. Piero Ceccucci, Fiorenza mia…!:, Florence, Firenze University Press, 2009
- La Scala di Giacobbe: Poesia di Ana Luísa Amaral, trans. Livia Apa, Manni Editori, Milan, 2010
- Voci, trans. Chiara De Luca, Kolibris, 2018
- What's in a Name e altri versi, trans. Livia Apa, Crocetti Editore, Milano, 2019

==== Mexico ====
- Oscuro, Universidad Autónoma de Nuevo Léon, trans. Blanca Luz Pulido, 2017

==== The Netherlands ====
- Wachten op Odysseus: Gedichten 1990–2011, trans. Arie Pos, uitgeverij IJZER, 2011

Slovenia

- What’s in a Name, trans. Barbara Juršič, Beletrina, Lubiana, 2021

==== Spain ====
- Oscuro, trans. Luis Maria Marina, Olifante, 2015
- What's in a Name, trans. Paula Abramo, Sexto Piso, Madrid, 2020
- Mundo, trans. Paula Abramo, Sexto Piso, Madrid, 2021 (forthcoming)

==== Sweden ====
- Mellan tva floder och andra natter, trans. Ulla Gabrielson, Diadorim, Gothenburg, 2009
- Mitt Klärobskyra, En Antologi Poesi av Ana Luísa Amaral, trans. Ulla Gabrielson, Diadorim, Gotemburgo, 2021 (forthcoming)

==== Venezuela ====
- Ana Luisa Amaral, Antología Poética, trans. Nidia Hernandez, Monte Ávila Editores, Caracas, 2012

== Prizes and awards ==
- Literary Prize Casino da Póvoa/Correntes d’Escritas, with the book A génese do amor (2007)
- Premio Letterario Giuseppe Acerbi, Mantua Italy, with the book A génese do amor (2008)
- Great Prize of Poetry of Associação Portuguesa de Escritores, with the book Entre Dois Rios e Outras Noites (2008)
- Finalist for the Prize Portugal Telecom (with A génese do amor, Gryphus, 2008)
- Prize Rómulo de Carvalho/António Gedeão, 1st edition, with the book Vozes (2012)
- Proposed to the Prize Reina Sofia (2013)
- Prize of Novel of Associação Portuguesa de Escritores, with the book Ara (2014)
- Finalist for the Prize Portugal Telecom (with Vozes, Iluminuras, 2014)
- Gold Medal of Câmara Municipal de Matosinhos, for services to literature (2015)
- Gold Medal of Câmara Municipal do Porto (2016)
- Premio Internazionale Fondazione Roma: Ritratti di Poesia (2018)
- Prize for Essay Jacinto do Prado Coelho, from the Portuguese Association of Literary Critics (2018), with the book Arder a palavra e outros incêndios (2018)
- Guerra Junqueiro Literary Prize (2020)
- Best Poetry Book of the Year from the Grémio de Librerias de Madrid, with the book What's in a Name (2020)
- Leteo Prize (2020)
- Francisco Sá de Miranda Literary Prize, with the book Ágora (2021)
- Virgílio Ferreira Prize (2021)
- XXX Premio Rainha Sofia de Poesia Ibero-americana (2021).
