= Maria de Sousa =

Portuguese scientist, immunologist, author, and poet (1939–2020)

Maria de Sousa GCSE GOSE GOIH
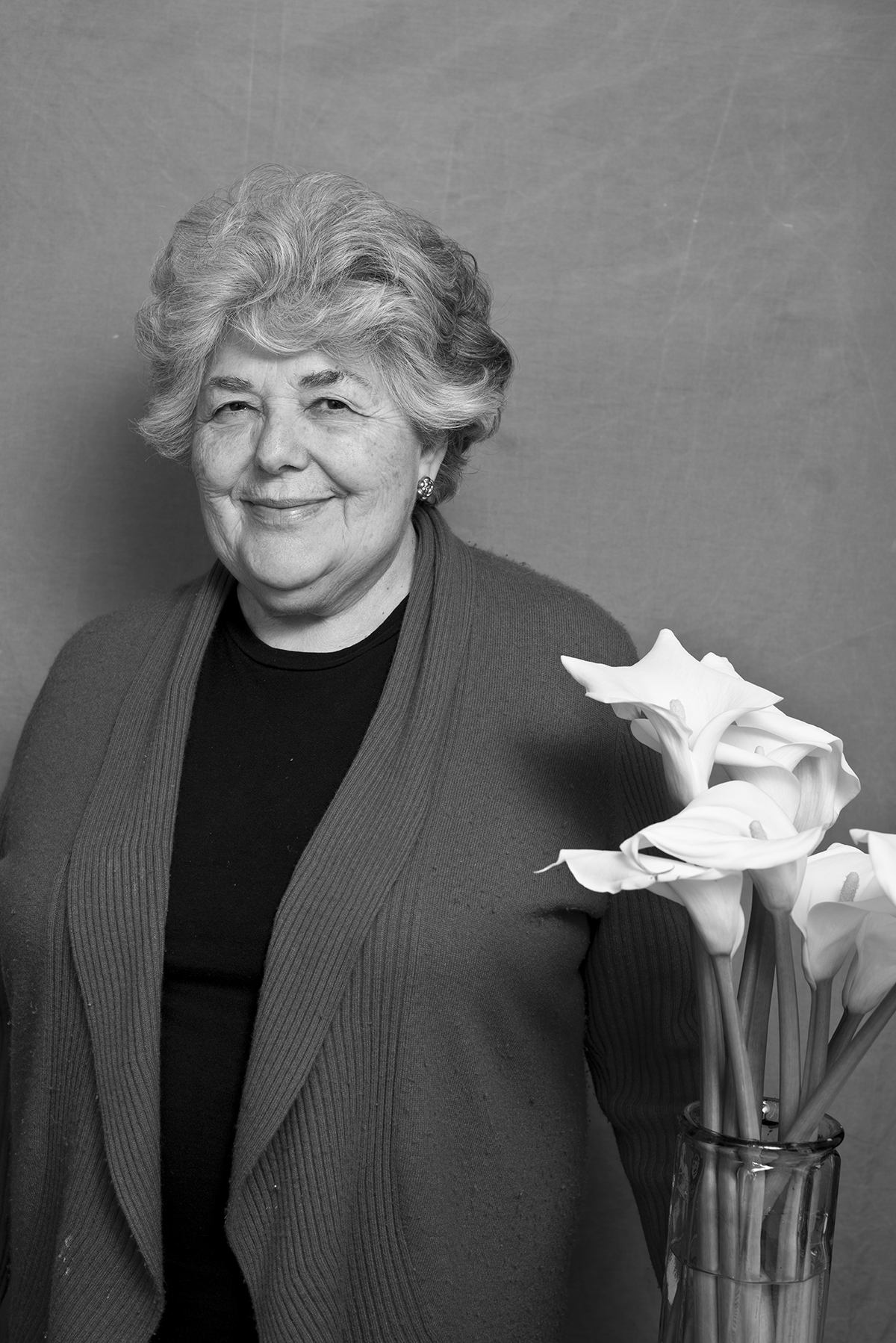
- Born: Maria Ângela Brito de Sousa; 17 October 1939; Lisbon, Portugal
- Died: 14 April 2020 (aged 80); Arroios, Lisbon, Portugal
- Occupation: Immunologist

Maria Ângela Brito de Sousa GCSE GOSE GOIH (17 October 1939 – 14 April 2020) was a Portuguese immunologist, science leader, poet and writer. She gained international recognition as a medical researcher, as the author of several seminal scientific papers. She was the first to describe thymus-dependent (or T cell) areas in 1966, a fundamental discovery in the mapping of peripheral lymphoid organs; she coined the term "ecotaxis" in 1971, to describe the phenomenon of cells of different origins migrating and organizing among themselves in very specific lymphoid areas. In the 1980s she focused on the study of hereditary hemochromatosis, an iron overload genetic disease.

== Early life and education ==
Maria de Sousa was born in Lisbon in 1939. Her father was a naval officer and her mother a homemaker.

She graduated from medical school at the University of Lisbon in 1963. In 1964, she moved to London to work at the then Imperial Cancer Research Fund's Experimental Biology Laboratories.

== Career ==
She won a Gulbenkian Foundation scholarship and from 1964 to 1966 worked with Delphine Parrott studying mice who had their thymus removed. In 1966, she moved to the University of Glasgow to undertake a PhD. In her study by light microscopy, she observed that lymphocytes from the thymus, the so-called T-cells, move to other lymphatic organs by a process which she termed ecotaxis.

In 1975 went to NYC where she was an adjunct professor at what was then Cornell Medical College and became head of the cell ecology lab at Memorial Sloan Kettering Cancer Center. An interest in the non-immunological functions of lymphocytes, such as iron metabolism, led her to study hemochromatosis, which is common in northern Portugal.

In 1984, she returned to Portugal, as Professor of Immunology at the medical school of the Instituto Abel Salazar, University of Porto. She established a Masters Program in Immunology and over the next 10 years she helped forge two Ph.D. programs, one of them funded by the Calouste Gulbenkian Foundation and in 1996, the Graduate Program in Basic and Applied Biology (GABBA).

In October 2009, she retired from the University of Porto.

== Personal life and death ==
Sousa "was fond of art", she was a pianist and poet. She died in Lisbon on 14 April 2020, leaving no immediate survivors. She was a victim of COVID-19 during the COVID-19 pandemic in Portugal, after a week in the intensive care unit of São José Hospital.

Among the many top figures in Portuguese science and society that paid homage to Sousa, the President of the Republic, Marcelo Rebelo de Sousa, issued a statement offering his condolences to the family, referring to her as a "unmatched figure in Portuguese science" and underscoring her "inescapable legacy in science and great example in rigor, exigence, and civic and cultural commitment".

== Distinctions ==
=== National orders ===
- Grand Officer of the Order of Prince Henry (9 June 1995)
- Grand Officer of the Order of Saint James of the Sword (20 January 2012)
- Grand Cross of the Order of Saint James of the Sword (18 November 2016)

== Selected publications ==
- Parrott, DMV, de Sousa, MAB, and East, J. "Thymus-dependent areas in the lymphoid organs of neonatally thymectomized mice". Journal of Experimental Medicine; 123: 191–1966.
- Parrott, DMV and De Sousa, MAB. "Changes in thymus-dependent areas of lymph nodes after immunological stimulation". Nature, 212: 1316-,1966.
- De Sousa, MAB, Parrott, DMV and Pantelouris. "Lymphoid tissues in mice with congenital aplasia of the thymus". Clinical and Experimental Immunology 4: 637-,1969.
- Sousa, MD "Kinetics of distribution of thymus and marrow cells in peripheral organs of the mouse – Ecotaxis". Clinical and Experimental Immunology 9: 371-,1971.
- Broxmeyer, HE, Smithyman, A, Eger, RR, Meyer, PA and De Sousa, M. "Identification of Lactoferrin as granulocyte derived inhibitor of colony stimulating activity production". Journal of Experimental Medicine 148: 1052–1067, 1977.
- Dörner, M., Silverstone, A., Nishyia, K., de Sostoa, A., Munn, G and De Sousa, M. "Ferritin synthesis by Human T lymphocytes". Science, 209: 1019–1021.
- De Sousa M., Reimão, R., Lacerda, R., Hugo, P. and Kaufman. S. "Iron overload in β2 microglobulin deficient mice". Immunology Letters 39: 105–111. 1994.
- Santos, M., Schilham, MW, Rademakers, LHPM, Marx, JJM, de Sousa, M. and Clevers, H. "Defective iron homeostasis in beta 2-microglobulin knockout mice recapitulates Hereditary Hemochromatosis in man". Journal of Experimental Medicine 184: 1975–1985. 1996.
- De Almeida SF, Carvalho IF, Cardoso CS, Cordeiro JV, Azevedo JE, Neefjes J, De Sousa M. (2005) "HFE crosstalks with the MHC class I antigen presentation pathway". Blood 106:971-7.
- De Sousa, M. 2011. "An outsider's perspective-ecotaxis revisited: an integrative review of cancer environment, iron and immune system cells". Integrative Biology, 3, 343–349.
- Hoshino A, Costa-Silva B, Shen TL, et al. (2015). "Tumour exosome integrins determine organotropic metastasis". Nature 527(7578):329-35. Epub 2015 Oct 28.
