= Orfeão Universitário do Porto =

Portuguese nonprofit organization

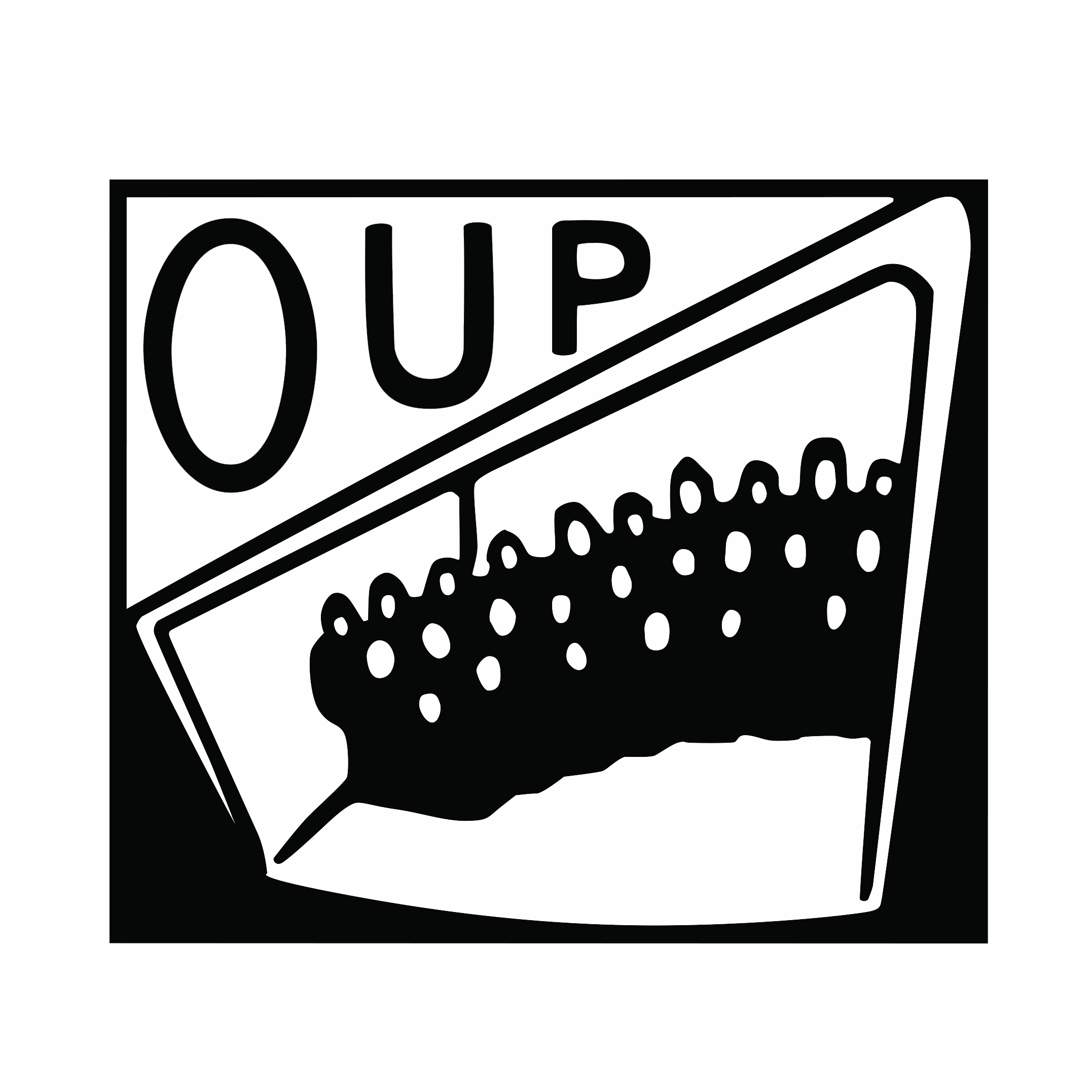
- Founded: March 6, 1912; 114 years ago
- Purpose: Classical Choir; Portuguese Folk Music and Dance; Academic Traditions
- Location: Porto, Portugal, EU
- Services: Students Association
- Members: 150
- Affiliations: University of Porto
- Website: orfeao.up.pt

Orfeão Universitário do Porto (OUP) ComM • ComIP is a Portuguese student Association linked to the University of Porto dedicated to choir singing and Portuguese culture (mainly folk music and dance, and academic traditions). Originally founded on March 6, 1912 under the name of Orfeon Académico do Porto, following the French mouvement des orphéons, it is one of the few associations that gather students from all the Faculties of the University of Porto. It has undergone reorganizations in 1937 and in 1942, from where its current designation still lasts until today.

Throughout its long history, Orfeão has become nationally known for the 1937 song "Amores de Estudante" (composed by its members Paulo Pombo and Aureliano da Fonseca), considered to be the Porto and portuguese students anthem. Orfeão was also the first academic choral group to accept women in its ranks in 1945, eventually developing the standard academic uniform that Portuguese women students still wear today. Being home to the second oldest Portuguese Tuna in activity, the Tuna Universitária do Porto (with its origins being traced to the last decade of the 19th century), in 1987 Orfeão organized the first Tunas Festival in Portugal - FITU (International Festival of University Tunas - City of Porto") - and in 1988 creates the first feminine academic tuna in Portugal.

Currently representing twelve different artistic groups, Orfeão Universitário do Porto has a diverse artistic representation of the Portuguese cultural tradition, with the relevance of its work being recognized by the City of Porto with the Golden Medal of Artistic Merit and by the Portuguese Republic with the award of the grade of Commander of the Order of Public Instruction and Commander of the Order of Merit.

Today, Orfeão is directed by the Maestro António Sérgio Ferreira and derives much of its fame from its regular national television appearances and intense artistic activity at home and abroad. Currently OUP is recognized as a cultural extension of the University of Porto by its Rectorate and as a Public Utility Entity by the Portuguese State.

== Artistic variety ==
Being initially founded as a choir, Orfeão gradually developed itself as being artistically heterogeneous, currently being able to present in its performances a classical choir, a popular (folk) choir, folk dances from Madeira and Açores, folk dances from Douro and Minho, Coimbra fado, Lisbon Fado, Pauliteiros de Miranda, Pauliteiras de Miranda, Cante Alentejano, Maçadeiras singing (folk from Beiras), masculine Tuna and feminine Tuna.

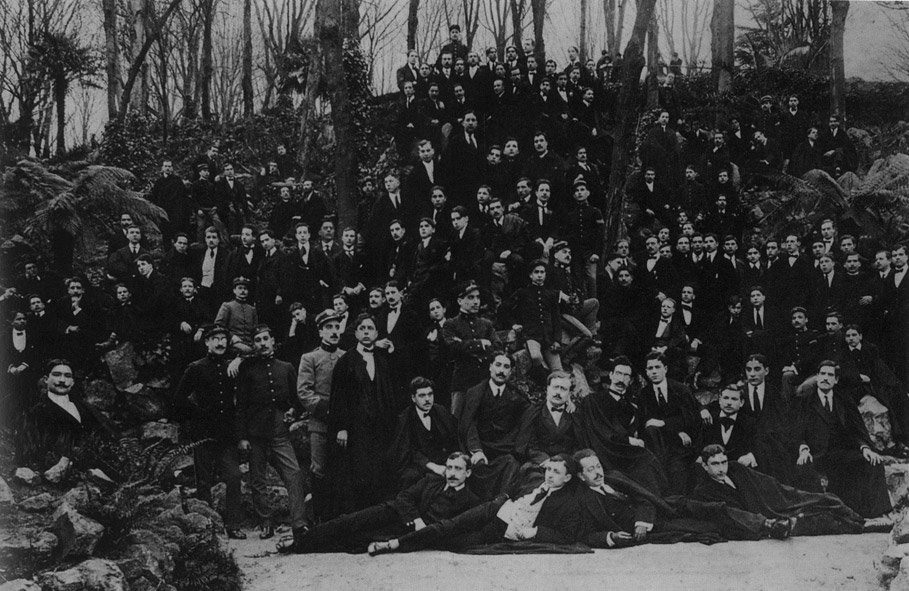
The Orpheón Académico do Porto in 1912

== Performing and recording activities ==
The group maintains a strong recording and touring schedule, in addition to its regular activities in the city of Porto.

=== Tours and performances ===
The choir first toured in 1913, visiting Spain. Throughout its history, the group has toured throughout Africa (Angola, Mozambique, South Africa, Cape Verde, Libya, Tunisia, Morocco and Namibia), South America (Brazil, Venezuela and Argentina), North America (the U.S. and Mexico), Europe (Portugal, Spain, France, U.K., Luxembourg, Italy, Switzerland, Germany, Poland and Greece) and Asia (Turkey, India, China, Macau, Malaysia and Thailand).

The group regularly performs in Portugal, giving concerts in major concert halls, as well as at numerous festivals around the country. The group also performs an annual Christmas choir concert, Spring concert and Tunas Festival.

=== Recordings ===
The group's first commercial release was a recording of its Tango Orchestra on the ORFEU label, released in 1960. In 1964 the group released a landmark recording of the 1937 theme "Amores de Estudante" by its Tuna, that greatly contributed to its popular success.

Orfeão has recorded 17 albums, on the ORFEU and its own labels. The group has been innovative in its release of recordings, as apart from standard EPs, LPs, CDs and Cassettes they have released new and old recordings online on platforms such as Spotify, Apple Music, YouTube or Deezer through the distributor RouteNote.

Recordings on the group's own label, Orfeão Universitário do Porto, include:

- 2017 - Tradição viva, ao vivo. (Coimbra Fado live performance)
- 2005 - Cinco Séculos de Polifonia (Choir)
- 2002 - Des(a)fiar o Tempo (Maçadeiras singing)
- 2001 - Concerto de Apresentação Queima das Fitas 2000 (men's Tuna live performance)
- 1997 - FITU uma década uma história (tunas live performance)
- 1996 - Um Percurso (men's Tuna live performance)
- 1995 - Academia (jazz orchestra, Coimbra Fado, men's Tuna and women's Tuna)
- 1994 - VII FITU "Cidade do Porto" (tunas live performance)
- 1993 - Fado Académico (Coimbra Fado)
- 1991 - Acordes, Harpejos... ...Tainadas e Beijos (men's Tuna)

Recordings under the ORFEU label include:

- 1975 - Amores de Estudante (men's Tuna and Mornas compilation)
- 1972 - Sarau Comemorativo do 60º aniversário 71/2 (choir, folk music, Coimbra fado and men's tuna live performance)
- 1966 - Orquestra de Tangos do Orfeão Universitário do Porto (3rd EP, tango orchestra)
- 1966 - Tuna do Orfeão Universitário do Porto (2nd EP, men's tuna)
- 1964 - Mornas de Cabo Verde (EP, Mornas Group)
- 1964 - Orquestra de Tangos do Orfeão Universitário do Porto (2nd EP, tango orchestra)
- 1964 - Tuna do Orfeão Universitário do Porto (EP, men's tuna)
- 1960 - Orquestra de Tangos do Orfeão Universitário do Porto (EP, tango orchestra)

== Artistic Directors ==
The group is conducted by the Artistic Director. Until 1937, Orfeão had as its Artistic Directors Fernando Moutinho, Futuro Barroso, Father Clemente Ramos, João Antunes and again Futuro Barroso. From 1937 to 1967, its Artistic Director was renowned Portuguese Maestro Afonso Valentim. Then came Maestro Gunther Arglebe from 1967 to 1969, Professor Fernando Jorge Azevedo between 1969 and 1973 and then Professor and Maestro Mário Mateus from 1973 to 2005. The current Artistic Director is the Maestro António Sérgio Ferreira.
