= INESC TEC =

Portuguese research center

Coordinates: 41°10′46″N 8°35′43″W

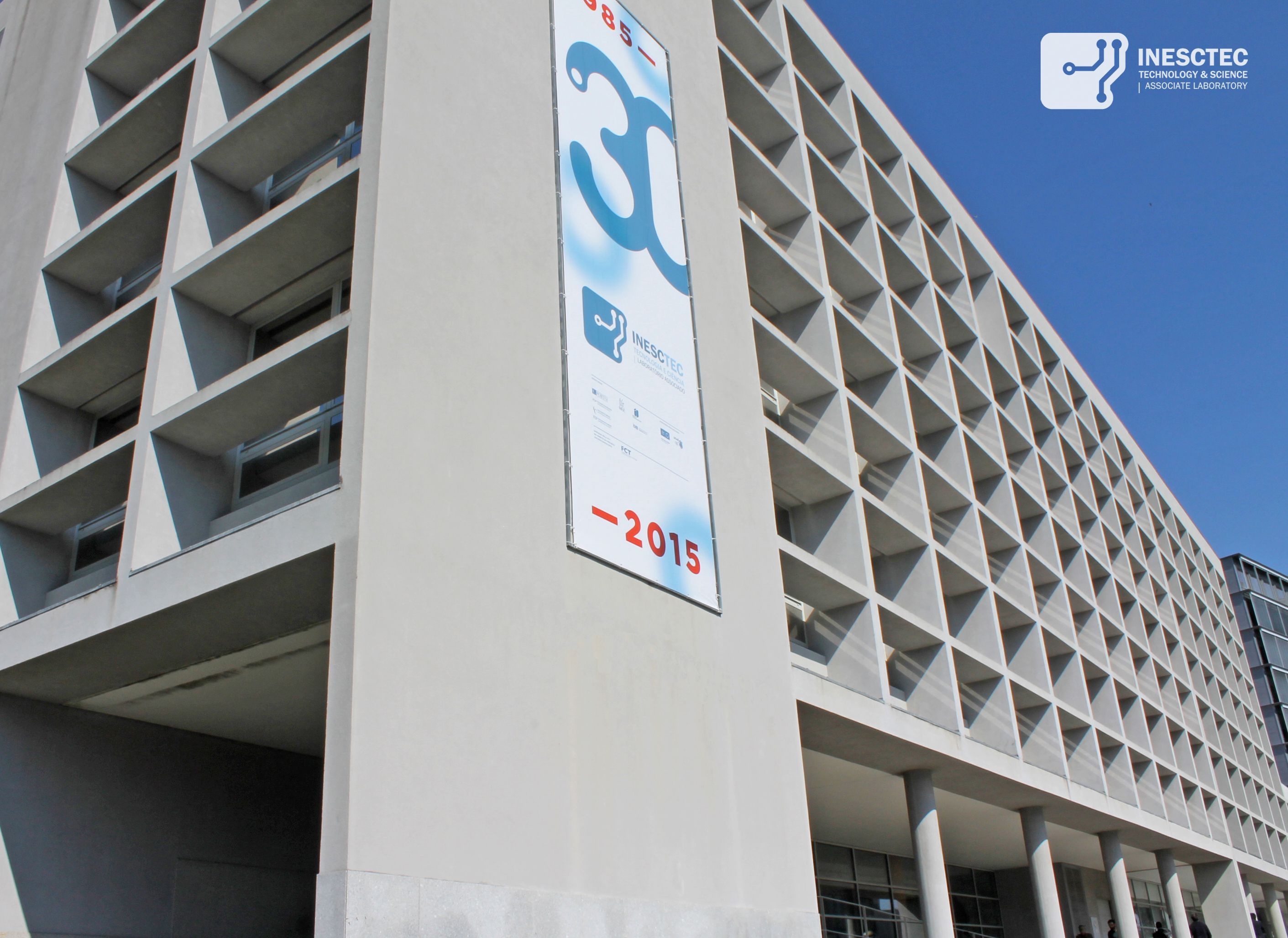
INESC TEC

The Institute for Systems and Computer Engineering, Technology and Science (INESC TEC) is a research & development institute at the Faculty of Engineering of the University of Porto in Portugal. Present in 6 sites in the cities of Porto, Braga and Vila Real, INESC TEC incorporates 13 R&D Centres and one Associate Unit with complementary competences, always looking to the international market. INESC TEC brings together more than 700 researchers, of which around 350 have PhDs.

INESC TEC is a private non-profit association, recognised as a Public Interest Institution and has been an Associate Laboratory since 2002. The purpose of INESC TEC is to act as an interface between the academic world, the world of industry and services and the public administration in Information Technologies, Telecommunications and Electronics (ITT&E). INESC TEC invests in Scientific Research and Technological Development, as well as in Advanced Training and Consulting, Technology Transfer and supports the Establishment of new Technology-based Companies.

== History ==
INESC was founded in the city of Porto in 1985, and in December 1998 it became INESC Porto, a branch of INESC. Following a rebranding process, the institution changed its name to INESC TEC, with INESC, the University of Porto Foundation and the Polytechnic Institute of Porto.

In 2012, INESC TEC signed a protocol with the University of Minho. INESC TEC's complex in Minho is called HASLab – High Assurance Software Laboratory. In 2012, the University of Trás-os-Montes e Alto Douro (UTAD) also became a privileged partner of INESC TEC.

With the launching of INESC P&D Brasil (in São Paulo, Brazil), INESC TEC has strengthened its presence worldwide, always associating Portugal to international scientific excellence.

== Research areas ==
TriMares

INESC TEC is one of Portugal's most influential research institutes with developments in areas such as health, renewable energies, enterprise systems, artificial intelligence, robotics, applied photonics, information systems and high-assurance software.

In 2011, the Portuguese Navy joined efforts with the institute to develop technology for deep sea research and surveillance in order to monitor Portugal's Exclusive Economic Zone.

Among the people who work at INESC TEC are some of the most influential researchers both in Portugal and worldwide, such as José Carlos Príncipe, who won the 2011 IEEE Neural Networks Pioneer Award. In 2013, Vladimiro Miranda was awarded with the IEEE Power & Energy Society Ramakumar Family Renewable Energy Excellence Award 2012 by the prestigious Institute of Electrical and Electronics Engineers.

In December 2012, INESC TEC revealed the Laboratory of Smart Grids and Electric Vehicles, which was the result of project REIVE (Smart Grids with Electric Vehicles), making it possible to test, in a realistic environment, new solutions that integrate microgeneration units and electric vehicles in Low Voltage grids.

INESC TEC conducts research in the following clusters:

- Power and Energy
- Computer Science
- Industry and Innovation
- Networked Intelligent Systems

== Organisation ==
The institute consists of:

Laboratory of Smart Grids and Electric Vehicles

13 R&D Centres

- CPES – Centre for Power and Energy Systems
- CTM – Centre for Telecommunications and Multimedia
- CAP – Centre for Applied Photonics
- CESE – Centre for Enterprise Systems Engineering
- CSIG – Centre for Information Systems and Computer Graphics
- CRIIS – Centre for Robotics in Industry and Intelligent Systems
- CRAS - Centre for Robotics and Autonomous Systems
- CITE – Centre for Innovation, Technology and Entrepreneurship
- C-BER - Centre for Biomedical Engineering Research
- LIAAD – Laboratory of Artificial Intelligence and Decision Support
- CRACS – Centre for Research in Advanced Computing Systems
- CEGI – Centre for Industrial Engineering and Management
- HASLab – High-Assurance Software Laboratory

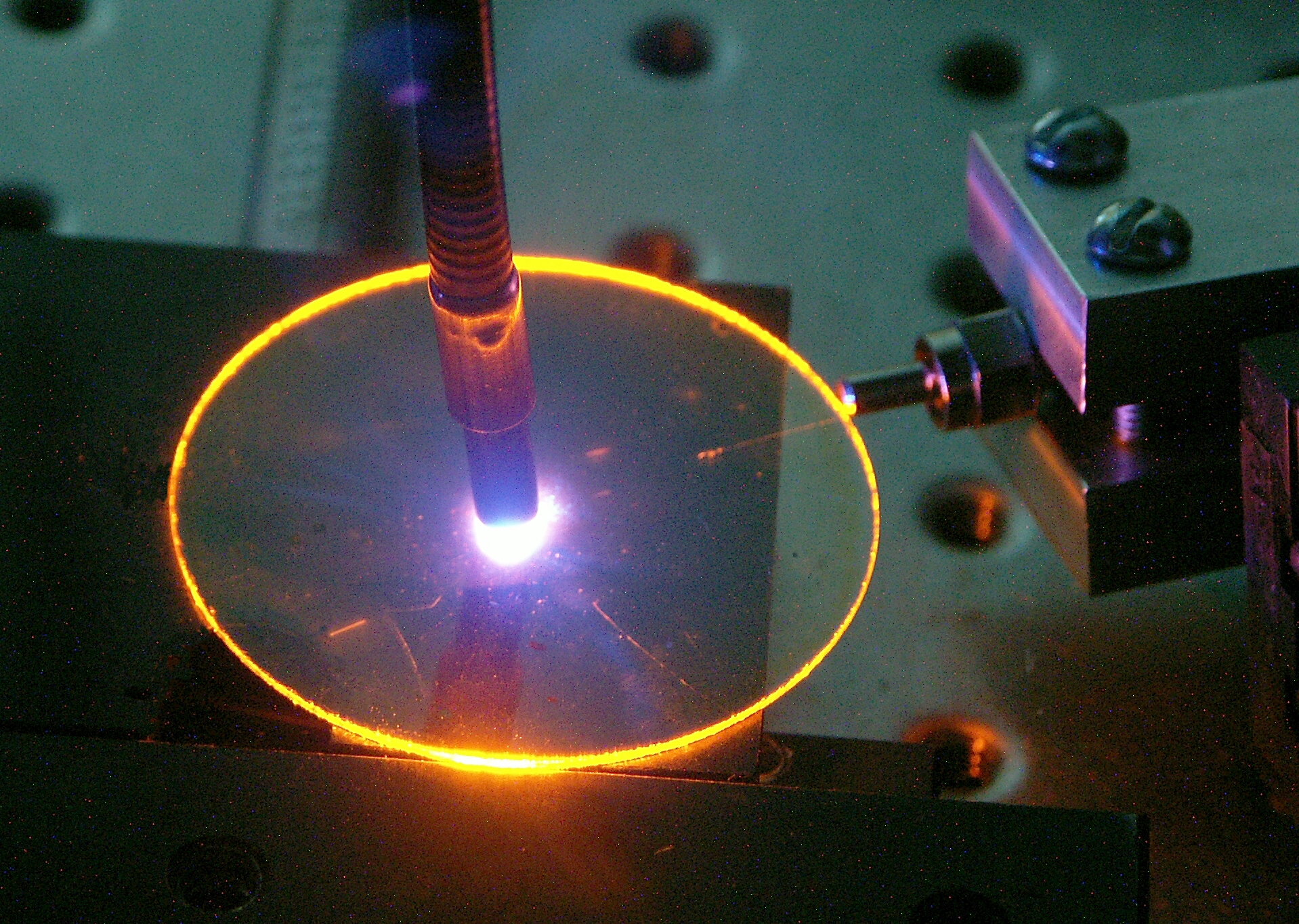
Photonics

and 1 Associate R&D Unit

- CISTER - Research Centre in Real-Time and Embedded Computing Systems

Chairman of INESC TEC: José Manuel Mendonça

President of the Scientific Council: Manuel António Matos

President of the Scientific Advisory Board: José Carlos Príncipe (University of Florida, USA)
