= Abel Salazar Institute of Biomedical Sciences =

Graduate school of the University of Porto

The School of Medicine and Biomedical Sciences Abel Salazar (Portuguese: Instituto de Ciências Biomédicas Abel Salazar, ICBAS) is a medical and life sciences graduate school of the University of Porto, named after the Portuguese and local physician Abel Salazar. The Institute teaches medicine – including specialities such as oncology, public health and mental health – as well as marine biology, veterinary medicine, biochemistry, and bioengineering.

== History ==
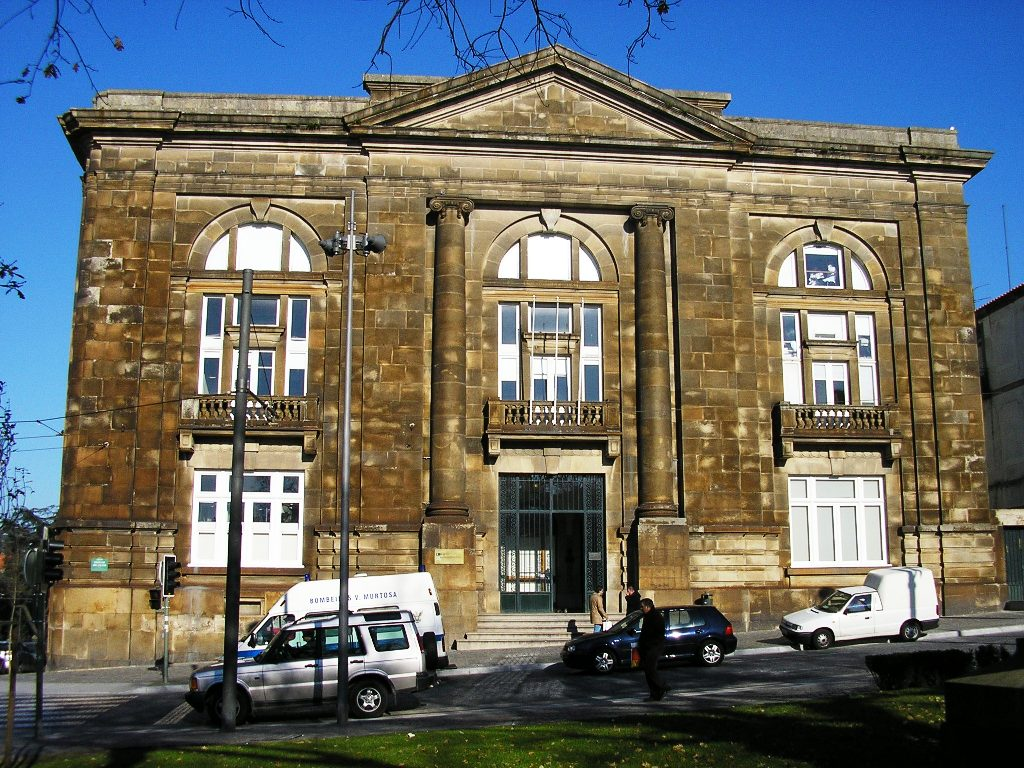
The former ICBAS main building, located next to the Santo António General Hospital in Porto's downtown.

The Institute of Biomedical Sciences Abel Salazar was created after the revolution occurred in 1974. Driven by the post 25 April spirit, the Porto academy joins the eight existing faculties of medicine in the country. ICBAS was created in May 1975, in an annex to the Rectory of the University of Porto building. Its genesis was based on a set of great principles, which shaped the profile that the Institute still has today: solid basic education and focus on advanced training, research and innovation.

Created in 1975, at the initiative of a group of personalities from the University of Porto, including Corino de Andrade, Ruy Luís Gomes and Nuno Grande, and inspired by the thought and work of his patron Abel Salazar, the Institute of Biomedical Sciences Abel Salazar (ICBAS) was assumed from the outset as a multidisciplinary and multiprofessional school in the area of Life Sciences, in a broad sense, adopting the statement “A doctor who only understands medicine not even medicine understand” (José de Letamendi) as the School's motto. This maxim is recorded in the main lobby of the old building.

== Medicine course ==
Medical training at ICBAS began in 1976, based on an innovative pedagogical and institutional project different from traditional medical training. This project has evolved in the face of new challenges and is now an Integrated Master in accordance with the new Basic Law of the Education System, intended to apply the principles set out in the “Bologna Process”. The new curriculum philosophy promotes early clinical contact for students, with an integrated approach to clinical problems from the early stages of the course. The new model promotes training in an even more articulated way, whether in the most basic sciences or in purely clinical sciences. The programmatic space for a truly vocational training was reinforced during the 6th and last year. The balance between exact, biological, social and medical sciences taught by multidisciplinary teams has been and continues to be one of the most innovative pedagogical goals of medicine at ICBAS. Moreover, in order to achieve the goal of training doctors with the most comprehensive preparation possible, ICBAS and the Porto Hospital Center (HGSA - which has been operating as the nuclear hospital since 1980) collaborate in the formation of medicine. In addition, ICBAS has established protocols with several health institutions in Greater Porto, such as the Joaquim Urbano Hospital, the Portuguese Institute of Oncology of Porto, the Magalhães Lemos Hospital and the Vila Nova de Gaia Hospital Center. several Health Centers that receive students under a cooperation protocol with ARS Norte.

== Teaching affiliates ==
- Oporto University Hospital Centre|CHP
- Santo Antonio General Hospital
- Northern Maternal and Child Center

== Student life ==
The Students Group for the Promotion of Integrative Medicine was founded in 2004.

On a wall of its main hall, the famous maxim of Abel Salazar can be read: "The one who only knows about Medicine, does not even know about Medicine."

== Related links ==
- Abel Salazar
- Corino Andrade
- Alexandre Quintanilha
- Ruy Luís Gomes
- Nuno Grande
