= Francisco Gomes Teixeira =

Portuguese mathematician

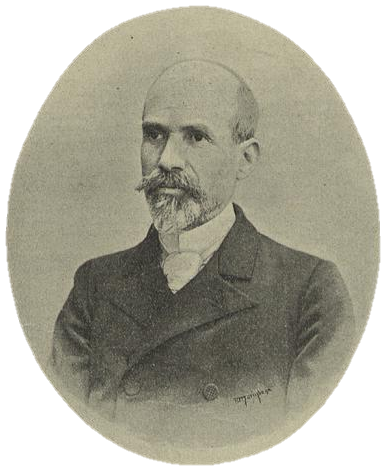
- Francisco Gomes Teixeira, ca. 1899
- Born: January 28, 1851; São Cosmado, Armamar, Portugal
- Died: February 8, 1933 (aged 82); Porto, Portugal
- Resting place: São Cosmado, Portugal
- Education: University of Coimbra
- Scientific career
- Fields: Mathematics; History of mathematics
- Workplaces: University of Coimbra; University of Porto

Francisco Gomes Teixeira (28 January 1851– 8 February 1933) was a Portuguese mathematician and first rector of the University of Porto.

== Biography ==
Francisco Gomes Teixeira studied in the University of Coimbra, earning a degree in mathematics in 1874 and a doctorate a year later. His thesis was related to integration of second order partial differential equations. He joined the University of Coimbra as a member of the faculty in 1876.

To promote visibility of Portuguese mathematicians, he created the Jornal de Sciencias Mathematicas e Astronomicas in 1877.

In 1876 he became a corresponding member of the Academia Real das Ciências de Lisboa.

Before the year 1890 most of his publications were on mathematical analysis but from 1890 onwards most were on geometry. He was named the third astronomer of the Observatório Astronómico de Lisboa in 1878, but only held this positions for about four months before returning to the University of Coimbra.

He was elected a parliamentary deputy by the Partido Regenerador in 1879 and participated in sessions of Parliament for that year and also in 1883 and 1884. In November 1879 he was put in charge of the University of Coimbra's chair of mathematical analysis and in February 1880 was formally appointed to this professorial chair.

In 1884 Gomes Teixeira was appointed to the chair of differential and integral calculus of the Academia Politécnica do Porto. In 1905 the Jornal de Sciencias Mathematicas e Astronomicas was integrated into the newly created Anais Scientificos da Academia Politécnica do Porto.

In 1911 at the newly formed University of Porto he became the first rector, retiring in 1917.

== Burial ==
His body is entombed in the Igreja Matriz de São Cosmado. The tomb consists of a granite sarcophagus with the following inscription:

SERAPHICO FRANCISCO ASSISIENSI
atque
DIVO ANTONIO OLYSIPPONENSI
hoc monumentum erexit
FRANCISCUS GOMES TEIXEIRA
qui hi jacet.

(Divo Antonio is Latin for St. Anthony. Olissipóna was the ancient name for Lisbon. Gomes Teixeira wrote a 1931 book Santo António de Lisboa (história, tradição e lenda) and a 1926 book Santuários de montahna (impressões de viagens.)

== Honors and awards ==
His Tratado de las Curvas Especiales Notables (Treatise on Remarkable Special Curves) won an award in 1899 from the Spanish Royal Academy of Sciences. A 3-volume French translation (with additions) was published in 1908 and 1909 as Traité des Courbes Spéciales Remarquables Planes et Gauches. He received in 1917 the prix Binoux d'histoire des sciences from the French Academy of Sciences.

Gomes Teixeira received honorary doctorates from the University of Madrid and the University of Toulouse.

=== Eponymous tributes ===
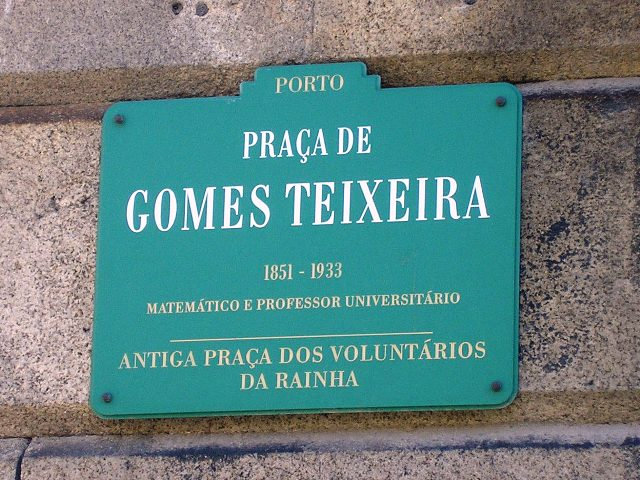
plaque commemorating Gomes Teixeira in Porto's Praça de Gomes Teixeira (where the rector's residence was located)

- Praça de Gomes Teixeira (Gomes Teixeira Square), Porto
- Rua Professor Doutor Francisco Gomes Teixeira, Porto
- Rua Professor Doutor Francisco Gomes Teixeira em Carnaxide, Oeiras
- Rua Francisco Gomes Teixeira em Setúbal, Setúbal
- Sala Gomes Teixeira: Piso 4 Edifíco da Reitoria da Universidade do Porto
- Agrupamento de Escolas Gomes Teixeira-Praça da Galiza, 4150-344 Porto
- Escola básica dos 2.º e 3.º ciclos Gomes Teixeira - Armamar
- approximate location of the statue of Dr. Gomes Teixeira in the village of São Cosmado from Google Street View

== Selected publications ==
- Integração das equações às derivadas parciaes de segunda ordem. Coimbra: Imprensa da Universidade. 1875.
- Corso de analyse infinitesimal. Vol. 1–3. Porto; 1892–1896
- Tratado de las Curvas Especiales Notables. Madrid: Imprenta de la "Gaceta de Madrid". 1905.
- Traité des Courbes Spéciales Remarquables Planes et Gauches. Vol. Tome I. Coimbra: Imprensa da Universidade. 1908.; Tome II. 1909.; Tome III. 1909.. translated into French from the Spanish version but with revisions and extensive additions. Re-published in the Obras sobre Matemática, volumes IV, V et VII, 1908–1915; Chelsea Publishing Co, New York, 1971; Éditions Jacques Gabay, Paris, 1995.
- Obras sobre Matemática. Coimbra: Imprensa da Universidade., vol. I, 1904; vol. II, 1906; vol. III, 1906; vol. IV, 1908; vol. V, 1909; vol. VI, 1912; vol. VII, 1915.
- Sur les Problèmes célèbres de la Géométrie élémentaire non résolubles avec la Règle et le Compas. Coimbra: Imprensa da Universidade. 1915.
- Panegíricos e conferências. Coimbra: Imprensa da Universidade. 1925.
- História das matemáticas em Portugal. Lisboa: Academia das Ciências de Lisboa. 1934.
