= Teresa Lago =

Portuguese astronomer

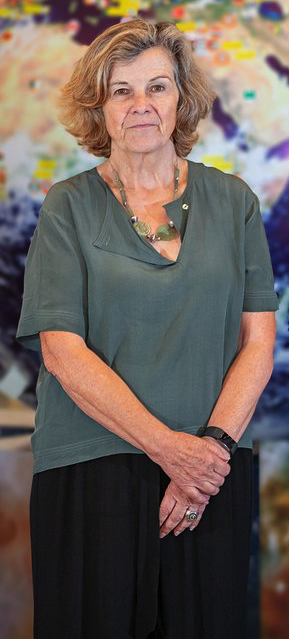
- Born: Maria Theresa V.T. Lago; 18 January 1947 (age 79); Lisbon, Portugal
- Scientific career
- Fields: Astrophysics, astronomy
- Workplaces: University of Porto, International Astronomical Union

Maria Teresa Vaz Torrão Lago (born 18 January 1947) is a Portuguese astronomer. She founded the Centre for Astrophysics of the University of Porto and created the first astronomy degree program in Portugal. Lago was the General Secretary of the International Astronomical Union between 2018 and 2021. Her research focuses on the evolution of young stars and she is active in the promotion of astronomy and scientific culture to the public.

== Career ==
Maria Teresa Vaz Torrão Lago graduated from the University of Porto and received a Ph.D in Astronomy from the University of Sussex in 1979. Her dissertation, Observational and Theoretical Study of T Tauri Stars was written under advisor Leon Mestel. She led the creation of the first astronomy degree in Portugal at the University of Porto in 1983, where she remains a professor. In 1988, she founded the Centre for Astrophysics at the University of Porto and served as its director for 18 years. She helped promote the signing of the 1990 cooperation agreement which led to Portugal joining the European Southern Observatory.

Lago has served on several research and advisory organizations outside of Portugal including the Space Science Advisory Committee of the European Space Agency and the board of the School of Cosmic Physics at the Dublin Institute for Advanced Studies. She was a founding member of the European Research Council. She also served as chair of the ERC's Gender balance working group.

Lago has held leadership positions at the International Astronomical Union including Assistant General Secretary of the Executive Committee and advisor to the Special Nominating Committee. As of 2018, Lago was the General Secretary of the IAU.

Lago is a member of the UK's Royal Astronomical Society and the Academia Europaea.

== Recognition ==
In 1985, Lago won a Henri Chrétien grant from the American Astronomical Society. Lago was awarded the Ciência Viva Montepio Award in 2018 for her contribution to promoting scientific culture.
