= Corino Andrade =

Portuguese neurologist and researcher (1906–2005)

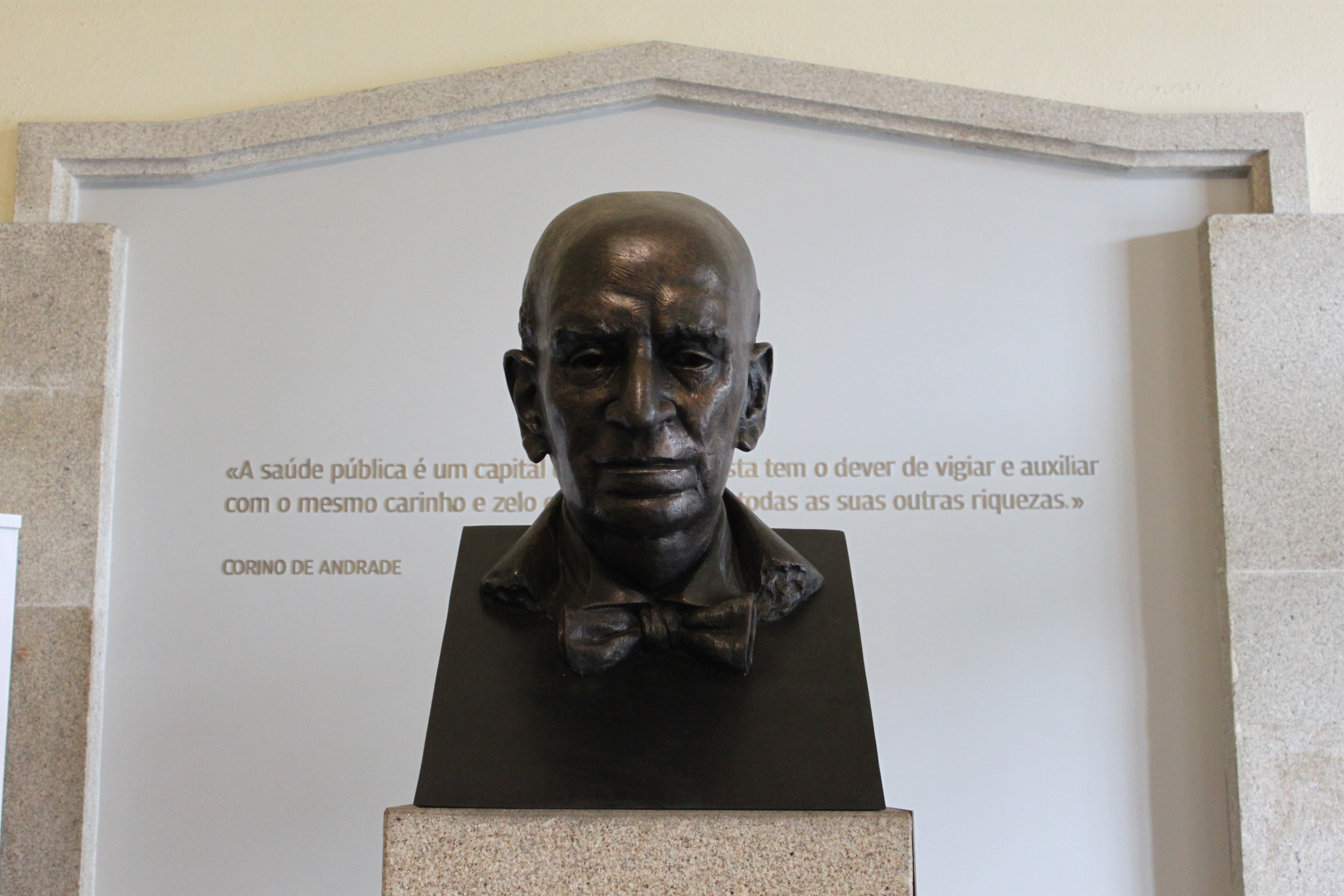
- Born: Mário Corino da Costa Andrade; 10 June 1906; Moura, Portugal
- Died: 16 June 2005 (aged 99); Porto, Portugal
- Known for: Describing the familial amyloidotic polyneuropathy syndrome
- Scientific career
- Fields: Neurology, genetics
- Institutions: Instituto de Ciências Biomédicas Abel Salazar (founder)

Mário Corino da Costa Andrade (10 June 1906 in Moura – 16 June 2005 in Porto) was a leading twentieth century Portuguese neurologist and researcher who first described the familial amyloidotic polyneuropathy (FAP) syndrome that later came to be associated with his name (Corino de Andrade disease).

Corino was a founder of the Instituto de Ciências Biomédicas Abel Salazar, a major bioscience research institute located in Porto.

A staunch opponent of the Salazar regime, Andrade was imprisoned by the Portuguese Secret Police (PIDE) for belonging to a political group critical of the government.

He spent a great deal of time collaborating with scientists abroad and had a profound effect on the structure and organization of the current healthcare system in northern Portugal.
