= Abel Salazar (scientist) =

Portuguese physician (1889–1946)

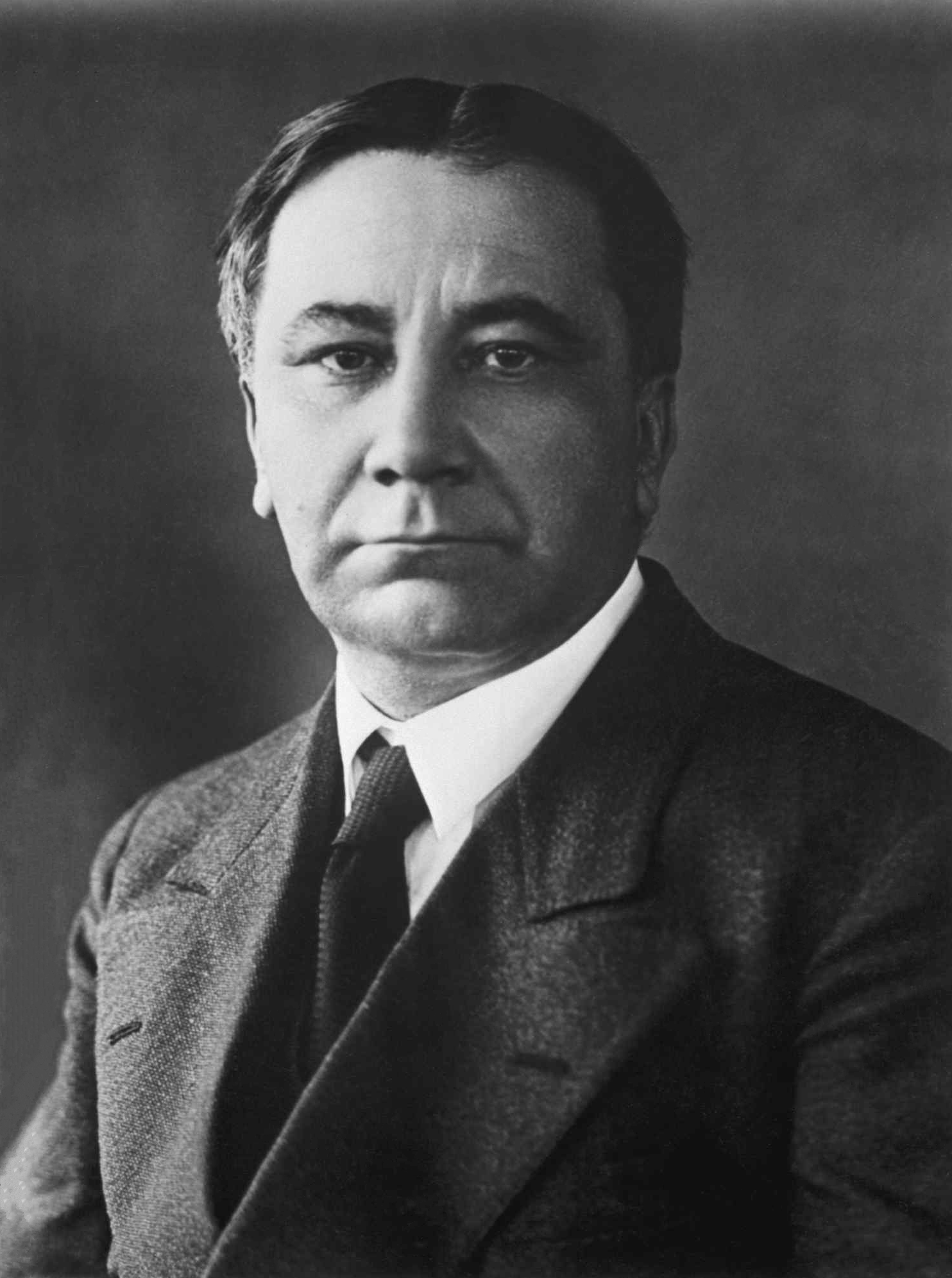
- Abel Salazar in 1945
- Born: 19 July 1889; Guimarães, Portugal
- Died: 29 December 1946 (aged 57); Lisbon, Portugal
- Education: Surgical-Medical School of Porto
- Scientific career
- Fields: Medicine
- Workplaces: Faculty of Medicine of the University of Porto

Abel de Lima Salazar (19 July 1889 – 29 December 1946) was a Portuguese physician, lecturer, researcher, writer and painter.

== Biography ==
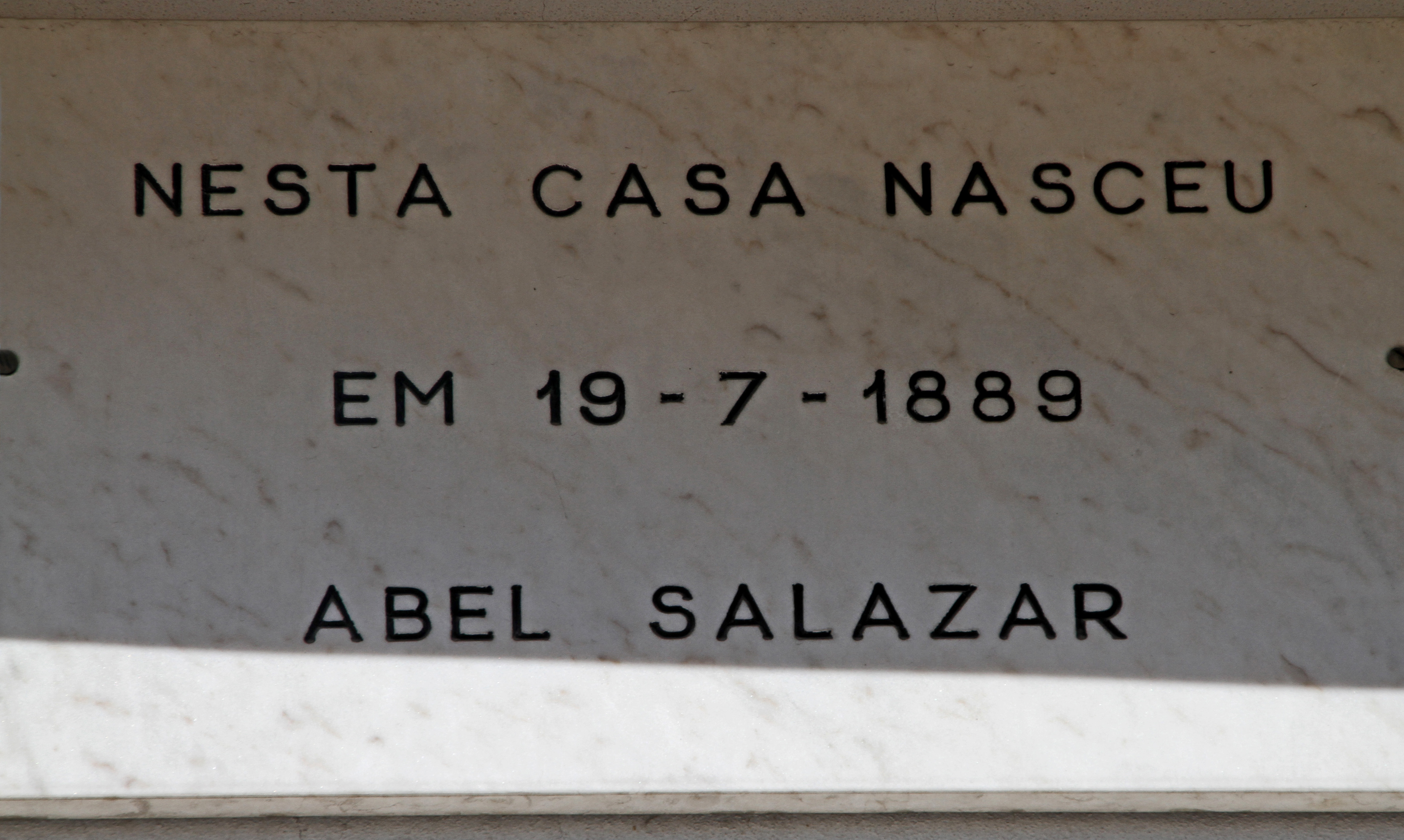
Memorial plate in Guimarães

Salazar was born on 19 July 1889 in Guimarães. He was the son of Adolfo Barroso Pereira Salazar (1858–1941) and wife Adelaide da Luz da Silva e Lima (died 1929). He worked and lived in Porto, both as a scientist and an artist. He founded the institute of histology and embryology at the University of Porto in 1916, and later led the centre for microscopic studies. One of his key collaborators was hematologist Adelaide Estrada.

Founded in 1975, the Instituto de Ciências Biomédicas Abel Salazar (in English Abel Salazar Biomedical Sciences Institute), a research center and biosciences school of the University of Porto, was named after him.

He was an anti-fascist and his painting with his social references anticipates the neo-realist movement in the Portuguese painting.

== Work ==
After his forced departure from academic life, Salazar cultivated a diverse artistic practice at home. His output included engravings, mural paintings, oil landscapes, portraits, illustrations of the lives of working women and Parisian women, watercolors, drawings, caricatures, sculptures, and hammered metal covers. Salazar anticipated the neo-realist movement in Portuguese painting. He focused on humanistic themes, everyday life, and working-class figures, as in Feira, Sol poente (Fair, setting sun). Many of these works are now housed at the Abel Salazar House-Museum. In addition to his visual art, Salazar produced a significant body of theoretical work in which art, science, and philosophy converge, forming a unique and interdisciplinary knowledge framework.

In 2010, a selection of his most significant artistic works was presented to the public at the Soares dos Reis National Museum in Porto. The exhibition, titled Transparência - Abel Salazar e o Seu Tempo, um Olhar (Transparency - Abel Salazar and His Time, a Look), was curated by Manuel Valente Alves to commemorate the centenary of the Republic. The exhibition aimed to highlight the internal cohesion of Salazar’s discourse, his interdisciplinary approach, and the connections he established with the most relevant artistic movements of his era.
