= Centre for Astrophysics of the University of Porto =

Coordinates: 41°09′02.29″N 8°38′19.18″W

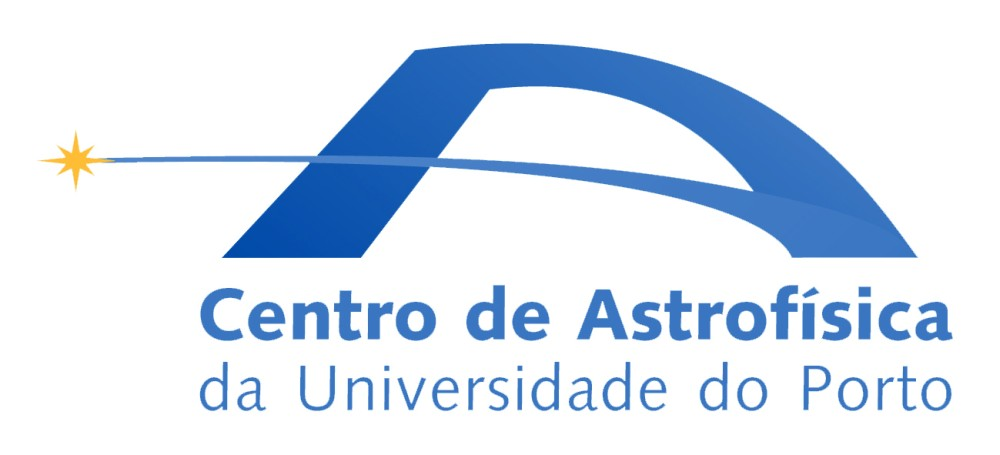
CAUP logo

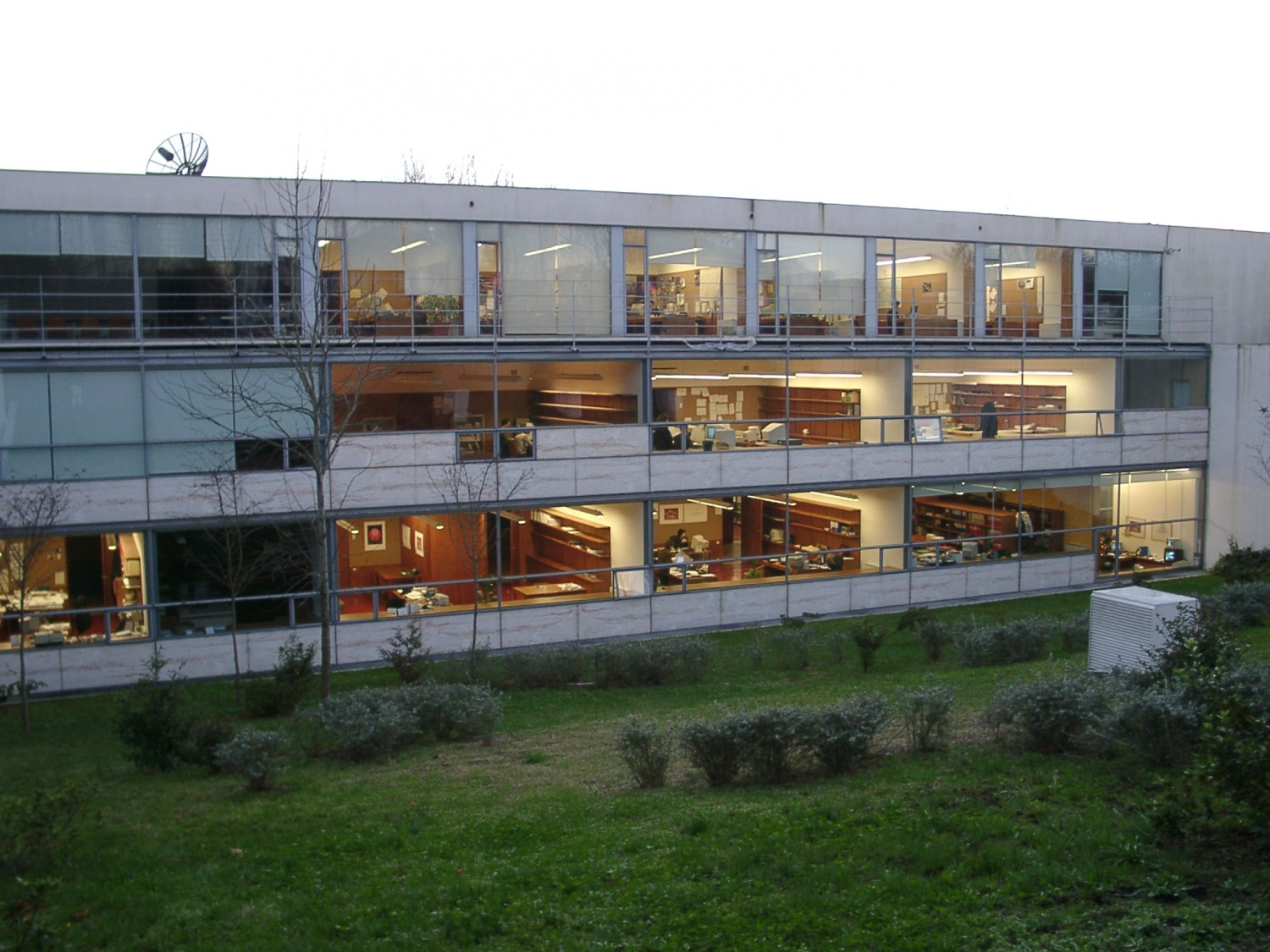
View of CAUP, from the interior garden of the CAUP/Planetário do Porto building

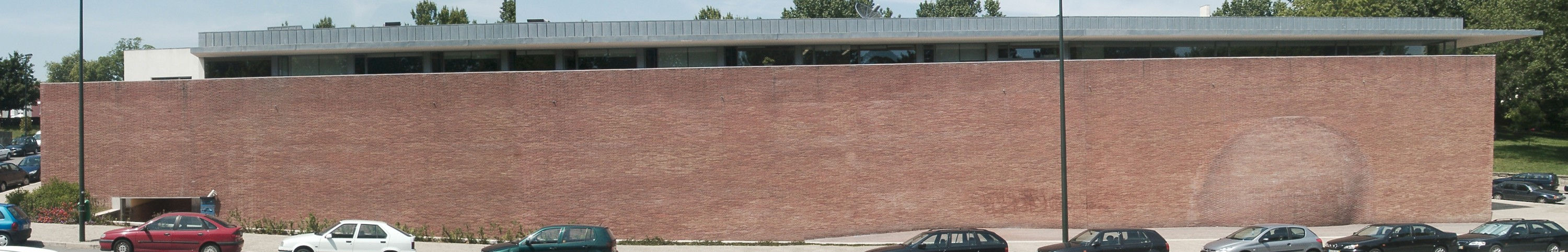
Facade of the Planetário do Porto/CAUP building

The Centro de Astrofísica da Universidade do Porto (Centre for Astrophysics of the University of Porto - CAUP) is a private, non-profit scientific association, recognized as being of public utility by the Portuguese Government. It was created in May of 1989 by the Universidade do Porto.

Its objectives include the promotion and support of astronomy through

- research
- education at graduate and undergraduate levels
- activities for primary and secondary schools
- science outreach and the popularisation of astronomy

CAUP is responsible for the scientific management of the Porto Planetarium.

== Research ==
CAUP's research activity is developed through the Instituto de Astrofísica e Ciências do Espaço (IA), an R&D unit registered in Portugal's Foundation for Science and Technology (Fundação para a Ciência e Tecnologia - FCT), which resulted from the merger of the two most prominent research units in the field in Portugal: CAUP, at the University of Porto, and the Centro de Astronomia e Astrofísica da Universidade de Lisboa (CAAUL), at the University of Lisbon. In 2021, IA expanded with the creation of the University of Coimbra pole.

IA's research is organized in the following groups:

- Towards the detection and characterization of other Earths
- Towards a comprehensive study of stars
- The assembly history of galaxies resolved in space and time
- Unveiling the dynamics of the Universe
- Astronomical Instrumentation and Systems
- Science Communication

== Science Communication ==
Through its Outreach Unit, CAUP promotes science communication activities aimed at schools, the general public and media. It is a part of IA's Science Communication Group and CAUP is responsible for managing the Porto Planetarium - Ciência Viva Center.

== CAUP Directors ==
- Maria Teresa V. T. Lago (1989–2006)
- Mário João P. F. G. Monteiro (2006–2012)
- Pedro Pina Avelino (2012–2014)
- João José F. G. A. Lima (2015–2018)
- Jarle Brinchmann (2018-2024)
