= António Gedeão =

Portuguese poet, essayist, writer and playwright

António Gedeão (b. Rómulo Vasco da Gama Carvalho, GCSE, GOIP; 24 November 1906 – 19 February 1997) was a Portuguese poet, essayist, writer and playwright, who also published several works related to science. António Gedeão was an alter ego of Rómulo de Carvalho, who, using his real name was also a professor, teaching chemistry and history of science.

== Bibliography ==
=== Poetry ===
- 1956 - Movimento Perpétuo
- 1958 - Teatro do Mundo
- 1959 - Declaração de Amor
- 1961 - Máquina de Fogo
- 1964 - Poesias Completas
- 1967 - Linhas de Força
- 1980 - Soneto
- 1982 - Poema para Galileu
- 1984 - Poemas Póstumos
- 1985 - Poemas dos textos
- 1990 - Novos Poemas Póstumos

=== Fiction ===
1942 - Bárbara Ruiva (1ª edição: Abril 2009)

1973 - A poltrona e outras novelas

1969 - O Boda

=== Theatre ===
- 1978 - RTX 78/24
- 1981 - História Breve da Lua

=== Essays ===
- 1965 - O Sentimento Científico em Bocage
- 1975 - Ay Flores, Ay flores do verde pino

=== Scientific works ===
==== Pedagogic ====
- 1950 - Regras de notação e nomenclatura química
- 1952 - Considerações sobre o ensino elementar da Física
- 1953 - Compêndio de Química para o 3º Ciclo
- 1957 - Experiências escolares sobre tensão superficial dos líquidos e sobre lâminas da solução de sabão
- 1957 - Guias de trabalhos práticos de Química
- 1959 - Acerca do número de imagens dadas pelos espelhos planos inclinados entre si
- 1959 - A física como objecto de ensino
- 1959 - Problemas de Física para o 3º Ciclo do Ensino Liceal, I volume
- 1961 - Considerações sobre o princípio de Arquimedes
- 1962 - Novas maneiras de trabalhar com os tubos de Torricelli
- 1962 - Novo sistema de unidades físicas
- 1963 - Novo dispositivo para o estudo experimental das leis de reflexão da luz
- 1963 - Sobre os compêndios universitários exigidos pela Reforma Pombalina
- 1964 - O ensino elementar da Cinemática por meio de gráficos
- 1964 - Teoria e prática da ponte de Wheatstone
- 1965 - La formation du professeur de physique
- 1974 - Ciências da Natureza
- 1986 - História do ensino em Portugal
