= Science and technology in Portugal =

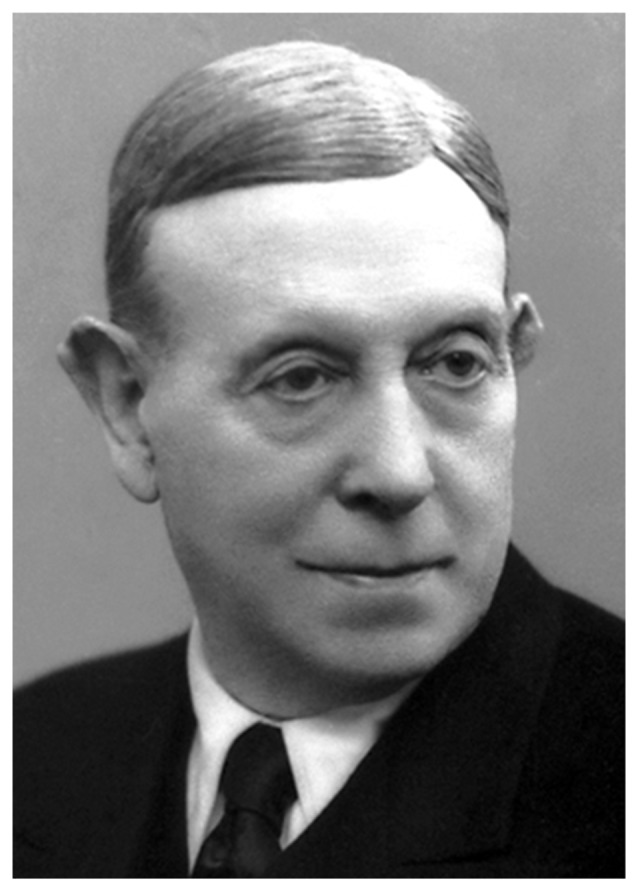
António Egas Moniz was a Portuguese neurologist and winner of the Nobel Prize in Physiology and Medicine in 1949.

Science and technology in Portugal is mainly conducted within a network of research and development (R&D) units belonging to public universities and state-managed autonomous research institutions. There are also non-state-run research institutions and some private R&D projects developed by companies.

== History ==
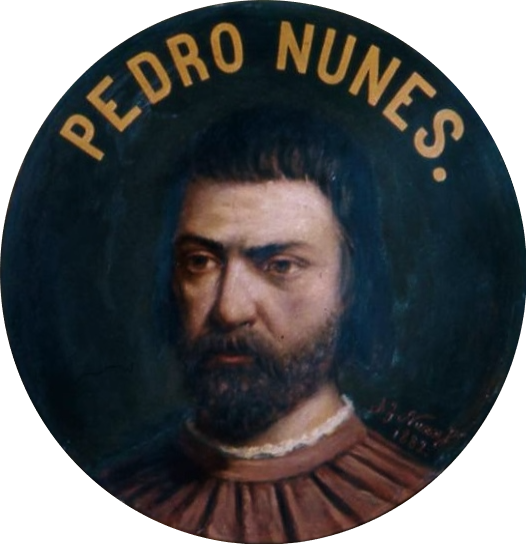
Pedro Nunes (1502 – 1578) was a famed mathematician of the Portuguese Renaissance.

The first university of Portugal was founded in 1290 as a Studium Generale in Lisbon. It was focused on the arts and humanities, but also included a medical school since its foundation.

During the 16th century, in the Age of Discovery, a more mathematical educational approach flourished in this university with the creation of specialized courses and classes in the field. This included the appointment of Pedro Nunes as mathematics teacher, in 1537, when the Portuguese university located in Lisbon was relocated back to Coimbra, and Nunes moved to the re-founded University of Coimbra to teach mathematics, a post he held until 1562. This was a new post in the University of Coimbra and it was established to provide instruction in the technical requirements for navigation: clearly a topic of great importance in Portugal at this period, when control of sea trade was the primary source of Portuguese wealth. Mathematics became an independent post in 1544. In the 17th century, military engineering teaching was also established in the Fortification, Artillery and Drawing Royal Academy of Lisbon.

By the 18th century, under the enlightened political leadership of the Marquis of Pombal, the University of Coimbra was modernized with the appointment of new professors, both Portuguese and foreigners, and the establishment of several facilities directed towards the teaching of the natural sciences. Also in the 18th century, one of the oldest learned societies of Portugal, the Lisbon Academy of Sciences, was founded in 1779.

Historically, within the scope of the now defunct Portuguese Empire, the Portuguese founded in 1792 the oldest engineering school of Latin America (the Real Academia de Artilharia, Fortificação e Desenho), as well as one of the oldest medical colleges of Asia (the Escola Médico-Cirúrgica de Goa) in 1842.

In 1911, the oldest non-military Portuguese university degree-conferring institution of engineering was founded - it was the Instituto Superior Técnico, in Lisbon, as well as new Science Faculties in the newly founded University of Lisbon and Porto.

=== Post-World War II ===
The Champalimaud Centre for the Unknown is one of the world's leading research centers in neuroscience and oncology.

In 1949, the Portuguese neurologist António Egas Moniz, an early developer of the cerebral angiography, was awarded the Nobel Prize in Medicine.

The Instituto Gulbenkian de Ciência (IGC) an international centre for biomedical research and graduate education, located in Oeiras, Portugal, was founded by the Calouste Gulbenkian Foundation (FCG) in 1961. Its campus includes other research institutes in biology, biotechnology and chemistry, with complementary research interests and facilities: protein structure and design, synthesis and theory of chemicals with biological interest, molecular microbiology, plant biotechnology, biotechnology, downstream processing, etc. The excellence of the IGC was attested by rankings published in 2010 and 2011, when the IGC was ranked as one of the Top Ten best Places for post-docs, by The Scientist - Faculty of 1000.

The Champalimaud Foundation, based in Lisbon, Portugal, was created at the bequest of the late Portuguese industrialist and entrepreneur, António de Sommer Champalimaud. At the end of 2004 it was officially incorporated as the Anna de Sommer Champalimaud and Dr. Carlos Montez Champalimaud Foundation, in honour of the benefactor's parents. The Champalimaud Foundation's focus is on the fields of neuroscience and oncology. On October 5, 2010, the Foundation inaugurated a clinical and research centre in Lisbon - the Champalimaud Centre for the Unknown.

On November 19, 2005, the International Iberian Nanotechnology Laboratory to be built in Braga, was announced by the head of Government of Spain and the Prime Minister of Portugal at the end of the XXI Portugal-Spain Summit that took place in Évora.

== Research and development ==
The Lisbon Academy of Sciences, founded in 1779, is one of the oldest and most prestigious scientific institutions in the country.

In Portugal, a network of research and development units belonging to public universities and state-managed autonomous research institutions like the INETI - Instituto Nacional de Engenharia, Tecnologia e Inovação, the ITN - Instituto Tecnológico e Nuclear, the INRB - Instituto Nacional dos Recursos Biológicos, the INSA - Instituto Nacional de Saúde Dr. Ricardo Jorge, the IPO - Instituto Português de Oncologia, the LNEC - Laboratório Nacional de Engenharia Civil and the LIP - Laboratório de Instrumentação e Física Experimental de Partículas, makes the core of Portugal's science and technology research output. The funding of this research system is mainly conducted under the authority of the Ministry of Science, Technology and Higher Education, namely through its foundation for science and technology, the FCT - Fundação para a Ciência e Tecnologia.

The largest R&D units of the public universities (over 380 units in total which are distributed across 14 public universities) by number of peer-reviewed publications and research grants, include the IPATIMUP, the Instituto de Biologia Molecular e Celular and the Abel Salazar Biomedical Sciences Institute, all of them at the University of Porto; the Instituto de Medicina Molecular at the University of Lisbon; or the Centre for Neuroscience and Cell Biology at the University of Coimbra, among others. Private universities have a lower research output, however, there are a number of research units accredited by the Ministry and the FCT, these include the Facial Emotion Expression Lab at the University Fernando Pessoa. Although smaller and generally with less resources devoted to investigation than the universities, since after the Bologna Process (2006/2007) which allowed the polytechnical institutions to award masters' degrees and required the admission of doctorate-level staff, an increasingly large number of Portuguese polytechnical institutions have also established and expanded their own research facilities. However, polytechnic's limited research activities are very small when compared to the state-run universities due to both a lack of research budget and doctorate-level teaching staff and investigators.

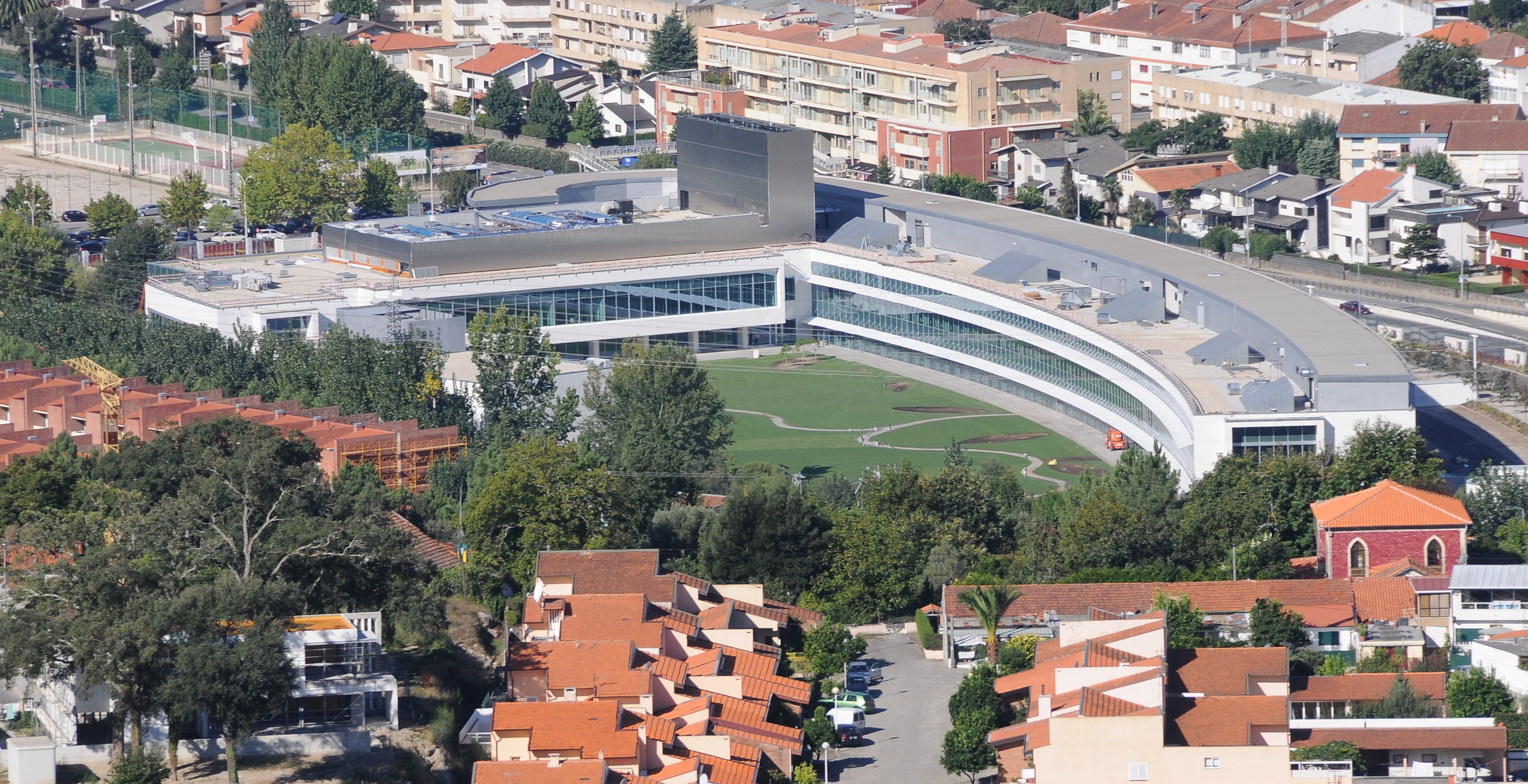
The International Iberian Nanotechnology Laboratory, created in 2005, is based in Braga.

Several other scientific fields are covered by specialized research organizations which are noted for their role as technology business incubators, like the International Iberian Nanotechnology Laboratory, the Instituto Pedro Nunes and Taguspark, a science park. The largest non-state-run research institutions in Portugal, include the Instituto Gulbenkian de Ciência and the Champalimaud Foundation which recognises outstanding contributions to research in vision and associated areas through a major annual award.

The Champalimaud Foundation's research center at the mouth of the River Tagus in Lisbon, opened in 2010 with diagnostic and treatment units for cancer patients on the lower floors and research labs above. The Ibercivis, a distributed computing platform, based on BOINC, that allows all ordinary citizens to participate on scientific research in a direct way and in real time as volunteer donors of unused computer cycles is a joint scientific collaboration of the Portuguese and Spanish governments. The Bial Foundation (Fundação Bial), named after a Portuguese pharmaceutical company, awards one of Portugal's most noted prizes for scientific research in the area of health. A number of both national and multinational high-tech and industrial companies present in Portugal, are also responsible for research and development projects in different fields. The Academia das Ciências de Lisboa (Academy of Sciences of Lisbon), created in 1779, is one of the oldest learned societies in Portugal.

The sole Portuguese science-related Laureate, having been awarded the Nobel Prize in Medicine in 1949, was Egas Moniz.

=== Research and development output ===
In 2001 Portugal was ranked 28th among countries that contributed to the top 1% of the world's highly cited publications. Accounting for 0.25% of these publications, Portugal ranked above South Africa (0.21%) and Iran (0.04%), but below Spain (2.08%), Ireland (0.36%), and Greece (0.3%). Portugal was ranked 31st in the Global Innovation Index in 2025.

==== European Innovation Scoreboard ====
===== 2010 report =====
According to the European Innovation Scoreboard 2010, Portugal is one of the moderate innovators with a below average performance. Relative strengths are in open, excellent and attractive research systems, finance and support and innovators. Relative weaknesses are in firm investments, intellectual assets and outputs. Positive growth is observed for most indicators, and in particular for business R&D expenditure, PCT patent applications in societal challenges and community designs. A substantial decline can be observed for venture capital and non-R&D innovation expenditure over the 5-year reference period, although venture capital has almost doubled in 2009 with respect to 2008. Growth performance in open, excellent and attractive research systems, linkages & entrepreneurship and intellectual assets is above average. In the other dimensions it is below average.

===== 2011 report =====
The European Innovation Scoreboard 2011, placed Portugal-based innovation in the 15th position, with an impressive increase in innovation expenditure and output.

=== Accredited R&D centers belonging to higher learning institutions ===
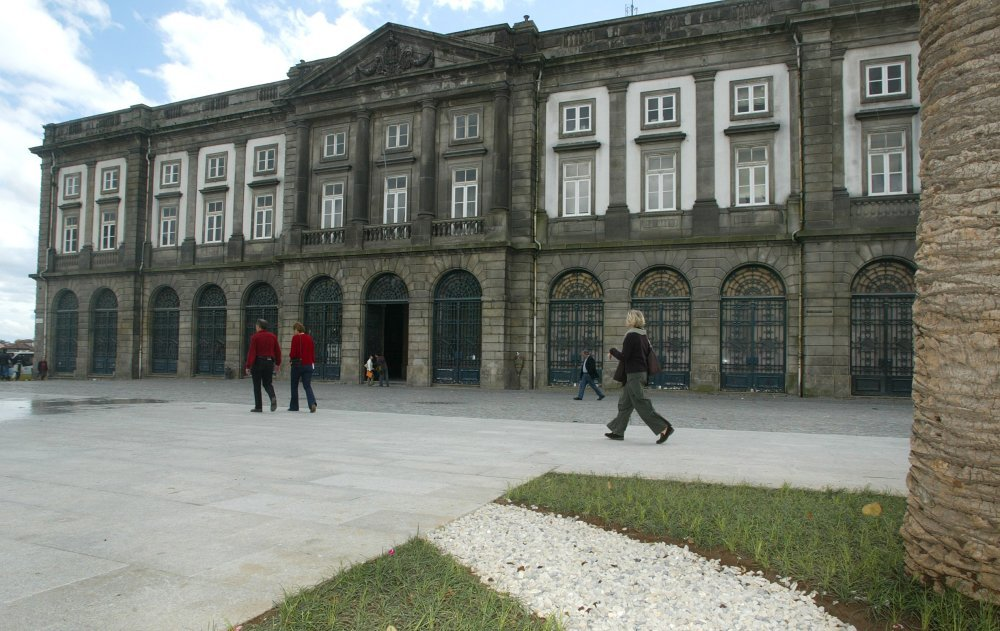
The University of Porto is, after the University of Lisbon (resulting from the merger of the old University of Lisbon and the Technical University of Lisbon in 2013), the second largest university by research output in Portugal.

Research centers belonging to higher learning institutions accredited by FCT - Fundação para a Ciência e a Tecnologia, as of 2004:

Type of institution	Number of research centers	Number of institutions
Public universities	384	14
Public polytechnics	8	15
Catholic University	14	1
Private universities	7	N/A
Other private institutions	20	N/A
Total	433	N/A

=== Portugal's European integration in science and technology ===
Within Europe and the European Union (EU), Portugal has full membership into several pan-European scientific organizations like the European Space Agency (ESA), the European Laboratory for Particle Physics (CERN), ITER, and the European Southern Observatory (ESO). Portuguese scientists and technicians work in all of those organizations. In the period 2005–2007, Portugal was the EU member state with the highest growth rate in research and development (R&D) investment as a percentage of the GDP - a 46% growth. Portugal's R&D investment equals 1.2% of Portuguese GDP. This was the 15th largest allocation of funds as a percentage of the GDP for R&D, among the 27 EU member states in 2007.

== Science museums, exhibits and divulgation ==
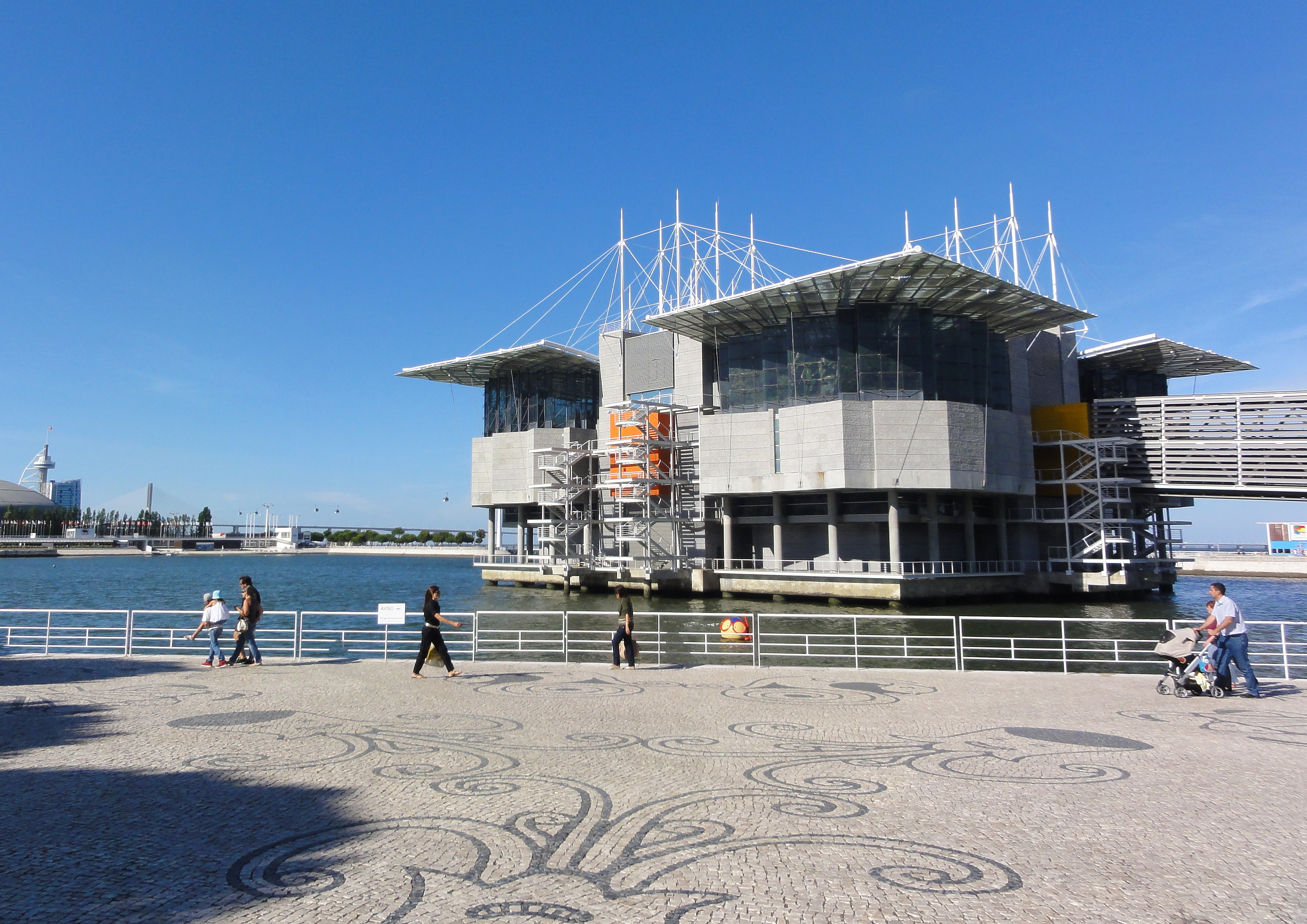
The Lisbon Oceanarium is the largest aquarium in Europe.

Notable organizations focused on science-related exhibits and divulgation, include the state agency Ciência Viva, a programme of the Portuguese Ministry of Science and Technology to the promotion of a scientific and technological culture among the Portuguese population, the Science Museum of the University of Coimbra, the Museum of Natural History at the University of Lisbon, the Visionarium and the Lisbon Oceanarium.

== Science parks ==
With the emergence and growth of several science parks throughout the world which helped create many thousands of scientific, technological and knowledge-based businesses, Portugal started to develop several science parks across the country. These include the Taguspark (in Oeiras), the Coimbra inovação Parque (in Coimbra), the Biocant park (in Cantanhede), the Tecmaia (in Maia), the Parque de Ciência e Tecnologia do Porto (in Santa Maria da Feira and Guimarães), the Madeira Tecnopolo (in Funchal), Sines Tecnopolo (in Sines) and Parkurbis (in Covilhã). Companies locate in the Portuguese science parks to take advantage of a variety of services ranging from financial and legal advice through to marketing and technological support.

== Noted contributors to science and technology ==
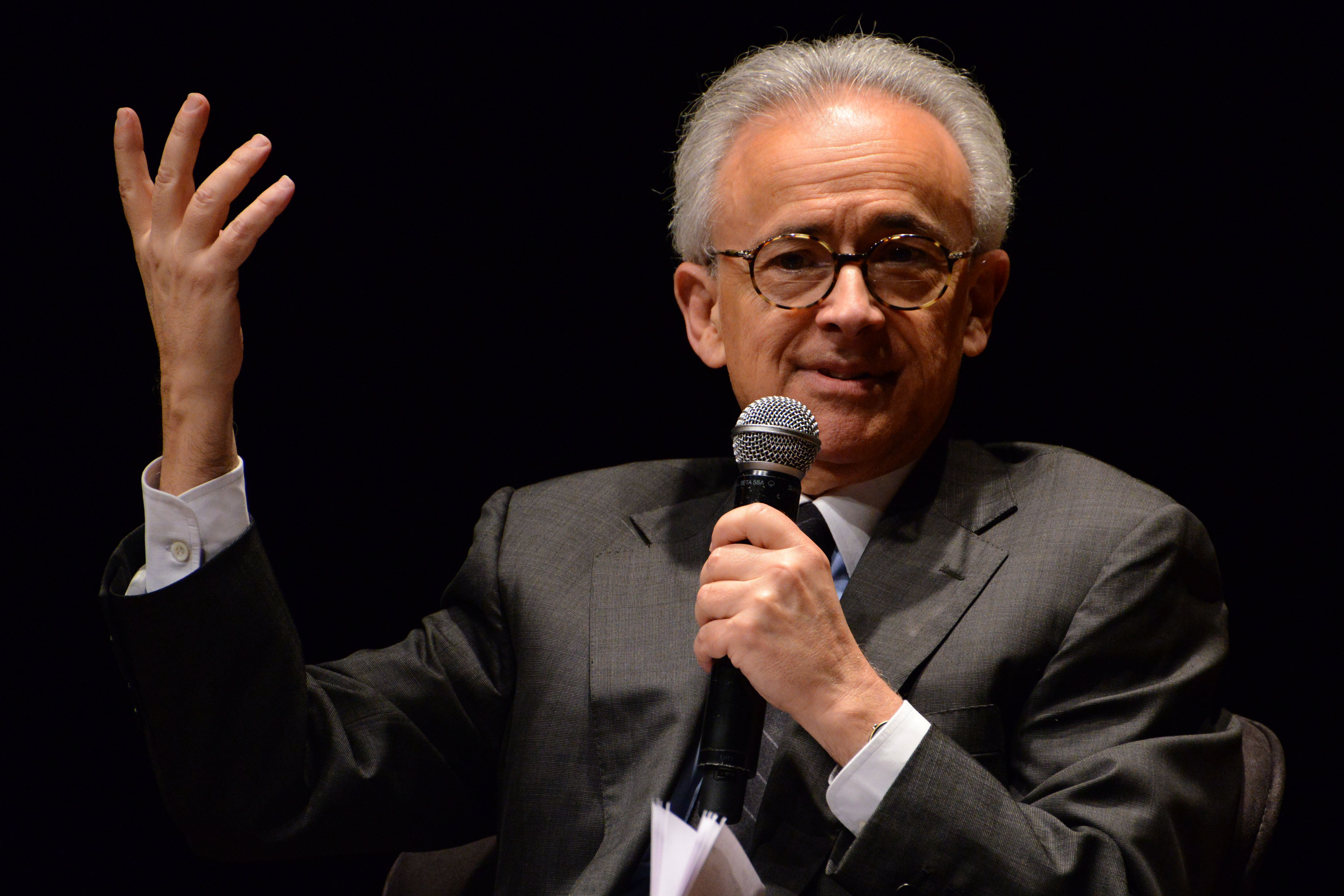
António Damásio, world-renowned neuroscientist.

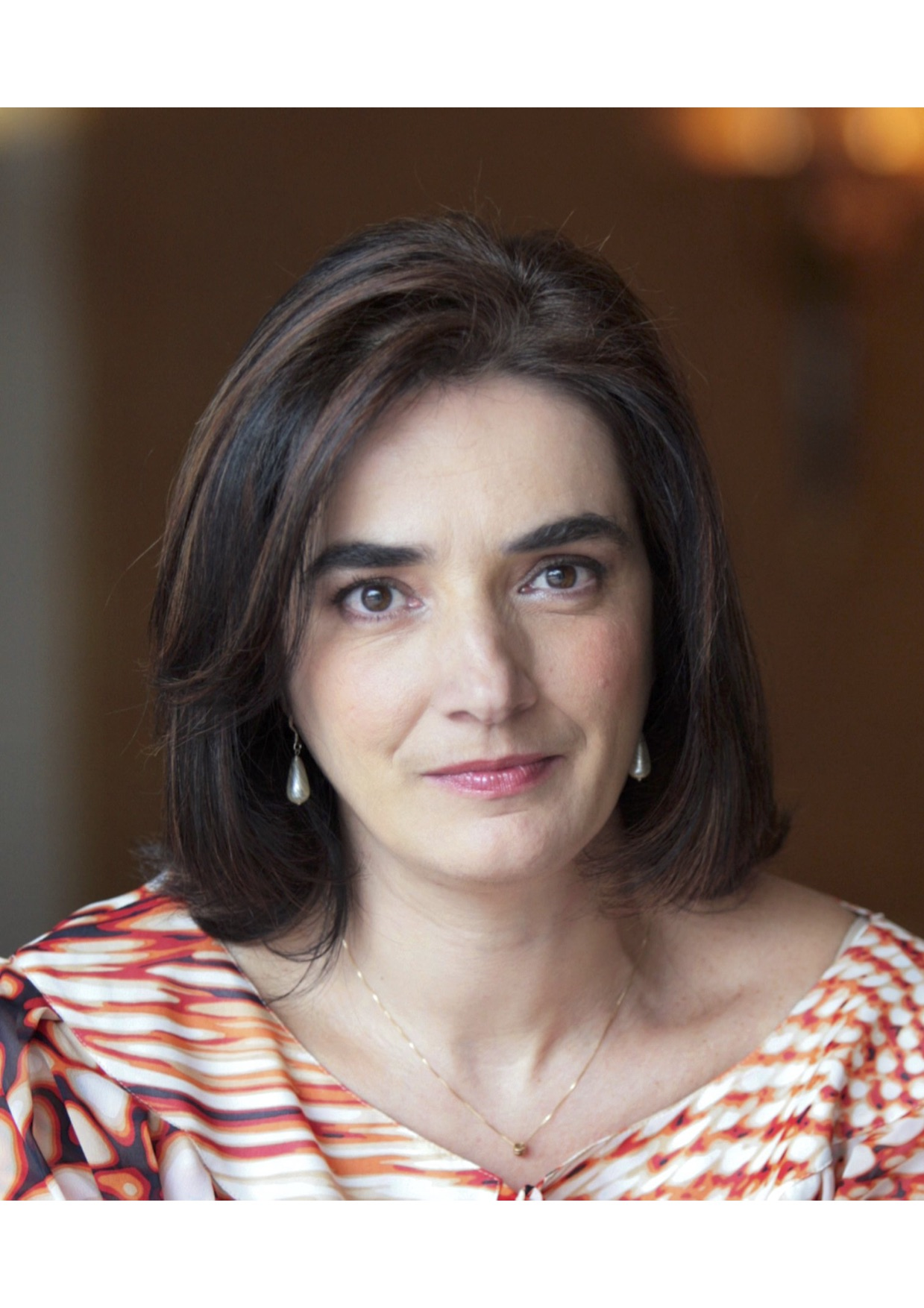
Elvira Fortunato, award-winning scientist and innovator in the field of paper electronics.

Some examples of notable Portuguese people who had made important contributions to science and technology, becoming in their time internationally known within their respective field, include:

- Corino Andrade - 20th century researcher who first described the familial amyloidotic polyneuropathy
- António Damásio - 20th/21st century researcher in several areas of the neurology, and a best-selling author of books which describe his scientific thinking
- Elvira Fortunato - Born in 1964, a professor, scientist and innovator in the field of paper electronics, including transistors, memories, sensors, batteries, displays, antennas, and solar cells
- Amato Lusitano - 16th century physician, discovered the circulation of the blood, was one of the first to observe and speculate about the venous valves found in the azygos vein
- Froilano de Mello - 20th century microbiologist and medical scientist
- Egas Moniz - 20th century Nobel Prize in Medicine "for his discovery of the therapeutic value of leucotomy in certain psychoses", he also was a pioneer in the development of cerebral angiography
- Pedro Nunes - 16th century mathematician, one of the greatest of his time, he is best known for his contributions in the technical field of navigation
- Garcia de Orta - 16th century physician and naturalist, he was a pioneer of tropical medicine

== See also ==
- Agência de Inovação
- Higher education in Portugal
- Fundação para a Ciência e Tecnologia
- Open access in Portugal
