= TERCUD =

Portuguese research institute

TERCUD - Territory, Culture and Development Research Centre is a R&D Unit at ULHT – Universidade Lusófona de Humanidades e Tecnologias, Lisbon. It incorporates the restructured UEICSA – Applied Social Science Research Unit, registered as R&D Unit Nº 462 at the FCT - Science and Technology Foundation, Ministry of Science and Higher Education. As a follow-up to the FCT’s evaluation of R&D Units in 2003, the transformation of UEICSA into TERCUD was made possible by fusing several UEICSA’s constitutive elements: CESMU – Sociomuseology Research Centre (founded in 1993), CESU – Sociourbanism Research Centre (founded in 1996), CELC – Linguistics and Culture Research Centre (founded in 2001) and CEGED - Geography and Development Research Centre (founded in 2002). This restructuring facilitated a more focused scientific mission and explicitly promoted synergy with education, that is, with the B.A., M.A. and Ph.D. Programs in the Faculty of Architecture, Urbanism, Geography and Arts.

== Objectives ==
Following the concept that the uniqueness of natural, cultural and economic specificities are the constitutive elements of and decisive factors for the transformation of geographic space and territorial development at all scales in the context of the local/global nexus, the overall objectives of TERCUD are to design, implement and disseminate research and other scientific activities in favour of:

- holistic and participatory approach to planning, management and evaluation of spatial development in urban, rural and mixed settings;
- valorization of natural and cultural heritage of other material and immaterial components of territorial identities as local/regional development recourses in the context of the globalized economy and culture;

== Researchers ==
The multidisciplinary character of TERCUD’s objectives and activities is based on the academic profiles and professional expertise of the research staff and collaborators, both Portuguese and foreign. This group includes Physical and Human Geographers, Urban Planners and Architects, Cultural Anthropologists and Socio-Economists who work in Development Studies and have international experience in fundamental, policy, and applied research and consulting.

== Activities ==
TERCUD’s core activities are carried out by the Main Research Groups “Geography of Identities and Development”, “Sociourbanism and Spatial Planning” and “Sociomuseology”, which are composed of the teaching staff members of the Faculty of Architecture, Urbanism, Geography and Arts. The complementary activities, as well as those with strategically important potentials for the attainment of TERCUD’s objectives, are carried out by the Associated Research Groups “Natural and Technological Hazards” and "Architecture Lab", which are open to the teaching staff members of other ULHT Faculties and Schools.

TERCUD’s prime activities are design and implementation of national and international research projects, and production of publications, such as Cadernos de Sociomuseologia, Malha Urbana, e Arquitectura e Educação, evaluated by and integrated in international networks of scientific journals LATINDEX and BiblioSHS, books and other materials.

Furthermore, TERCUD organizes scientific conferences, such as GeoForum and PECSRL 2008, and other events, promotes integration of students through “Young Researcher Program” and organization of national and international fieldtrips in Geography and Urbanism, participates in cooperation schemes and partnerships with organizations, networks, and firms, as well as provides expertise and other services to the civil society.

The Main Research Group “Geography of Identities and Development” focuses on: fundamental, policy-oriented and applied research on territorial identity as a development recourse; development and application of models and instruments for participatory planning of sustainable development in different natural and social contexts; networking and partnerships in international research projects and publications in Geography and Development Studies.

The Main Research Group “Sociourbanism and Spatial Planning” carries out: research projects about urbanistic reality in Portugal and other countries, regarding both practice and university education in urbanism; dissemination and technical assistance in Portugal, in collaboration with IBAM – Brazilian Institute of Municipal Administration, to the Program Habitat – Best Practices; networking and partnerships in international research, publication and university education projects in Urban Development Studies.

The Main Research Group “Sociomuseology” is devoted to: research projects and provision of services to public and private entities in the area of integration of museological planning with local/regional development; editing of Cadernos de Sociomuseologia, a unique publication in Portuguese dedicated to museology, produced in close cooperation with Brazilian researchers; partnership with the MINOM - Movimento Internacional para uma Nova Museologia, integrated in ICOM – the International Council of Museums, UNESCO.

The Associated Research Group “Natural and Technological Hazards” is devoted to spatial analyses and identification of elements at risk (population, infrastructures, natural and cultural heritage), to application of Geographical Information Technologies in preventing and managing emergencies, and to human resources development in the area of Civil Protection for Local and Regional Development.

The Associated Research Group Architecture Lab (LABART) is devoted to the conceptualization, theoretical dissemination and architectural implementation of research, emphasising the application of ancillary knowledge of architecture in project design, and research on the specific disciplinary aspects of architecture.
