= PAIC Império SP1 =

Império SP1

General information
- Type: Unmanned aerial vehicle
- National origin: Portugal
- Manufacturer: Portuguese Aerospace Industry Consortium; EMPORDEF; Lockheed Martin
- Number built: 2

The PAIC Império SP1 is an experimental unmanned aerial vehicle (UAV) developed and manufactured by the Portuguese Aerospace Industry Consortium (PAIC) and Lockheed Martin Mission Systems and Sensors to support civilian protection agencies in the wildfire detection and maritime patrol roles.

Império SP1 was developed under the PAIC Império UAS program, which was established in July 2008 as result of the offset compensation that was part of the contract for the modernization of the Portuguese Air Force's P-3C Orion aircraft. As such, development started in April 2009 and was funded by the Portuguese government and Lockheed Martin. The program had a duration of four years and was completed in December 2012.

The development was led by the Portuguese Aerospace Industry Association (PEMAS) and is managed by X Aerosystems. In addition to these two companies, the research and development consortium includes Active Space Technologies, CeNTI, Critical Software, EDISOFT, EMPORDEF, Iberomoldes, INEGI, PIEP, Skysoft, and Tekever.

On January 24, 2014, an Império aircraft (SP1-01) executed a demonstration flight as part of a presentation about the program at the Military and Technical Training Center of the Portuguese Air Force (CFMTFA), Ota.

== Design ==
Império SP1 is of a high-wing, constant chord pusher configuration with a twin-tail boom empennage and of carbon and glass fiber and cork composite construction. It has a wing span of 5 meters, is equipped with a 3W engine of 157cc and 17 horsepower, and has as a 20 kg sensor payload capacity.

== See also ==
- Unmanned aerial vehicle

Aircraft of comparable role, configuration, and era

- AAI RQ-2 Pioneer
- Pegaz 011

Related lists

- List of unmanned aerial vehicles
