= Ibercivis =

BOINC based volunteer computing project

- ibercivis screensaver
- Developer(s): Spanish National Research Council and Ibercivis Foundation
- Development status: Inactive
- Operating system: Cross-platform
- Platform: BOINC
- Average performance: 13.936 TeraFLOPS
- Active users: 917
- Total users: 924
- Active hosts: 2375
- Total hosts: 2383
- Website: boinc.ibercivis.es

Ibercivis was a volunteer computing platform which allows internet users to participate in scientific research by donating unused computer cycles to run scientific simulations and other tasks. The original project, which became operational in 2008, was a scientific collaboration between the Portuguese and Spanish governments, but it is open to the general public and scientific community, both within and beyond the Iberian Peninsula. The project's name is a portmanteau of Iberia and the Latin word civis, meaning 'citizen'.

In April 2020, the volunteer computing platform was restarted by the Ibercivis Foundation and the Spanish National Research Council in order to screen existing drugs for antiviral activity against Severe acute respiratory syndrome coronavirus 2, the causative agent of the COVID-19 pandemic.

== History ==
Ibercivis was developed in Spain with the cooperation of the Institute of Biocomputation and Physics of Complex Systems at the University of Zaragoza, CIEMAT, CETA-CIEMAT, the Spanish National Research Council (CSIC) and RedIris. The project tasks are issued by different scientific and technological centers in Spain with the aim of creating a functional platform for volunteer-based scientific computing. The project is a European counterpart to the successful United States-based SETI@home and Berkeley Open Infrastructure for Network Computing (BOINC) volunteer computing projects.

Ibercivis' predecessor, the University of Zaragoza-based volunteer computing project Zivis, began operation in 2007, and Ibercivis itself started operating in June 2008. The Zivis project was a local volunteer computing application funded by the ayuntamiento (city council) of the city of Zaragoza. The larger-scale Ibercivis infrastructure has been used for a variety of calculating applications, including nuclear fusion research, protein folding and materials simulations. In July 2009, the Ibercivis platform was extended to Portugal following an agreement signed by the governments of both countries during the Luso-Spanish Summit held in Zamora, Spain, in January 2009. Several Portuguese institutions subsequently affiliated themselves with Ibercivis, including the Ministry of Science, the Centre for Neuroscience and Cell Biology at the University of Coimbra, and the LIP experimental high-energy physics laboratory.

In April 2020, a new Ibercivis project was launched to support researchers efforts to fight Coronavirus disease 2019.

=== Number of participants ===
At its inception in June 2008, Ibercivis had 3,000 registered users hosting its various projects. By December 2012, this figure had risen to over 19,800, distributed across 124 countries. There were around 55,000 individual hosting devices registered with the project, of which over 3,600 were active on a weekly basis.

As of April 2020, there were 917 active users and 2375 active hosts in the new inception of Ibercivis.

== Projects ==
Ibercivis was intended to run indefinitely, and is designed to run several simultaneous applications belonging to different scientific disciplines in a manner similar to World Community Grid. Users can select which projects they wish to contribute to via the project's website. As of May 2020, Ibercivis encompassed eight different active projects:

=== Active Projects ===
COVID-Phym: Screen existing drugs for antiviral activity against Severe acute respiratory syndrome coronavirus 2, the causative agent of the COVID-19 pandemic.

=== Completed projects ===
Ibercivis projects that have been completed or discontinued as of May 2020 include:

- Fusion: a star on your screen: this application helped scientists at the Research Center for Energy Environment and Technology (CIEMAT) and at the Institute for Biocomputation and Physics of Complex Systems (BIFI) perform simulations of the plasmas that will be produced in the International Thermonuclear Experimental Reactor (ITER). The ITER project, which will begin operation in 2018, seeks to make nuclear fusion power a reality, replicating on Earth conditions typically found inside stars.
- Docking: looking for anti-cancer drugs: the Docking application assisted the search for new medicines through the simulation of protein docking. The Bioinformatics Unit of the Centro de Biología Molecular Severo Ochoa (CSIC-UAM) developed a platform to allow the automatic simulation of interactions of proteins and small molecules. Its purpose was to find effective drugs to treat serious illnesses, such as cancer.
- Materials: simulation of magnetic systems: the Materials application aided physicists from the Universidad Complutense de Madrid, Universidad de Extremadura and the Institute for Biocomputation and Physics of Complex Systems in discovering how non-magnetic impurities in magnetic materials modify the properties of their transition from a magnetic state to a non-magnetic one. The knowledge of these transitions is important not only from a theoretical point of view but also may help develop many fields of technology, such as magnetic hard disks and superconducting materials.
- Nanoluz: light at a nanoscale: knowing how light reacts at a nanometer scale is a scientific challenge with important implications for the construction of new materials, development of new computing and communication systems and the improvement of technologies such as solar panels. Using the Nanoluz application, scientists at the Institute of Optics Daza Valdés CSIC investigated the behavior of light in metal nanoparticles, seeking to develop systems that could simplify medical and biological analysis.
- IberNet: let's research inside Ibercivis: with this project, researchers sought to study and represent the structure of Ibercivis as a social network and try to export their conclusions to other social networks, to help with the study and prediction of the dynamics of a mass social environment.
- Amiloide: searching for drugs against neurodegenerative amyloid diseases: the AMILOIDE project aims to search digital libraries of millions of compounds for potential drugs to interfere with the formation of aggregates and amyloid fibers, which can lead to neurodegenerative diseases. Currently, the main target diseases being studied are familial amyloid polyneuropathy (FAP) and Alzheimer's disease. This project is the responsibility of scientists of the Structural and Computational Biology Group at the Center for Neuroscience and Cell Biology (CNC) of the University of Coimbra.
- Neurosim: an immersion in the molecular structure of memory: scientists at the Institute of Matter Structure, CSIC use the results of the Neurosim application to analyze the structural properties of amino acids and small peptides (sequences of a few tens of amino acids) that act in the human brain and nervous system. By simulating the so-called energy landscape for each amino acid, key steps can be made in reconstructing the three-dimensional structure of proteins from the amino acid sequence, advancing the study of the structure and function of the human brain.
- Adsorption: behaviour of confined fluids in limited spaces: the Adsorption application helps researchers from the Instituto de Química-Física Rocasolano from CSIC study the adsorption properties of the pillared clays that are widely used as industrial catalysers, materials for gas storage, and industrial separation agents. This kind of clay is used in industrial processes such as the production of biofuels from vegetable oils, the storage of natural gas at room temperature and the storage of greenhouse gases produced by industry.
- Cuanticables: quantic wires simulations: scientists of the University of Buenos Aires use this application to study the degree to which the faults in the material of quantum wires has on their electric current. For this purpose, they develop a theoretical model which simulates the quantum wire, the impurities and the electrodes to which the quantum wire connects, and study the behaviour of the current that is generated across the wire when an external voltage is applied to it.
- Sanidad: improved diagnostics: ionizing radiation is used in health applications ranging from basic diagnostic tests in a modern hospital (in radiology, nuclear medicine and laboratory tests) to the treatment of cancer by radiotherapy. For these purposes, both actual radioactive materials (in the form of seeds or injectable material) and complex equipment that generates photon beams and electrons can be utilised. Physicists from Andalucía use the Sanidad simulations to improve knowledge of the safe use of radiation in healthcare, and to explore potential new applications.
- Criticalidad: electron transport in disordered systems with fractal properties: the Criticalidad project helps Mexican investigators understand the properties and effects of fractality in the transport of electrons through disordered systems in the Anderson transition.
- Soluvel: researching solubility of toxic and pharmaceutical compounds: the aim of the Soluvel project is to calculate the solvation energies of certain soluble compounds, so as to identify through computation which compounds may prove toxic to humans, and which may serve as effective medical drugs. The project is being conducted by researchers from the Laboratory of Molecular Simulation of Separation and Reaction Engineering (LSRE), a division of the Faculty of Engineering of the University of Porto.
- Primalidad: search for Wilson primes: a "citizen science" project open to all mathematicians, the Primalidad application searches for the next Wilson prime – the first three having been 5, 13 and 563. It is conjectured that the fourth Wilson prime must be larger than 5 × 10^{8}.

== See also ==
- Crowdsourcing
- List of volunteer computing projects
- Science and technology in Portugal
- Supercomputing in Europe
