= Elvira Fortunato =

Portuguese scientist and politician (born 1964)

Elvira Fortunato GOIH
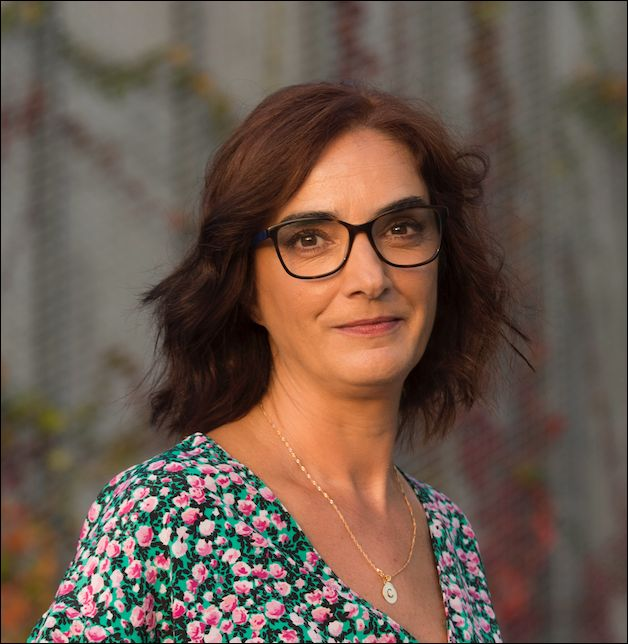
- Fortunato in 2025

Minister of Science, Technology and Higher Education
- In office 30 March 2022 – 2 April 2024
- Prime Minister: António Costa
- Preceded by: Manuel Heitor
- Succeeded by: Fernando Alexandre (as Minister of Education, Science and Innovation)

Personal details
- Born: 22 July 1964 (age 62) Almada, Portugal
- Party: Independent
- Education: NOVA School of Science and Technology
- Known for: Inventor of the paper transistor
- Awards: Blaise Pascal Medal (2016); Czochralski Medal (2017); Pessoa Prize (2020)

Elvira Maria Correia Fortunato GOIH (born 22 July 1964) is a Portuguese scientist and minister of science and technology. She is a professor in the Department of Materials Science at the NOVA School of Science and Technology and vice-rector of the NOVA University Lisbon. Fortunato is an innovator in the field of paper electronics, including transistors, memories, sensors, batteries, displays, antennas, and solar cells.

In 2022, Fortunato was appointed Minister of Science, Technology and Higher Education in the XXIII Constitutional Government of Portugal as an independent, succeeding Manuel Heitor.

== Early life ==
Fortunato was born in Almada, and received her degree in Materials Science and Physics in 1987 from the NOVA School of Science and Technology and continued her graduate studies at the same university. In 1991, Fortunato received her master's degree in Semiconductor Materials and in 1995, her Ph.D. in Microelectronics and Optoelectronics. In 2005, she obtained her habilitation in the same field.

== Career ==
Fortunato joined the faculty at the NOVA School of Science and Technology in 1995 and became director of the Institute of Nanostructures, Nanomodeling, and Nanofabrication in 1998. She led a research team that achieved acclaim for inventing the paper transistor in 2008.

Fortunato is an elected member of Academy of Engineering, European Academy of Sciences, Lisbon Academy of Sciences, and Academia Europaea. She is Associate Editor of Rapid Research Letters Physica Status Solidi, Co-Editor of Europhysics Letters, and an Editorial Advisory Board Member of ACS Applied Materials & Interfaces.

She has been the vice-rector of NOVA University Lisbon since 2017 and is in charge of coordinating the university's research.

In 2022, she was part of a group of 27 inspiring women from Europe, elected by the current French Presidency of the European Union.

In March 2022, she joined the Government of the Portuguese Republic as Minister of Science, Technology, and Higher Education.

== Research ==
Fortunato's research focuses on exploring new electronic active materials that are environmentally friendly and compatible with flexible electronics. This led to the invention of the first paper transistor in 2008, which used paper, a low-cost and flexible biopolymer, as the insulator layer (gate dielectric) of a thin-film transistor, replacing the commonly used silicon. She pioneered European research on transparent electronics, namely thin-film transistors based on oxide semiconductors, demonstrating that oxide materials can be used as true semiconductors.

Fortunato's paper electronics technology has applications that include biosensors, radiofrequency identification (RFID) tags in shipping, and product inventory management

== Honors and awards ==
Fortunato has received national and international awards for her work. In 2005, she received the prize for Scientific Excellence from the Portuguese Foundation for Science and Technology. In 2009, she was cited by the Portuguese Parliament for her research. In 2010, she was awarded membership in the Order of Prince Henry by then-Portuguese President Aníbal Cavaco Silva. In 2015, she was President of Portugal Day. In 2016, she was awarded the Blaise Pascal Medal in materials science by the European Academy of Sciences and in 2017, the Czochralski award in recognition of her research work in the area of Advanced Materials Science. In 2018, she received a European Research Council grant worth €3.5 million, the largest grant ever awarded to a Portuguese researcher at the time of the award. She was the recipient of the 2020 Pessoa Prize, recognized as the most important award of the Portuguese culture.

=== National orders ===
- Grand Officer of the Order of Prince Henry the Navigator (8 June 2010)
