= Hermínia de Lencastre =

Portuguese-American geneticist

Hermínia de Lencastre is a Portuguese-American geneticist honored by the Portuguese Ministry of Science, Technology, and Higher Education with the Medal of Scientific Merit for her contributions to microbial genetics.

== Career ==
Hermínia de Lencastre graduated in Biology from the Faculty of Sciences at the University of Lisbon in 1969, followed by a Ph.D. in Molecular Biology and Genetics from the Faculty of Science and Technology at the New University of Lisbon.

In 1990, she held the position of senior researcher at The Rockefeller University in New York, and starting from 1999, she also taught at the António Xavier Institute of Chemical and Biological Technology of the New University of Lisbon, where she retired in 2011.

== Scientific work ==
Her research focused on studying the resistance of pathogenic bacteria to antibiotics, aiming to discover how bacteria acquire it, the genetic basis behind it, and how it develops in a population of bacteria.

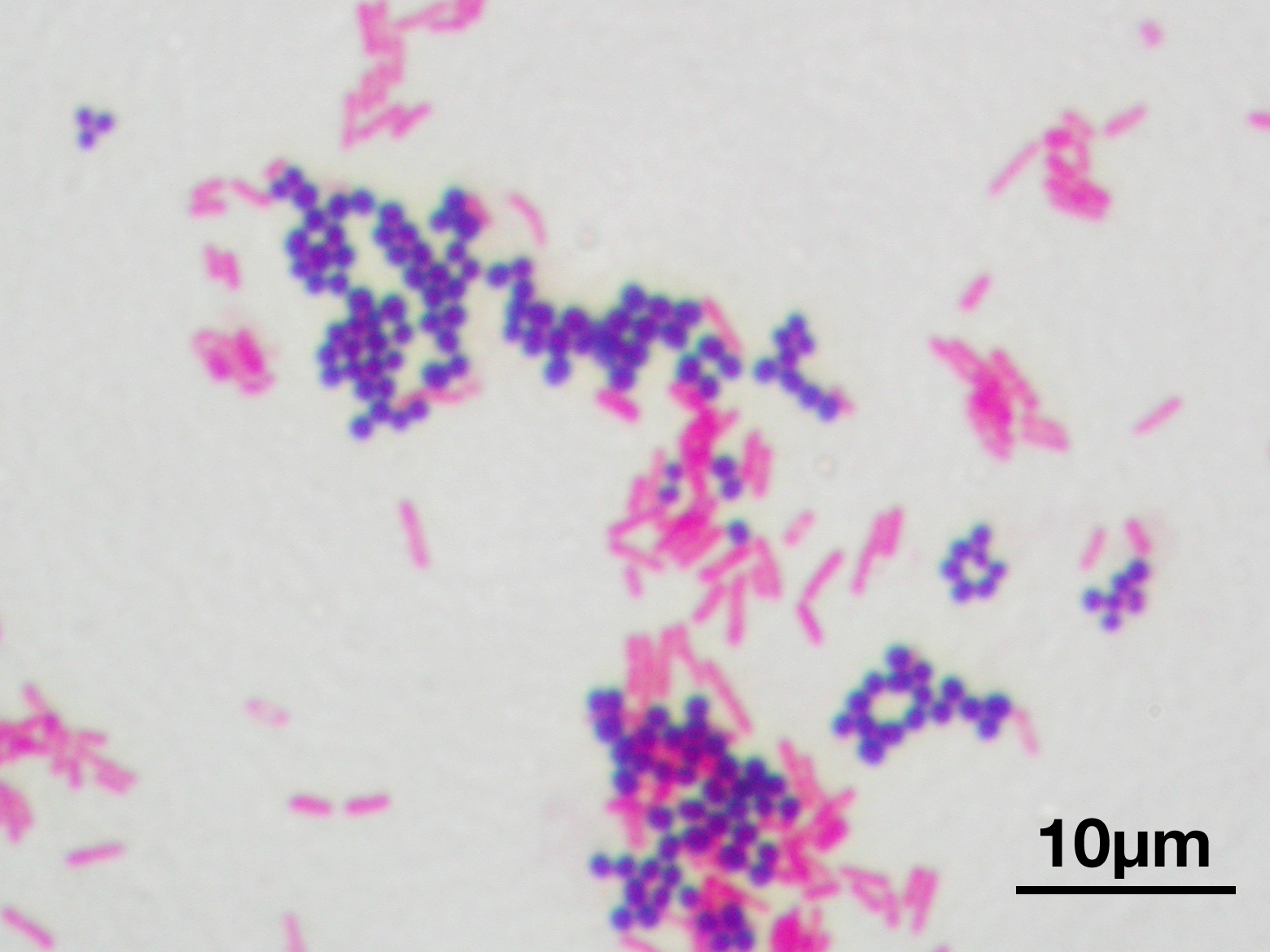
Gram-positive Bacteria (Staphylococcus aureus, in purple) and Gram-negative Bacteria (Escherichia coli, in pink)

Thus, she studied from the perspective of microbial genetics, biochemistry, and molecular biology of phagosomes and Gram-positive bacteria, analyzing their mechanisms of antibiotic resistance and the diffusion of clones and resistant genes.

She studies the leading cause of hospital infections, the Staphylococcus aureus bacteria, particularly methicillin-resistant strains, which can cause severe infections such as septic shock, sepsis, endocarditis, among others.

In 2017, the team led by her and Maria Miragaia at ITQB decoded the gene in bacteria responsible for antibiotic resistance.

== Awards and recognition ==
She received the Professor Nicolau van Uden Award from the Portuguese Society of Microbiology for her contributions to this area of knowledge.

In 2016, she was one of the Portuguese scientists honored by Ciência Viva in the first edition of the book and exhibition Mulheres na Ciência (Women in Science).

She became a retired professor at the ceremony held in December 2017 at the António Xavier Institute of Chemical and Biological Technology.

Hermínia de Lencastre was awarded the Medal of Scientific Merit by the Portuguese Ministry of Science, Technology and Higher Education in 2018.

== Selected works ==
- 2010 – Geographic Distribution of Staphylococcus aureus Causing Invasive Infections in Europe: A Molecular-Epidemiological Analysis
- 2011 – High Prevalence of EMRSA-15 in Portuguese Public Buses: A Worrisome Finding
- 2016 – The impact of private use of PCV7 in 2009 and 2010 on serotypes and antimicrobial resistance of Streptococcus pneumoniae carried by young children in Portugal
- 2017 – Evidence for the evolutionary steps leading to mecA-mediated β-lactam resistance in staphylococci
