= Open access in Portugal =

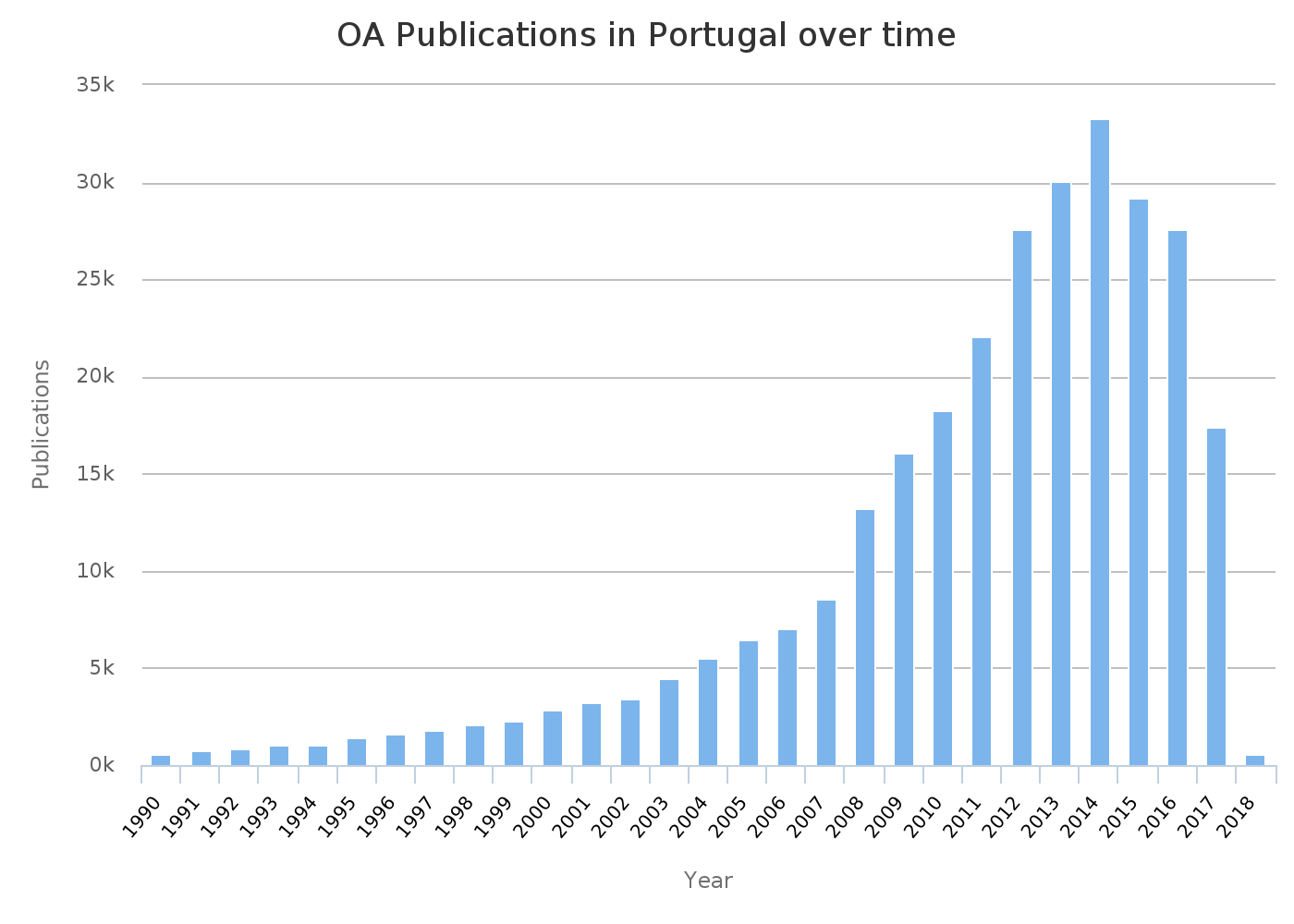
Growth of open access publications in Portugal 1990-2018

In Portugal, the first open access initiatives were carried out by the University of Minho with the creation of RepositóriUM in 2003 and the definition of an institutional policy of self-archiving in 2004. In the following years began SciELO Portugal, for the publication of open access journals, and new repositories in several higher education institutions. The Open Access Scientific Repository of Portugal (RCAAP) launched in 2008.

Following an agreement signed between the Ministers of Science and Technology of Portugal and Brazil in October 2009, the first Luso-Brasilien Open Access Conference took place in November 2010 in Braga, Portugal.

Open access policies of the country's main scientific research funding agency, Fundação para a Ciência e Tecnologia (Science and Technology Foundation, FCT), came into force on May 5, 2014.

== Repositories ==
There are a number of collections of scholarship in Portugal housed in digital open access repositories. They contain journal articles, book chapters, data, and other research outputs that are free to read.

== See also ==
- Internet in Portugal
- Education in Portugal
- Media of Portugal
- Redalyc (Red de Revistas Científicas de América Latina y El Caribe, España y Portugal)
- Science and technology in Portugal
- Open access in other countries
