= Laboratory of Instrumentation and Experimental Particles Physics =

Portuguese research laboratory

Coordinates: 38.7475172°N 9.1563626°W

The Laboratory of Instrumentation and Experimental Particle Physics (LIP) (LIP - Laboratório de Instrumentação e Física Experimental de Partículas) is a state-run Portuguese research laboratory created in 1986 under the sponsorship of the National Foundation for Science (FCT) of the Portuguese Ministry of Science, Technology and Higher Education. LIP has three main centers of activity, one in Lisbon, one in Coimbra and one in Braga. The majority of the research activities are done through international collaborations with institutions like CERN. The laboratory has about 180 members, among which are professors and scientists affiliated with the University of Coimbra, the Lisbon University, the Technical University of Lisbon, the New University of Lisbon, the University of the Minho and the University of Beira Interior.

LIP is involved in scientific research on issues related to high energy physics and instrumentation, working heavily with CERN, of which Portugal is a full member. LIP has also been involved in space science projects with NASA, the Pierre Auger Observatory, the SNOLAB, and the European Space Agency, and conducts research in Monte Carlo methods for medical physics. The laboratory is also involved in the Ibercivis distributed computing project.
