= Alberto Iria =

Alberto Iria (1909 in Olhão, Algarve, Portugal – 1992 in Paço de Arcos near Lisbon, Portugal) was a Portuguese historian.

After school in Faro he studied history, philosophy, literature and library sciences at University of Lisbon and at University of Coimbra and finished his studies in 1936 with a thesis about the history of the French Invasion by General Andoche Junot in Algarve in 1808. Thereafter he did work in the archives of the Ministry of Finance and in the National Library. A native of Algarve, he became a specialist for the history of his home region.

From 1946 to 1975 he headed the Colonial Archives (Historical Overseas Archives), together with the Ministry of Finance he organized some anniversary exhibitions and festivals. Finally he became a member of Lisbon Academy of Sciences and in 1984 also vice-president of The National Academy of History.

Iria was "commander" of the Order of the Southern Cross.
