= Manuel Heitor =

Portuguese politician

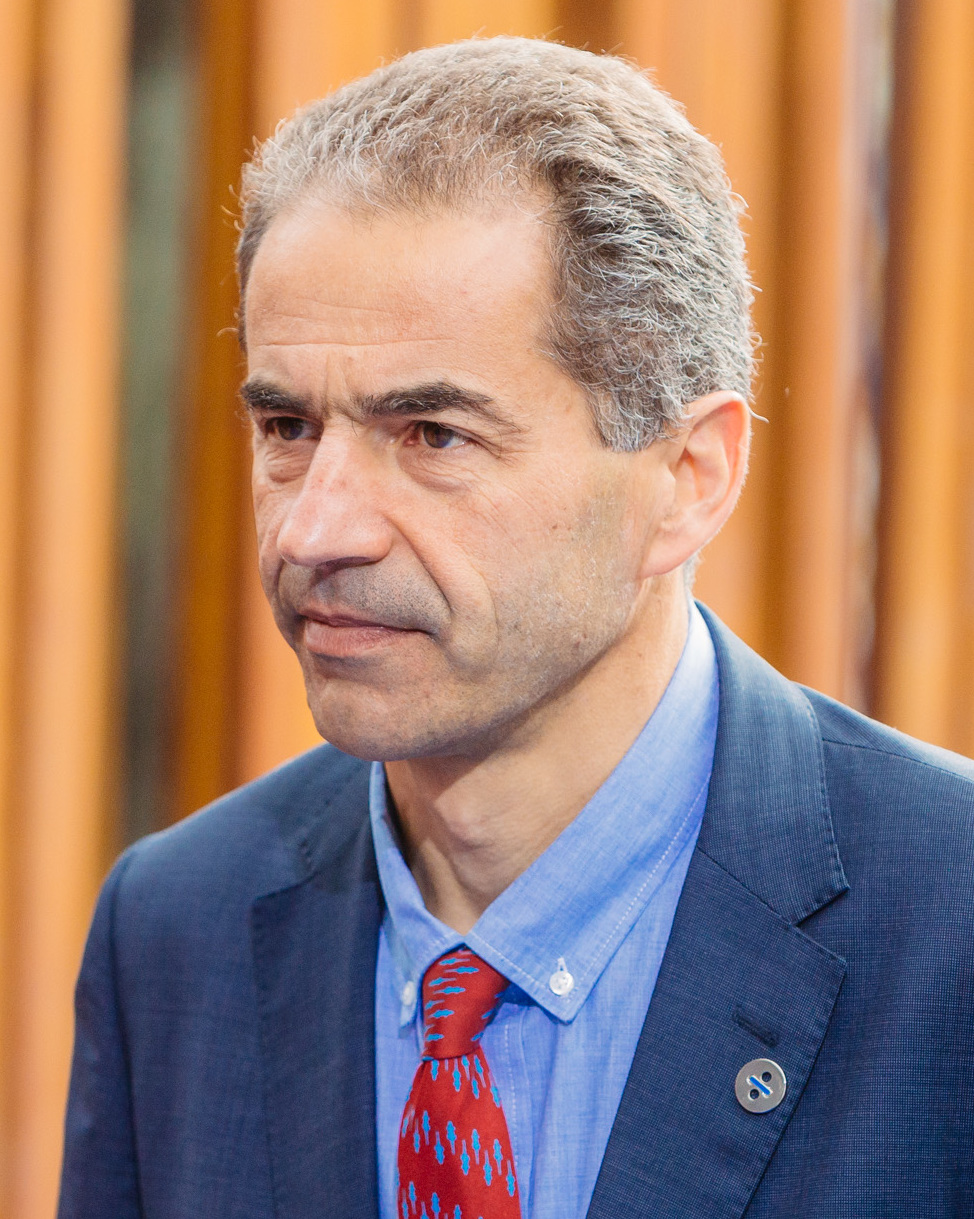
- Heitor in 2017

Minister of Science, Technology and Higher Education
- In office 26 November 2015 – 30 March 2022
- Prime Minister: António Costa
- Preceded by: Margarida Mano
- Succeeded by: Elvira Fortunato

Personal details
- Born: 1958 (age 67–68) Lisbon, Portugal
- Education: Imperial College London

Manuel Frederico Tojal de Valsassina Heitor (born 1958) is a Portuguese politician who served as Minister of Science, Technology and Higher Education in the government of Prime Minister António Costa since 26 November 2015 until 30 March 2022 when he was succeeded by Elvira Fortunato.

== Early life and education ==
Heitor graduated with a PhD in mechanical engineering from Imperial College London, and did a post-doctoral at the University of California, San Diego.

== Career ==
=== Political career ===
From March 2005 to June 2011, Heitor served as the secretary of state for science, technology and higher education under minister Mariano Gago in the government of Prime Minister José Sócrates.

During his time as minister, Heitor notably announced plans in 2018 to build an international launch pad for small satellites on Santa Maria Island and agreed with China to set up a joint research centre to make satellites on the mainland. When Portugal held the rotating presidency of the Council of the European Union in the first half of 2021, he chaired the meetings of the EU research ministers.

=== Return to academia ===
Since leaving government, Heitor has been a visiting research professor at New York University's Center for Urban Science and Progress (CUSP), and at the NYU Marron Institute. He is also a visiting scholar at Harvard Graduate School of Design.

In 2023, the Conference of European Schools for Advanced Engineering Education and Research (CESAER) appointed Heitor as its Envoy on Research Careers.

Also since 2023, Heitor has been chairing an expert group entrusted to support the interim evaluation of the European Union's Horizon Europe programme. Their report "Align, Act, Accelerate: Research, Technology and Innovation to boost European competitiveness" was published in late 2024.
