= Arquivo Histórico Ultramarino =

Archive in Portugal

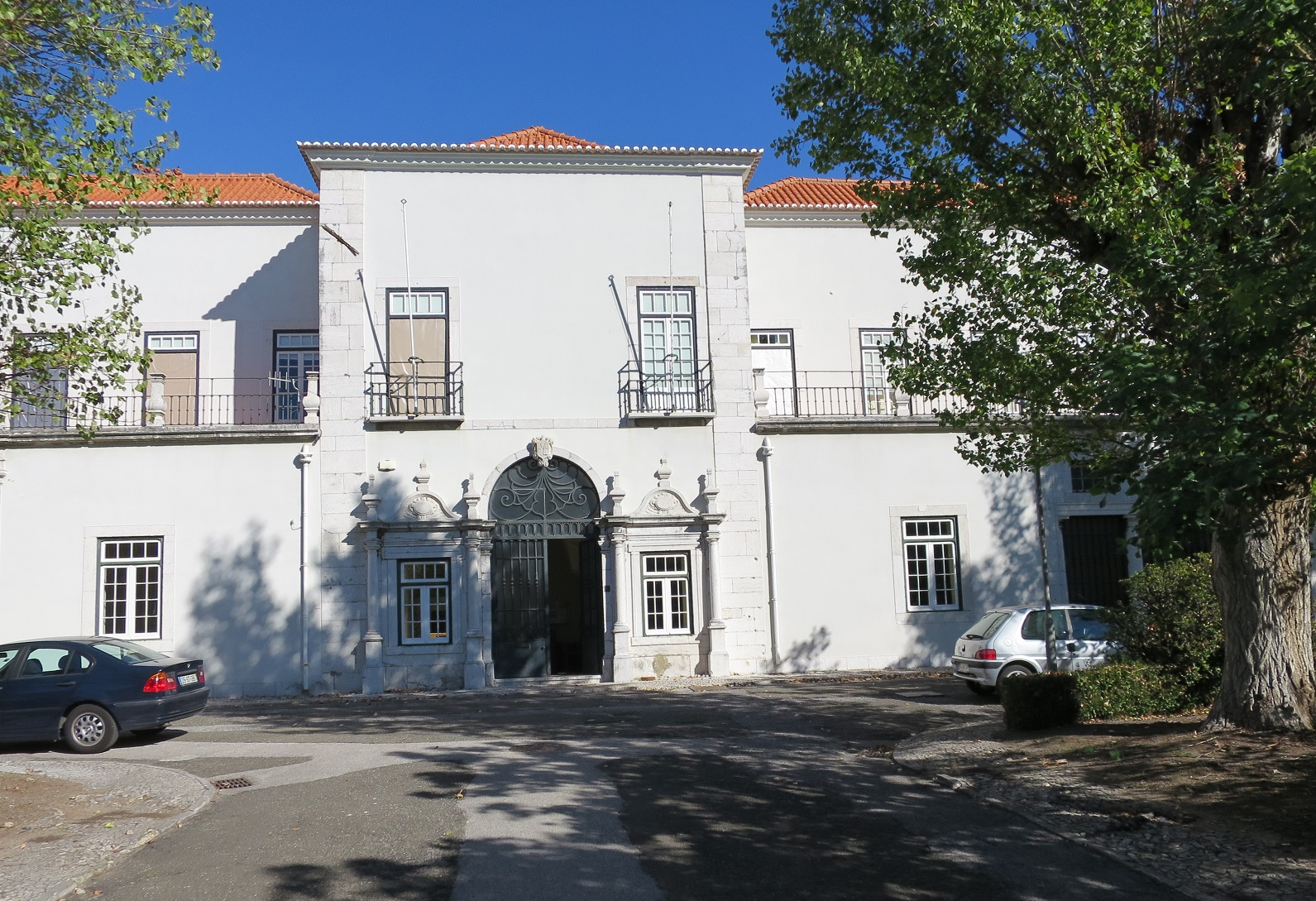
- Palácio da Ega, home of the archive
- Interactive map of Arquivo Histórico Ultramarino
- 38°42′00″N 9°11′23″W
- Location: Calçada da Boa Hora 30, Alcântara, Lisbon, Portugal
- Type: public
- Established: 1931
- Affiliation: Instituto de Investigação Científica Tropical
- Director: Ana Canas Delgado Martins
- Collection size: 65 kilometres (40 mi) of physical records
- Period covered: Portuguese Empire

Building information
- Building: Palácio da Ega
- Heritage status: Property of Public Interest
- Website: ahu.dglab.gov.pt

The Arquivo Histórico Ultramarino (AHU) (English: Arquivo Histórico Ultramarino, AHU) (est. 1931) preserves archives related to the Portuguese Empire. It is located in the Palácio da Ega at Alcântara, Lisbon, Portugal. The Instituto de Investigação Científica Tropical of the governmental Ministry of Science, Technology and Higher Education administers the archives. Prior to 1973, the Overseas Ministry oversaw it.

Among its holdings are records created in 15th–20th century related to colonial Angola, Brazil, Cape Verde, Guinea, India, Macau, Mozambique, São Tomé and Príncipe, Timor, Uruguay, and other locales. As of 1970 the materials were grouped as pre-1833, mostly from the Arquivo do Conselho Ultramarino (Overseas Council Archive) and post-1833, from the Arquivo do Ministério das Colónias (Ministry of the Colonies Archive).

Directors have included Alberto Iria (circa 1970).

== See also ==
- Instituto Diplomático, the Diplomatic Historical Archive of the Ministry of Foreign Affairs
- List of archives in Portugal
- List of libraries in Portugal

== Bibliography ==
Issued by the AHU

- Legislação Colonial
- Anuário Colonial
- Arquivo das Colónias
- Colecção dos Clássicos da Expansão Portuguesa no Mundo

About the archive

- Alberto Iria (1950). "A Organização dos Serviços do Archivo Histórico". Boletim do Archivo Histórico Colonial (in Portuguese). 1.
- Ann Pescatello (1970). "Relatório from Portugal: The Archives and Libraries of Portugal and Their Significance for the Study of Brazilian History". Latin American Research Review. 5. JSTOR 2502224.
- Jose C. Curto (1988). "Angolan Manuscript Collection of the Arquivo Histórico Ultramarino; Lisbon: Toward a Working Guide". History in Africa. 15. JSTOR 3171858.
- Roderich Ptak (1999). "Chinese Documents in Portuguese Archives: Jottings on Three Texts Found in the Arquivo Histórico Ultramarino, Lisbon". Zeitschrift der Deutschen Morgenländischen Gesellschaft. 149. JSTOR 43379288.
- Paul Bjerk (2004). "African Files in Portuguese Archives". History in Africa. 31. JSTOR 4128541. (Account of research in the AHU)
- "Carta aberta: o Arquivo Histórico Ultramarino, a democracia e o conhecimento", Publico.pt (in Portuguese), 21 March 2014 (Letter from academics against integration of the Arquivo at the University of Lisbon)
