= Institute of Molecular Pathology and Immunology of the University of Porto =

Portuguese research institution

- Abbreviation: IPATIMUP
- Formation: November 23, 2000
- Founder: Manuel Sobrinho Simoes
- Founded at: University of Porto
- Type: non profit institution
- Purpose: health sciences research

The Institute of Molecular Pathology and Immunology of the University of Porto, best known by its acronym IPATIMUP (Portuguese: Instituto de Patologia e Imunologia Molecular da Universidade do Porto), is a Portuguese non-profit institution of public utility dedicated to the health sciences research. An associate laboratory of the University of Porto, Porto, starting on November 23, 2000, it has been headed by Portuguese researcher Manuel Sobrinho Simões who was empowered with the task of founding it.

IPATIMUP's major lines of action are the prevention and early diagnosis of stomach cancer or precocious lesions, and diagnosis quality improvement of malignant neoplasia and pre-malignant lesions. The numerous published papers and important results related to gastric and esophagical cancer make this one of the (if not the) top-level cancer-related research institutions in Portugal and in Europe. But as a scientific teaching-associated institution, its main goals also are:

- Research in human pathology, specifically oncobiology (cancer);
- Training of graduate students, technicians, residents and specialists in Pathology;
- Share of scientific knowledge and teaching of undergraduate students;
- Providing sophisticated diagnostic expertise in the covered research fields covered - Pathology, Oncobiology and Population Genetics.

== See also ==
- Science and technology in Portugal
