= Crioestaminal =

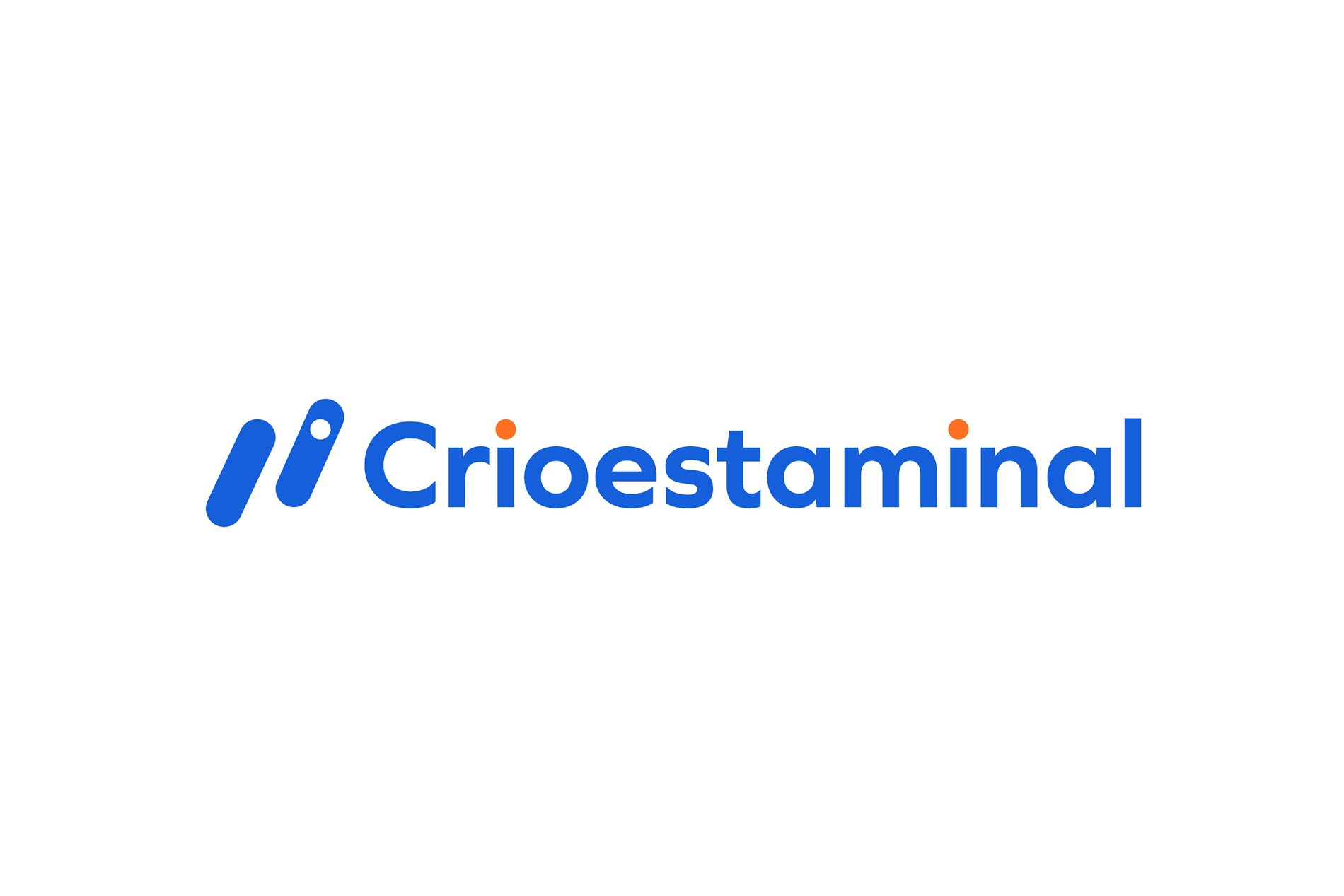
- Native name: Stemlab S.A.
- Type: Public limited company
- Industry: Biomedicine, Health care
- Founded: June 12, 2003
- Headquarters: Biocant Park, Cantanhede, Portugal
- Area served: Portugal
- Products: Isolation and Cryopreservation of Stem Cells; Production of Experimental Medicines
- Number of employees: ~60
- Divisions: Portugal: Genelab – Molecular Diagnostics; Stemlab Advanced – Cell Therapies; Lipostem – Adipose Tissue Cryopreservation
- Website: www.crioestaminal.pt
- Footnotes; ISO 9001:2018 certification AABB accreditation

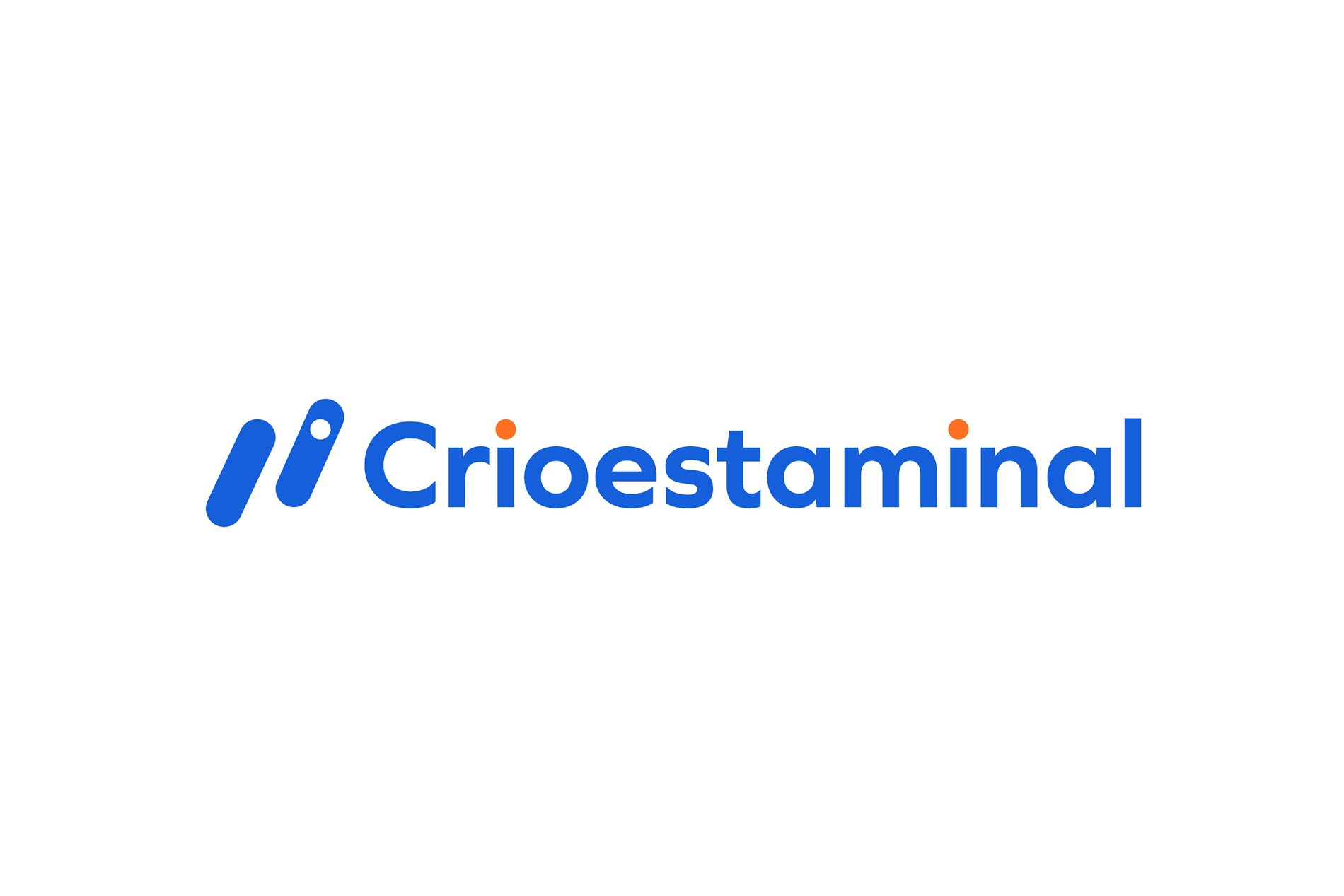
Crioestaminal logótipo

Crioestaminal - Stemlab, SA, founded in 2003, was a pioneer and is a leader in Portugal in the isolation and cryopreservation of stem cells from umbilical cord blood. Crioestaminal was the first cryopreservation laboratory authorized by the Ministry of Health, by then through the Authority for Blood and Transplantation Services (ASST) (currently the Directorate-General for Health), and the first bank to be accredited in Portugal by the AABB - Association for the Advancement of Blood & Biotherapies, for the processing, analysis, cryopreservation, and distribution of umbilical cord blood and tissue. Since 2018, Crioestaminal has been part of the Famicord Group, the largest European group of cryopreservation banks in Europe and the third largest worldwide.

Currently, there are more than 120,000 families who trust Crioestaminal, including families who initialli stored their samples in other banks such as Cytothera and Biosckin. With the closing of these companies' laboratories, Crioestaminal guaranteed the continuity of the storage of the samples belonging to those families, in its facilities in Cantanhede.

== History ==
Crioestaminal was founded in 2003 by a group of scientists from Coimbra University and professionals in the field of biological sciences.

One of the main milestones in the life of Crioestaminal occurred in 2006 with the opening of its own laboratory at Biocant Park.

Also in 2006, Crioestaminal created Genelab – Molecular Diagnostics, which focuses on diagnostics using molecular biology techniques. That same year, Crioestaminal began operations in Spain through Crioestaminal Spain, based in Barcelona, and also in Italy in partnership with a local company.

In 2007, the first transplant using stem cells stored in a family bank in Portugal took place. The sample stored at Crioestaminal was used to treat a child suffering from Severe Combined Immunodeficiency (SCID). The cord blood sample used in this treatment belonged to this child's brother and had been stored at Crioestaminal since 2003.

The year 2009 was marked by the first release of cryopreserved umbilical cord blood samples at Crioestaminal for an ongoing clinical study at Duke University in the United States in children with cerebral palsy. Two samples were sent in 2009 and three more samples in 2010 for treatment in Portuguese and Italian children.

In 2010, the Crioestaminal Group acquired the Celvitae brand, based in Madrid, thus strengthening its presence in the Spanish market. Also in 2010, Crioestaminal obtained international accreditation from the prestigious AABB, for the analysis, processing, storage and distribution of umbilical cord blood.

In 2011, Crioestaminal launched a new service that allows the cryopreservation of mesenchymal stem cells from umbilical cord tissue. It also sent another umbilical cord blood sample for inclusion in Duke University's clinical trial for cerebral palsy.

In 2013, Crioestaminal announced a project to expand its laboratory, transforming the company into the second-largest family-owned cryopreservation bank in Europe. That same year, it received the Consumer's Choice award.

In 2014, Crioestaminal was the brand with the most satisfied consumers, among 613 brands evaluated by 70 thousand consumers, revealed Consumer Choice. In that year, Crioestaminal released 2 more samples of cryopreserved umbilical cord blood in Portugal for 2 children with cerebral palsy, with one treatment taking place in the United States and the other in Spain.

2014 was marked by the release of an umbilical cord blood sample stored in a family bank in Portugal to treat a 6-year-old child with Acute Myeloid Leukemia in an autologous transplant (using child's own cells). The infusion was successfully performed at the Niño Jesus Hospital in Madrid.

By 2015, Crioestaminal had already received more than 65,000 families who had chosen it to store their stem cells. With the laboratory's expansion earlier that year, it became one of the largest in Europe with a capacity of 300,000 samples. That same year, Crioestaminal extended its international accreditation to include umbilical cord tissue, becoming the first European laboratory with dual accreditation for umbilical cord blood and tissue.

In 2016, it was nominated for the 3rd consecutive time as Consumer's Choice, an achievement that is being renewed for 11 consecutive years.

The year 2018 was marked by the release of two samples stored at Crioestaminal, this time for the treatment of two children with autism. The treatment was included in a clinical trial at Duke University in the United States. That same year, Crioestaminal expanded its laboratory again, this time with the preparation of a new unit for the production of cell therapy drugs.

Also in 2018, Crioestaminal became part of the Famicord Group, the largest European group of cryopreservation banks and third in the world, thus reinforcing its leading position in the cryopreservation sector.

In 2019, Crioestaminal released one autologous umbilical cord blood sample for hematopoietic transplantation in a Portuguese child with severe aplastic anemia. The treatment took place at the Lisbon oncology hospital.

In that same year, it acquired the entirety of the company that owned the Bebécord, Mamãs&Bebés and Bebé4D brands, the current NGI-Lifescience and Health International, S.A., reinforcing its leading position in the Portuguese market.

In the midst of the COVID-19 pandemic, in 2020, Crioestaminal opened its ATMP production laboratory, with GMP certification issued by Infarmed, having released that same year, for the Lisbon oncology hospital, the first unit of its investigational drug SLCTmsc02, obtained from the expansion of mesenchymal stem cells from umbilical cord tissue for the treatment of severe cases of graft-versus-host disease (GVHD).

In 2023, two additional samples released for infusion with autologous umbilical cord blood in two children diagnosed with autism. This time, as part of a clinical trial that took place in Bucharest at Medicover Hospital, called CORDUS.

During 2024, Crioestaminal received a new license issued by Infarmed, this time for the distribution of medicines for human use in accordance with good distribution practices (GDP) and began a partnership with the Champalimaud Foundation, carrying out the analysis, processing, storage and distribution of hematopoietic progenitors from patients undergoing autotransplantation at this institution.

In 2025, highlight is given to the release of an umbilical cord blood sample for the treatment of a child with cerebral palsy, once again at Duke University Children's Hospital, but this time with a sample from a compatible sibling that had been cryopreserved at birth.

== Famicord - The Largest European Stem Cell Bank ==
FamiCord is active in more than 30 countries, offering stem cell banking from cord blood & tissues, as well as manufacturing of ATMPs and research ans development of advanced cell therapies.

Trusted by families from 50+ nations, with over 1 000 000 samples stored securely. FamiCord operates under several local brands, listed in the table below:

Country	Brand	Website
Austria	Vita 34	http://vita34.at/
Czech Republic	Národní centrum pupečníkové krve	http://pupecnikovakrev.cz/
Denmark	Vita 34	http://vita34.dk/
Germany	eticur	http://eticur.de/
Germany	Vita 34	http://vita34.de/
Hong-Kong	Smart Cells	http://smartcells.com/
Hungary	KRIO Intezet	http://krio.hu/
Italy	Sorgente	http://sorgente.com/
Latvia	Cilmes Šūnu Banka	http://cilmessunubanka.lv/
Luxemburg	FamiCord Suisse	http://famicord.ch/
Poland	Diagnostica Bank Komórek Macierzystych	http://dbkm.pl/
Poland	Polski Bank Komórek Macierzystych	http://pbkm.pl/
Portugal	Crioestaminal	http://crioestaminal.pt/
Portugal	Bebécord	https://www.bebecord.pt/
Romania	Biogenis	http://biogenis.ro/
Slovakia	FamiCord Slovensko	http://cakam-babatko.sk/
Spain	Vita 34	http://secuvita.es/
Spain	Ivida	http://bancodecordonivida.com/
Spain	Sevibe	http://sevibe.es/
Switzerland	Vita 34	http://vita34.ch/
Switzerland	FamiCord Suisse	http://famicord.ch/
Turkey	FamiCord Turkiye	https://famicordturkiye.com/
Turkey	Yaşam Bankası Sağlık Hizmetleri İç ve Dış Tıcaret	http://kordonkanibankasi.com/
United Arab Emirates	Smart Cells	http://smartcells.ae/
United Kingdom	Smart Cells	http://smartcells.com/

== Research and development ==
Crioestaminal invests a significant portion of its revenue in developing research projects, aiming to expand the scope of therapeutic applications of umbilical cord blood stem cells. It develops several projects in conjunction with research organizations, such as the Instituto Superior Técnico de Lisboa, the Center for Neuroscience and Cell Biology of the University of Coimbra, and the Center for Histocompatibility of the center.

Since the first stem cell transplant in Portugal in 2007, 12 more stem cell samples stored at Crioestaminal have been used in clinical trials, 8 for the treatment of children with cerebral palsy, and 4 others for the treatment of autism.

As a result of its research and development efforts, Crioestaminal is the first national company to hold a patent for a stem cell-based therapy. This patent refers to a gel formulation with umbilical cord blood stem cells for the treatment of chronic wounds in diabetics, a condition commonly known as "diabetic foot". The research was developed by Lino Ferreira, a researcher at the Center for Neuroscience and Cell Biology at the University of Coimbra. In total, Crioestaminal has registered four patents resulting from three research and development projects.

Since 2005, with the creation of the Research and Development (R&D) Department, Crioestaminal has been developing R&D projects aimed at increasing knowledge and therapeutic applications of the cells it stores. To this end, it created the First Bank of Umbilical Cord Blood and Tissue Stem Cell Samples for research, with donations made by the Portuguese.

In collaboration with cutting-edge partners, Crioestaminal has developed several projects, supported by QREN, in the area of cell therapies:

- Woundcord Project: joint application of umbilical cord blood stem cells with endothelial cells in patients with chronic wounds, with the aim of improving wound healing by reducing inflammation and revascularizing the area affected by the wound.
- Injectcord Project: development of new platforms for transplantation of cells isolated from Umbilical Cord Blood, in order to allow cardiac regeneration after ischemic problems.
- Isocord Project: as part of the optimization of the isolation and characterization of mesenchymal stem cells from Umbilical Cord Tissue, this project aims to support the expansion of hematopoietic stem cells in transplant cases and neural regeneration.
- Cell Expansion: develop a method that allows increasing the number of hematopoietic stem cells from umbilical cord blood samples to ensure the viability of transplants in adults.
- Exocord Project: evaluation of the therapeutic effect of growth factors released by umbilical cord blood stem cells on the healing of chronic wounds in an animal model of diabetes .
- aDVANCE Project: development of new anti- cancer therapies.
- StrokeTherapy Project: co-promoted by the University of Coimbra and the Center for Rehabilitation Medicine – Rovisco Pais, the project aims to evaluate the therapeutic effect of CD34+ cells isolated from the bone marrow of stroke patients in the acute and sub-acute phases.
- RescueCord Project: The project aims to manufacture a new cell therapy product from autologous umbilical cord blood (i.e., the patient's own) for clinical use in newborns with hypoxic-ischemic encephalopathy. This project resulted in an authorization for treatment in a hospital exemption context, granted by Infarmed to the Pediatric Hospital of the Coimbra ULS.
- MSCellProduction Project: The project aims to demonstrate the capability to manufacture cell therapy products under GMP conditions from different tissues. The resulting products will be properly characterized, their safety assessed, quality control assured, and their potential clinical application tested.
- CellTherapy 4COVID19 Project: with this project, Stemlab intends to make available a product based on umbilical cord stem cells for the treatment of patients with severe pneumonia associated with COVID-19.

== Umbilical Cord Stem Cells and Cryopreservation ==
Stem cells, also called precursor cells or mother cells, are cells capable of giving rise to the specialized cells that make up our body's tissues and organs. This specialization occurs throughout life. Stem cells' characteristics allow them to repair damaged tissues and replace dying cells, making them crucial in the treatment of various diseases.

Among the various sources of stem cells (adipose tissue, umbilical cord blood and tissue, bone marrow and peripheral blood), umbilical cord cells stand out for their greater acceptability in the degree of HLA compatibility between donor and patient, for their lower risk of graft-versus-host disease (GVHD), a serious complication that can occur after a hematopoietic transplant, for their immediate availability of cells for transplantation and for the fact that umbilical cord blood and tissue are easily collected after birth, in a painless process that presents no risk to the mother or the baby.

Umbilical cord blood cells (hematopoietic stem cells) are already used to treat more than 80 diseases. Umbilical cord tissue cells (mesenchymal stem cells) have enormous therapeutic potential, having already been used to combat GVHD.

Umbilical cord tissue cells have different properties than cord blood cells. These cells can differentiate into cartilage, bone, and muscle, among other tissues, and are currently being investigated in the field of regenerative medicine (organs and tissues from stem cells).

To collect and store umbilical cord stem cells, a process is required that allows them to be stored for decades and used immediately by the individual or a compatible relative to treat various diseases. This process is called cryopreservation.

Cryopreservation consists of preserving cells for long periods of time, at low temperatures (-196 °C), without them losing their viability.

The first umbilical cord blood stem cells were cryopreserved in the late 1980s. With these stem cells, stability studies are conducted that demonstrate the viability of keepingstem cells cryopreserved for more that 25 years.

The only time umbilical cord stem cell cryopreservation can be performed is within 72 hours of collection at the time of birth. Collection is simple, safe, and painless. After clamping the umbilical cord, the blood is collected in a special bag and the tissue in a vial, where they are properly packaged to ensure their safety during transport to the laboratory.
