= International Portuguese Language Institute =

Institute of the Community of Portuguese Language Countries

- Instituto Internacional da Língua Portuguesa
- Formation: 1989
- Headquarters: Praia, Cabo Verde
- Official language: Portuguese
- President: Marisa Guião de Mendonça
- Website: iilp.cplp.org

The International Portuguese Language Institute (Portuguese: Instituto Internacional da Língua Portuguesa, IILP) is the Community of Portuguese Language Countries's institute supporting the spread and popularity of the Portuguese language in the world. The institute's headquarters is located in Praia, Cabo Verde.

== History ==
The institute is recent, and its statutes are still not well regulated. However, its history starts in 1989 when the countries of Portuguese language gathered in São Luís do Maranhão in Brazil to create a base for a Portuguese language community. The Brazilian president, José Sarney, proposed the idea of an international institute to promote the language. Only 10 years later in a meeting in São Tomé and Príncipe, a small island-nation in the Gulf of Guinea, the institute's objectives, implementation and location (Cape Verde) were set.

The IILP's fundamental objectives are "the promotion, the defence, the enrichment and the spread of the Portuguese language as a vehicle of culture, education, information and access to scientific and technologic knowledge and of official use in international forums".

The members of the IILP are the member states of the Community of Portuguese Language Countries – the CPLP: Angola, Brazil, Cape Verde, East Timor, Guinea-Bissau, Mozambique, Portugal, São Tomé and Príncipe, and since 2014 Equatorial Guinea.

== See also ==
- Academia das Ciências de Lisboa, Classe de Letras
- Community of Portuguese Language Countries
- Language planning
- Language policy
