= Alexandre Quintanilha =

Portuguese scientist (born 1945)

Alexandre Quintanilha GOSE
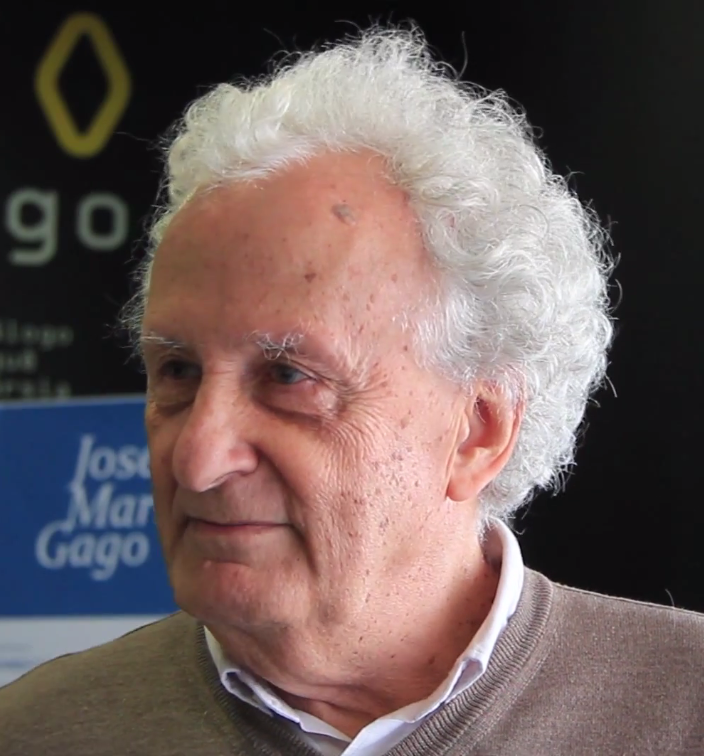
- Quintanilha in 2015

Member of the Portuguese Parliament
- In office 23 October 2015 – 25 March 2024
- Constituency: Porto

Personal details
- Born: Alexandre Tiedtke Quintanilha; 9 August 1945 (age 80) Lourenço Marques (now Maputo), Portuguese Mozambique
- Citizenship: Portugal
- Party: Socialist Party
- Spouse: Richard Zimler (m. 2010)
- Education: University of the Witwatersrand; University of Paris
- Website: Parliament Website - Parlamento.pt

Alexandre Tiedtke Quintanilha, GOSE (born 9 August 1945) is a Portuguese scientist, former director of the Instituto de Biologia Molecular e Celular (Institute of Molecular and Cell Biology) of the University of Porto and Professor at ICBAS - Abel Salazar Institute of Biomedical Sciences.

== Biography ==
Alexandre Tiedtke Quintanilha, GOSE was born in Lourenço Marques (now Maputo) Portuguese East Africa on August 9, 1945, at the time a Portuguese colony. His father, Aurélio Quintanilha, was Portuguese, from the Azores islands, and one of the first scientists to study fungi. Aurélio Quintanilha worked in Coimbra, Berlin and Paris. Alexandre Quintanilha's mother was German, from Berlin. The family moved to Mozambique in the 1940s, where Alexandre was born.

=== Studies ===
Quintanilha completed his secondary school studies in Lourenço Marques, then went to South Africa to study at university level. He completed his B.Sc. (Hons) in theoretical physics in 1967 (University of the Witwatersrand, in Johannesburg), and his Ph.D. in solid state physics in 1972 (University of Paris).

=== Work ===
Quintanilha switched his focus to biology on moving to California in 1972. He worked for nearly 18 years at the University of California, Berkeley, in the US, before returning to Portugal in 1990 and becoming director of the Instituto de Biologia Molecular e Celular (Institute of Molecular and Cell Biology) of the University of Porto.

=== Personal life ===
Alexandre is married to his longtime partner, North-American writer and journalist Richard Zimler. They met in December 1978 and began living together that same month. They married as soon as same-sex marriage was legalized in Portugal, in 2010. Since 1990 the two men have been living in Porto, Portugal.
