= Margarida Mano =

Portuguese politician

Minister of Education and Science
- In office 30 October 2015 – 26 November 2015
- Prime Minister: Pedro Passos Coelho
- Preceded by: Nuno Crato
- Succeeded by: Tiago Brandão Rodrigues (Education); Manuel Heitor (Science, Technology and Higher Education)

Personal details
- Born: 3 December 1963 (age 62)
- Party: Social Democratic Party

Margarida Isabel Mano Tavares Simões Lopes (born 3 December 1963) is a Portuguese politician who served as Minister of Education and Science in 2015. Mano has a master's degree in economics from the University of Coimbra and a PhD in management from the University of Southampton. She is a member of the Social Democratic Party and was elected to the Assembly of the Republic by the Coimbra constituency in 2015.
