= Lisbon Academy of Sciences, Class of Letters =

Lisbon Academy of Sciences Class of Letters
- Academia das Ciências de Lisboa
- Formation: 24 December 1779
- Headquarters: Lisbon, Portugal
- President: Artur Anselmo de Oliveira Soares
- Website: www.acad-ciencias.pt

The Class of Letters (Portuguese: Classe de Letras) of the Lisbon Academy of Sciences holds an official consultative role on the Portuguese language in Portugal.

It was created by the queen Maria I of Portugal, on 24 December 1779, during the Age of Enlightenment.

It is based in Lisbon. The current president of the board is Adriano Moreira.

== See also ==
- Academia Brasileira de Letras
- International Portuguese Language Institute
- Sciences Academy of Lisbon
