= Instituto Pedro Nunes =

Portuguese non-profit private organization

Coordinates: 40.192167°N 8.414164°W

Instituto Pedro Nunes (IPN) is a non-profit private organization for innovation and technology transfer based in Coimbra, Portugal. It is named after the Portuguese 16th century mathematician and professor Pedro Nunes, who lived in the city of Coimbra and worked for the local university.

== IPN profile ==
Founded in 1991, as an autonomous technology transfer centre of the University of Coimbra, the Instituto Pedro Nunes (IPN) has been one of the main links between the University of Coimbra and the business sector. Nowadays, a private non-profit business incubator, IPN work is made through partnership with enterprises, specialized training and promotion and support to tech-based spin-offs. IPN has its own technological infrastructures – six laboratories – besides accessing a network of researchers in the scientific and technological system, particularly from the University of Coimbra, mainly through the Faculty of Sciences and Technology. It also belongs to several national and international networks, including TII, EARTO, Incubator Forum and Proton (Gate2Growth). Some examples of successful technological companies born in or otherwise linked to the IPN include software company Critical Software and Magycal, thermo-mechanical and electronics engineering company Active Space Technologies and biotechnology company Crioestaminal.

== IPN laboratories and departments ==
LABGEO - Laboratory of Geotechnique: LABGEO covers the scientific areas of Geotechnique and foundations. The main services area is consulting, engineering geology and soil mechanical characterization, based on the execution of research and field and laboratory tests. LABGEO aims to contribute to a general quality improvement on the construction of Geotechnical structures, through applied research and services development in the area of Geotechnique.

LAS - Laboratory of Automation and Systems: LAS develops its activities primarily in the following fields: wearable computing and instrumentation, robotics and industrial automation, image analysis, medical instrumentation and rational use of energy and support for sustainable development.

LEC - Laboratory of Electroanalysis and Corrosion: LEC covers the areas of corrosion and of electroanalysis of trace metals or other pollutants in complex matrices, by detection in situ in real time, through continuous on-line monitoring, of inorganic or organic components of effluents or of environmental origin.

LED&MAT - Laboratory of Wear, Testing and Materials: LED&MAT deals with the following areas: coatings for mechanical applications (wear and oxidation protection), recovery of inorganic waste, powder injection of ceramic materials, new metallic alloys, selection of materials, failure analysis of in-service components, chemical analysis of solids, tribology, oxidation and corrosion, and non-destructive analysis of materials. This laboratory has also two unities: the UGRAN – Unity of Characterization and Certification of Granular Materials and the UMS – Unity for surface Modifications.

LIS - Laboratory of Informatics and Systems: LIS includes all the fields of Information and Communication Technology, namely Information Systems, Communication Systems, Databases, Intelligent Systems, Industrial Informatics, Multimedia Systems, and Interactive Training Systems.

FITOLAB - Laboratory of Phytopathology: FItolab acts on the detection and research of plant pests and diseases affecting horticulture, fruit production and forestry. It is an independent Phytopathology laboratory, supervised by researchers and lecturers of the University of Coimbra and one of its R&D units.

BUSINESS Incubator: IPN helps start-ups with technical guidance in the establishment and early stages of business development, tutorial follow-up for developing business plans, support for attracting investment and securing funding, intellectual property and legal assistance (e.g. technology transfer contracts and the registration of patents or trademarks), access to and contact with various national and international research centres, knowledge institutions and sources of funding. IPN has 6.200 m2 for business incubation and acceleration space installations. The figures are the following:

• Total firms supported: > 220 (in 15 years)

• % of firms in activity: > 75%

• Annual aggregated turnover of incubated firms (2015): > 130 million euros

• Job creation: > 2.200 jobs (direct and highly qualified)

Knowledge Valorisation and Innovation Department: provides services to researchers, students and firms in IP protection and licensing, support to spin-offs creation, technology transfer and commercialization, and appliance and management of R&D funded programmes.

== See also ==
- University of Coimbra
