= Instituto de Biologia Molecular e Celular =

Portuguese research institute

The Institute of Molecular and Cell Biology (IBMC - Instituto de Biologia Molecular e Celular) in Porto, Portugal, was founded in the 1990s as a multidisciplinary research institution in the fields of genetic diseases, infectious diseases and immunology, neuroscience, stress and structural biology.

Most of its investigators are University of Porto's faculty and many work also at the two university's teaching Hospitals, as well as other national biomedical and environmental research institutions, other public and private universities and a couple of enterprises. Bial, a well known Portuguese pharmaceutical company with headquarters in Porto region is one of that associated enterprises.

Its first director and co-founder was Alexandre Quintanilha.

== See also ==
- Science and technology in Portugal
