= Critical Software =

Portuguese software company

Critical Software S.A.
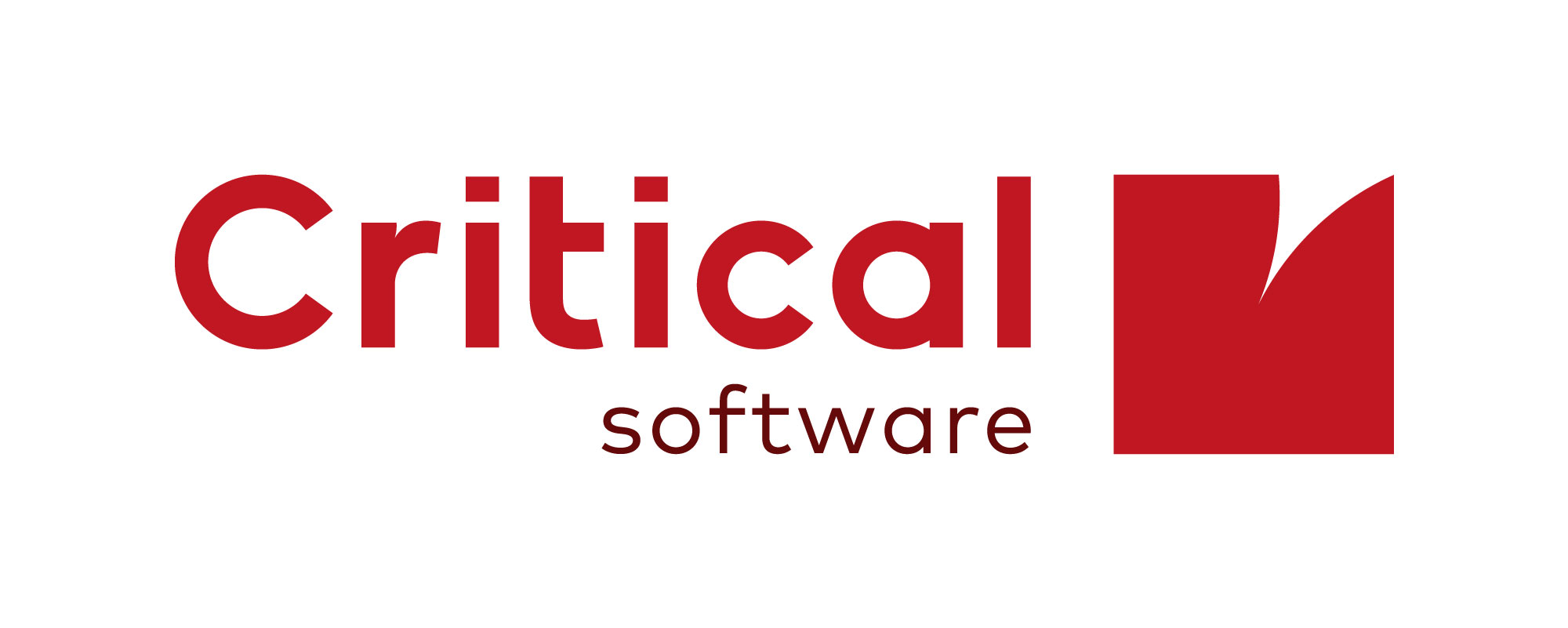
- Type: Privately held
- Industry: Information Technology
- Founded: 1998
- Founder: João Carreira; (CEO); Gonçalo Quadros; (Chairman); Diamantino Costa
- Headquarters: Coimbra, Portugal
- Products: Xception; Beyond Logistics; Oversee; WOW; SMITEn; EyeCommand
- Revenue: €58M (2019)
- Number of employees: 900+ (2019)
- Website: criticalsoftware.com

Critical Software is an international software development company, established in 1998, from the University of Coimbra's business incubator and technology transfer centre, Instituto Pedro Nunes (IPN). The company has other offices in Coimbra, Viseu, Porto, Lisbon (Portugal), Southampton (United Kingdom), Munich (Germany) and Boston (United States).

Critical Software develops systems and software services for safety, mission and business-critical applications in several markets, including aerospace, defense, automotive, railway, telecoms, finance, and energy and utilities. The company's competencies include system planning and analysis, system design and development, embedded and real-time systems, command and control systems, security and infrastructure, systems integration, business intelligence, independent software verification & validation, UxD, AI and smart meter testing.

Critical Software's delivery unit was one of the first in Europe to be rated at CMMI Maturity Level 5. The company is one of a few dozen organizations in the world which have both waterfall and agile software development units rated at Maturity Level 5.

== Critical Group ==
The Critical Group comprises a series of technology companies, many of which were formed from concepts originally developed within Critical Software.

- Critical Materials develops products that provide diagnostics and prognostics for critical structural systems. The company was acquired by the original co-founders and rebranded Stratosphere S.A.
- onCaring is a technology company that helps seniors living in long-term care across Europe, the United States, and Brazil.
- Critical Links provides purpose-built solutions to simplify the delivery of digitized content to schools.
- Retmarker provides software for screening and progression monitoring of retinal diseases.
- Critical Manufacturing provides automation and manufacturing software for high-tech industries. The company was acquired by ASMPT in 2018.
- Watchful Software provided software that kept sensitive information safe from disclosure or security breaches. Symantec acquired it in 2017.
