= International Iberian Nanotechnology Laboratory =

Portuguese research organization

Coordinates: 41°33′18″N 8°23′59″W

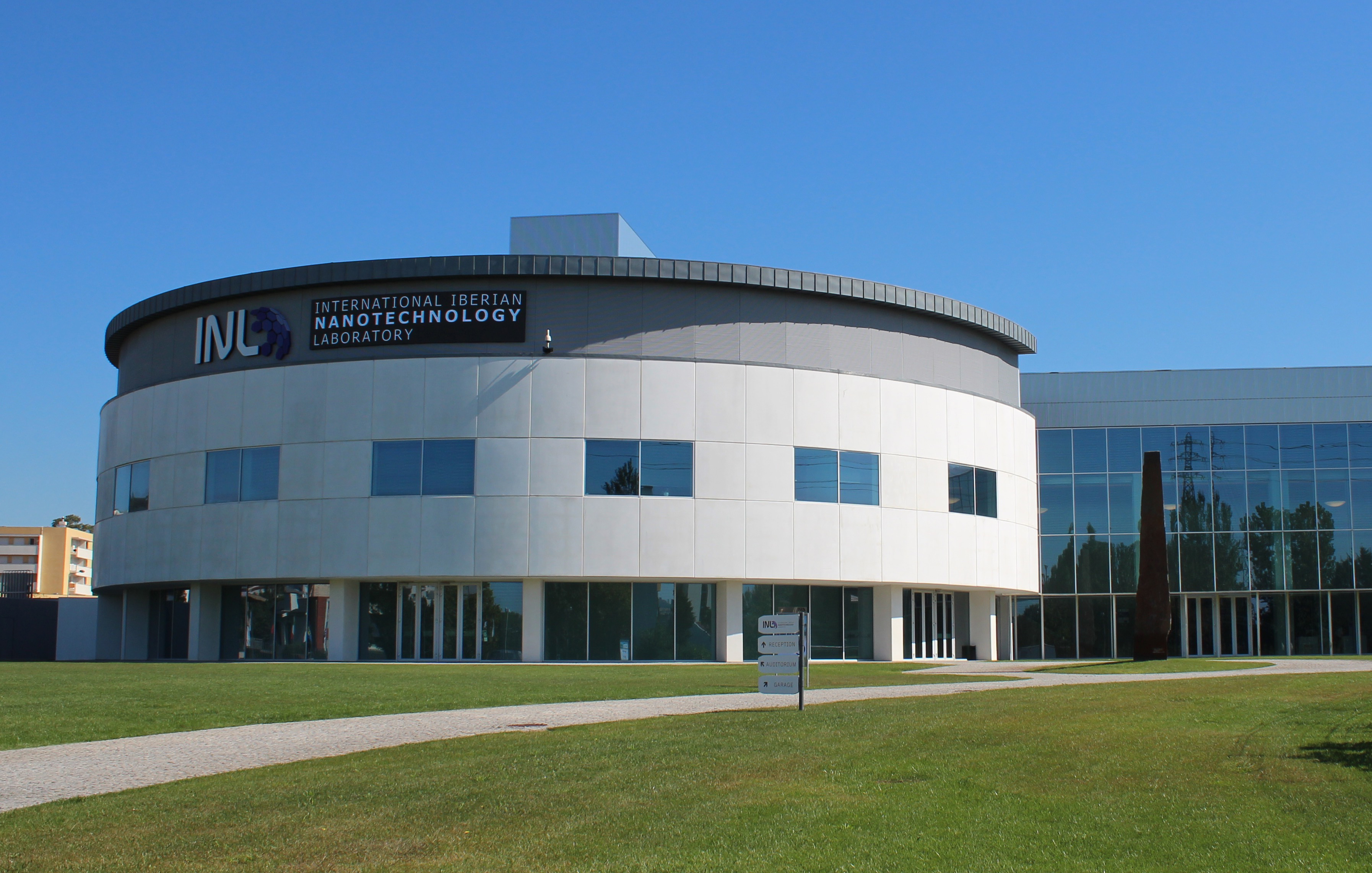
INL Building outreach presentation

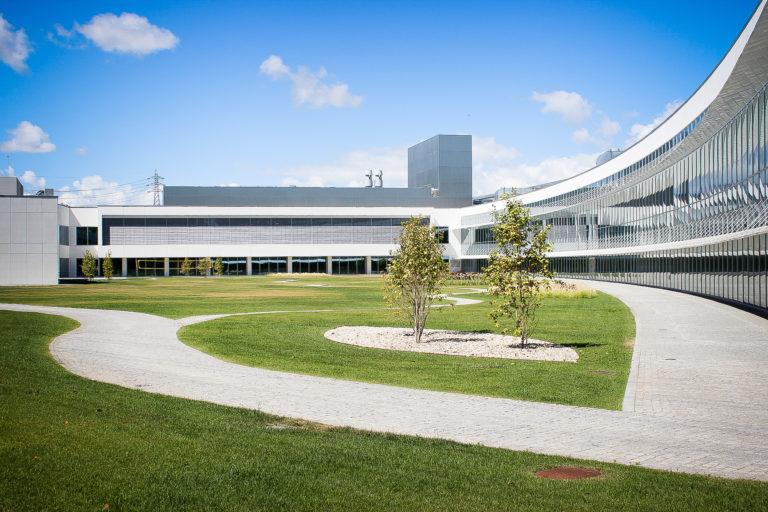
International Iberian Nanotechnology Laboratory (INL)

International Iberian Nanotechnology Laboratory (INL), in Braga, Portugal, a fully international research organization in Europe in the field of nanoscience and nanotechnology. INL is the result of a joint decision of the Governments of Portugal and Spain, taken on November 19, 2005, at the XXI Portugal–Spain Summit, in Évora. In this summit it was decided that the institute would be located in Braga, Portugal and its first director would be a Spanish researcher (Professor José Rivas of the University of Santiago de Compostela, nominated on the occasion by the President of the Government of Spain)

INL provides a research environment promoting an interdisciplinary effort in addressing the major challenges in the emerging areas of Nanobiotechnology, Nanoelectronics, Nanomedicine and Materials Science at Nanoscale. The key research activities are based on existing areas in Portugal and Spain, as well as on new strategic development areas where researchers will be hired. The Laboratory is planned for 440 scientists, students, and supporting technical and administrative staff.

INL works with international research centres, local and global industry and universities.

== INL summit ==
Since 2015 INL organizes the INL Summit. This two days event brings together participants on all areas of knowledge with a focus on the impact of nanotechnology in today's world. In the 2016 event, BeeHex introduced 3D food printing at INL's annual conference.

- Previous events:
- 2015: Scale Travels
- 2016: Nanotechnology as a key driver for rethinking food
- 2017: Nanotechnology: The new economy

== History ==
- 2005: Decision of Portugal and Spain to set up a joint R&D institution in the district of Braga;
- 2006: Signing of the International Convention with the Statutes by the governments of the two countries (November);
- 2007: Parliamentary approval of the Treaty in the two countries and corresponding ratification by Heads of State;
- 2008: Signature of the Headquarters Agreement with the Portuguese State and assignment of the land by the Portuguese State to the INL (January) and beginning of the construction of the facilities (July);
- 2009: Inauguration of the facilities (17 July);
- 2010: Beginning of scientific activities at INL's facilities (November);
- 2011: Authorization for the award of the 2nd tender for the purchase of scientific equipment (May);

== Departments ==
- Micro and Nanofabrication
- Nanoelectronics Engineering
- Life Sciences
- Quantum Materials, Science and Technology
- Nanophotonics
- Advanced Electron Microscopy Imaging and Spectroscopy
