= MINOM =

MINOM (formally the Mouvement International pour la Nouvelle Muséologie) is an affiliated organisation of the International Council of Museums. It is composed of professionals working in community museums, ecomuseums, museology institutes, groups focused on the organisation of local cultural activities, management and cultural mediation, and grass-rooted cultural institutions.

MINOM's objectives are to make communities, museologists and cultural institutions aware of present major social problems, to show their connections with heritage, to organise activities relating to cultural property and to participate as a mediator in museological debates within their communities. MINOM organizes meetings and regional exchanges.

From 2007 to 2023, its president was the Portuguese scholar Mário Moutinho. Vice-presidents: the scholars Paula Assunção dos Santos and Mário Chagas. The general secretary is Ana Mercedes Stoffel. Councillors are: Pierre Mayrand, Judite Primo and Raul Méndez Lugo. Among the honorary members are Hugues de Varine and François Leclerq.

Nowadays, its president is Aida Rechena, Portuguese scholar with studies ith enfatizais the area of sociomuseology. The vice-presidents are the scholars Emanuel Sancho and Raquel Janeirinho.
