= Biocant =

Science park in Cantanhede, Portugal

Coordinates: 40.3647682°N 8.6041222°W

Biocant or Biocant Park, is a Portuguese science park entirely devoted to biotechnology which is headquartered in Cantanhede. It is a venue devoted to advanced life sciences knowledge where technology is developed and applied creating value in business initiatives. It was created and developed through investment and partnerships of the Municipality of Cantanhede, the Center for Neuroscience and Cell Biology of Coimbra, the University of Coimbra proper and the Aveiro University. Among the most noted companies headquartered in this science park is Crioestaminal.

Biocant-led research on Quercus suber DNA, was the main theme of a front-page article published in the Portuguese version of the March 2009 National Geographic magazine. In February 2010, Portuguese Prime Minister José Sócrates was invited to inaugurate a new building in the biocant, an event which was covered by the national media.
