= Active Space Technologies =

Portuguese space technology company

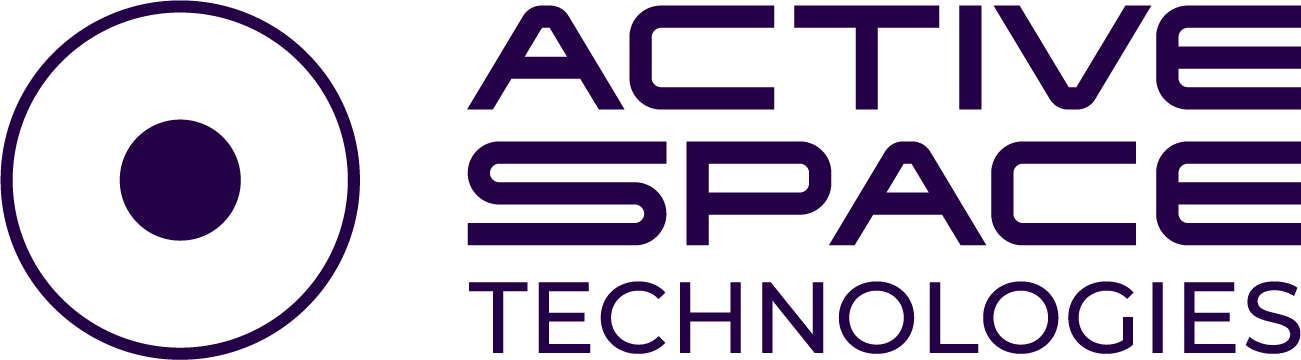
- Company type: Private company limited by shares
- Industry: Aerospace; Defence; Nuclear Fusion
- Founded: 2004
- Headquarters: Coimbra, Portugal
- Area served: Worldwide
- Products: Energy Storage Units; Small Vacuum Chamber
- Services: Thermal Engineering; Structural Engineering; CAD Design; Embedded Systems; Advanced Materials R&D; Technology Transfer
- Number of employees: 30+
- Website: www.activespacetech.com

Active Space Technologies is a Portuguese company, with main offices in Portugal, headquartered in Coimbra, which offers products and services in the fields of thermo-mechanical engineering (thermal and structural analysis, design, manufacturing and testing) and electronics engineering (embedded systems and digital control), as well as providing management support services for technology transfer and development projects (project management, systems engineering and project coordination). The company operates in the global markets of aerospace, defence, automotive and nuclear fusion, and also in scientific sectors. In addition to its offices in Coimbra and Lisbon, it has others in Southampton (United Kingdom) and Noordwijk (The Netherlands).

== Milestones ==
- In August 2015, Active Space Technologies made equipment for NASA.
- In October 2008, Bruno Carvalho, CEO of Active Space Technologies, was awarded the 2nd edition of Young Professionals Entrepreneurship Prize while he attended the International Astronautical Congress (IAC) in Glasgow.
- In July 2008, Active Space Technologies become a member of AFIA, the Portuguese Association of Automotive Suppliers.
- In November 2007, Active Space Technologies opened, through a joint venture with local entrepreneurs, its German associate company (Active Space Technologies GmbH).
- In June 2007, Active Space Technologies was given the “Young Entrepreneur of the Year” award by the Portuguese National Association of Young Entrepreneurs (ANJE).
- In March 2007, Active Space Technologies agreed to provide 6 engineer-months of structural engineering support to the Mars Gravity Biosatellite, a project jointly run by MIT and Georgia Tech.
- In November 2006, Active Space Technologies was granted a contract to provide expertise to nuclear fusion project ITER.
- In May 2006, following its expansion strategy, Active Space Technologies moved into a new office in the Instituto Pedro Nunes (IPN), University of Coimbra's business incubator and technology transfer centre.
