= Agência Nacional de Inovação =

Portuguese government agency

The Agência Nacional de Inovação (National Innovation Agency) was a Portuguese government agency funded by the Ministry of Science, Technology and Higher Education and the Ministry of the Economy and Innovation. The agency tries to promote innovation and technological development and to facilitate cooperation between research and industry.

== See also ==
- Science and technology in Portugal
