= Lisbon Academy of Sciences =

Portuguese scientific academy

Academy of Sciences of Lisbon
- Academia das Ciências de Lisboa; GCSE
- Formation: 24 December 1779; 246 years ago
- Headquarters: Lisbon, Portugal
- Official language: Portuguese
- Academy President: José Luís Cardoso
- Secretary-General: Manuel Lopes Porto
- Website: acad-ciencias.pt

The Academy of Sciences of Lisbon (Portuguese: Academia das Ciências de Lisboa) is Portugal's national academy dedicated to the advancement of sciences and learning, with the goal of promoting academic progress and prosperity in Portugal. It is one of Portugal's most prestigious scientific authorities and the official regulator of the Portuguese language in Portugal, through its Class of Letters.

== History ==
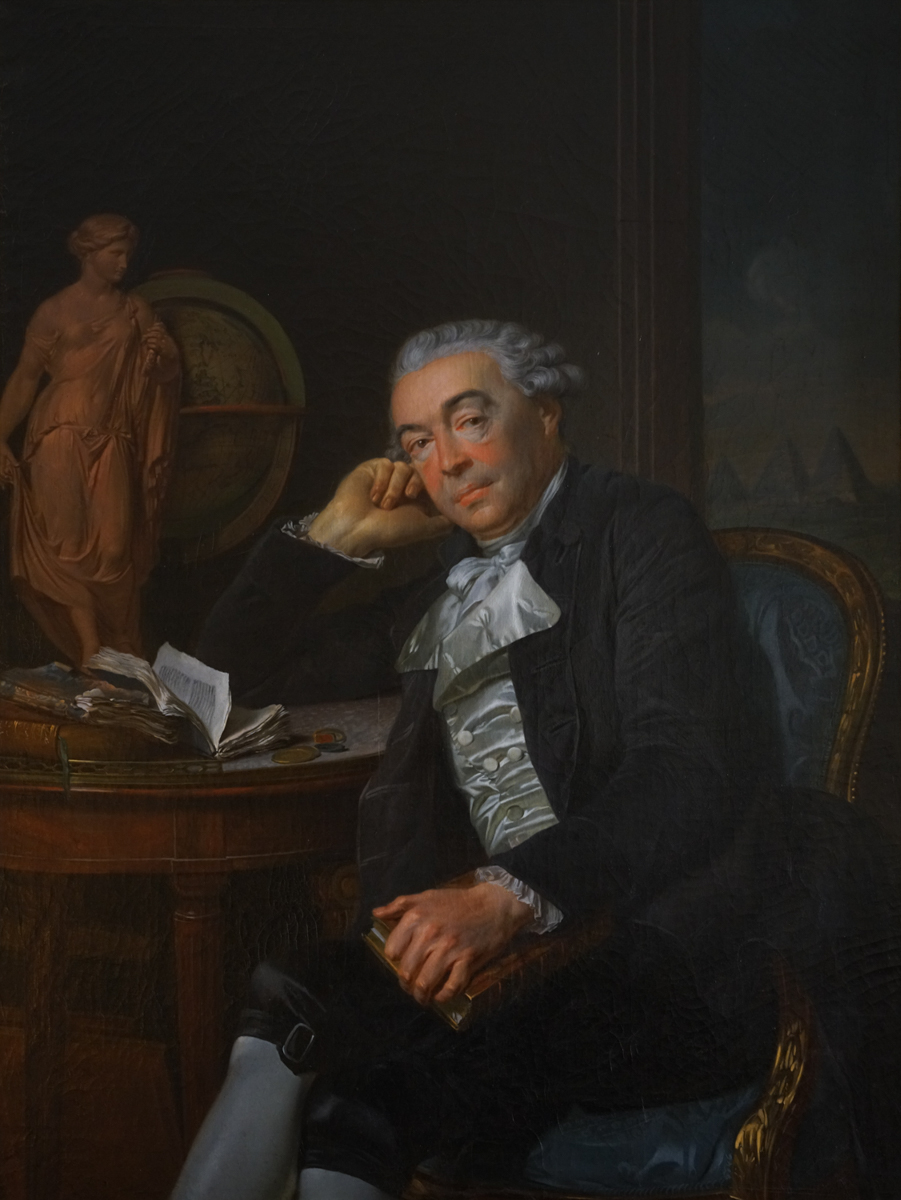
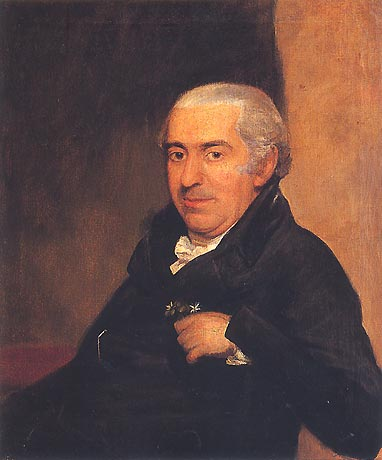
João Carlos de Bragança, 2nd Duke of Lafões (left) and José Correia da Serra (right) founded the Lisbon Academy of Sciences in 1779, under the patronage of Queen Maria I of Portugal.

The academy was founded on 24 December 1779 in Lisbon, Portugal, by João Carlos de Bragança, Duke de Lafões, who served as the academy's first President, and José Correia da Serra, who served as its first secretary-general. Domenico Vandelli was among its mentors and early organizers.

It inherited several archives from its direct predecessor the Royal Academy of Portuguese History (Academia Real da História Portuguesa), which had been functioning since 1720 and stopped in 1776. This society had been meeting informally since 1717, under the sponsorship of the 4th Count of Ericeira, until its approval by King John V and receiving royal patronage.

The academy received royal patronage under Queen Maria I of Portugal in 1783, bestowing the title of Royal Academy of Sciences (Real Academia das Ciências) unto the institution.

The seat of the academy in Lisbon has been located in the Bairro Alto district of Lisbon since 1834.

== Organization ==
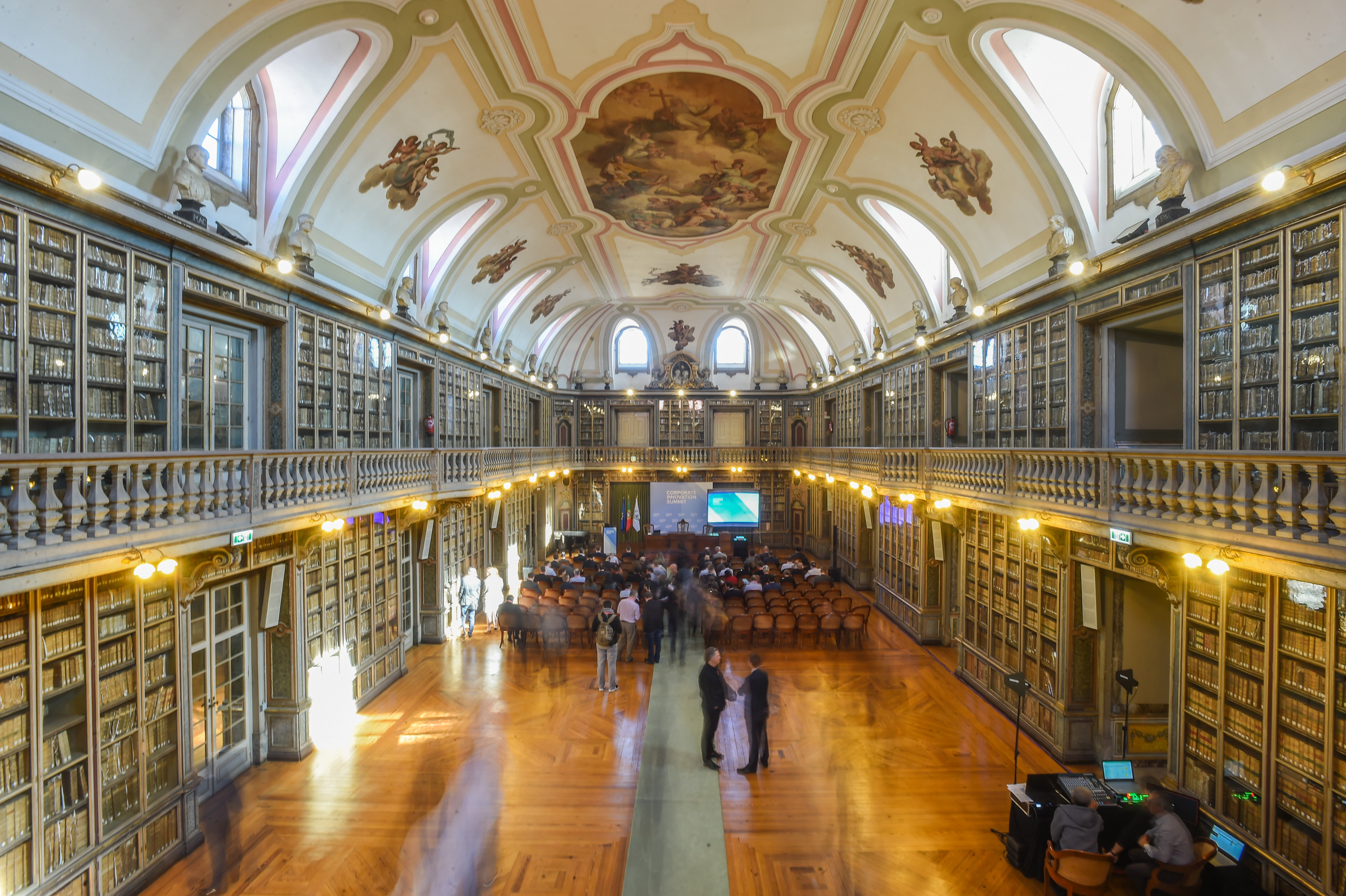
Library of the Lisbon Academy of Sciences

The academy has two classes: the Class of Sciences and the Class of Letters, and each has 30 full members and 60 corresponding members distributed in six sections. It also has a number of foreign members.

The academy was one of the first national members of the International Council for Science, is one of two Portuguese members of the European Science Foundation and is the Portuguese partner of the European Science Exchange Programme of The Royal Society (United Kingdom).

== Library ==
The Library of the Academy of Sciences of Lisbon is one of the most important libraries in Portugal, resulting from the union of the collection of the Academy of Sciences of Lisbon with that of the Library of the Convent of Jesus, given by the State to the Academy, after the extinction of religious orders in 1834, together with the convent building. The Library was particularly enriched by numerous rare works acquired during the period in which it was under the responsibility of Friar Manuel do Cenáculo. When in 1777, he occupied the bishopric of Beja, the Library served to support the activities of the Aula Maynense, created by Father Joseph Mayne in 1792, in collaboration with the Academy, founded in 1779.

The library is rich in scientific works by authors such as Kepler, Newton, Linnaeus, Buffon, and many other renowned authors, as well as works of philosophy, theology, literature, and art, including incunabula, manuscripts (approximately 3,000 copies), periodicals, an invaluable collection of rare books from the 14th to 16th centuries, among others, totaling approximately 1,000,000 items. The library also holds the largest collection of Arabic manuscripts in Portugal, with approximately 80 items, all accessible online through the Library website.

== See also ==
- Lisbon Academy of Sciences, Class of Letters
- Culture of Portugal
- Science and technology in Portugal
