= Centre for Neuroscience and Cell Biology =

Nonprofit research institute

Coordinates: 40.2086843°N 8.4241978°W

The Centre for Neuroscience and Cell Biology
- Type: Research Institute
- Location: Coimbra, Portugal
- President: João Ramalho-Santos
- Affiliations: University of Coimbra

The Centre for Neuroscience and Cell Biology (CNC) is a nonprofit research institute founded in 1990, aiming to foster research in biomedicine and biotechnology and multidisciplinary graduate teaching at the University of Coimbra. CNC was the first established “Laboratório Associado” in Portugal, and it has steadily increased the scope of scientific competencies over the years, with a strong focus on the exploitation of the fundamental mechanisms of aging and brain diseases.

Centre for Neuroscience and Cell Biology logo

To cope with the main expected societal impact of biomedical research a strong integrative effort was made to link the CNCs basic research achievements to the biotechnology and applied research, and to the regional economical and productive tissue. The strong partnership developed between CNC and the Clinical Faculty allows for the translation of basic knowledge into clinical applications, enhanced by partnerships with the pharmaceutical industry. As a founding partner of Biocant - Biotechnology Innovation Centre, and of the Health Cluster Portugal, CNC shows a clear commitment towards promoting technology transfer and the creation of novel biomedical and biotechnology enterprises. In parallel to fundamental and applied research, CNC is committed to the training of a new generation of researchers and clinicians. CNC established an international PhD Programme in 2002, and strongly collaborates with the MIT-Portugal PhD Program. CNC is part of the European Neuroscience Campus Network (ENC-Network) for postgraduate training, the Network of European Neuroscience Institutes (ENInet), and is also involved in the Harvard Medical School-Portugal Program in Translational Research and Information. As a research institution where the scientific challenges arise, the CNC has also the responsibility of developing and establishing strategies that foster positive attitudes towards science and scientists. The Outreach Programme developed by CNC is of utmost relevance to the dissemination of scientific information to the community, to broaden the public’s access to science, and to engage students in science studies. CNC researchers come from three faculties of the University of Coimbra: the Faculties of Medicine, Pharmacy, and Science and Technology at the University of Coimbra. It is also linked to the University Hospitals of Coimbra (HUC) and several pharmaceutical companies. As a founding partner of the biotechnology association Biocant, the CNC has shown its commitment to foster technology transfer and the creation of novel biomedical and biotechnology enterprises.

== Research ==
=== Overview ===
The core scientific activity of CNC is the study of the molecular basis of neurodegenerative processes common to ageing, neurodegenerative disorders, cerebral ischaemia and epilepsy. In parallel, the research groups explore mechanisms of neuroprotection and regeneration, which may be future candidates for the development of potential therapeutic strategies to manage these disorders. This core activity is complemented by supporting areas which also develop their own research activity, opening the scope of intervention of CNC in the biomedical field, while providing novel lines of research applicable to Neuroscience, namely: genetic screening of diseases; structure-function relation of proteins with biomedical or biotechnological interest; development of new vectors for delivery of drugs and genetic material; development of biomaterials for stem cell-based therapeutics; study of drug and disease-induced cell dysfunction, with particular expertise in processes involving mitochondrial dysfunction and free radicals; intermediate metabolism and diabetes; cellular and developmental biology, whose programs focused on human infertility, disruption of human cell function in cancer, contact dermatitis, osteoarthritis, autoimmune disease, obesity and pathogens biology, involve close partnerships with clinicians at Coimbra University Hospital Centre (CHUC) and Coimbra Portuguese Institute of Oncology (IPO); microbiology with emphasis on the strategies for adaptation of microorganisms to extreme environments, the screening and development of new anti-mycobacterial drugs and the susceptibility to legionella and fungal infection.

Translational research, organized as an Inter-Institutional Research Programme, involves Hospitals, Pharmaceutical Companies and Biocant - Biotechnology Innovation Centre. Development of new technologies based on solid fundamental research, and stimulated by the growing interest in translational research, led to reorganization of the services sector and to the creation of a technology transfer unit at Biocant, the UC-BIOTECH. The promotion of technology transfer and the creation of novel biomedical and biotechnology enterprises is one of the aims of CNC at Biocant.

The CNC was the first Associated Laboratory in Portugal, and is part of the Network of European Neuroscience Institutes (ENI). Since the mid-2000s, it has been involved in research collaborations between the Portuguese Government and the Massachusetts Institute of Technology (MIT) and Harvard Medical School (HMS).

=== Research Areas ===
The Centre for Neuroscience and Cell Biology is uniquely placed to take a decisive lead in Biomedicine at both basic and applied levels, due to the diverse backgrounds of its researchers. The close interaction with large scale hospitals, namely the Coimbra University Hospital (CHUC) and Coimbra Portuguese Institute of Oncology (IPO), Pharmaceutical Companies and the Biotechnology Innovation Centre – Biocant, is a driving force in promoting the development of translational research.

Development of new technologies based on solid fundamental research, and stimulated by the growing interest in translational research, led to the official establishment of the Biotechnology specialization domain at CNC, reorganized as such at the CNC/UC-BIOTECH located at Biocant.

Research at CNC is therefore organized in two domains – Biomedicine and Biotechnology –, each subdivided in three scientific areas.

== Education ==
Education at the CNC focuses on Graduate training in the Molecular Life Sciences and Disease, particularly in the fields of Cellular and Molecular Biology, Neuroscience and Biotechnology. The aim is to provide Master and PhD students with a multi-layered education, through programs with a strong international component.

=== Doctoral Programme in Experimental Biology and Biomedicine (PDBEB) ===
The PDBEB is an International Doctoral Programme established by the CNC since 2002, providing advanced, multidisciplinary, research-oriented training in emerging areas of modern Biology and Biomedicine.

For more information check PDBEB website:https://web.archive.org/web/20160531024341/http://beb.cnbc.pt/

=== Erasmus Mundus Graduate Programmes ===
As a member of the European Neuroscience Campus Network (ENC-Network) the CNC participates in the Erasmus Mundus Joint Doctorate, EMJD. Courses organized in the PDBEB Programme are available to all ENC students, with a focus on the Core Neuroscience Module, which cover CNC research expertise in this area, leading to possible joint PhD Projects with other Network partners.

Recently the European Masters Programme NEURASMUS was also established with the CNC as a founding partner.

For more information check here: https://web.archive.org/web/20160610100209/http://www.cnbc.pt/graduate/graduate03.asp

=== Other Graduate Programmes ===
CNC also collaborates with:

Doctoral Programme in Health Sciences, coordinated by the Faculty of Medicine, University of Coimbra

Inter-University Doctoral Programme on Ageing and Degeneration of Complex Biological Systems, coordinated by the University of Coimbra, University of Lisbon, and University of Minho

Doctoral Programme in Biosciences, coordinated by the Faculty of Sciences and Technology, University of Coimbra

Master Programme in Cell and Molecular Biology, coordinated by the Faculty of Sciences and Technology, University of Coimbra

Master Course in Biomedical Research, coordinated by the Faculty of Medicine, University of Coimbra

=== The ENC-Network ===
The ENC-Network is a network organization of Neuroscience Centres in Europe (and Canada) with the aim to organize – and formalize – research collaborations, to collaborate on grant acquisition strategies and to create exchange opportunities at all levels of education and professional work.

== Technology Transfer ==
Translational research and technology transfer have progressively been developed in CNC leading to a promising interaction with Industry and local authorities. The outcome of this interaction was the participation of CNC as a founding member of ABAP (an Association involving seven Municipal Councils of the Centre Region of Portugal) aiming at knowledge based development. The main contribution of CNC for that goal was the creation of the technology transfer unit (Biocant) in collaboration with Cantanhede Municipal Council. This unit became the anchor of Biocant Park a Biotechnology Park that is rapidly growing by attracting new Biotechnology companies.
Biocant is a non-profit association aiming of the transfer of the technology and human resources in the Biotechnology Area. The founding partners of this association are CNC (Cantanhede Municipal Council) and ABAP.

Biocant started to operate in September 2005, under the scientific supervision of Prof. Carlos Faro (Univ. Coimbra). Each of Biocant’s research units proceeded during 2006 the development of projects in collaboration with industry (pharmaceutics, wine, cork). Investigators from CNC were invited to integrate the research teams responsible for those projects. Biocant is presently organized into seven main functional units with highly qualified teams and state of art equipment: Genomics, Cellular Biology, Molecular Biotechnology, Microbiology, Bioinformatics, System Biology, Tissue Engineering, and Advanced Services. Biocant provides services and R&D activities based on post-genomic platforms such as whole-genome sequencing, DNA chips, proteomics, interactomics and metabolomics. For more information visit Biocant´s website: https://web.archive.org/web/20160717150549/http://www.biocant.pt/

== Science Communication ==
The Science Communication Office of CNC is responsible for communicating CNC's scientific work to the public through cultural, textual, and visual media. It aims to foster a social appropriation of science, contextualized to the different perspectives of CNC's extra/intra/interdisciplinary audiences.

The office communicates on a macro level through:

- Public relations with regional, national, and international media, in coordination with the University of Coimbra Press Office.
- The internet (social media, CNC website, email), schools, associations, science centers, university institutions, and local science communication events inserted in national strategies (of Ciência Viva - National Agency for Scientific and Technological Culture, and Portuguese Society of Neurosciences) or international strategies (Dana Foundation and Federation of European Neuroscience Societies).

The office also communicates on a micro level within the CNC research community.

More information: https://web.archive.org/web/20160811001039/http://www.cnbc.pt/outreach/outreach00.asp
