= Ministry of Science, Technology and Higher Education =

Government ministry of Portugal

- Ministério da Ciência, Tecnologia e Ensino Superior

Ministry overview
- Formed: 1995
- Jurisdiction: Government of Portugal
- Minister responsible: Elvira Fortunato, Minister of Science, Technology and Higher Education

The Ministry of Science, Technology and Higher Education (Portuguese: Ministério da Ciência, Tecnologia e Ensino Superior or MCTES) was a Portuguese government ministry dedicated to the design, development, execution and assessment of the science, technology and higher education national policy. Its official address was the Palácio das Laranjeiras in Lisbon. The rest of the education system fell within the scope of the Ministry of Education. Its last minister was Elvira Fortunato, aided by Pedro Nuno Teixeira as secretary of State of Higher Education.

== Powers ==
The MCTES' main powers are creating, executing and assessing the science, technology and higher education national policy, but it has many other powers, among them, governing the General Directorate of Higher Education (Direção-Geral do Ensino Superior), tutelage over the public higher education institutions, and tutelage and oversight over the Fundação para a Ciência e Tecnologia and the Macau Scientific and Cultural Centre.

The MCTES co-governs (with other Ministries and within its scope) the General Secretariat for Education and Science (Secretaria-Geral da Educação e Ciência), the General Inspectorate of Education and Science (Inspeção-Geral da Educação e Ciência), and the Directorate-General for Education and Science Statistics (Direção-Geral de Estatísticas da Educação e Ciência) and has co-tutelage and co-oversight of the Institute of Financial Management of Education (Instituto de Gestão Financeira da Educação) and the Agência Nacional de Inovação.

The MCTES has legal influence over the National Agency for Management of the Erasmus+ Programme, the Lisbon Academy of Sciences and observes the work done by Portugal Space, the Agency for Clinical Research and Biomedical Innovation's (Agência para a Investigação Clínica e Inovação Biomédica), and all state laboratories.

The MCTES can consult two national boards, the Education National Board and the Science, Technology and Innovation National board.

== List of ministers ==
No.	Name	Term of office			Prime Minister	Party
1	Mariano Gago	28 October 1995	6 April 2002	6 years, 160 days	António Guterres	Independent
2	Pedro Lynce	6 April 2002	6 October 2003	1 year, 183 days	José Manuel Barroso	Social Democratic Party
3	Maria da Graça Carvalho	6 October 2003	12 March 2005	1 year, 157 days	José Manuel Barroso, Pedro Santana Lopes	Social Democratic Party
-	Mariano Gago	12 March 2005	20 June 2011	6 years, 100 days	José Sócrates	Independent
Note: During the two Pedro Passos Coelho governments, this Ministry was merged back with the Ministry of Education, under the name the Ministry of Education and Science.
4	Manuel Heitor	26 November 2015	30 March 2022	6 years, 124 days	António Costa	Independent
5	Elvira Fortunato	30 March 2022	2 April 2024	2 years, 3 days	António Costa	Independent
Note: During the Luís Montenegro government, this Ministry was merged back with the Ministry of Education, under the name the Ministry of Education, Science and Innovation.

== See also ==
- Fundação para a Ciência e Tecnologia
- Arquivo Histórico Ultramarino
- Ministry of Higher Education, Science and Technology (disambiguation): Some countries had a ministry formerly with both of these names
