= Foundation for Science and Technology (Portugal) =

Public agency in Portugal

- Fundação para a Ciência e a Tecnologia

Agency overview
- Jurisdiction: Government of Portugal
- Agency executive: Helena Pereira, President
- Parent agency: Ministry of Science, Technology and Higher Education
- Website: www.fct.pt

The Foundation for Science and Technology (Portuguese: Fundação para a Ciência e a Tecnologia; FCT) is an organization within the Ministry of Science, Technology and Higher Education in Portugal which evaluates and funds scientific research activities, in particular in the areas of natural sciences, exact sciences, social sciences and humanities. FCT was founded in 1997, succeeding the Junta Nacional de Investigação Científica e Tecnológica.

== Vision ==
- To establish Portugal as a global reference in science, technology and innovation
- Ensure that knowledge generated by scientific research is used fully, for economic growth and the well-being of all citizens

== Research units funded by FCT ==
Most scientific research in Portugal takes place in R&D institutions financed and evaluated by FCT. As of 2019 there are 26 Associate Laboratories and 307 R&D Units, where 22,000 researchers work. These institutions are regularly evaluated by FCT.

== Publications ==
Philosophica
- Discipline: History of philosophy
- Language: English, French, Portuguese, Spanish
- Edited by: António Pedro Mesquita

Publication details
- History: 1993–present
- Publisher: Philosophy Documentation Center
- Frequency: Biannually
- Open access: Yes
- License: CC BY-NC-ND

Standard abbreviations
- ISO 4: Philosophica

Indexing
- ISSN: 0872-4784 (print); 2183-0134 (web)
- LCCN: 95-648860
- OCLC no.: 614449618

Links
- Journal homepage; Online archive

The foundation, together with the University of Lisbon's Centre of Philosophy, publishes a biannual peer-reviewed open-access academic journal, Philosophica, International Journal for the History of Philosophy, which covers all areas of the history of philosophy. Beginning 2022 it is published on their behalf by the Philosophy Documentation Center.
