= List of Portuguese people =

The following is a list of notable and historically significant people from Portugal.

== Navigators, explorers and pioneers ==
=== 15th century ===
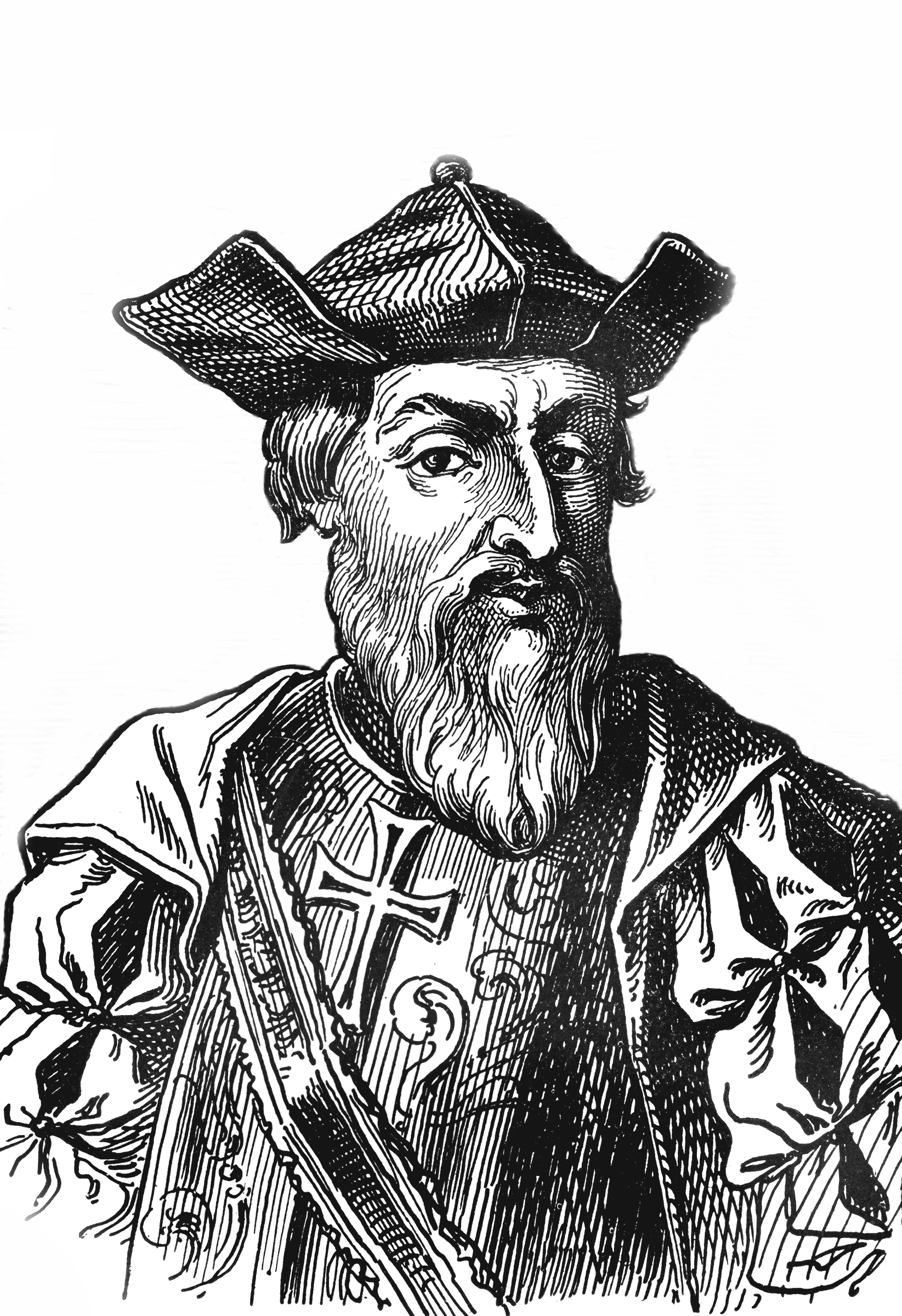
Vasco da Gama, discoverer of the sea route to India

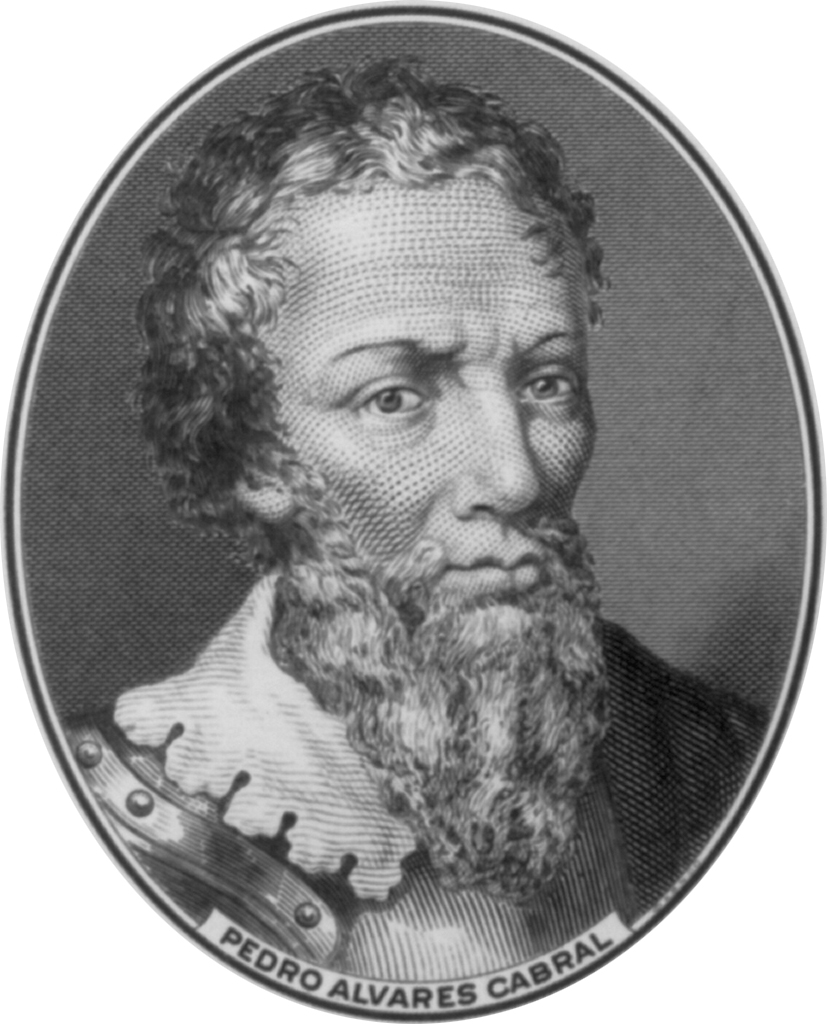
Pedro Álvares Cabral, discoverer of Brazil

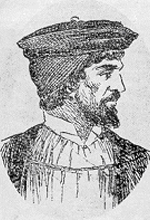
João Vaz Corte-Real, discoverer of Newfoundland.

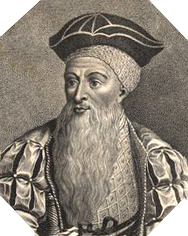
Afonso de Albuquerque, naval admiral and viceroy of India.

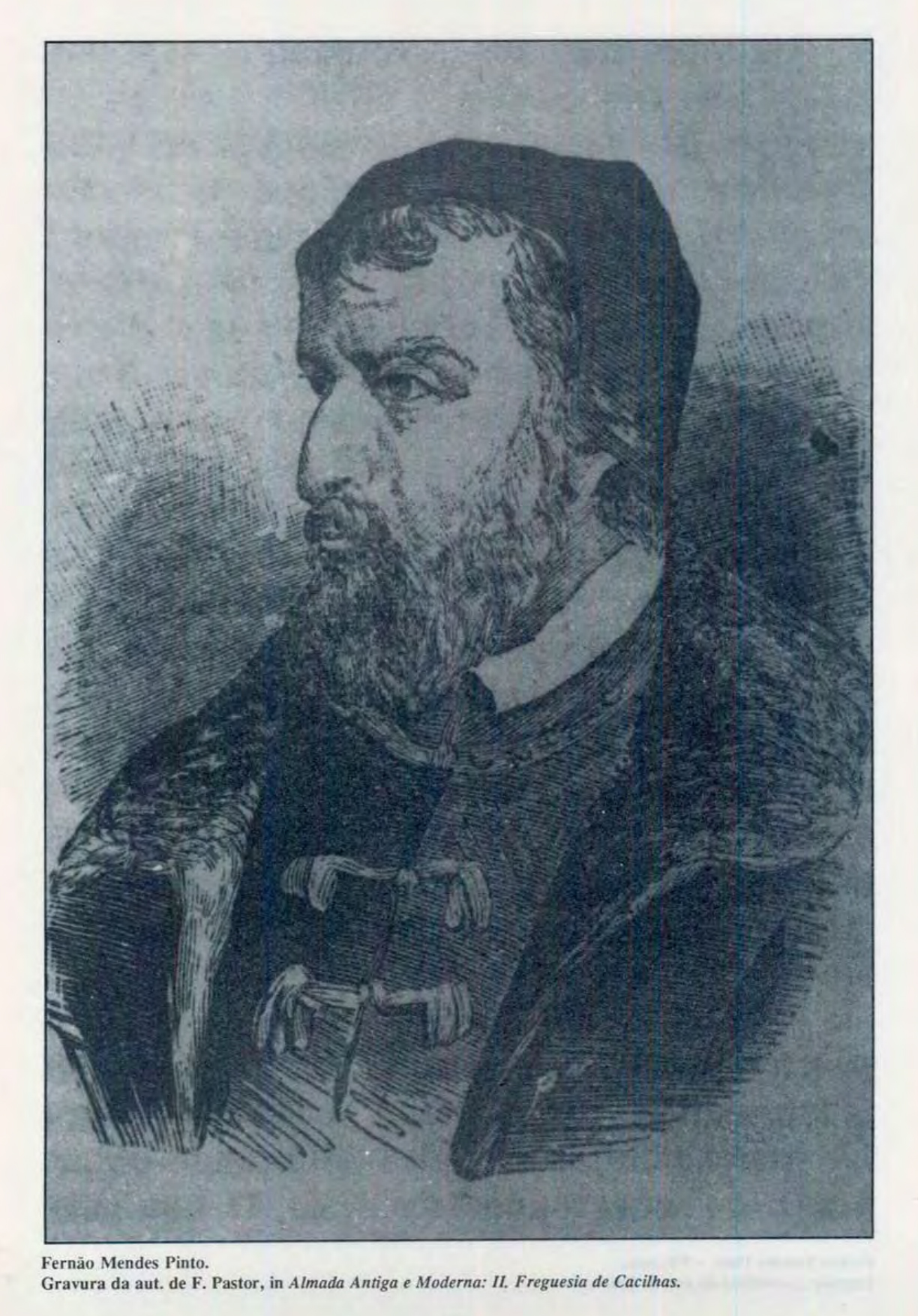
Fernão Mendes Pinto, writer and one of the first to travel to Japan

- Afonso Gonçalves Baldaia, explorer of the African coast
- Álvaro Caminha, explorer of the Atlantic islands
- Álvaro Martins, explorer of the African coast
- Alvise Cadamosto, explorer of the Atlantic islands and of the African coast
- André Gonçalves, explorer of the sea route to Brazil
- Antão Gonçalves, explorer of the African coast
- Álvaro Fernandes, explorer of the African coast
- Bartolomeu Dias, explorer of the African coast
- Bartolomeu Perestrelo, explorer of the Atlantic islands
- Dinis Dias, explorer of the African coast
- Diogo Cão, explorer of the African coast
- Diogo de Azambuja, explorer of the African coast
- Diogo de Teive, explorer of the Atlantic islands
- Diogo Dias, explorer of the Atlantic islands, of the African coast and the Indian Ocean, discovered Madagascar
- Diogo Silves, explorer of the Atlantic islands
- Duarte Pacheco Pereira, explorer of the Atlantic
- Fernão do Pó, explorer of the African coast
- Gil Eanes, explorer of the African coast
- Gonçalo Velho, explorer of the Atlantic islands
- João de Santarém, explorer of the Atlantic islands
- João Gonçalves Zarco, explorer of the Atlantic islands
- João Grego, explorer of the African coast
- João Infante, explorer of the African coast
- João Vaz Corte-Real, explorer of North America
- Lopes Gonçalves, explorer of the Atlantic
- Nicolau Coelho, explorer of the sea route to Brazil
- Nuno Tristão, explorer of the African coast
- Paulo da Gama, explorer of the sea route to India
- Pedro Álvares Cabral, discoverer of Brazil in 1500
- Pedro Escobar, explorer of the Atlantic islands
- Pero de Alenquer, explorer of the African coast
- Pero de Sintra, explorer of the African coast
- Pero Dias, explorer of the African coast
- Pero Vaz de Caminha, explorer of the sea route to Brazil
- Tristão Vaz Teixeira, explorer of the Atlantic islands
- Vasco da Gama, led the discovery of the sea route to India in 1498

=== 15th/16th century ===
- Afonso de Paiva, diplomat and explorer in Ethiopia
- Fernão de Noronha, explorer of the Atlantic
- Gaspar de Lemos, explorer of the Atlantic and of the sea route to Brazil
- Gonçalo Coelho, explorer of the South American coast
- João Fernandes Lavrador, explorer of North America
- Pero da Covilhã, diplomat and explorer in Ethiopia and India
- Pero de Barcelos, explorer of North America
- Francisco Zeimoto, explorer and trader one of the first to reach Japan

=== 16th century ===
- Afonso de Albuquerque, naval admiral and viceroy of India
- António de Abreu, explorer of Indonesia
- António Mota, among the first to reach Japan
- Bento de Góis, explorer
- Cristóvão Jacques, explorer of the Brazilian coast
- Cristóvão de Mendonça, some have claimed he discovered Australia; this is disputed
- Diogo Lopes de Sequeira, explorer of the Indian Ocean
- Diogo Rodrigues, explorer of the Indian Ocean
- Duarte Fernandes, diplomat in Thailand
- Estevão da Gama, explorer of the Indian Ocean
- Fernão Lopez, soldier in India and first resident of the island of Saint Helena
- Fernão Mendes Pinto, among the first to reach Japan
- Fernão Pires de Andrade, merchant in China
- Francisco Álvares, missionary and explorer in Ethiopia
- Francisco de Almeida, explorer and viceroy of India
- Gaspar Corte-Real, explorer of North America
- Gomes de Sequeira, some claim he discovered Australia; this is disputed
- João da Nova, explorer of the Atlantic and of the Indian Ocean
- Jorge Álvares, the first to reach China
- João Rodrigues Cabrilho, discoverer of California
- Lourenço Marques, trader and explorer in East Africa
- Martim Afonso de Sousa, explorer and soldier in India
- Miguel Corte-Real, explorer of North America
- Paulo Dias de Novais, colonizer of Africa
- Pedro Mascarenhas, explorer of the Indian Ocean
- Tristão da Cunha, naval general and discoverer
- Ferdinand Magellan, led the first successful attempt to circumnavigate the Earth (1519–1522); explorer of the Pacific Ocean

=== 17th century ===
- Estêvão Cacella, missionary and explorer of Tibet, first European in Bhutan
- Baltasar Fernandes, explorer of Brazil's interior
- Jerónimo Lobo, missionary and explorer of Ethiopia
- Luís Vaz de Torres, 16th-century/17th-century explorer of south-west Pacific
- Pedro Fernandes de Queirós, 16th-century/17th-century explorer of south-west Pacific, some claim he discovered Australia
- Pedro Teixeira, explorer of the Amazon River
- António Raposo Tavares, bandeirante

=== 18th century ===
- Alexandre Rodrigues Ferreira, explorer of Brazil's interior
- Francisco de Lacerda, explorer of Africa

=== 19th century ===
- Alexandre de Serpa Pinto, explorer of Africa
- António da Silva Porto, explorer of Africa
- Hermenegildo Capelo, explorer of Africa
- Roberto Ivens, explorer of Africa

=== 20th century ===
- Gago Coutinho and Sacadura Cabral, first to cross the South Atlantic Ocean by air

== Monarchs ==
- Monarchs of Portugal

== Saints ==
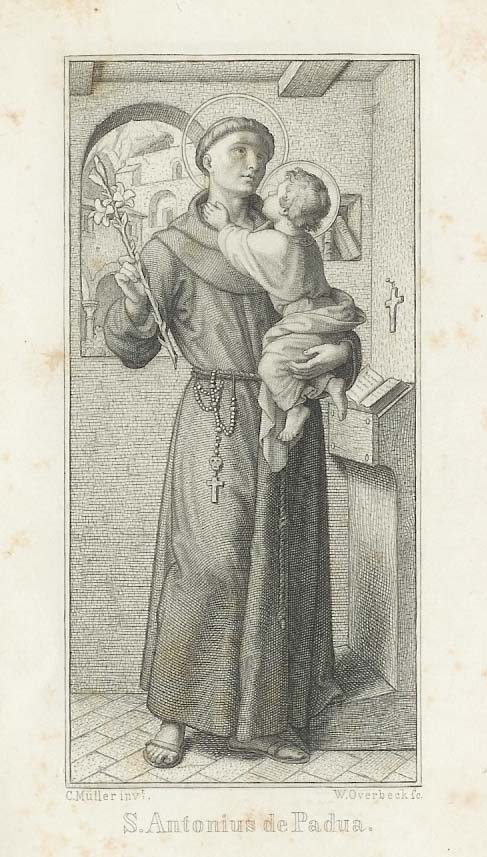
Saint Anthony of Lisbon (or Padua)

- Amador of Portugal (Early Christianity)
- Anthony of Lisbon (1195–1231)
- Beatrice of Silva (1424–1490)
- Elizabeth of Portugal (1271–1336)
- Felix the Hermit (9th century)
- Francisco Marto (1908–1919)
- Fructuosus of Braga (7th century)
- Irene of Tomar (7th century)
- Jacinta Marto (1910–1920)
- John de Brito (1647–1693)
- John of God (1495–1550)
- Julia (3rd century)
- Mantius of Évora (Early Christianity)
- Martin of Braga (520–580)
- Maxima (3rd century)
- Nuno Álvares Pereira (1360–1431)
- Peter of Rates (1st century)
- Quiteria (5th century)
- Rita Amada de Jesus (1848–1913)
- Rudesind (10th century)
- Saint Ovidius (1st and 2nd centuries)
- Theotonius (1088–1166)
- Verissimus (3rd century)
- Wilgefortis (folk saint)

== Blessed ==
- Alexandrina of Balasar (1904–1955)
- Amadeus of Portugal (1420–1482)
- Bartolomeu dos Mártires (1514–1590)
- Ferdinand the Holy Prince (1402–1443)
- Inácio de Azevedo (1528–1570)
- Joan, Princess of Portugal (1452–1490)
- Mafalda of Portugal (1190–1256)
- Sancha of Portugal (1180–1229)
- Teresa of Portugal (1181–1250)
- Elizabeth of Portugal (1282–1325)

== Religious ==
- António de Andrade (1580–1634), missionary, explorer of Tibet
- António Vieira (1608–1697), writer, diplomat and preacher
- João Ferreira Annes de Almeida (1628–1691), missionary
- Luís Fróis, jesuit and missionary in Japan
- Paulo António de Carvalho e Mendonça (1702–1770), priest and cardinal, Inquisitor-General of the Holy Inquisition
- Lúcia de Jesus dos Santos (1907–2005), visionary, involved in the 1917 Fátima events
- Paulus Orosius (385–420), historian, theologian and disciple of St. Augustine

== Popes ==
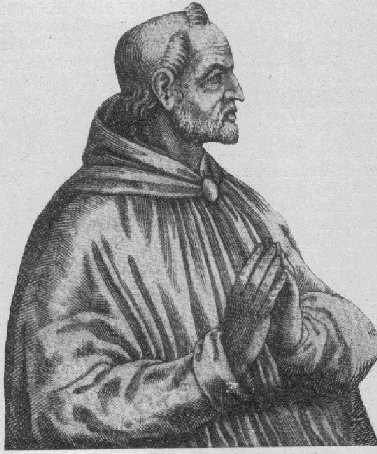
Pope John XXI

- Damasus I, 4th-century pope
- John XXI, 13th-century pope

== Philosophers ==
- Agostinho da Silva (1906–1994)
- António Castanheira Neves (born 1929)
- António Sérgio (1883–1969)
- Damião de Góis (1502–1574)
- Eduardo Lourenço (1923–2020)
- José Gil (born 1939)

== Musicians ==
- Adriano Correia de Oliveira (1942–1982), singer
- Alfredo Keil (1850–1907), composer of the Portuguese anthem
- Ana Free (born 1987), singer
- Ana Moura (born 1979), singer, fadista
- António Zambujo (born 1975), singer, fadista
- Alfredo Marceneiro (1891–1982), fado singer
- Amália Rodrigues (1920–1999), the most famous fado singer
- António Fragoso (1897–1918), piano composer
- António Pinho Vargas (born 1951), classical, jazz and piano composer
- António Variações (1944–1984), singer-songwriter
- Aurea, singer
- Camané (born 1967), singer, fadista
- Carlos do Carmo (1939–2021), singer, fadista
- Carlos Paredes (1925–2004), Portuguese guitar player
- Carlos Seixas (1704–1742), composer
- Cristina Branco (born 1972), fado singer
- Danny Fernandes, singer
- David Fonseca (born 1973), singer
- Diogo Piçarra, singer
- DJ Vibe, DJ
- Duarte Lobo (1565–1646), composer
- Dulce Pontes (born 1969), singer
- Fernando Lopes Graça (1906–1995), composer
- Fernando Ribeiro (born 1974), Moonspell vocals
- Francisco d'Andrade (1856–1921), international opera baritone
- Guilhermina Suggia (1885–1950), cellist
- Isabel Soveral (born 1961), composer
- Jay Kay (born 1969), singer; Portuguese father
- João Domingos Bomtempo (1775–1842), composer
- Joaquim José Antunes (1725–1790), harpsichord maker
- Jorge Palma (born 1950), singer, pianist and songwriter
- José Afonso (1929–1987), aka Zeca Afonso, composer, player
- Luciana Abreu (born 1985), singer, composer, actress, TV host
- Lúcia Moniz (born 1976), singer, actress
- Luís de Freitas Branco (1890–1955), composer
- Luísa Todi (1753–1833), lyrical singer
- Mafalda Arnauth (born 1974), fado singer
- Malvina Garrigues (1825–1904), opera soprano
- Manuela Azevedo, singer
- Maria Ascensão (1926–2001), folklorist
- Maria João Pires (born 1944), piano player
- Maria João (born 1956), jazz singer
- Mário Laginha (born 1960), piano player
- Mariza (born 1973), fado singer
- Mísia, fado singer
- Nelly Furtado, singer
- Nuno Bettencourt (born 1966), guitarist, singer-songwriter
- Paulo Furtado, blues performer
- Pedro de Escobar (c. 1465 – 1535), composer
- Rita Guerra (born 1967), singer
- Rita Redshoes, singer
- Rui da Silva, disc jockey
- Rui Gomes de Briteiros (1190? - 1249), troubadour
- Rui Veloso (born 1957), singer
- Salvador Sobral (born 1989), singer
- Sara Tavares (born 1978), singer
- Shawn Desman, singer
- Shawn Mendes, singer
- Sérgio Godinho (born 1948), singer
- Steve Perry, lead singer of band Journey
- Teresa Salgueiro (born 1969), Madredeus vocals
- José Vianna da Motta (1868–1948), piano player, composer
- Vitorino (born 1942), singer

== Writers ==
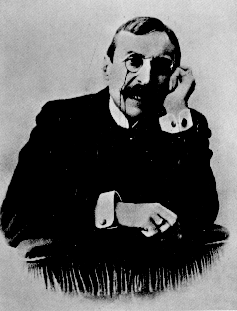
José Maria de Eça de Queiroz, realist writer

=== Fictionists ===
- Agustina Bessa-Luís
- Alexandre Herculano
- Almeida Garrett, also a poet and playwright
- Alves Redol, neo-realist writer
- António Lobo Antunes
- Aquilino Ribeiro, neo-realist writer
- Bernardim Ribeiro
- Camilo Castelo Branco
- Carlos de Oliveira
- Eça de Queiroz
- Gonçalo M. Tavares
- Hélia Correia
- Inês Pedrosa
- Irene Lisboa (1892–1958)
- João Aguiar, writer
- José Cardoso Pires
- José Rodrigues Miguéis (1901–1980), writer
- José Saramago, Nobel Prize for Literature in 1998
- Júlio Dinis
- Mário de Sá-Carneiro, novelist and poet
- Miguel Torga, also a poet
- Ramalho Ortigão
- Raul Brandão (1867–1930)
- Soeiro Pereira Gomes, neo-realist writer
- Vergílio Ferreira
- Vitorino Nemésio

=== Poets ===
- Ana Luísa Amaral
- Antero de Quental
- António Nobre
- Camilo Pessanha
- Cesário Verde
- David Mourão-Ferreira
- Eugénio de Andrade
- Fernando Pessoa, poet writer philosopher, described as one of the most significant literary figures of the 20th century
- Fiama Hasse Pais Brandão, poet and writer
- Guerra Junqueiro, poet and writer
- Herberto Hélder
- Jorge de Sena, writer and poet
- José Gomes Ferreira, writer
- Luís Vaz de Camões, poet, playwright
- Manuel Alegre, poet, writer and politician
- Manuel Maria Barbosa du Bocage
- Sá de Miranda
- Sophia de Mello Breyner Andresen
- Teixeira de Pascoaes
- Vasco Graça Moura

=== Others ===
- Agostinho da Silva, writer and philosopher
- Alice Vieira, children's books writer
- Almada Negreiros
- Álvaro Cunhal, neo-realist writer
- Álvaro Magalhães, writer
- Ana de Castro Osório, writer and pioneer feminist
- André de Resende, writer
- António Ferreira (poet)
- António José da Silva, playwright
- António Vieira (1608–1697), preacher and writer
- Damião de Góis, writer
- Eduardo Lourenço
- Fernão Lopes (c. 1380–1458), royal chronicler
- Gil Vicente, playwright
- Gomes Eanes de Zurara, chronicler
- João de Barros, writer and historian
- Luiz Pacheco (1925–2008), writer and editor
- Natália Correia, writer and poet
- Raul Proença (1884–1941), writer
- Rosa Lobato Faria, writer
- Rui de Pina, chronicler
- Tomé Pires (1465–1540), author of the Suma Oriental
- Urbano Tavares Rodrigues, writer and journalist

== Artists ==
- Sofia Areal, painter
- Almada Negreiros (1893–1970), 20th-century painter
- Amadeo de Souza Cardoso (1887–1918), 20th-century painter
- Ana Dias (born 1984), photographer of erotic femininity
- António Soares dos Reis (1847–1889), 19th-century sculptor
- Aurélia de Souza (1865–1922), 19th/20th-century painter
- Columbano Bordalo Pinheiro (1857–1929), 19th/20th-century painter
- Eduardo Gageiro (1935–2025), 20th-century photographer and photojournalist
- Fernando Lanhas (1923–2012), 20th/21st-century painter and architect
- Filipe Alarcão (born 1963), urban and modern contemporary designer
- Helena Corrêa de Barros (1910–2000), 20th-century photographer
- João M. P. Lemos, cartoonist
- José Dias Coelho (1923–1961), 20th-century artist
- José Malhoa, 19th-century painter
- Joshua Benoliel (1873–1932), 19th/20th-century photographer
- Júlio Pomar (1926–2018), 20th-century painter
- Marco Mendes (born 1978), comic artist
- Manuel Pereira da Silva (1920–2003), 20th-century sculptor
- Nadir Afonso (1920–2013), geometric abstract painter
- Nuno Gonçalves, 15th-century painter
- Paula Rego, 20th-century painter
- Rafael Bordalo Pinheiro, 19th-century caricaturist
- Raquel Gameiro (1889–1970), painter and illustrator
- Vasco Fernandes (Grão Vasco), 15th-century painter
- Vieira da Silva, 20th-century painter

== Scientists ==
- Adelaide Estrada (1898 – 1979)
- Abel Salazar (1889–1946)
- Alexandre Quintanilha (born 1945)
- André de Resende (c. 1500 – 1573)
- António A. de Freitas (born 1947), immunologist
- António Damásio (born 1944), neurologist
- Bartolomeu de Gusmão (1685–1724), inventor
- Bento de Jesus Caraça (1901–1948), mathematician
- Diogo Abreu (born 1947), geographer
- Egas Moniz (1874–1955), neurologist and Nobel Prize for Medicine in 1949
- Freitas-Magalhães (born 1966), psychologist
- Garcia de Orta (c. 1499 – 1568), botanical scientist
- Hanna Damásio (born 1942), neurologist
- Jacob de Castro Sarmento (c. 1691 – 1762)
- João de Pina-Cabral (born 1954), anthropologist
- João Magueijo (born 1967), physicist
- Miguel Vale de Almeida (born 1960), anthropologist
- Benedita Barata da Rocha (1949–2021), immunologist
- Orlando Ribeiro (1911–1997), geographer
- Pedro Nunes (1502–1578), mathematician and cosmographer
- Raquel Seruca (1962–2022), oncobiologist
- Sousa Martins (1843–1897)
- Tomé Pires (c. 1465–c. 1540)
- Ana Passos (born 1967) politician and biologist

== Engineers and architects ==
- Álvaro Siza Vieira (born 1933), architect
- João Luís Carrilho da Graça, architect
- Edgar Cardoso (1913–2000), engineer
- Nuno Montenegro (born 1970), architect
- Eduardo Souto de Moura, architect
- Fernando Távora (1923–2005), architect
- José Tribolet, engineer, IST professor
- Tomás Taveira (born 1938), architect
- António Maria Braga, architect

== Psychiatrists ==
- João dos Santos

== Actors and directors ==
=== Actors ===
- Alexandra Lencastre (born 1965)
- Ana Rita Machado (born 1991)
- António Silva
- Beatriz Batarda
- Beatriz Costa
- Carmen Miranda (1909–1955), singer and actress
- Daniela Melchior
- Daniela Ruah
- Diogo Infante
- Diogo Morgado
- Eunice Muñoz (1928–2022)
- Fernando Rocha (born 1975), comedian, actor
- Francisco Ribeiro (1911–1984), actor, comedian, film director, theatre director
- Herman José (born 1954), actor and humourist
- João Villaret (1913–1961), actor and poetry reader
- Joaquim de Almeida (born 1957)
- Louis Ferreira
- Maria de Medeiros
- Maria Matos (1890–1952)
- Nicolau Breyner
- Nuno Lopes (born 1978)
- Raul Solnado, actor and humourist
- Teresa Aço, actor
- Vasco Santana (1898–1958)
- Vivian dsena, actor and model

=== Directors ===
- António Lopes Ribeiro (1908–1995)
- Constantino Esteves
- Diana Andringa
- João César Monteiro (1939–2003)
- João Pedro Rodrigues
- Luís Miguel Cintra (born 1948)
- Manoel de Oliveira (1908–2015)
- Marco Martins (born 1972)
- Miguel Gomes
- Pedro Costa
- Rita Azevedo Gomes
- Vasco Nunes (1974–2016), director, cinematographer, producer

=== Others ===
- Vera Mantero (born 1966), dancer and choreographer

== Soldiers ==
- Álvaro Vaz de Almada (count of Avranches) (1390–1449), knight of the Garter, Captain-major of Portugal, killed in battle
- Fernando de Almada (count of Avranches) (1430–1496), Captain-major of Portugal
- Otelo Saraiva de Carvalho (1936–2021), chief strategist of the Carnation Revolution of Portugal
- Aníbal Augusto Milhais (1895–1970), most decorated soldier Ordem de Torre e Espada do Valor, Lealdade e Mérito of Portugal
- Salgueiro Maia (1944–1992), Captain who led a cavalry unit into Lisbon during the Carnation Revolution of Portugal

== Sports ==
=== Football ===
- Bernardo Silva (born 1994) football player
- Carlos Queiroz, football coach
- Costinha (born 1974), football player
- Cristiano Ronaldo (born 1985), football player
- Dinis Vital (1932–2014), football player
- Diogo Jota (1996–2025), football player
- Eusébio (1942–2014), football player, born in Portuguese Mozambique; later moved to Portugal
- Francisco Conceiçao (born 2002), football player
- Hugo Almeida (born 1984), football player
- José Mourinho, football coach
- João Cancelo, football player
- João Félix, football player
- João Moutinho, football player
- Luís Figo (born 1972), football player
- Luís Miguel Afonso Fernandes, football player
- Maniche (born 1977), football player
- Matheus Nunes (born 1998) football player
- Nani, football player
- Nuno Gomes, football player
- Pauleta, football player
- Paulo Ferreira, football player
- Paulo Futre, former football player
- Paulo Sousa, former football player
- Ricardo Carvalho, football player
- Ricardo Pereira, football player
- Ricardo Quaresma (born 1983), football player
- Ricardo Sá Pinto, football player
- Rúben Dias (born 1997) football player
- Rui Costa (born 1972), football player
- Simão Sabrosa (born 1979), football player
- Vítor Baía (born 1969), football player

=== Cyclists ===
- Joaquim Agostinho, cyclist
- José Azevedo, cyclist
- Rui Costa, cycling world champion

=== Runners ===
- Carlos Lopes (born 1947), marathon Olympic champion
- Fernanda Ribeiro (born 1969), 10,000m Olympic champion
- Francis Obikwelu, Nigerian-born runner
- Rosa Mota (born 1958), marathon Olympic champion

=== Others ===
- António Jesus Correia (1924–2003), football and roller hockey (quad) player
- António Livramento (1944–1999), hockey player
- Rui Madeira, rally driver
- Carlos Sousa, off-road driver, world champion in 2003
- Gustavo Ribeiro (born 2001), skateboarder
- João Garcia, mountaineer
- João Sousa, tennis player
- Moises Henriques, Australian cricketer from Portugal
- Pedro Lamy, former Formula One and DTM driver
- Telma Monteiro, four times judo silver medalist at world championships
- Tiago Monteiro, former Champ Car and Formula One driver
- Ticha Penicheiro, WNBA player
- Yotam Hanochi (born 2000), Israeli-Portuguese basketball player
- Vanessa Fernandes, triathlon world champion

== Politicians ==
- Afonso Costa (1871–1937), Prime Minister during the First Republic
- Alberto João Jardim (born 1943), President of Regional Government of the Madeira Autonomous Region for 37 years
- Alexandra Vieira (born 1966), member of the Assembly of the Republic (2019–2022), member of the Braga City Council (2017–2021)
- Álvaro Cunhal (1913–2005), former General Secretary of the Portuguese Communist Party
- Ana Passos (born 1967), politician and biologist, member of the Assembly of the Republic of Portugal (2015–2022), member of Faro Municipal Assembly (2009–2013, 2017–2025)
- Aníbal Cavaco Silva, Prime Minister and President of the Republic
- Anton de Vieira (1682–1745), governor of St Petersburg and Okhotsk
- António Costa (born 1961), Prime Minister and President of the European Council
- António de Oliveira Salazar (1889–1970), head of government and de facto leader of the Estado Novo dictatorial regime for 36 years
- António Guterres, Prime Minister, Secretary-General of the United Nations, United Nations High Commissioner for Refugees and President of the Socialist International
- António Vitorino, Minister, judge of the Constitutional Court, EU Commissioner and Director General of the International Organization for Migration
- Bento Gonçalves (1902–1942), General Secretary of the Portuguese Communist Party
- Carlos Alberto da Mota Pinto (1936–1985), Prime Minister
- Carlos Carvalhas (born 1941), General Secretary of the Portuguese Communist Party
- Diogo Freitas do Amaral, President of the General Assembly of the United Nations and Minister of Foreign Affairs
- Duarte Pio, Duke of Bragança, claimant to the abolished throne of Portugal
- Francisco Sá Carneiro (1934–1980), Prime Minister
- Jaime Ornelas Camacho (1921–2016), first President of the Regional Government of Madeira
- Jerónimo de Sousa (born 1947), General Secretary of the Portuguese Communist Party
- Jorge Sampaio, President of the Republic and Mayor of Lisbon
- José Manuel Barroso, Prime Minister and President of the European Commission
- José Sócrates, Prime Minister
- Manuel Pinho (born 1954), Minister of the Economy and Innovation
- Marcelo Caetano (1906–1980), last head of government of the Estado Novo dictatorial regime, from 1968 to 1974
- Mário Soares (1924–2017), Prime Minister and President of the Republic
- Octávio Pato (1925–1999)
- Pedro Santana Lopes, Prime Minister and Mayor of Lisbon
- Teresa Heinz Kerry, philanthropist and wife of US Senator John Kerry
- Sebastião José de Carvalho e Melo, 1st Marquis of Pombal (1699–1782), statesman
- Vasco Gonçalves (1922–2005), Prime Minister

== Historians ==
- Diogo do Couto (1542–1616), historian of India and Sri Lanka
- José Hermano Saraiva (1919–2012)
- Rui Nepomuceno (1936-2024), lawyer and historian of Madeira

== Businesspeople ==
- Américo Amorim (1934–2017)
- Belmiro de Azevedo (1938–2017)
- Francisco Pinto Balsemão (1937–2025)
- Joe Berardo (born 1944)
- Salvador Caetano (1926–2011)
- António Champalimaud (1918–2004)
- Antonia Ferreira (1811–1896), winemaker

== Other ==
- Catarina de Albuquerque (born 1970), UN Special Rapporteur
- Mariana Alcoforado (1624–1723), nun and writer
- Rita Almeida (born 1974), World Bank economist
- Jorge de Cabedo (1525–1604), jurist
- Catarina Eufémia (1928–1954), assassinated rural worker
- Abraham Aboab Falero, 17th century Jewish philanthropist
- Aires de Ornelas e Vasconcelos (1837–1880), 19th-century archbishop of the Portuguese colonial enclave Goa
- Deu-la-Deu Martins 14th century hero
- Fernando Pessa (1902–2002), journalist
- Sara Sampaio (born 1991), model
- Eliza Brown Newton Smart (1844–1930), missionary and reformer

== See also ==
- List of Portuguese monarchs
- Presidents of Portugal
- List of prime ministers of Portugal
- List of mayors of Lisbon
