= Rui Gomes de Briteiros =

Portuguese nobleman and troubadour (c. 1190?–c. 1249)

Rui Gomes de Briteiros (c. 1190? - c. 1249) was a Portuguese nobleman and troubadour who led one of the most remarkable ascents in the nobility hierarchy of the 13th century.

== Early years ==
The son of Gomes Mendes de Briteiros and Urraca Gomes da Silva, Rui came paternally from a line of infants who lived in the region of Longos, Guimarães. He would have been born at the end of the 12th century, as it is known that he would have been an adult around 1220.

== Sacho I's inheritance crisis ==
On 26 March 1211, Sancho I died in Coimbra. His will of October 1209[1] was clear - he divided his largest portions between his heir, Afonso II of Portugal, and his sisters Teresa, Sancha and Mafalda bequeathing to the three of them, under the title of queens, the possession of some castles in the centre of the country - Montemor-o-Velho, Seia and Alenquer - with their respective towns, terms, wards and revenues). This will provoked violent internal conflicts (1211-1216) between Afonso II and his sisters, as Afonso refused to comply with the will in an attempt to centralise royal power and prevent the exaggerated accumulation of assets by the Church and the Orders his sisters joined.

=== The exile ===
Around this time, Rui Gomes left the kingdom, like many Portuguese noble families. He accompanied the Infante Pedro into exile. This attitude showed that Pedro had also sided with his sisters Mafalda, Sancha and Teresa.

Rui and the Infante took up residence in the kingdom that had belonged to Teresa of Portugal, the Kingdom of León, and at different times were given the positions of Chief Majordomo and Alferes. From then on, the Infante launched attacks on the kingdom's borders, even taking over some of the towns in Trás-os-Montes, but was eventually defeated. The dispute would have had international repercussions, as King Alfonso IX of León intervened to defend his ex-wife, Teresa, at her request, conquering Coimbra. To balance the forces, King Alfonso VIII of Castile also intervened in favour of Alfonso II. After a five-year war, the Luso-Castilian party declared itself victorious.

On the death of Alfonso IX, Infante Pedro left to serve as a mercenary in Morocco, in the service of the Almohad Amir al-Mu'minin, and continued these functions in the Kingdom of Aragon and the Principality of Catalonia, at the time governed by his nephew, James I of Aragon, who welcomed him benevolently.

For his part, Rui Gomes would separate from the infante, as he returned to Portugal.

== Troubadour culture and marriage ==
=== Sousão's patronage of culture ===
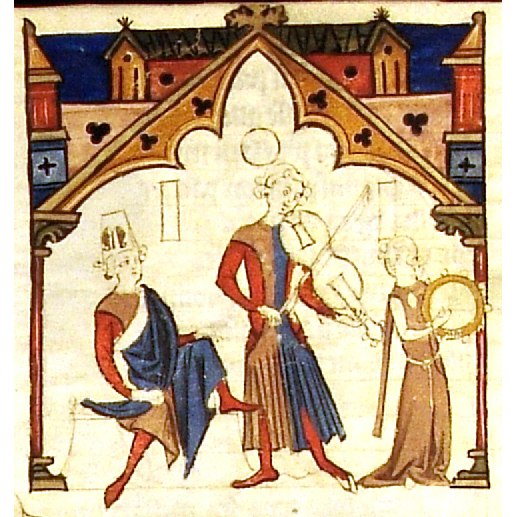
Troubadours, represented in the Cancioneiro da Ajuda.

The premature death of Afonso II in 1223 had led to the rise of the de Sousa family, who, upon the arrival of Elvira and her sisters, already held some power over the minor king Sancho II of Portugal. The head of the family, Gonçalo Mendes II de Sousa, had obtained the stewardship in December 1224, and the government of several tenencies, especially in the Beira region.

The de Sousa family, as an entity more separate from the crown, would be the biggest sponsors of troubadourism, being closely linked to this activityː Gonçalo Mendes and Garcia Mendes II, Gonçalo Garcia and Fernão Garcia. Gonçalo Mendes (the head of the family) would also knight a brother of Rui Gomes, Gonçalo Gomes de Briteiros.

The generally regal environment in which this activity was centred was faced in Portugal with a more lordly environment, which was what in fact welcomed and made troubadourism flourish, in the vernacular language (Galician-Portuguese), as opposed to the royal curia's preference for traditional Latin, which continued to be evident in documents of this origin.

==== Work ====
Rui was also a troubadour, as evidenced by the two songs that have survived to this day, both of which are songs of mockery and cursing.

- Joam Fernándiz quer [ir] guerreiar (Complete text and analysis)
- Joam Fernándiz, aqui é chegado (Complete text and analysis)

=== Kidnap ===
It was around this time that, perhaps inspired by the troubadour culture in which he lived, and probably being, like his brother, a vassal of Gonçalo Mendes de Sousa, Rui joined the ‘family’ around 1230, when he married Elvira Anes da Maia, daughter of João Pires da Maia and Guiomar Mendes de Sousa, and therefore Sousão's niece by maternal origin.

How Rui's relationship with Elvira originated is a matter of debateː according to the most recent Books of Lineages (namely the Livro de Linhagens do Deão and the Livro de Linhagens do Conde D. Pedro), Elvira was kidnapped by Rui Gomes de Briteiros, who, contrary to usual practice, was not challenged or threatened by the family that kidnapped her (the Sousas). The oldest of these, the Livro Velho de Linhagens, doesn't even mention it. Some authors defend the theory that the fact that she wasn't the victim of any revelation of such an act could be due to the fact that she was related to the kidnapped woman's family. In any case, whether it happened or not, the event is dated to around 1230.

Whether or not he feared reprisals, it seems that Rui left Portugal again for a while. It is possible that Rui Gomes was forced to leave Portugal again for a while, but there is news of his presence in the kingdom in 1238, which means that he had already returned. The mention comes from a dispute he had with the abbot of S.Gens de Montelongo, in which he claimed to have the rights of patronage and guesthouse in the abbey, which, after enquiry, turned out not to be true. His path in the following years is unknown, but he may have passed through the Castilian court in 1241 or 1242, judging by his participation in the cycle of songs addressed to the Moor João Fernandes, which took place in this context.

These were also the years when the conflict that led to the war and subsequent deposition of Sancho II of Portugal escalated, and during which Rui Gomes became one of the most fervent supporters of the latter's brother, Count Afonso of Bologna, with whom he met in Paris, where he witnessed the important document in which Count Afonso of Boulogne swore to accept the regency of the kingdom of Portugal.

== Ascension in the Portuguese Royal Court ==
After the end of the civil war, with the accession of Afonso III to the throne, he rewarded Rui's loyalty by elevating him to the rank of rich man (and then King Afonso made this Dom Roi Gomez high-borne, and gave him pendam and caldeira) and giving him the important post of Royal Steward, a position he held for only a short time.

== Death and legacy ==
It's likely that Rui died even before 1250, with 1249 as the probable date, in the context of the military operations that ended in the conquest of the Algarve. His rise through the courtly ranks was continued by his descendants, two of whom were also troubadours (his son Mem Rodrigues and his grandson João Mendes de Briteiros).

== Marriage and lineage ==
Rui married his supposed kidnap victim, the high-borne lady D. Elvira Anes da Maia. Elvira Anes da Maia, around 1230, and with her had the following children:

- Mem Rodrigues de Briteiros, married to Maria Anes da Veiga, with issue;
- João Rodrigues de Briteiros, married to Guiomar Gil de Soverosa, with issue;
- Maria Rodrigues de Briteiros, nun in Arouca Abbey
- Teresa Rodrigues de Briteiros, married to Lourenço Martins de Berredo
- Sancha Rodrigues de Briteiros, married to Pedro Ponces de Baião
- Urraca Rodrigues de Briteiros, nun in Lorvão Abbey
