= Livros de linhagens =

There are three livros de linhagens ('lineage books') from medieval Portugal:

- Livro Velho de Linhagens (1286–1290), fragmentary
- Livro de Linhagens do Deão (1343)
- Livro de Linhagens do Conde Dom Pedro (c. 1344)
