= Carlos Seixas =

Portuguese composer (1704–1742)

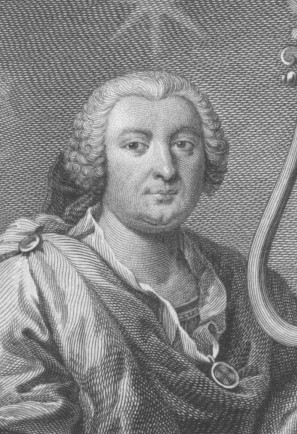
- Born: 11 June 1704; Coimbra, Portugal
- Died: 25 August 1742 (aged 38); Lisbon, Portugal
- Occupation: Composer

José António Carlos de Seixas (Portuguese: [ˈkaɾluʃ ˈsɐjʃɐʃ]; 11 June 1704 – 25 August 1742) was a Portuguese composer of the 18th century. An accomplished virtuoso of both the organ and the harpsichord, Seixas succeeded his father as the organist for Coimbra Cathedral at the age of fourteen. In 1720, he departed for the capital, Lisbon, where he was to serve as the organist for the royal chapel, one of the highest offices for a musician in Portugal, a position which earned him a knighthood. Much of Seixas' music rests in an ambiguous transitional period from the learned style of the 17th century to the galant style of the 18th century.

== Life ==
Seixas was born in Coimbra to Francisco Vaz and Marcelina Nunes. From a young age, he was surrounded by musical activity; his father served as the cathedral organist, and the flurry of musical activity in the local monastery of Santa Cruz had an equally important role in his musical training. In 1718, a few days before his father's death, Seixas succeeded his father as cathedral organist. Two years after, in 1720, he moved to Lisbon to take up his new position in the court of John V of Portugal as court organist and harpsichordist.

Due to his elegance and agility on the keyboard, Seixas was a favorite teacher of many noble families, including the family of Luís Xavier Furtado de Mendonça, the Viscount of Barbacena, where he gave harpsichord lessons to the Viscount's wife and daughters in exchange for artistic patronage. In Lisbon, Seixas met Italian composer Domenico Scarlatti, who was working in Portugal from 1719 to 1728 as appointed director of the court cathedral. In an account by José Mazza in his Diccionario biographico de Musicos portugueses e noticia das suas composições of 1780, the king's brother, Dom António, arranged for Scarlatti to give Seixas harpsichord lessons. Scarlatti, immediately recognizing Seixas' talent, replied, "You can give me lessons."

In 1731 he was married at age twenty-eight to D. Maria Joana Tomásia da Silva, with whom he had two sons and three daughters. He was knighted in 1738 by the king, inducted into the Order of Christ. Four years later, in 1742, he died of a rheumatic fever, and was buried in the Santa Maria Basilica in Lisbon.

== Works ==
Seixas' keyboard works were written for a variety of instruments, including the organ, harpsichord, and the clavichord. His sonatas showcase a range of musical styles: some are exemplary of a Baroque toccata; some are firmly in the galant style; some are clearly influenced by the German Empfindsamer Stil (literally 'sensitive style'). Despite rarely, if ever, traveling outside of Lisbon, his work also includes various geographical styles, such as the German Mannheim school, the French minuet, and the Italian style as composed by Scarlatti, his colleague and contemporary. Santiago Kastner, Seixas' biographer and editor of his pieces, describes Seixas' works as "unoccupied" with a particular form, and given over to frequent improvisation. Much of his work was destroyed in the earthquake that devastated Lisbon in 1755. Only three orchestral pieces and around one hundred keyboard sonatas out of over an alleged seven hundred survived, plus a handful of choral works for liturgical use (much more conservative than what one would expect from his instrumental music).

Macario Santiago Kastner published collections of the sonatas in Portugaliae Musica.

== Choral works ==
- Mass in G.
- Tantum ergo;
- Ardebat vincentius;
- Conceptio gloriosa;
- Gloriosa virginis Mariae;
- Hodie mobis caelorum;
- Sicut cedrus;
- Verbum caro;
- Dythyrambus in honorem et laudem Div. Antonii Olissiponensis.

== Instrumental works ==
- Overture in D;
- Harpsichord Concerto in A major;
- Harpsichord Concerto in G minor;
- Symphony in B flat;
- Harpsichord and organ sonatas and toccatas.

== Selected recordings ==
- Amon Ra CD-SAR 43 Harpsichord Sonatas played by Robert Woolley on a harpsichord made by Joaquim José Antunes in Portugal in 1785. The instrument is in the Finchcocks collection, Goudhurst, Kent, United Kingdom. The recording was made at Finchcocks in December 1988.
- Deutsche Grammophon 453-182. Two motets (Ardebat Vincentius and Tantum Ergo), in a two-disc collection also containing sacred music by Sousa Carvalho, António Teixeira, and F. A. de Almeida. Originally recorded in 1970, with the Gulbenkian Chamber Orchestra and Chorus conducted by Pierre Salzman and Michel Corboz.
- Stradivarius STR 33544 Keyboard Sonatas played by Bernard Brauchli on a copy of a clavichord after Manuel Carmo, Porto 1796. The recording was made in Switzerland in December 1998.
- Virgin Veritas 45114 Harpsichord Concerto, etc. played by Norwegian Baroque Orchestra - Ketil Haugsand.
- Virgin Veritas 45115 Missa Dixit Dominus, etc. played by Camara de Lisboa / Norwegian Baroque Orchestra - Ketil Haugsand.
- Portugaler 20102 SPA Música Sacra, Segréis de Lisboa, Coral Lisboa Cantat, Manuel Morais dir.
- Vox PVT 7171 Minuet and Toccata (Largo-Allegro) played by Elena Polanska
- Fandango - Scarlatti in Iberia - 6 sonatas played by Sophie Yates- UPC:095115063521 cf theclassicalshop.net CHAN 635
- Numerica, 2007. Fortepiano Sonatas played by Cremilde Rosado Fernandes on a copy by Denzel Wright of an original pianoforte built by Bartolomeo Cristofori. Recorded in Germany in 2005.
- Melographia Portugueza, 2012. Harpsichord Sonatas (Complete Recording, vol. I), played by José Carlos Araújo on a historic harpsichord made by Joaquim José Antunes in Lisbon in 1758, the earliest surviving Antunes harpsichord. The instrument is in the Lisbon Music Museum collection, Portugal.
- Melographia Portugueza, 2012. Organ Sonatas (Complete Recording, vol. II), played by José Carlos Araújo on a historic organ built by Fr. Manuel de São Bento in the Benedictine Monastery of São Bento da Vitória (Porto) in 1719, the largest and most important historic organ in Porto. This is the world premiere recording of this historic organ and the first complete CD recording of Seixas' organ sonatas.
- Melographia Portugueza, 2013. Harpsichord Sonatas (Complete Recording, vol. III), played by José Carlos Araújo on a historic harpsichord made by Joaquim José Antunes in Lisbon in 1758. The instrument is in the Lisbon Music Museum collection, Portugal.
- Melographia Portugueza, 2013. Harpsichord Sonatas (Complete Recording, vol. IV), played by José Carlos Araújo (harpsichords by Ton Amir and Johannes Klinkhamer (2006) after Chr. Vater, 1738, and Reinhard von Nagel (1992) after G. B. Giusti, 1693).
- Melographia Portugueza, 2013. Pianoforte Sonatas (Complete Recording, vol. V), played by José Carlos Araújo on a historical pianoforte made by Henri-Joseph van Casteel in Lisbon in 1763. The instrument is in the Lisbon Music Museum collection, Portugal.
- Melographia Portugueza, 2014. Organ Sonatas (Complete Recording, vol. VI), played by José Carlos Araújo on a historic organ built by D. Manuel Benito Gomez de Herrera in the Monastery of Arouca in 1739, one of the most important 18th-century organs in the Iberian Peninsula.

== Scores ==
- Alvarenga, João Pedro: Carlos Seixas: 12 Sonatas (Lisbon: Musicoteca, 1995).
- Doderer, Gerhard: Carlos Seixas: Ausgewählte Sonaten I-XV (= Organa Hispanica: Iberische Musik des 16., 17. und 18. Jahrhunderts für Tasteninstrumente, volume 7) (Heidelberg: Süddeutscher Musikverlag, 1982).
- Doderer, Gerhard: Carlos Seixas: Ausgewählte Sonaten XVI-XXX (= Organa Hispanica: Iberische Musik des 16., 17. und 18. Jahrhunderts für Tasteninstrumente, volume 8) (Heidelberg: Süddeutscher Musikverlag, 1982).
- Kastner, Macário Santiago: Cravistas Portugueses, volume 1 (Mainz: B. Schott's Söhne, 1935).
- Kastner, Macário Santiago: Cravistas Portugueses, volume 2 (Mainz: B. Schott's Söhne, 1950).
- Kastner, Macário Santiago: Carlos Seixas. 80 Sonatas para Tecla (= Portugaliae Musica, vol. 10) (Lisbon: Fundação Calouste Gulbenkian, 1965).
- Kastner, Macário Santiago and João Valeriano: Carlos Seixas. 25 Sonatas para Instrumentos de Tecla (= Portugaliae Musica, vol. 34) (Lisbon: Fundação Calouste Gulbenkian, 1980).
- Lourenço, José (ed.): 12 Toccatas: Carlos Seixas (Ava Musical Editions, 2007).
- Vasconcellos, Jorge Croner de and Fernandes, Armando José: Carlos Seixas: Tocatas e Minuetes (Lisbon: Biblioteca Nacional de Lisboa, 1975).

== Bibliography ==
- Allison, Brian J.: "Carlos Seixas. The Development of the Keyboard Sonata in Eighteenth-Century Portugal. A Lecture Recital Together with Three Recitals of Selected Works of Johann Sebastian Bach, Samuel Barber, Ludwig van Beethoven, Frederic Chopin, Cesar Franck, Sergei Prokofieff, and Alexander Scriabin", doctoral dissertation, North Texas State University, August 1982.
- d'Alvarenga, Joao Pedro: "Some Preliminaries in Approaching Carlos Seixas' Keyboard Sonatas", in: Ad Parnassum. A Journal of Eighteenth- and Nineteenth-Century Instrumental Music vol. 7 (2009), no. 13, pp. 95–128, academia.edu (accessed March 18, 2016).
- Bernardes, J. M. R. and Bernardes, I. R. S.: Uma Discografia de Cds da Composição Musical em Portugal: Do Século XIII aos Nossos Dias (INCM, 2003) [Contém 45 referências discográficas], pp. 222–234.
- Cruz, Maria Antonieta de Lima: Carlos de Seixas (Lisbon: Parceria António Maria Pereira, 1943).
- Doderer, Gerhard and Alvarenga, João Pedro: Comemorações Seixas - Bomtempo (Lisbon: Secretaria de Estado da Cultura, Direcção Geral dos Espectáculos e das Artes, 1992).
- Heimes, K. F.: Carlos Seixas's Keyboard Sonatas, diss., University of South Africa, 1967.
- Heimes, K. F.: "Carlos Seixas's Keyboard Sonatas: The Question of D. Scarlatti's Influence", in: Congresso A Arte em Portugal no Século XVIII (Braga, 1973), pp. 447–471.
- Kastner, Macario Santiago: Carlos de Seixas (Coimbra: Coimbra Editora, 1947).
- Kastner, Macario Santiago: "Carlos Seixas: Sus inquietudes entre lo barroco y lo prerromántico", in: Anuário Musical (Barcelona: CSIC), no. 43 (1988), pp. 163–187.
- Machado, Diogo Barbosa: Biblioteca Lusitana, 4 volumes (Coimbra: Atlântida Editora, 1965–1967).
- Mazza, José: Dicionário Biográfico de Músicos Portugueses, ed. José Augusto Alegria (Lisbon: Tipografia da Editorial Império, 1944–1945).
- Nery, Rui Vieira: A Música no Ciclo da Bibliotheca Lusitana (Lisbon: Fundação Calouste Gulbenkian, 1984).
- Pedrosa Cardoso, José Maria (ed.): Carlos Seixas, de Coimbra (Coimbra: Imprensa da Universidade, 2004).
- Ribeiro, Mário de Sampaio: José António Carlos de Seixas (Coimbra: Coimbra Editora, Separata de "Biblos", volume 14 (1939).
- Sandu, Constantin: "Notes for a History of Portugues Piano Music", in: Bulletin of the Transilvania University of Brasov, series VIII: Art & Sport, vol. 3, no. 52 (January 2010), pp. 29–36 (accessed March 19, 2016).
- SANDU, C., and D. C. Ibănescu: "Seixas and Soler, Defining Figures of the Portuguese and Spanish Baroque Music", in: Bulletin of the Transilvania University of Brasov, series VIII: Performing Arts, vol. 6, no. 1 (January 2013), pp. 59–64 (accessed March 21, 2016).
- Sarrautte, Jean-Paul: "Un compositeur portugais au XVIIIème siècle: Carlos Seixas", in: Arquivos do Centro cultural português, vol. 1 (1969), pp. 236–249.
- Thompson, Wendy, and Lalage Cochrane: "Seixas, (José António) Carlos de", in: The Oxford Companion to Music ( Oxford University Press, http://www.oxfordreference.com/view/10.1093/acref/9780199579037.001.0001/acref-9780199579037-e-6069).
- Vasconcelos, Joaquim de: Os Músicos Portuguezes: Biografia, Bibliografia, 2 volumes (Porto: Imprensa Portugueza, 1870).
- Vieira, Ernesto: Diccionario Biographico de Musicos Portuguezes (Lisboa: Lambertini, Edição Facsimilada de Arquimedes Livros, 2007/1900).
