= Ralph Holmes =

Holmes, 1970s

Ralph Holmes (1 April 1937 – 4 September 1984) was an English classical violinist. Not temperamentally inclined to displays of virtuosity, he frequently appeared as a conductor-soloist and chamber musician. As a concerto soloist, in addition to more familiar works he played many lesser-known ones, including concertos by Samuel Barber, Richard Rodney Bennett, Benjamin Britten, Frederick Delius and Arnold Schoenberg. For the last twenty years of his life he was professor of violin at his alma mater, the Royal Academy of Music in London.

== Early years ==
Ralph Holmes was born in Penge in South London on 1 April 1937. He studied the violin with David Martin at the Royal Academy of Music (RAM) in London and subsequently in Paris with George Enescu (who had taught Yehudi Menuhin) and in New York with Ivan Galamian (teacher of Kyung Wha Chung, Itzhak Perlman and Pinchas Zukerman).

At the age of thirteen Holmes made his concert début in January 1951, in an Ernest Read children's concert in London, as soloist in Mendelssohn's Violin Concerto. He subsequently won prizes at international competitions in Paris in 1957 and Bucharest in 1958.

== Peak years ==
Holmes made his American début with Sir John Barbirolli and the Houston Symphony at Carnegie Hall in New York in 1966; he played Ravel's Tzigane and Vaughan Williams's The Lark Ascending.

Although Holmes became an experienced and skilled concerto soloist – he gave several hundred performances of the Beethoven Violin Concerto – as The Times put it, "he lacked the forcefulnes of temperament to make a dominating impression in a world not short of major violin virtuosi". He diversified his musical activities and performed as soloist-conductor with the Royal Philharmonic Orchestra (RPO) and the London Mozart Players and formed the Holmes Trio in 1972 with Anthony Goldstone (piano) and Moray Welsh (cello). According to Grove's Dictionary of Music and Musicians, his performances with these players "were acclaimed for their technical mastery, warmth of tone and complete stylistic conviction".

== Repertoire, recordings and RAM ==
The Times called Holmes "a notable champion of the lesser known areas of the 20th century repertory". He played concertos by Barber, Bennett, Brian, Britten, Delius and Schoenberg as well as more familiar twentieth-century concertos by composers such as Bartók, Berg, Elgar, Shostakovich and Walton.

He made fewer commercial recordings than many of his compeers, but in the studio he set down the Delius sonatas with Eric Fenby; solo sonatas by Bartók and Prokofiev; Beethoven and Hummel sonatas with Richard Burnett; and the Delius Violin Concerto with the RPO under Vernon Handley.

From 1964 until his death, Holmes was professor of violin at the RAM. He died in Beckenham in South London on 4 September 1984 at the age of 47.
