= Richard Burnett (pianist) =

British musician and collector of musical instruments (1932–2022)

Richard Leslie Burnett MBE (23 June 1932 – 8 July 2022) was an English fortepianist, collector, and museum founder known for his preservation and study of historical keyboard instruments.

== Biography ==
Born in Godstone, Surrey, Burnett was the fifth child of Joan (née Humphery) and Sir Leslie Burnett, proprietors associated with London's Hay's Wharf. He received his early education from Cheam School and Eton College. Later, he studied music at Royal Academy of Music. He earned a degree in economics and modern languages from King's College, Cambridge, in 1957.

In 1970, Burnett and his wife, writer Katrina Hendrey, purchased Finchcocks, a Georgian manor in Goudhurst, Kent. Initially, Finchcocks housed a workshop for instrument restoration and replica construction (Adlam Burnett, 1970–1980). In 1976, it became the Finchcocks Living Museum of Music, providing public access to over 100 historical keyboard instruments. The museum hosted regular events and concerts until its closure in 2016 due to high maintenance costs. Most of its collection was auctioned, though some instruments relocated to Tunbridge Wells.

Burnett recorded several notable albums, including "The Romantic Fortepiano," featuring works by composers such as Hummel, Chopin, Schubert, Schumann, and Czerny, recorded primarily on an 1826 Conrad Graf fortepiano. He collaborated with the violinist Ralph Holmes and clarinetist Alan Hacker on additional recordings.

Burnett and Katrina co-created "An Evening With Queen Victoria," a musical-theatrical production based on Victoria’s writings, performed internationally for three decades and televised by the BBC.

Burnett was appointed Member of the Order of the British Empire (MBE) in 2008 for services to music.
