= Mem Rodrigues de Briteiros =

Portuguese nobleman (c. 1225–c. 1270)

- Rico-Homen
- Born: 13th-century Portugal
- Died: 13th-century Portugal
- Spouse: Maria Anes da Veiga
- Father: Rui Gomes de Briteiros

Mem Rodrigues de Briteiros (c. 1225 – c. 1270) was a Portuguese nobleman, member of the Court of Afonso III of Portugal.

His parents were Rui Gomes de Briteiros (vassal of Afonso III) and Elvira Anes da Maia, a noble woman, descendant of Trastamiro Aboazar. His wife was Maria Anes da Veiga, daughter of João Pires da Veiga and Teresa Martins, and descendant of Mem Fernandes de Bragança.
