= Livro de Linhagens do Deão =

The Livro de Linhagens do Deão ('Lineage Book of the Dean') is a Portuguese genealogy compiled between 1337 and 1343 for an anonymous dean. It is a defence of the rights of the Portuguese nobility against royal authority, written in the aftermath of the Portuguese civil war of 1319–1324. It was an important source for the later Livro de Linhagens do Conde Dom Pedro. The text as it is preserved is only a summary of a longer text written in 1343. The epitomizer may have been Martin Anes. The summary is preserved only in a late copy in a 17th-century manuscript in Lisbon, Biblioteca Nacional da Ajuda, 47-Xlll-10, at folios 1–29.

Like the earlier Livro Velho de Linhagens, the Livro do Deão is a direct response to centralizing royal policy, in its case that of Afonso IV. The nobility is portrayed as defenders of the country against foreign interference and as leaders of the Reconquista. The 11th-century nobleman Soeiro Mendes da Maia, for example, is described as having prevented Iberia from becoming a French fief (tirou Espanha do feudo da França).
