= Igreja de São Bento da Vitória =

Church in Porto, Portugal

Coordinates: 41°08′39″N 8°36′57″W

- Igreja de São Bento da Vitória
- Location: Porto, Portugal
- Denomination: Roman Catholic

History
- Dedication: Benedict of Nursia

Igreja de São Bento da Vitória is a church in Portugal. It is classified as a National Monument.

== Gallery ==
Main façade of the church

Chancel and gilded high altarpiece

Altarpiece in the south transept

Altarpiece in the north transept

Gilded organ case with decorated pipes

Upper choir stalls decorated with gilded panels depicting scenes from the life of Saint Benedict
