= Antunes (harpsichord makers) =

Portuguese musical instrument makers

The Antunes family were Portuguese harpsichord- and early piano builders in the 18th and 19th centuries.

== Known builders of the family ==
Julião was the father of Joaquim José; he was a maker of string instruments for the royal chapel in Lisbon

Joaquim José (1731–1811) harpsichord maker in Lisbon, and the most prominent member of the family.
Manuel (1707–1796) was the brother of Joaquim José and shared a workshop with him.

João Baptista (fl.1825–1865), was the grandson of Manuel and a maker of keyboard instruments.

== Surviving instruments ==
There are four Antunes instruments still in existence. Two single manual harpsichords with disposition 8' 8' are signed by Joaquin José: one dated 1758, now in the Museu da Música, Lisbon and one dated 1785, that was in the Finchcocks collection, Goudhurst, Kent until 2016. Their other existing instruments are signed only 'Antunes', probably because they were made by Manuel and Joaquin José working together. These are a grand piano, very similar to their harpsichords in design and construction with an action like that of Bartolomeo Cristofori, made in 1767, now in the National Music Museum, Vermillion, South Dakota and a harpsichord similar to the others made in 1789 in the Museu da Música, Lisbon.

== Recordings on original instruments ==
The existing instruments have been readily seized upon by harpsichordists as the ideal instruments upon which to play the music of Portuguese and Spanish baroque composers such as Carlos Seixas and Manuel Blasco de Nebra. These recordings use original Antunes instruments:

- Carlos Seixas: Harpsichord Sonatas, played by Cremilde Rosado Fernandes (1758 instrument); Portugalsom CD 870023/PS.
- Carlos Seixas: Harpsichord Sonatas, played by Robert Woolley (1785 instrument); Amon Ra CD-SAR 43.
- Carlos Seixas: Harpsichord Sonatas, Sinfonia, Harpsichord Concerto, conducted and played by Ketil Haugsand (1758 instrument) with the Norwegian Baroque Orchestra; Virgin Veritas 45114.
- Carlos Seixas: Concerto, Sonatas, played by José Luis González Uriol (1758 instrument) and Segréis de Lisboa (conducted by Manuel Morais), Portugaler 2003-2
- Carlos Seixas: 12 Harpsichord Sonatas, played by Rui Paiva (1758 instrument), Philips 528 574-2
- Manuel Blasco de Nebra: Sonatas & Pastorelas, played by Carole Cerasi (1785 instrument); Metronomist MET1064.
- Lodovico Giustini di Pistoia: Sonate da Cimbalo di Piano, e Forte, detto volgarmente di Martelletti (Firenze, 1732), played by Cremilde Rosado Fernandes (1767 pianoforte), Numérica - NUM 1047
- Carlos Seixas: Harpsichord Sonatas (complete recording, vol. I), played by José Carlos Araújo (1758 instrument); Melographia Portugueza CD 12/001, MPMP.
- Carlos Seixas: Harpsichord Sonatas (complete recording, vol. III), played by José Carlos Araújo (1758 instrument); Melographia Portugueza CD 13/003, MPMP.

== Sources ==
- John Koster (with Gerhard Doderer): 'Antunes', Grove Music Online ed. L. Macy (Accessed 2007-05-23), http://www.grovemusic.com/
- Donald H. Boalch: Makers of the Harpsichord and Clavichord 1440-1840, Oxford University Press ASIN: 019318429X; 3rd edition (1995)
- Raymond Russell: The Harpsichord and Clavichord (London, 1959)
- Gerhard Doderer & John Henry van der Meer, Cordofones de tecla portugueses do séc XVIII: clavicórdios, cravos, pianofortes e espinetas / Portuguese string keyboard instruments of the 18th century: clavichords, harpsichords, fortepianos and spinets (bilingual edition), Lisboa, Fundação Calouste Gulbenkian, 2005

== See also ==
List of historical harpsichord makers
