= Ana Passos =

Portuguese politician and biologist (born 1967)

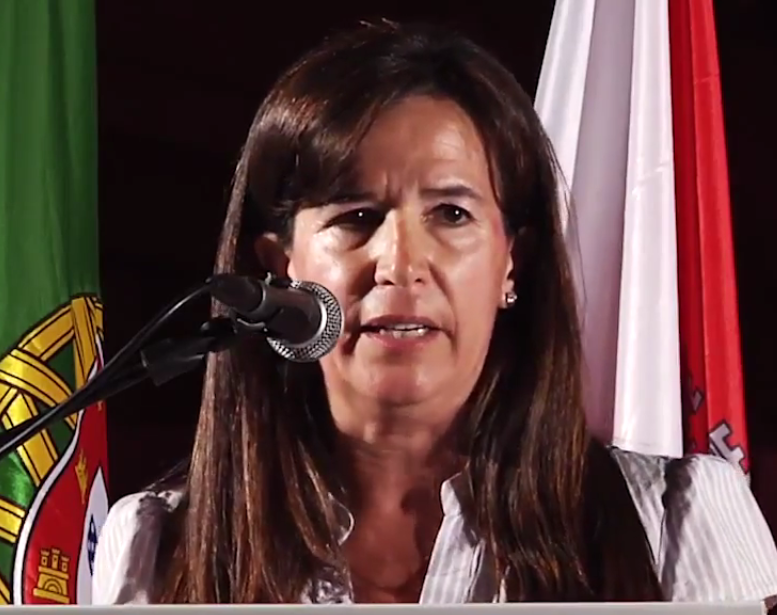
- Ana Passos in 2013.

Member of the Assembly of the Republic of Portugal
- In office 25 October 2015 – 28 March 2022
- Constituency: Faro

Member of the Municipal Assembly of Faro
- In office 20 October 2009 – 12 September 2013
- In office 11 October 2017 – 27 October 2025

Personal details
- Born: 30 May 1967 (age 59) Faro, Portugal
- Party: Socialist Party
- Education: University of Algarve; University of Leicester
- Occupation: Politician; biologist

Ana Lúcia Silva de Passos (European Portuguese: [ˈɐ.nɐ ˈlu.sjɐ ˈsil.vɐ dɨ ˈpa.suʃ]; born 30 May 1967) is a politician and biologist. From 2015 to 2021, she was a member of the Assembly of the Republic of Portugal. From 2009 to 2013, and from 2017 to 2025, Passos was a member of the municipal assembly of Faro. She belongs to the Socialist Party

== Biography ==
Ana Passos was born on 30 May 1967 in Faro in Algarve, Portugal. She graduated the University of Algarve in Faro in a bachelor's degree in marine biology and fisheries, and a master's degree in genetics and molecular biology from the University of Leicester in England.

Passos belongs to the Socialist Party. From 20 October 2009 to 12 September 2013, and from 11 October 2017 to 27 October 2025, she was a member of the municipal assembly of Faro. From 2013 to 2017, she was the treasurer of the Union of Parishes of Faro.

In 2015, she was elected to the Assembly of the Republic Portugal, representing the constituency of Faro. Passos was reelected in 2019, and served until 2022. She was a member of the Foreign Affairs and Portuguese Communities Committee, and the Budget, Finance, and Administrative Modernisation Committee, and was a substitute on the Agriculture and Sea Committee.

From 2022 to 2024, she was the president of the Algavre division of the Socialist Women–Equality and Rights, a women political organisation subsident to the Socialist Party.

Passos unsuccessfully sought to become the candidate for the president of the Faro Municipal Assembly on the Socialist Party electoral list in the 2025 election.
