= Holy Martyrs of Lisbon =

Christian martyrs (d. 303)

Saints Verissimus, Maxima, and Julia
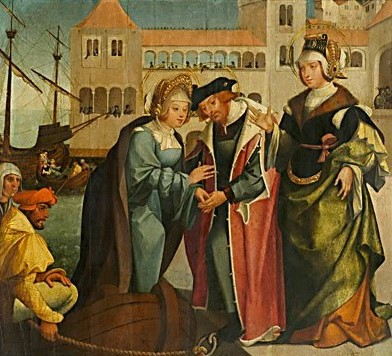
- Verissimus, Maxima, and Julia disembark in Lisbon (Garcia Fernandes, c. 1530)

Martyrs
- Died: c. 303; Olisipo, Lusitania (modern-day Lisbon, Portugal)
- Venerated in: Roman Catholic Church; Eastern Orthodox Church
- Major shrine: Parish Church of Santos-o-Velho, Lisbon
- Feast: 1 October

The Holy Martyrs of Lisbon (Portuguese: Santos Mártires de Lisboa) were three Christian siblings, Verissimus, Maxima, and Julia, executed in Olisipo in the Roman province of Lusitania (modern-day Lisbon, Portugal), during the Diocletianic Persecution.

The martyrdom of Verissimus, Maxima, and Julia is the subject of a series of paintings by Garcia Fernandes, painted c. 1530.

== History ==
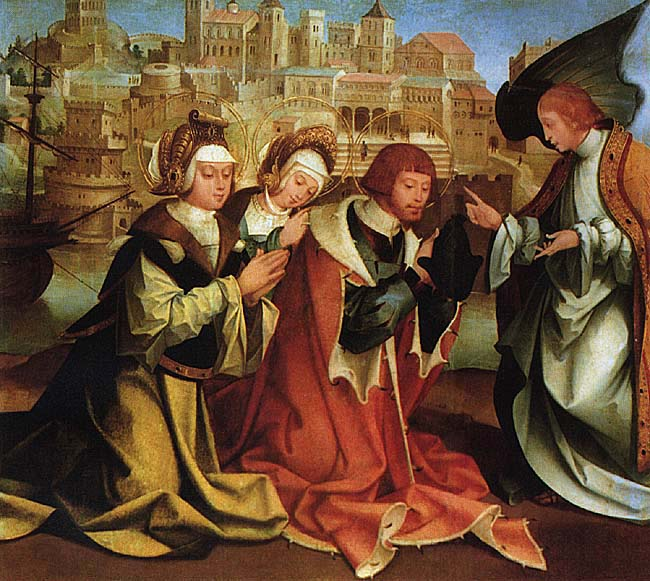
Annunciation of the Martyrdom of the Holy Martyrs of Lisbon (Garcia Fernandes, c. 1530). Carlos Machado Regional Museum, Ponta Delgada, Azores.

The first known historical references to the three saints can be found in the 8th-century Martyrology of Usuard. The city's ancient devotion to the martyrs Verissimus, Maxima, and Julia is also attested in De expugnatione Lyxbonensi, an account of the Siege of Lisbon at the start of the Second Crusade.

Most accounts of the lives of the Holy Martyrs of Lisbon maintain that the three siblings were in Rome when an angel appeared unto them and told them to go to Olisipo, where they "would achieve the crown of martyrdom that they so eagerly sought." They journeyed by boat to the city, and soon enough were taken to the presence of Tarquinius, Roman governor under Diocletian; having voiced their will to suffer martyrdom to uphold the Christian faith, Tarquinius subjected them to a series of torments after which they were stoned and their throats slit.
