= Finchcocks =

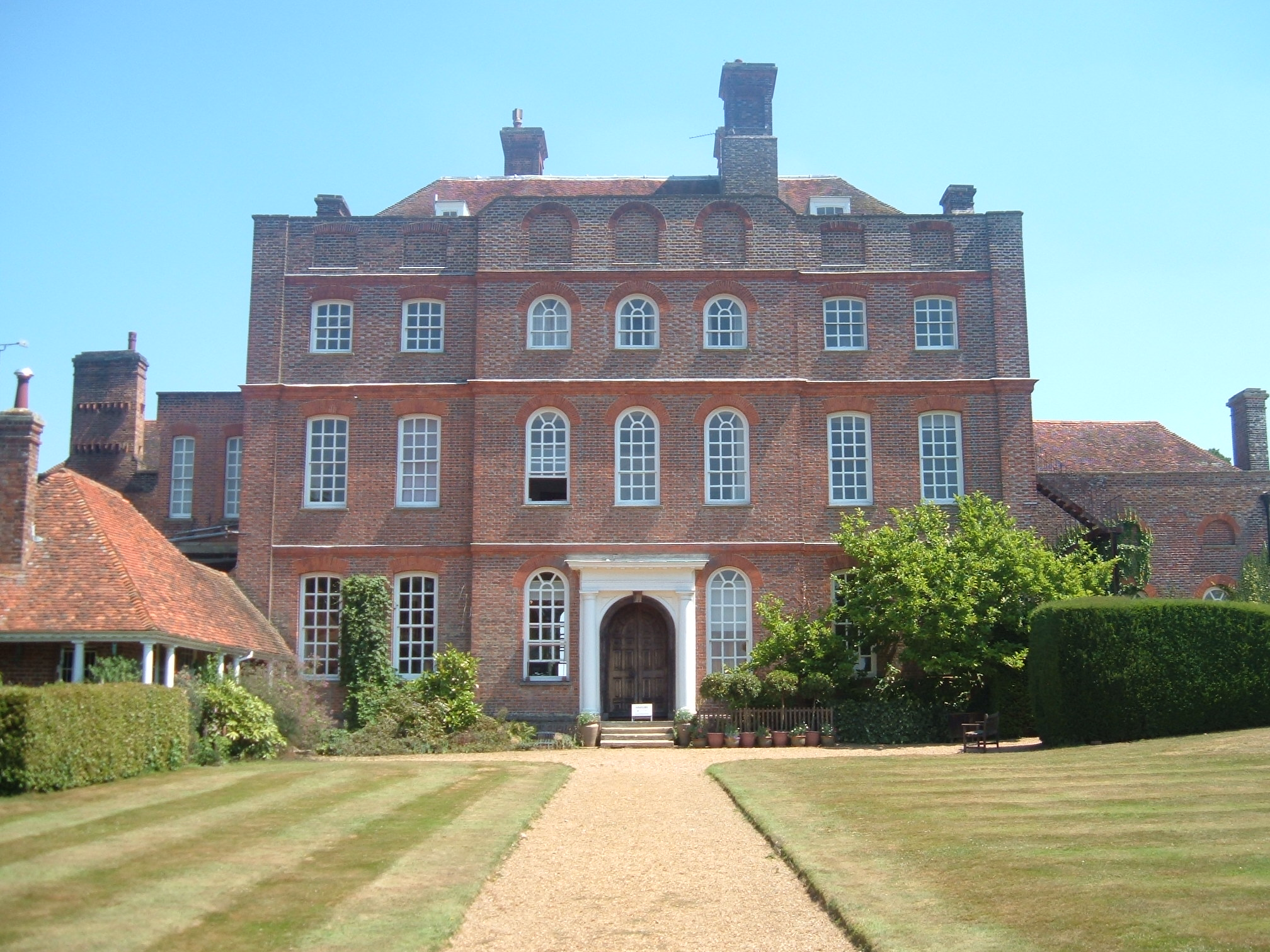
- View of the rear of the house, from the garden

- Location within Kent

General information
- Type: House
- Architectural style: Georgian
- Classification: Grade I listed
- Location: Finchcocks, Goudhurst, Kent, United Kingdom
- Coordinates: 51.1022°N 0.4273°E
- Completed: 1725

Technical details
- Floor area: 15,387 square feet (1,429.5 m^{2})

Listed Building – Grade I
- Designated: 9 June 1952
- Reference no.: 1318935

Finchcocks is an early Georgian manor house in Goudhurst, Kent. For 45 years it housed a large, visitor-friendly museum of historical keyboard instruments, displaying a collection of harpsichords, clavichords, fortepianos, square pianos, organs and other musical instruments. The museum was run by the owners of the house, Richard and Katrina Burnett until 2017. It is now owned by Neil and Harriet Nichols who use it as a family home and a venue for residential piano courses and classical concerts.

== Ownership ==
The house was built in 1725 and named after the family who lived on the site in the 13th century.

Finchcocks was owned by Edward Horden, whose family crest lies above the front door. Edward was Clerk of the Green Cloth - a secretary to the board that was responsible for organising royal journeys and auditing the Royal Household accounts for three monarchs, Edward VI, Mary I and Elizabeth I.

The current house was built for Edward Bathurst (1680-1772), a London barrister and Master of the Middle Temple. Edward resided there until his death, before which he conveyed the estate to Charles, son of his second marriage. Charles died in 1767 at which point the estate passed onto this brother, Richard Bathurst, a minor canon of Rochester Cathedral, who resided there until 1796. The University College London Legacies of British Slavery database details the fact that, as well as inheriting Finchcocks, he inherited a plantation in Jamaica with 56 slaves; 35 men, 21 women and 8 children.

Finchcocks was sold to Robert Springett (1753 – 1826) in 1797, a local landowner who enlarged the estate from 210 to 344 acres.

In 1863, Richard Springett sold the property to his neighbour Edward Hussey of Scotney Castle.

In the period of Hussey's ownership, the property was rented to Sir James Stirling who lived at Finchcocks from 1882. During this time the property was visited by Siegfried Sassoon, who described the house in his memoirs The Weald of Youth.

During the Second World War pupils and teachers from King's School, Rochester lodged there before the house was requisitioned by the army.

From 1960 - 1970, the property was a school for The Legat Ballet - Nicolas Legat and his wife Nadine Nicolava Legat, who brought the classical Russian style of ballet to the UK in 1923.

After wartime use for military purposes and a period of institutional use in the 1960s, the house was acquired in 1971 by Richard and Katrina Burnett, who restored it and in 1976 opened it as both a museum housing their collection of historic keyboard instruments and a centre for concerts and other musical events.

When they decided to retire and downsize in 2015, much of the important collection was dispersed at auction, but Finchcocks itself was sold to another musical couple, Neil and Harriet Nichols, who run courses for pianists at the house and host charitable concerts, as well as making it their home.

== Architecture ==
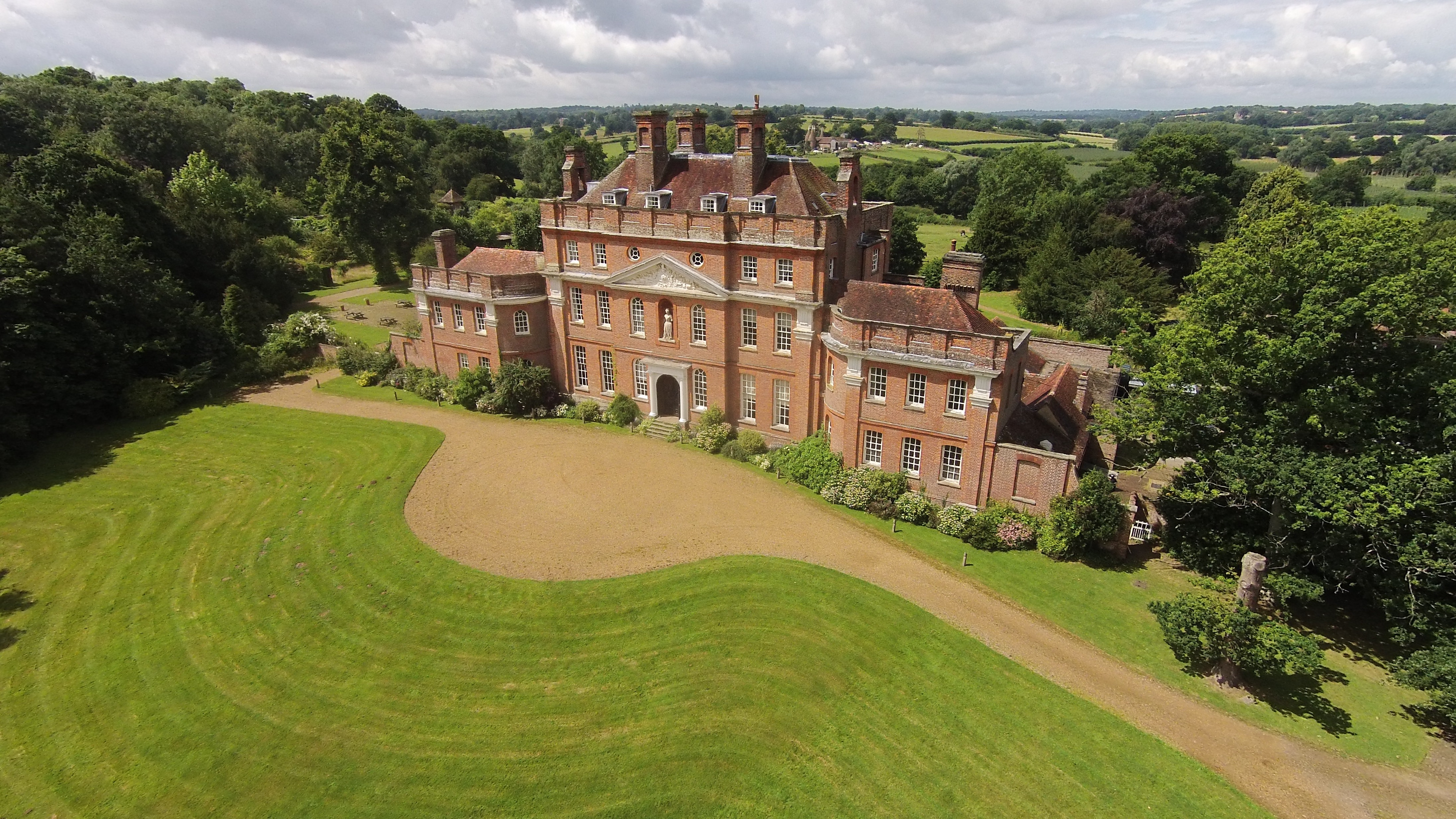
Aerial view of East elevation of Finchcocks

The property is noted for its brickwork and has a dramatic front elevation attributed to Thomas Archer. It is located in 25 acres (10 ha) of grounds. There is parkland to the front and a garden to the rear with wide formal lawns, mature shrub borders, an orchard for wild flowers, and a Grade II listed walled garden and summerhouse. To the east and west of the property lies a Grade II listed Ha-ha. There are extensive views over the Kentish landscape of park, farmland, and hop-gardens.

The house has an elongated rectangular main block with curved and projecting flanking wings in the English Baroque style. The imposing front façade displays a painted moulded cornice supported on Tuscan corner pillars and a pediment containing the Bathurst coat of arms. The rear (west) elevation is of simpler composition with a plinth and plat band around pillars which mirror the front elevation. Within the house, the vaulted cellar was said to have been so extravagantly built as to have delayed the erection of the wings. The main building has four storeys above the cellar, with a central hall running the full depth of the house.

Notable architectural similarities exist with nearby Matfield House, as well as other buildings where Archer is known to be the architect including Chettle House and Marlow Place.

== Events and broadcasts ==
The rooms within, with their high ceilings and oak panelling, provided an ideal setting for music performed on period instruments; the house and instruments were used regularly for recordings by leading exponents of early music such as Trevor Pinnock, Simon Preston and Nigel North.

Broadcasts and events at the property have featured on BBC Radio 3, BBC music magazine, the pianist magazine and Classic FM. It was also the location for the filming of The Amazing Mr Blunden directed by Mark Gatiss for Sky Movies.

== The Finchcocks collection ==
Finchcocks was acquired by Richard Burnett, a fortepianist, in 1970. The Adlam Burnett workshop (founded by Derek Adlam and Richard Burnett) was set up at the house and enabled instrument makers to produce copies of historical keyboard instruments in an ideal environment, learning from the construction of many originals. The building housed the Katrina and Richard Burnett collection of over 100 historical keyboard instruments; about forty of which were fully restored to playing condition. These could be seen and heard whenever the house was open to the public; it was one of the few collections of historical instruments at which people were welcome to play them themselves. With the Burnetts' retirement in 2015, the museum closed and many of its instruments were auctioned off for charity. The auction catalogue documented the instruments meticulously and in the auction many fetched two or three times the estimated prices. A total of £835,462 was raised from the sale of the collection.

Fourteen instruments from the collection were retained and form the Richard Burnett Heritage Collection, to be housed in 2018 at the Burnetts' home in Tunbridge Wells.

Similarly, there is a collection of musical pictures, prints and an exhibition on the theme of London's 18th-century pleasure gardens such as Vauxhall and Ranelagh Gardens.

== Historical instruments in the collection ==
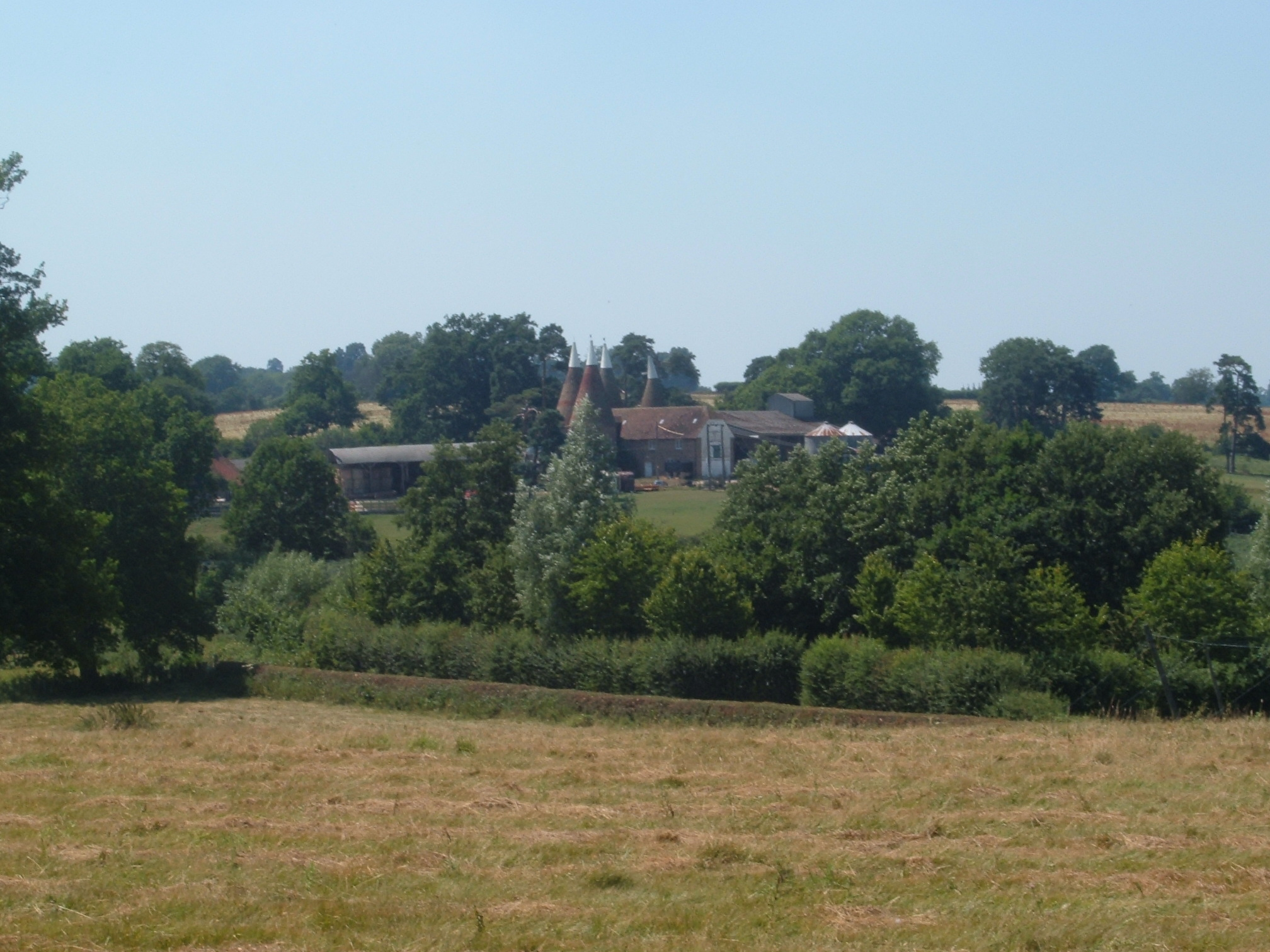
View of the Kent countryside from Finchcocks

=== Clavichords ===
- Lindholm and Söderström: unfretted, 1806
- Georg Friedrich Schmahl: fretted, 1807

=== Harpsichords ===
- Joachim Antunes: single manual, 1785
- Thomas Blasser: double manual, 1744
- C.A.: bentside spinet, c.1700
- Fr. Ant. L.: single manual, 1716
- Gregori: single manual, c.1697
- Onofrio Guarracino: virginal, 1668
- Jacob Kirckman: double manual, 1756
- Joseph Mahoon: bentside spinet, 1742 (today in Geelvinck Early Piano Museum, Amsterdam, Netherlands)

=== Organs ===
- Anon: chamber organ, c.1680; chamber organ, c.1790; miniature free-reed organ, c.1860
- Alexandre Père et Fils: harmonium, 1859
- Autophone Company: cob organ (portable free-reed barrel organ), c.1885
- John Avery: chamber organ, 1792
- William Ayton: barrel organ, c.1800
- John Byfield: chamber organ, 1766
- Longman and Broderip: barrel organ, c.1790

=== Pianos ===
- Anon: portable square piano, c.1815; lyre piano (possibly Schleip, Berlin), c.1825; domestic barrel piano, 19th century
- Gustaf and Wilhelm Andersson: barrel piano, c.1890
- Bayes and Company: square piano, 1793
- Frederick Beale: upright euphonicon, c.1842
- Adam Beyer: square piano, 1777
- John Brinsmead and Sons: upright, c.1855
- John Broadwood and Son: grand, 1792; square, 1795; square, 1798; grand, 1801; square, c.1805
- John Broadwood and Sons: grand, c.1810; square, c.1820; grand, 1823; cabinet upright, c.1830; grand, 1846; square, 1858; grand, 1859 (now at Hammerwood Park, East Grinstead, Sussex); upright, c.1870
- Muzio Clementi and Company: grand, c.1800; upright grand, 1804; square, c.1815; square, c.1815; square, c.1815; grand, c.1815; grand, c.1821; grand, 1822; cabinet upright, c.1825; cabinet upright, c.1825
- Collard and Collard: square, c.1835; grand, c.1835; grand, c.1840
- William Edwards: cabinet upright, c.1825
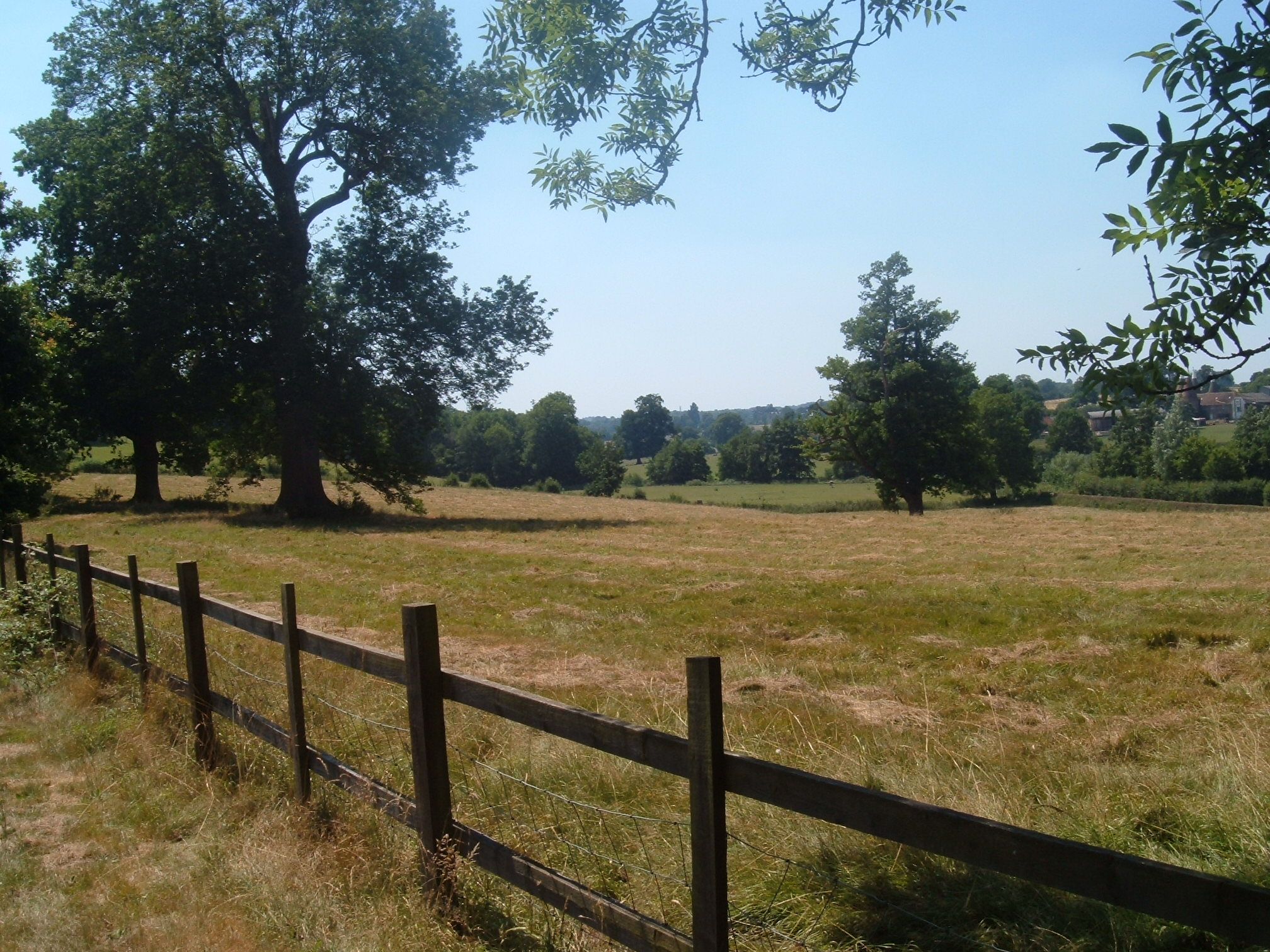
  Another view from Finchcocks
- W.J. Ennever and Son: upright, c.1850
- Sébastien Érard: square, 1792
- Erard Frères: grand, 1801
- Erard: upright, c.1860; grand, 1866
- Johann Fritz: grand, c.1815
- Christopher Ganer: square, c.1780; square, 1784
- Conrad Graf: grand, c.1820; grand, 1826
- Crang Hancock: transverse grand, 1779
- Carl Henschker: grand, c.1840
- Mathias Jakesch: grand, 1832
- Jones, Round and Company: upright grand, c.1810 (today in Geelvinck Early Piano Museum, Amsterdam, Netherlands and on loan at Huis Midwoud, Midwoud)
- William Kearsing: square, c.1830
- Knowles and Allen: square, c.1805
- Sebastian Lengerer: grand, 1793
- Longman, Lukey and Company: square, c.1780
- Frederick Mathuschek: square, 1873
- Sébastien Mercier: upright, 1831
- Henri Pape: upright piano-console, 1841; upright piano-console, 1843
- Ignace Pleyel et Compagnie: upright, c.1840; grand, 1842
- Michael Rosenberger: grand, c.1800
- Leopold Sauer: pyramid piano, c.1805
- William Southwell: upright square, c.1800
- Robert Stodart: grand, 1787
- William and Matthew Stodart: grand, 1802 (now at Hammerwood Park, East Grinstead, Sussex); square, 1807
- Johann Baptist Streicher: grand, 1867 (today in Geelvinck Early Piano Museum, Amsterdam, Netherlands)
- Anton Walter und Sohn: square, c.1800
- Wilson: square, 1789
- Robert Woffington: upright, c.1800 (today in Geelvinck Early Piano Museum, Amsterdam, Netherlands)
- Johannes Zumpe and Gabriel Buntebart: square, 1769 (today in Geelvinck Early Piano Museum, Amsterdam, Netherlands)

=== Others ===
- Anon: cylinder musical box with drum and bells, c.1895
- Busson: piano accordion, c.1850
- Chappell and Company: keyboard crystallophone (or 'pianino'), c.1815 (today in Geelvinck Music Museum, Zutphen, Netherlands); digitorium, c.1870
- Paul Lochmann: symphonion (disc musical box), c.1895
- Thomas Machell and Sons: dulcitone, c.1920 (today in Geelvinck Music Museum, Zutphen, Netherlands)
- J Tait: angelica (musical glasses), c.1815

== Related publications ==
- Burnett, R: English Pianos at Finchcocks, Early Music (1985)
- Burnett, K and R: Finchcocks Past & Present (2003)
- Dow, W: Finchcocks Collection, Catalogue: the Richard Burnett Collection of Historical Keyboard *Instruments (1989)

== See also ==
- List of music museums
