= Teresa Aço =

Portuguese stage actress

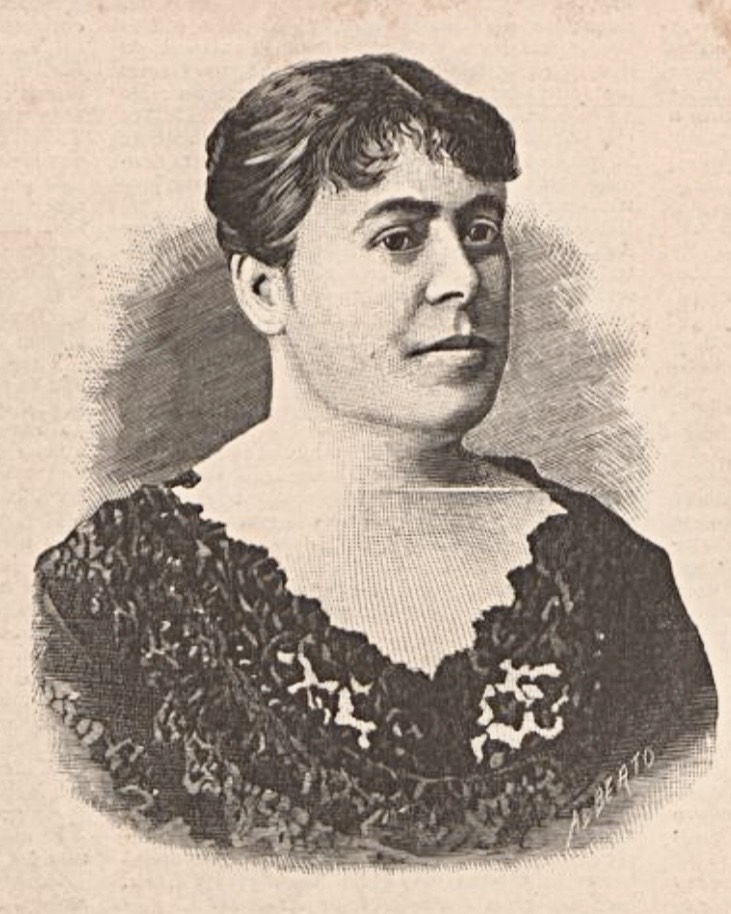
- Born: 18 May 1852; Silves, Portugal
- Died: 13 May 1892 (aged 39); Porto, Portugal
- Other name: Teresa Aço Taveira
- Occupation: Actor
- Years active: 10
- Known for: Portuguese theatre
- Spouse: Afonso Taveira

Teresa Aço Taveira (1852 – 1892) was a Portuguese actress.

== Early life ==
Teresa Aço Taveira was born on 18 May 1852 at Silves, a town in the Algarve region of Portugal. She was orphaned at a young age and was left being responsible for three younger sisters, one of whom, Dores Aço, also became an actress. To earn a living, she worked as a seamstress. She made her debut at the Teatro Gil Vicente, Lagos in the region of Algarve but then moved to the Teatro Lethes, in Faro, where she performed more important roles.

== Career ==
While performing in Faro, Aço was seen by two famous Portuguese actors, Actor Isidoro and Actor Taborda who advised her to try her luck on the stage in the capital, Lisbon. Actor Polla, an actor and director who was directing a play in which she appeared, wanted to take her to Lisbon, but she still resisted. It was only after she met her husband, the actor-entrepreneur, pt: Afonso Taveira, that she agreed to go to Lisbon, together with her husband. They had married in Silves on 24 December 1880.

Having corrected some minor speech defects, in 1881 Aço joined the D. Maria II National Theatre in Lisbon. A year later she followed her husband to Porto, where she stayed until 1885, playing important roles at the Teatro Baquet and other theatres, and establishing a good reputation, performing in plays by Émile Zola, Alexandre Dumas, and Alexandre Dumas fils, among others. When they left Porto, Aço and her husband went on a tour to the Azores archipelago. Returning to Porto, she and her husband worked at the Teatro do Príncipe Real (now the Teatro Sá da Bandeira). She retired around 1885.

== Death ==
Aço died on 13 May 1892 following an oophorectomy made necessary by an illness that had lasted for three years. Her body was taken to Porto where it was received by actors and the band of Porto's volunteer firefighters. The music at the funeral was provided by the Teatro do Principe Real orchestra.
