= Nuno Montenegro =

Portuguese architect

Nuno Montenegro (born 1970, Lisbon, Portugal) is architect from the University of Lisbon (1995) having studied in Italy with Vittorio Gregotti and Aldo Rossi at Università Iuav di Venezia (IUAV). Master in Urban Regeneration (2010). and Ph.D. candidate in Urban Planning (FAUL) he is a research member of the City Induction project (ICIST) (R&D. FCT). His scientific work has been widely published and cited in the field of technologies applied to architecture and urban planning Nuno Montenegro professional experience spans nearly two decades of activity. Its projects and plans stand today published in many countries, in internationally recognized magazines such as Interior Design magazine (IDM) New York (2010) and ArquitecturaViva (AV) Madrid (2008) among many others. Awarded in several International Competitions and Events has been invited to participate in conferences, lectures, seminars and exhibitions worldwide. Since 2014 Nuno Montenegro teaches Architectural Design at the Faculty of Architecture of the University of Lisbon.
