= Rui Nepomuceno =

Rui Nepomuceno ComIH
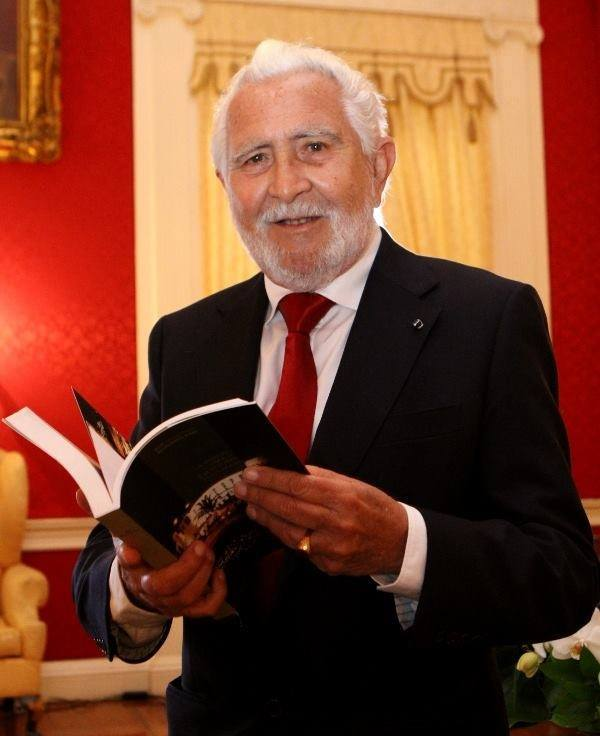
- Born: 10 May 1936; Funchal
- Died: 18 April 2024 (aged 87); Funchal
- Education: University of Coimbra
- Occupations: Lawyer, Politician, Historian
- Known for: Authorship of several books on the economic and political history of Madeira
- Notable work: História da Madeira: uma visão actual.
- Political party: Portuguese Communist Party
- Spouse: Aida Maria Brito Figueiroa Góis
- Children: 4
- Parents: João Nepomuceno (father); Maria da Paixão de Faria Nepomuceno (mother)

Rui Firmino Faria Nepomuceno ComIH (Funchal, 10 May 1936 - Funchal, 18 April 2024) was a Madeira-born Portuguese lawyer, politician and historian.

== Biography ==
=== Early years ===
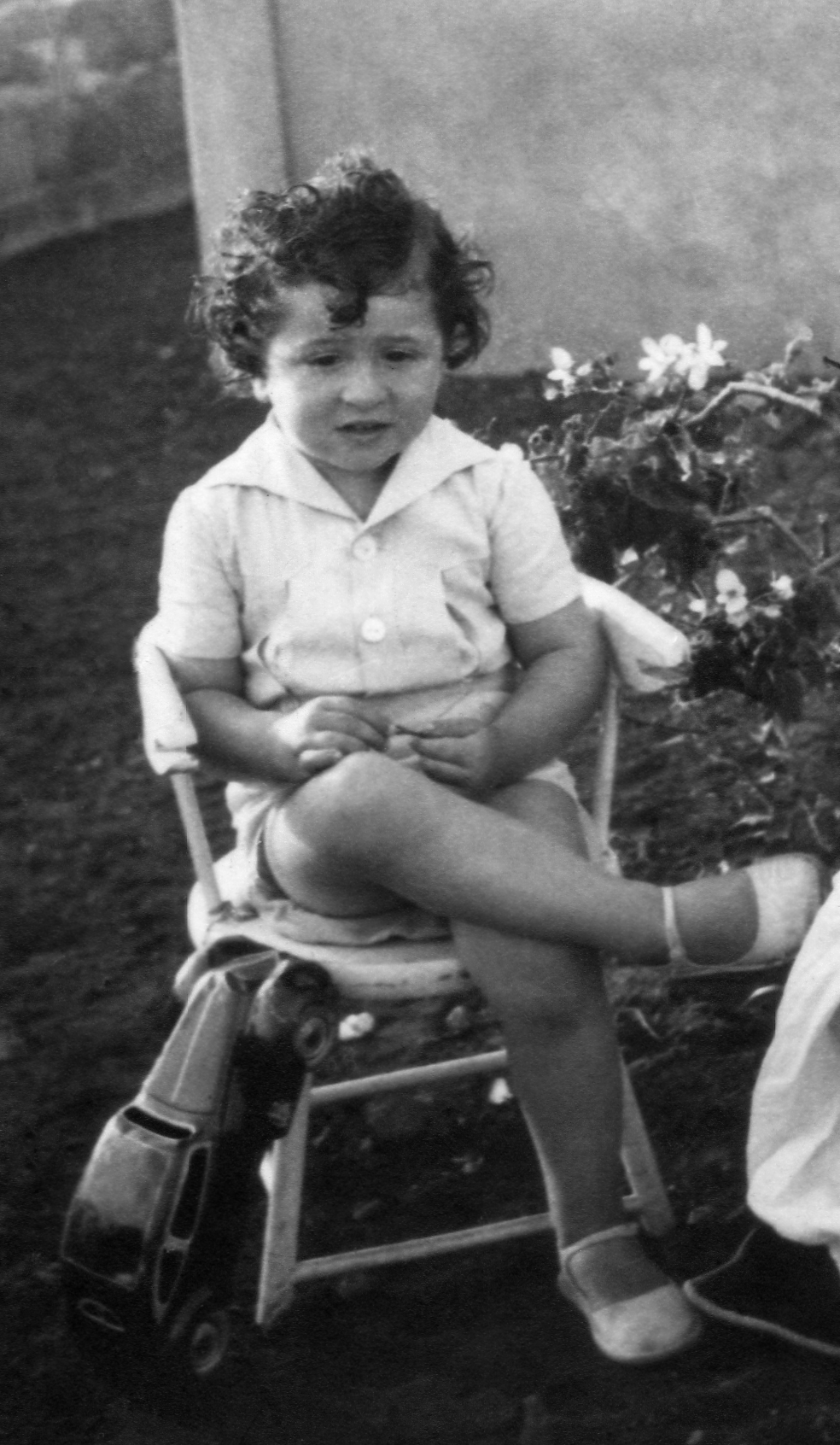
Nepomuceno as a young boy.

The son of embroidery industrialist João Nepomuceno and Maria da Paixão de Faria Nepomuceno, he was born in Santa Maria Maior, Funchal, Madeira, on 10 May 1936.

Rui Nepomuceno was born into a bourgeois family, the eldest of five siblings.

He lived in a traditional Madeiran quinta on Rua Coronel Cunha in Santa Maria Maior, Funchal.

=== Academic career ===
Initially, Rui Nepomuceno attended Colégio Nun'Alvares, known as Caroço, where he completed his primary education. He went on to study at the Liceu Nacional in Funchal. He then attended the Grande Colégio Universal in Porto, finishing at the Colégio Almeida Garrett.

At the end of his high school studies, in 1957, he applied for Legal Sciences at the Faculty of Law of the University of Coimbra.

During his time in Coimbra, he quickly became involved in the student movement and the fight against the regime. He took part in the academic struggles against the Salazar dictatorship, accompanying communist students in a mix of “bohemia and political activism”.

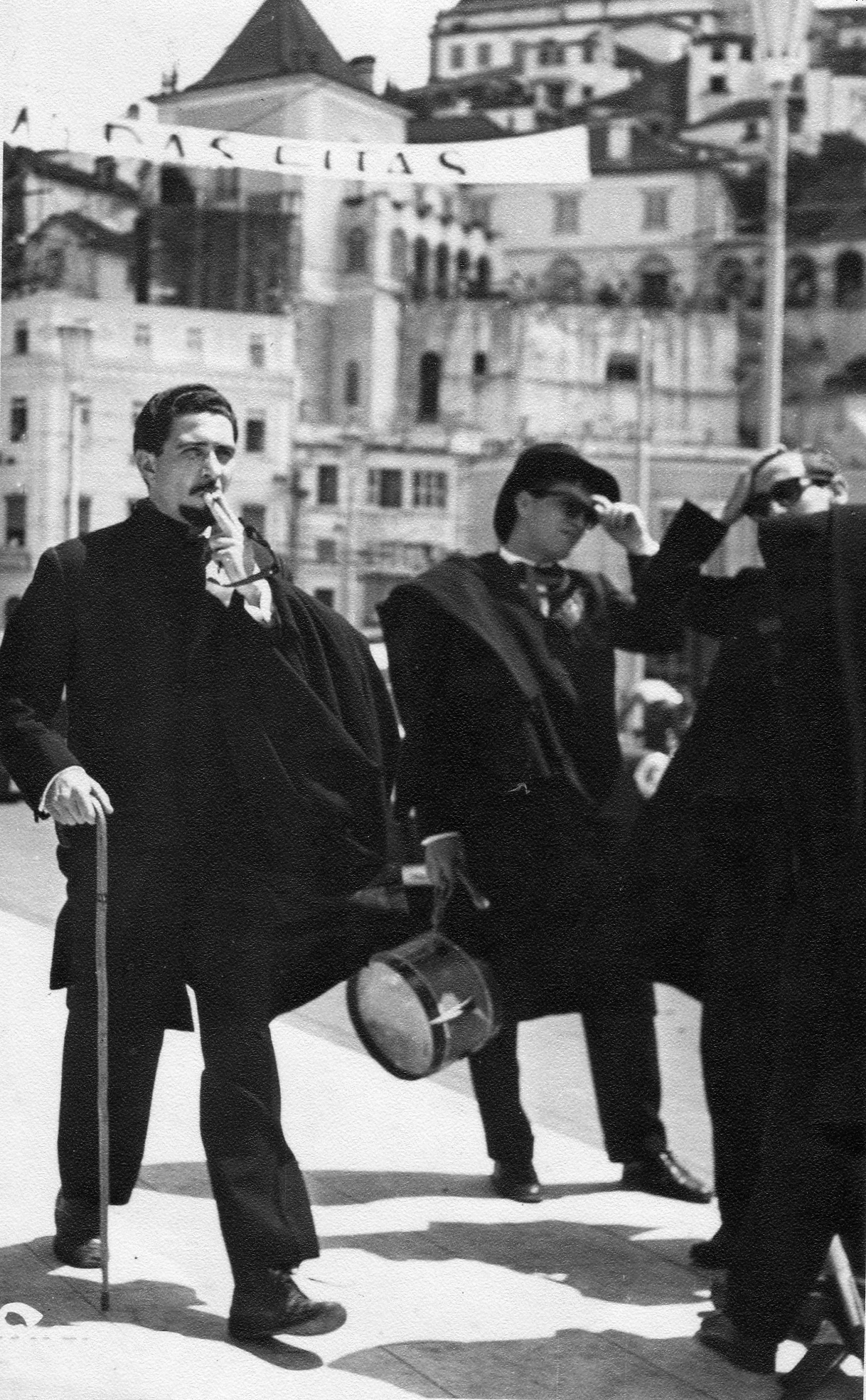
Nepomuceno as a University student.

In 1960, Nepomuceno supported the opposition ticket that won the elections for the Academic Association of Coimbra over the Situationists, with Carlos Manuel Natividade da Costa Candal (1938–2009) elected as President of the board, at a time when student protests against to the Estado Novo regime and the Colonial War erupted. In the same group, there were other supporters, for example Manuel Alegre (1936), José Carlos Vasconcelos (1940), Fernando Assis Pacheco (1937–1995), José Augusto de Silva Marques (1938–2016) and other protagonists of the struggles academics.

In 1958 he belonged to the Support Committee for Dr. Arlindo Vicente (1906–1977) - a lawyer proposed by the Communist Party - to the elections for the Presidency of the Republic, who ended up giving up in favor of the unitary candidacy of General Humberto Delgado (1906–1965).

=== Colonial War ===
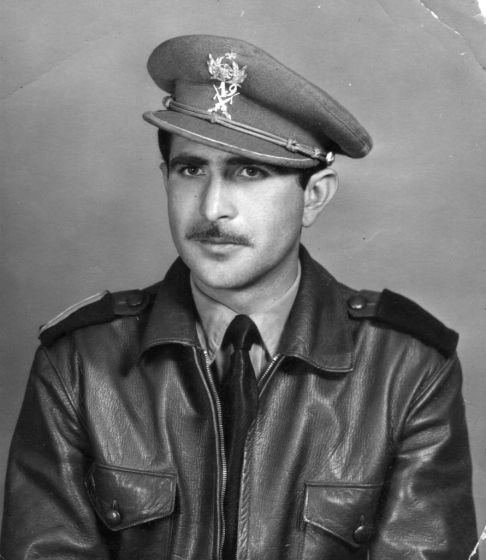
Nepomuceno during his military years.

Even before the outbreak of war, Nepomuceno interrupted his university studies in 1959 to attend the Militia Officers' Training Course at the Infantry Training School in the Mafra Convent. According to the Military Lieutenant's Individual File, Rui attended the Course from September 5, 1959 to January 30, 1960. Promoted to midshipman, he served in the 19th Infantry Battalion of Funchal.

Shortly after becoming available, in April 1961, Nepomuceno was called up to report to the Barracks of the Infantry Regiment no. 4 in the Algarve, in Faro, with the purpose of commanding the 1st platoon of the Companhia de Caçadores no. º 167, then commanded by Captain Mário Firmino Miguel (1932–1991), mobilized to fight in Angola.

After a short hesitation, as he considered himself a defender of people's rights to self-determination and independence, he decided to leave for the unknown that was this war and not take refuge abroad, as many young people descended from wealthy families did.

In fact, Nepomuceno had the economic possibilities to do what many did at the time: the leap into exile in France. But he didn't.

In this sense, he joined the Battalion of Hunters No. 159, led by Lieutenant Colonel Carlos Fernando Teixeira da Câmara Lomelino, a Madeiran who was replaced in October 1961 by Lieutenant Colonel of Infantry Manuel Pereira Espadinha Milreu.

Mobilized in Angola, he shared with his wife, Aida Maria Brito Figueiroa Góis Nepomuceno, a fellow Madeiran.

During his military service, he also tried to move politically. In Angola, in 1962, he joined the Communist Party, at the invitation of Manuel Alegre.

=== The "Lawyer of the Poor" ===
After obtaining his law degree, he settled in Funchal. He registered with the Madeira Regional Council's Bar Association in 1968.

In 1990, he became a member of the Council of the Portuguese Bar Association on the list of Alcino Cabral Barreto. In 1992, he became a member of the District Council of the Portuguese Bar Association of Madeira, on 22 January; and on 18 January 2002, he became vice-president of the Deontological Council of that order.

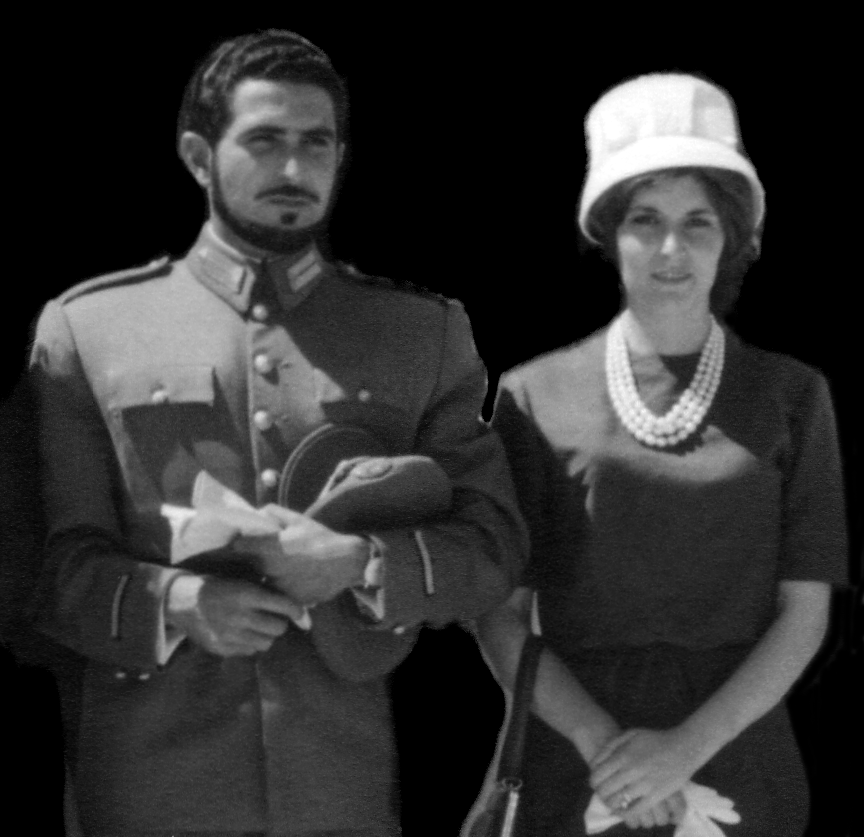
Nepomuceno with his wife.

For many years, he worked as a lawyer on Madeira Island, and is still known today as the “lawyer of the poor”. Initially, he specialized in Civil Law and Commercial Law. Later, he distinguished himself in Criminal Law.

=== Marriage and family ===
Rui Firmino Faria Nepomuceno and Aida Maria Brito Figueiroa Góis were married on May 3, 1962, at the Nossa Senhora de Fátima de Parede Church in Cascais. Together they had four children.

== Portuguese Communist Party ==
As an anti-fascist, he was active in the democratic opposition, demanding democracy and political autonomy for Madeira Island. In the 1960s and 1970s, Nepomuceno joined his allies and supporters in secret, limiting himself to participating in unitary movements, and the newspaper Comércio do Funchal.

His contribution in 1969 stands out, when he signed the historic “Letter to a Governor”, which, in addition to criticizing the regime, called for Democracy and Political Autonomy for the Madeira Archipelago.

After April 25, 1974, he committed himself to organizing the Communist Party in Madeira. He became a CDU deputy to the Regional Legislative Assembly in 1993, and President of the Civil Parish Assemblies of Santo António and São Martinho, in Funchal.

== Honours ==
During his life path, Rui Nepomuceno was honored and distinguished several times, due to his invaluable contribution to the History of Madeira.

=== National honours ===
- In 2009, on June 10, he was awarded the degree of Commander of the Order of Infante D. Henrique by the president of the republic, for his career and cultural work.

=== Regional honours ===
- On July 1, 2015, awarded the Autonomous Insignia of Valor, from the Autonomous Region of Madeira, for his performance and professional virtues.

=== Municipal honours ===
- On March 3, 2016, honored on the 437th anniversary of the Parish Council of São Martinho do Funchal.

=== Other awards and recognitions ===
- The following year, on May 19, he distinguished himself with the Medal of Honor from the Portuguese Bar Association, for his high merit and honorability in the practice of law, and also for his relevant services to the Order and in the defense of law and the Rule of Law.
- In 2012, on April 12, with the Jorge Amado Medal of Cultural Merit, from the Brazilian Institute of International Cultures, for services to Culture.
- In 2013, on November 1, he was honored by Clube Futebol União, in the celebration of União's centenary, not only for his contribution during the time he held the position of president of the board, but also in honor of his father, former president of the club.
- On May 19, 2018, he received the Medal for 50 Years of Registration at the Solemn Session to Celebrate Lawyers' Day.
- In the same year, more precisely on November 29, he became distinguished by the Government Council as one of the personalities of recognized merit, integrating the Honor Committee of the Mission Structure for the Celebrations of the 600th anniversary of the Discovery of Madeira and Porto Santo, belonging to the group of 47 individuals who, whether in the economic, political, sporting and religious sphere, are recognizable for their value, merit and excellent work.
- On 1 December 2018, he was honoured by the party's general secretary, Jerónimo de Sousa, at the opening session of the Communist Party's 10th Regional Congress.

== Literary work ==
From an early age, he had the desire to write about his land, to carry out real research on his region. In this sense, he carried out intense research into the historical and cultural past of the Madeira Archipelago. This investigation, which lasted decades, resulted in a range of writings left to all Madeirans, in particular, and to the Portuguese, in general. Nepomuceno he is recognized as an outstanding historian. In addition to having released nine books, he wrote more than a hundred articles of a historical, literary, political and sociological nature in various local periodicals, namely in Comércio do Funchal, in Diário de Notícias, in Funchal Notícias, Garajau, in Ilharq, in Islenha, on Margem; in Militante, in Quebra Costas, among others.

=== Publications ===
- 1994: As Crises de subsistência na História da Madeira. Lisboa: Editorial Caminho.
- 2003: Uma perspetiva da história da Madeira. Funchal: Editorial Eco do Funchal.
- 2006: História da Madeira: uma visão actual. Porto: Campo das Letras.
- 2006: A conquista da autonomia da Madeira: os conflitos dos séculos XIX e XX. Lisboa: Caminho, D. L.
- 2008: [Em coautoria com Paulino, Francisco Faria]. A Madeira vista por escritores portugueses (séculos XIX e XX). Funchal: Funchal 500 Anos.
- 2012: A Revista das Artes e da História da Madeira. Câmara de Lobos: O Liberal.
- 2014: A Madeira na Obra de Escritores Portugueses. Câmara de Lobos: O Liberal.
- 2023: O Movimento Democrático na Madeira e no Continente (Séc. XIX e Séc XX). Caniço: Jóias de Cultura.

== Death ==
Nepomuceno died on April 18, 2024, in the city of Funchal. In honor of his legacy and merit, a proposal was made to name a street in Funchal after him, and it was unanimously approved by the Municipal Assembly.
