= Jorge de Cabedo =

Portuguese jurist

Jorge de Cabedo (1525 – c. 1604) was a Portuguese jurist. Cabedo studied law at Coimbra and then came to hold the highest government offices. He was a judge of the Casa da Suplicação and on the supreme court (the Desembargo do Paço), as well as Chanceler-mor do Reino. He also headed the royal archives and served as Portuguese representative to the court of Madrid.

Among his most important scholarly works were his extensive reports of decisions by the Casa de Suplicação, the Practicarum observationum, sive Decisionum supremi senatus regni Lusitaniae. He also authored a compilation of laws, promulgated in 1603 by Philip II of Portugal, that was not repealed until 1867.
