= Maria Ascensão =

Portuguese folclorist (1926–2001)

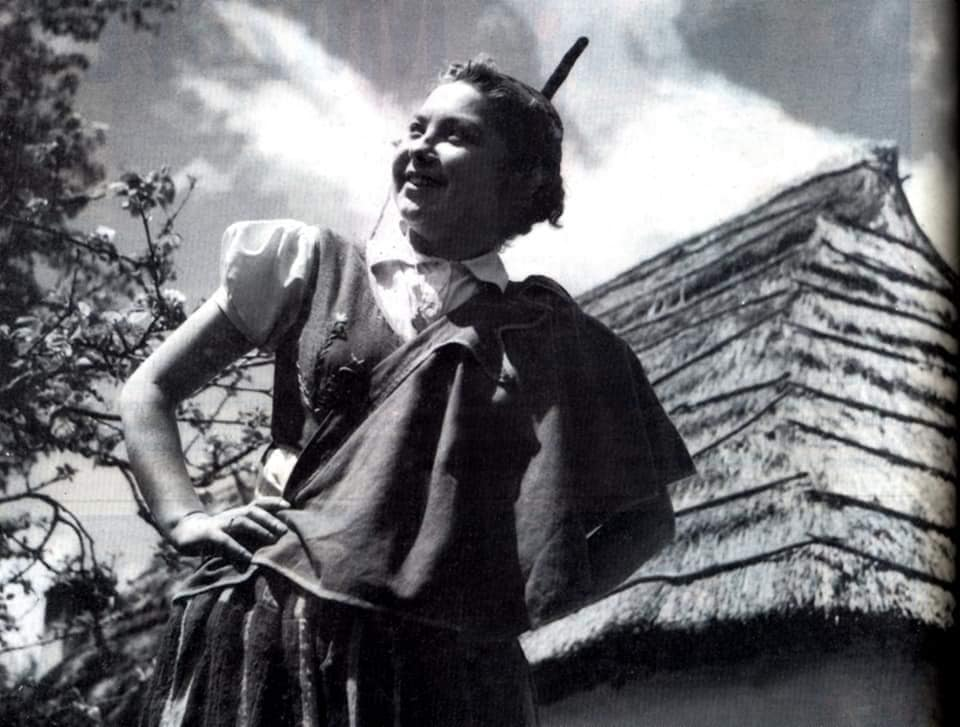
Maria Ascensão in 1949

Maria Ascensão Fernandes Teixeira (1926–2001) was a Portuguese folklorist on the island of Madeira. When she was 22, she joined the recently established Grupo Folclórico da Casa do Povo da Camacha which presented traditional songs and dances from Madeirra. Over the next 50 years, she became a leading member of the group, promoting their activities in radio interviews and documentaries. She was a key figure as the group performed at festivals and presentations in Europe, South Africa, the United States and Venezuela. She became widely respected as an authority on the oral traditions of Madeira, reviving songs and dances which had long been forgotten. Maria Ascensão is also remembered for the efforts she devoted to training members of the group.

== Early life and family ==
Born on 13 May 1926 in Camacha, Madeira, Maria Ascensão Fernandes Teixeira was the daughter of José Nicolau Fernandes Teixeira and his wife Conceição. The family's eldest child, she had two sisters and two brothers. From the age of seven she appeared in local festivities. From 1935, each year on Whit Sunday she took part as one of the main figures in the parish's processions. As for education, she attended the local primary school up to the fourth grade as was usual at the time. She also learnt textile arts, including embroidery, at the Casa do Povo da Camacha. In November 1957, she married the musician Abel Policarpo who was also a member of the Casa do Povo da Camacha Folklore Group.

== Career ==
While she initially created custom-made wedding dresses with her cousin Olivinha, her main occupation soon became her role in the Casa do Povo da Camacha Folklore Group which she joined in 1949 after being encouraged to do so by the main dancer, António Martins, and by Carlos Santos, the artistic director. She remained a passionate member of the group for the rest of her life.

Maria Ascensão managed to make the group more attractive as she brought a happier, more pleasant touch to their traditional dances while recruiting and training new members. With the assistance of her husband, she undertook leadership of the group for 42 years. Unlike similar groups, thanks to excellent presentations, meticulous music and colourful traditional costumes, Casa do Povo da Camacha remained successful as the years went by, gaining a place as one of Madeira's cultural attractions both at home and abroad.

After gaining second place at the 1949 International Dance Contest in Madrid, the group was invited to perform in mainland Portugal and in Biarritz, France, as well as at Funchal's theatre and the city's leading hotels. Ascensão was effective in interviews and musical presentations of the radio and was covered in magazine articles. Thanks to her leadership, the group gained further attention in the mid-1950s as they performed at festivals in Llangollen, Wales, and in Braga, Portugal. In 1965, they visited Johannesburg, South Africa, in 1971 Neuchâtel, Switzerland, in 1973 New Bedford, USA, and in 1978 they toured Venezuela.

In 1984, Ascensão played a key role contributing lost traditional songs and music to Madeira's Whitsuntide celebrations, gaining wide recognition for her efforts.

Maria Ascensão continued to sing and dance until the day before she died in Camacha on 18 March 2001.
