= Livro Velho de Linhagens =

Incomplete 13th century Portuguese genealogy

The Livro Velho de Linhagens ('Old Book of Lineages') is a fragmentary Portuguese genealogy of five Portuguese noble families. It was written between 1286 and 1290 by an anonymous monk of Santo Tirso Monastery for Count Martim Gil de Riba de Vizela. Originally divided into five parts, only the first and part of the second survive in a 17th-century copy, now in Lisbon, Biblioteca Nacional da Ajuda, 47-Xlll-10, at folios 30–41.

The families covered by the Livro Velho are the Sousa, Maia, Riba Douro, Baião and Bragança. The geographical scope of the text is mainly the Entre Douro e Minho in the old north of the country. The purpose is to defend the nobility against the centralizing tendencies of King Denis, especially apparent in the surveys and inquiries of 1284. The Livro Velho traces the nobility as far back as the Kingdom of Asturias.
