= Pilar Ribeiro =

Portuguese mathematician

- Born: Maria do Pilar Baptista Ribeiro; 5 October 1911; Lisbon, Portugal
- Died: 28 March 2011 (aged 99); Cascais, Portugal
- Occupation: Mathematician
- Known for: Co-founder of the Portuguese Mathematical Society
- Spouse: Hugo Baptista Ribeiro

Pilar Ribeiro (5 October 1911 – 28 March 2011) was a mathematician who was a founder of the Portuguese Mathematical Society (SPM) and also of the Gazeta de Matemática (Mathematics Gazette).

== Early life ==
Maria do Pilar Baptista Ribeiro was born in the Portuguese capital of Lisbon, on 5 October 1911, the daughter of Joaquim Rodrigues Carreira and Luísa Loureiro Peres. She graduated in Mathematics from the Faculty of Sciences of the University of Lisbon in 1933, at a time when it was still unusual for women to study such a subject. A year later, she married mathematician Hugo Baptista Ribeiro (1910–88), who she had met during the course. The couple shared an opposition to the established Estado Novo dictatorship and participated in activities of the Portuguese Communist Party. After graduating she taught mathematics in Lisbon as well as attending seminars given by the mathematician António Aniceto Monteiro. As a founding member of the Portuguese Mathematical Society, together with Bento de Jesus Caraça, she held the position of First Secretary for the 1941/1942 biennium. She returned to that same position in 1946/1947, when her husband was Secretary-General. The Mathematics Gazette, the Society’s publication, played an important role in the preservation and dissemination of the history of mathematics in Portugal and elsewhere in the 1940s.

== Exile ==
Between 1942 and 1946, she accompanied her husband to Zurich, where he studied for his PhD. Pilar Ribeiro took the opportunity to attend several specialized courses in mathematics at the Federal Polytechnic School of Zurich. When her husband stopped receiving the Portuguese scholarship to which he was entitled, she started to work so that he could complete his doctorate. She also sent papers to Gazeta de Matemática, on teaching mathematics in Switzerland. Returning to Portugal, the couple faced opposition to science on the part of the Estado Novo, which condemned independent thinking. This forced some scientists into exile. They left the country for the United States where Pilar Ribeiro taught mathematics at Pennsylvania State University. She and her husband also spent some time in Brazil, where her husband taught in Recife. Together with José da Silva Paulo, she was responsible for the translation into Portuguese of David Hilbert's classic work, Grundlagen der Geometrie (Foundations of Geometry).

== Return to Portugal ==
The couple did not return permanently to Portugal until after the Carnation Revolution on 25 April 1974, which overthrew the Estado Novo. From 1976 to 1980, at the invitation of Ruy Luís Gomes, Pilar Ribeiro was a professor at the University of Porto and at its Abel Salazar Biomedical Sciences Institute graduate school.

In January 2005, she donated her husband's estate to the National Library, consisting essentially of correspondence from national and foreign personalities, including a core of family letters and some drafts of letters sent. She died in Cascais, Portugal on 28 March 2011, a few months before she would have celebrated her 100th birthday. A Portuguese postage stamp featuring her was issued on the centenary of her birth.
