= Balu =

Balu may refer to:

== Places ==
- Balu, Kaithal, an archeological site near Kaithal, Haryana, India
- Balu, Khuzestan, a village in Khuzestan Province, Iran
- Balu, West Azerbaijan, a village in West Azerbaijan Province, Iran
- Balū, alternate name of Parcheh Balut, a village in Iran
- Balu River, Bangladesh
- Balu (Lotru), a river in Romania

== People ==
- S. N. Balagangadhara (born 1952), Indian religious philosopher and academic also known as "Balu"
- S. P. Balasubrahmanyam (born 1946), Indian singer sometimes known as "Balu"
- Balu Mahendra (1939–2014), Tamil filmmaker, screenwriter, editor and cinematographer
- Balu Sankaran (1926–2012), Indian doctor, researcher and academic
- T. R. Baalu (born 1941), Indian politician
- Balu (footballer), full name Luís Carlos Carvalho dos Reis (born 1961), Brazilian footballer

== Other uses ==
- Balu (film), 2005 Telugu film

== See also ==
- Balas (disambiguation)
- Jean Balue (c. 1421–1491), French cardinal and minister of King Louis XI
- Baloo, a main character in The Jungle Book
