= Balas (disambiguation) =

Balas is a village in Iran.

Balas may also refer to:

== People ==
- Alexander Balas, ruler of the Greek Seleucid kingdom
- Bill Balas (died 2025), American screenwriter, director, and producer
- E. Andrew Balas (born 1951), doctor
- Edith Balas (1929–2024), professor
- Egon Balas (1922–2019), applied mathematician and a professor
- Eli Balas, poker
- Eva Marija Balas (born 1941), birth name of Eva Ras
- Iolanda Balaș (1936–2016), Romanian athlete
- Iván Balás (1894–1971), Yugoslav tennis player
- Mike Balas (1910–1996), pitcher
- Mohammad Balas (born 1982), footballer

== See also ==
- Balas ruby, a rose-tinted variety of spinel
