= Baalu =

Baalu may refer to:

- T. R. Baalu (born 1941), Indian politician
- Baalu Girma (1939–1984), Ethiopian journalist and author

== See also ==
- Balu (disambiguation)
- Baalu Belagithu, a 1970 Indian Kannada-language drama film
- Baalu Jenu, a 1976 Indian Kannada-language film
