= Jean Jacod =

French mathematician

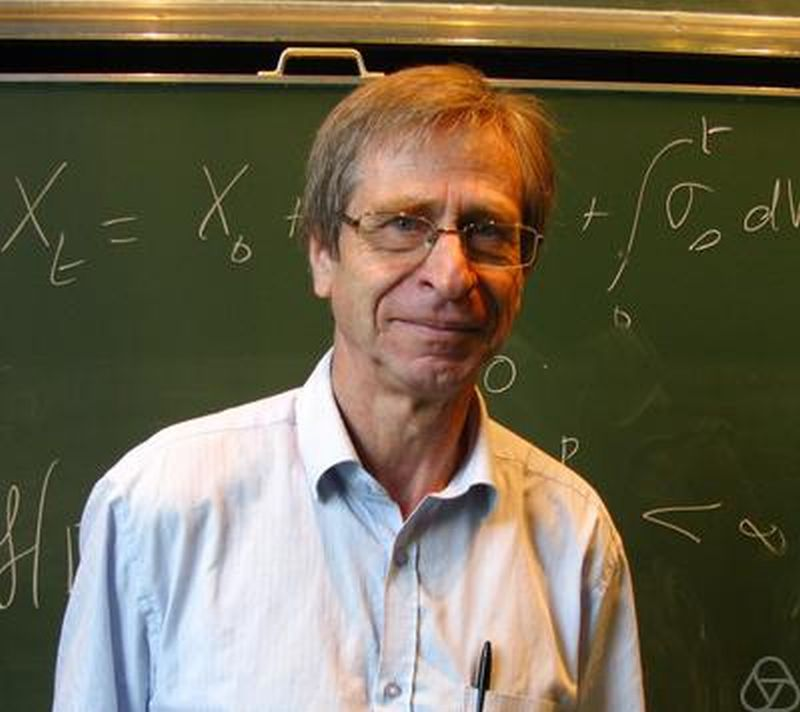
- Jacod in 2011
- Born: 13 November 1944 (age 81); France
- Education: Ecole Polytechnique
- Known for: Limit theorems for stochastic processes, Malliavin calculus for jump processes
- Awards: Gay-Lussac-Humboldt-Prize (2007)
- Scientific career
- Fields: Probability
- Workplaces: Université Pierre et Marie Curie
- Doctoral advisor: Jacques Neveu
- Doctoral students: Gilles Pages

Jean Jacod (born 13 November 1944) is a French mathematician specializing in stochastic processes and probability theory. He has been a professor at the Université Pierre et Marie Curie. He has made fundamental contributions to a wide range of topics in probability theory including stochastic calculus, limit theorems, martingale problems, Malliavin calculus and statistics of stochastic processes.

== Biography ==
Jean Jacod graduated from Ecole Polytechnique in 1965 and obtained his Doctorat d'État in Mathematics from the Université Paris-VI. His advisor was Jacques Neveu.

== Selected bibliography ==
- Jacod, Jean; Shiryaev, Albert N. (1987). Limit theorems for stochastic processes. doi:10.1007/978-3-662-05265-5. ISBN 9783540439325.
- Jacod, Jean; Protter, Philip (2012). Discretization of Processes. doi:10.1007/978-3-642-24127-7. ISBN 9783642241260.
- J. JACOD, P. PROTTER: Asymptotic error distributions for the Euler method for stochastic differential equations. Ann. Probab., 26, 267-307 (1998).
- J. JACOD: Non-parametric kernel estimation of the diffusion for a diffusion process. Scand. J. Statist. 27, 83-96 (2000).
- E. EBERLEIN, J. JACOD, S. RAIBLE: Levy term structure models: no–arbitrage and completeness. Finance and Stochastics, 9, 67–88 (2005)
- J. JACOD: Asymptotic properties of power variations of L'evy processes. ESAIM-PS, 11, 173-196 (2007).
- J. JACOD: Asymptotic properties of realized power variations and associated functionals 129-A of semimartingales. Stoch. Proc. Appl., 118, 517-559 (2008).
- Y. AIT–SAHALIA, J. JACOD: Testing for jumps in a discretely observed process. Annals of Statistics, 37, 1, 184-222 (2009).
- J. JACOD, Y. LI, P. MYKLAND, M. PODOLSKIJ, M. VETTER: Microstructure noise in the continuous case: the pre-averaging approach. Stoch. Proc. Appl., 119, 7, 2249-2276

(2009).

- J. JACOD, Z. KOWALSKI, A. NIKEGHBALI: Mod-Gaussian convergence: new limit theorems in probability and number theory. Forum Math. 23, 835-873 (2011).
- A. DIOP, J. JACOD, V. TODOROV: Central Limit Theorem for Approximate Quadratic Variations of Pure Jump Ito Semimartingales. Stoch. Proc. Appl. 123, 839-886 (2013).

== See also ==
- List of École Polytechnique alumni
