= Portugaliae Mathematica =

- Discipline: Mathematics
- Language: English
- Edited by: José Francisco Rodrigues

Publication details
- History: 1937-present
- Publisher: European Mathematical Society (Portugal)
- Frequency: Quarterly

Standard abbreviations
- ISO 4: Port. Math.

Indexing
- ISSN: 0032-5155 (print); 1662-2758 (web)
- LCCN: a41002642
- OCLC no.: 612804655

Links
- Journal homepage; Online archive (2007-present); Online archive (1937-1993) at EUDML; Online archive (1994-2006) at the European Mathematical Information Service

Portugaliae Mathematica is a peer-reviewed scientific journal published by the European Mathematical Society on behalf of the Portuguese Mathematical Society Sociedade Portuguesa de Matemática. It covers all branches of mathematics. The journal was established in 1937, by António Aniceto Monteiro, its first editor-in-chief. The journal is abstracted and indexed in Zentralblatt MATH, Mathematical Reviews, the Science Citation Index Expanded, and Current Contents/Physical, Chemical & Earth Sciences. The current editor-in-chief is José Francisco Rodrigues (Universidade de Lisboa).

== History ==
The scientific journal Portugaliae Mathematica was founded in 1937 in Lisbon by António Aniceto Monteiro—who had just completed his doctorate under René Maurice Fréchet in Paris—marking the beginning of a distinctly modernist phase in Portuguese mathematical publishing. It inaugurated a period of "mathematical effervescence" that lasted roughly a decade, during which it was successively joined by the Gazeta de Matemática in 1940 and by the newly established Centro de Estudos Matemáticos de Lisboa later that year.

Throughout the 1940s and early 1950s, Portugaliae Mathematica became the principal outlet for original research in Portugal. In 1946 it published Alcinda Reis Pereira Gomes's PhD thesis—the first modern doctoral dissertation completed at a Portuguese university—and in 1950 it printed José Sebastião e Silva's pioneering work on analytic and functional analysis, which introduced what are now known as "Silva LN*‑spaces".

On its fiftieth anniversary in 1987, the Portuguese Mathematical Society embraced the transition to electronic typesetting by composing volume 44 entirely in TeX—a milestone that both celebrated the journal's longevity and reflected a broader shift in mathematical typography in Portugal.
