= Maximilian Janisch =

Swiss mathematician (born 2003)

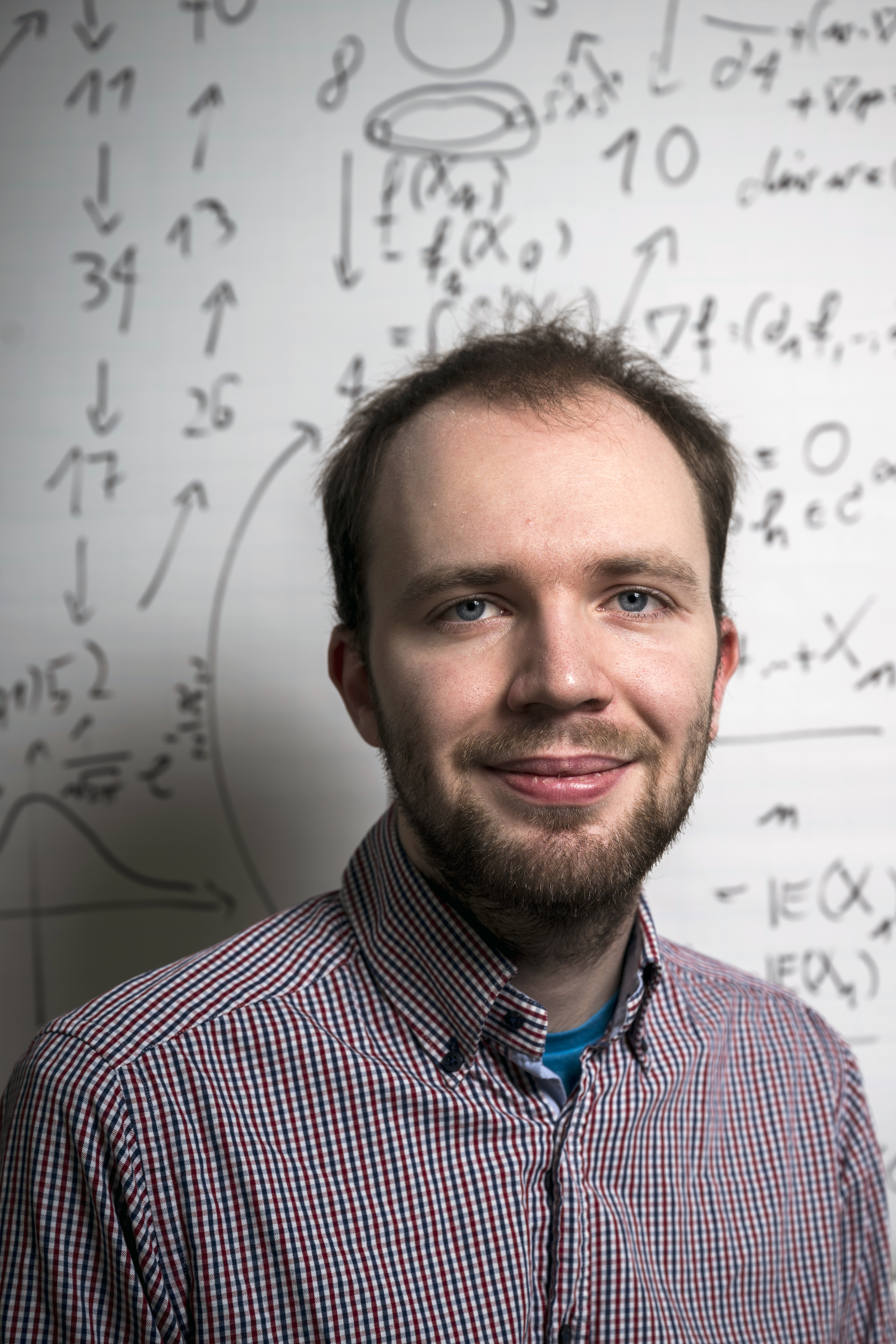
- Janisch in Zurich, 2025
- Born: August 8, 2003 (age 23); Zurich, Switzerland
- Citizenship: Swiss
- Education: University of Perpignan, University of Zurich
- Known for: Youngest doctoral student in Switzerland

Maximilian Sebastian Janisch (born August 8, 2003) is a Swiss PhD in mathematics. He defended his dissertation at the age of 21.

Janisch showed aptitude for mathematics at a very young age and was described as a Wunderkind, or child prodigy. After passing his high school mathematics exams at the age of nine, at the age of twelve, Janisch became the youngest university student in France, and at the age of eighteen, the youngest doctoral student in Switzerland.

== Biography ==
Janisch is the son of the German professor emeritus of mathematics Thomas Drisch and Monika Janisch, who was awarded a doctorate degree in Business Administration from the University of St. Gallen. Janisch skipped three years of elementary school after achieving an IQ score of 149+ in the WISC test. Janisch was admitted to the high school Gymnasium Immensee at the age of eight, and at the age of nine he passed the Matura in mathematics with top marks. After completing his Matura in mathematics, Janisch asked to attend the courses and exams of the mathematics study program at the ETH Zürich and was denied, receiving significant coverage in Swiss media.

Janisch was accepted by the French University of Perpignan in September 2015 as the youngest university student in France in the second year of studies, as it is required to have passed the complete Matura to start university in Switzerland, receiving international media coverage. When Janisch passed the full Swiss Matura in August 2018, he enrolled as a mathematics student at the University of Zurich. Janisch has been a doctoral student at the University of Zurich since December 2021. His doctoral advisor was Ashkan Nikeghbali. In June 2025, he defended successfully his dissertation to be granted a doctorate degree in mathematics.

There are several documentaries about Janisch, including the cinema documentary Maximilian (director: Nicolas Greinacher), which won a Grand Prix at the Rhode Island International Film Festival in 2018.

During 2025 before finishing the requirements for a PhD degree, there was additional media coverage about his achievements and personal lifestyle under the headline highly-gifted mathematician.
