= Jane McAdam =

Australian legal scholar

Jane McAdam AO FASSA
- Born: Jane Alexandra McAdam; 1974 (age 51–52); Australia
- Occupation: Legal scholar
- Employer: University of NSW

Jane Alexandra McAdam AO FASSA (born 1974) is an Australian legal scholar, and expert in climate change and refugees. She is a Scientia Professor at the University of NSW, and is the inaugural Director of the Kaldor Centre for International Refugee Law. She was awarded an Order of Australia in 2021 for “distinguished service to international refugee law, particularly to climate change”.

== Career ==
McAdam is the centre director of the Kaldor Centre for International Refugee Law (UNSW) and a Scientia Professor of Law. She holds or has held positions external to her current role, as a Senior Fellow at both The Brookings Institution, in the United States, and at the University of Oxford, as well as the Fridtjof Nansen Institute in Norway, and Refugee Law Initiative, London.

She works on issues surrounding the human rights and legal issues around asylum seekers and refugees from climate change and climate disasters, including flooding, rising sea levels, rising temperatures and bushfires, as well as international travel around Covid restrictions.

Specifically, McAdam's research focusses on the policy and legal responses that occur due to the impacts of climate change, and in particular, relocation that may be required due to climate change. McAdam has commented on the consequences of a warming planet, and the impact on people forced to move on account of disasters and climate change, raising the question 'where will they go'? Over the course of her career she has won a number of international prizes for her work on human rights, including for research on climate change and forced migration. She is Editor-in-Chief of the International Journal of Refugee Law.

== Media ==
McAdam has contributed to the media on issues such as refugees, and the suite of climate change issues that negatively impact people, including fires, floods, and rising water levels. For example she wrote about the Australian's displaced due to bushfires, where the 2019-2020 Black Summer January fires saw 65,000 displaced from their homes, These bushfires lead to 35 deaths, burned 18.6 million ha, and destroyed over 5,900 buildings and 2,799 homes.

McAdam also has provided commentary around the policy of restrictions on people returning home to Australia in 2020-2021 following Covid-19 and the legal issues surrounding government restrictions. McAdam has also written about the cost, legal and ethical issues of keeping refugees on Nauru and Manus Island. She wrote for the Sydney Morning Herald around a decision, by the UN Human Rights Committee who decided that climate refugees cannot be forced to return to their homes.

McAdam has contributed to The Conversation extensively, writing and providing commentary around refugee children, Manus island, and the policies around asylum seekers. She has also conduced fact checking for The Conversation around publicly made claims surrounding climate refugee numbers and estimates.

== Select publications ==
As of December 2021, McAdam has an H number of over 30, and over 6,000 citations from her work, according to Google Scholar.

- The refugee in international law, Guy S Goodwin-Gill, Jane McAdam (2021)
- Refugee rights and policy wrongs: A frank up-to-date guide by experts, Jane McAdam & Fiona Chong (2019)
- Climate change, forced migration, and international law, Jane McAdam (2012)
- Swimming against the Tide: Why a Climate Change Displacement Treaty is Not the Answer, J McAdam (2011) International Journal of Refugee Law 23 (1), 2-27

== Prizes and awards ==
- 2026 – Winner, Gerda Henkel Prize
- 2023 – Australian Laureate Fellow
- 2021 – Officer of the Order of Australia
- 2017 – Winner, International Calouste Gulbenkian Prize for human rights
- 2017 – Finalist, NSW Premier’s Award for Woman of the Year
- 2016 – Fellow of the Academy of Social Sciences
- 2015 – Global category of Westpac 100 Women of Influence
- 2015 – Australia’s top 10 Women of Influence
- 2013 – Young Global Leader of the World Economic Forum
