= Jacques Neveu =

Belgian-French mathematician (1932–2016)

Jacque Neveu
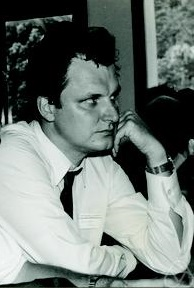
- Neveu in 1970
- Born: 14 November 1932
- Died: 17 May 2016 (aged 83)
- Education: University of Paris
- Awards: ICM Plenary Speaker (1974); Prix Francoeur (1967); Peccot Prize (1961-1962)
- Scientific career
- Fields: Mathematics
- Workplaces: University of Paris VI; École Polytechnique
- Doctoral advisor: Robert Fortet
- Doctoral students: Jean-Michel Bismut; Marie Duflo; Ivar Ekeland; Nicole El Karoui; Jean Jacod; François Ledrappier; Daniel Revuz; Alain-Sol Sznitman

Jacques Jean-Pierre Neveu (14 November 1932 – 17 May 2016) was a Belgian (and then French) mathematician, specializing in probability theory. He is one of the founders of the French school (post WW II) of probability and statistics.

== Education and career ==
Jacques Neveu received in 1955 from the Sorbonne his doctorate in mathematics under Robert Fortet with dissertation Étude des semi-groupes de Markov.

In 1960, Neveu was, with Robert Fortet, one of the first two members of the Laboratoire de Probabilités et Modèles Aléatoires (LPMA). He was the LPMA's director from 1980 until 1989 when Jean Jacod became the director.

In 1962, Neveu was a chargé de cours (university lecturer) at the Collège de France. He taught at the Sorbonne and, after the reorganization of the University of Paris, at the University of Paris VI at the Laboratory for Probability of the Institut de mathématiques de Jussieu. He was a professor at the École Polytechnique. In 1976, he gave a course at l'école d'été de Saint-Flour (a summer school in probability theory sponsored by the University of Clermont Auvergne). He was a visiting professor in Brussels, São Paulo, and Leuven.

From 1969 to 1987, Neveu was the thesis advisor for 19 doctoral students. In 1977, he was the president of the Société mathématique de France. In 1991, he founded the group Modélisation Aléatoire et Statistique (MAS) of the Société de Mathématiques Appliquées et Industrielles (SMAI). In 2012, he was elected a Fellow of the American Mathematical Society.

== Research ==
Neveu is one of the founders of the modern theory of probability. His research deals with Markov processes, Markov chains, Gaussian processes, martingales, ergodic theory, random trees (especially Galton-Watson processes and Galton-Watson trees), and Dirac measures, as well as applications of probability theory to statistics, computer science, combinatorics, and statistical physics. In 1986 he introduced the concept of arbre de Galton-Watson (Galton-Watson tree) within the framework of discrete random trees; within the mathematical formalism of Galton-Watson trees, the notation de Neveu is named in his honor.

== Commemoration ==
Several mathematicians have paid tribute to Neveu for his influence on the modern theory of probability.

He was outstanding in teaching as well as research. In honor of Neveu, a prize is awarded by the MAS group of the SMAI to the year's best of the new French holders of doctorates in mathematicians or statistics on the basis of the judged quality of the dissertation.

=== Prix Jacques Neveu ===
The laureates are:

- 2008: Pierre Nolin;
- 2009: Amandine Véber;
- 2010: Sébastien Bubeck & Kilian Raschel;
- 2011: Nicolas Curien;
- 2012: Pierre Jacob et Quentin Berger;
- 2013: Adrien Kassel;
- 2014: Emilie Kaufmann & Julien Reygner;
- 2015: Erwin Scornet;
- 2016: Anna Ben-Hamou;
- 2017: Aran Raoufi;
- 2018: Elsa Cazelles.

== Selected publications ==
=== Articles ===
- "Lattice methods and submarkovian processes." In Fourth Berkeley Symposium on Mathematical Statistics and Probability, pp. 347–391. 1961.
- "Existence of bounded invariant measures in ergodic theory." In Proc. Fifth Berkeley Sympos. Math. Statist. and Probability (Berkeley, Calif., 1965/66), vol. 2, no. Part 2, pp. 461–472. 1967.
- "Temps d'arrêt d'un système dynamique." Zeitschrift für Wahrscheinlichkeitstheorie und Verwandte Gebiete, vol. 13, no. 2, 1969, pp. 81–94. doi:10.1007/BF00537013
- "Potentiel Markovien récurrent des chaînes de Harris." Ann. Inst. Fourier, vol. 22, no. 2, 1972, pp. 85–130.
- "Sur l’espérance conditionelle par rapport à un mouvement brownien." Ann. Inst. H. Poincaré, section B, vol. 12, no. 2, 1976, pp. 105–109.
- "Processus ponctuels." In École d’Eté de Probabilités de Saint-Flour VI-1976, pp. 249–445. Springer, Berlin, Heidelberg, 1977. doi:10.1007/BFb0097494
- Arbres et processus de Galton-Watson, Annales de l'IHP, section B, vol. 22, 1986, pp. 199–207.
- "Multiplicative martingales for spatial branching processes." In Seminar on Stochastic Processes, 1987, pp. 223–242. Birkhäuser Boston, 1988. doi:10.1007/978-1-4684-0550-7_10
- with Francis Comets: The Sherrington-Kirkpatrick model of spin glasses and stochastic calculus: the high temperature case. Communications in Mathematical Physics, vol. 166, no. 3, 1995, pp. 549–564. doi:10.1007/BF02099887

=== Books ===
- Théorie des semi-groups de Markov, University of California Press 1958 (and Gauthier-Villars 1958)
- Bases mathématiques du calcul des probabilités, Masson, 1964, 1970
  - English translation: Mathematical foundations of the calculus of probability, Holden-Day 1965
- Processus aléatoires gaulliens, Montréal: Presses de l'Université de Montréal, 1968
- Cours de probabilités, École Polytechnique, 1970, 1978
- Martingales à temps discret, Masson, 1972
  - English translation: Discrete-parameter martingales, Elsevier, 1975
- Théorie de la mesure et intégration, cours de l'École polytechnique, 1983
- Introduction aux processus aléatoires, École Polytechnique 1985
