= Antonio Monteiro (mathematician) =

Angolan-born Brazilian mathematician

António Aniceto Monteiro
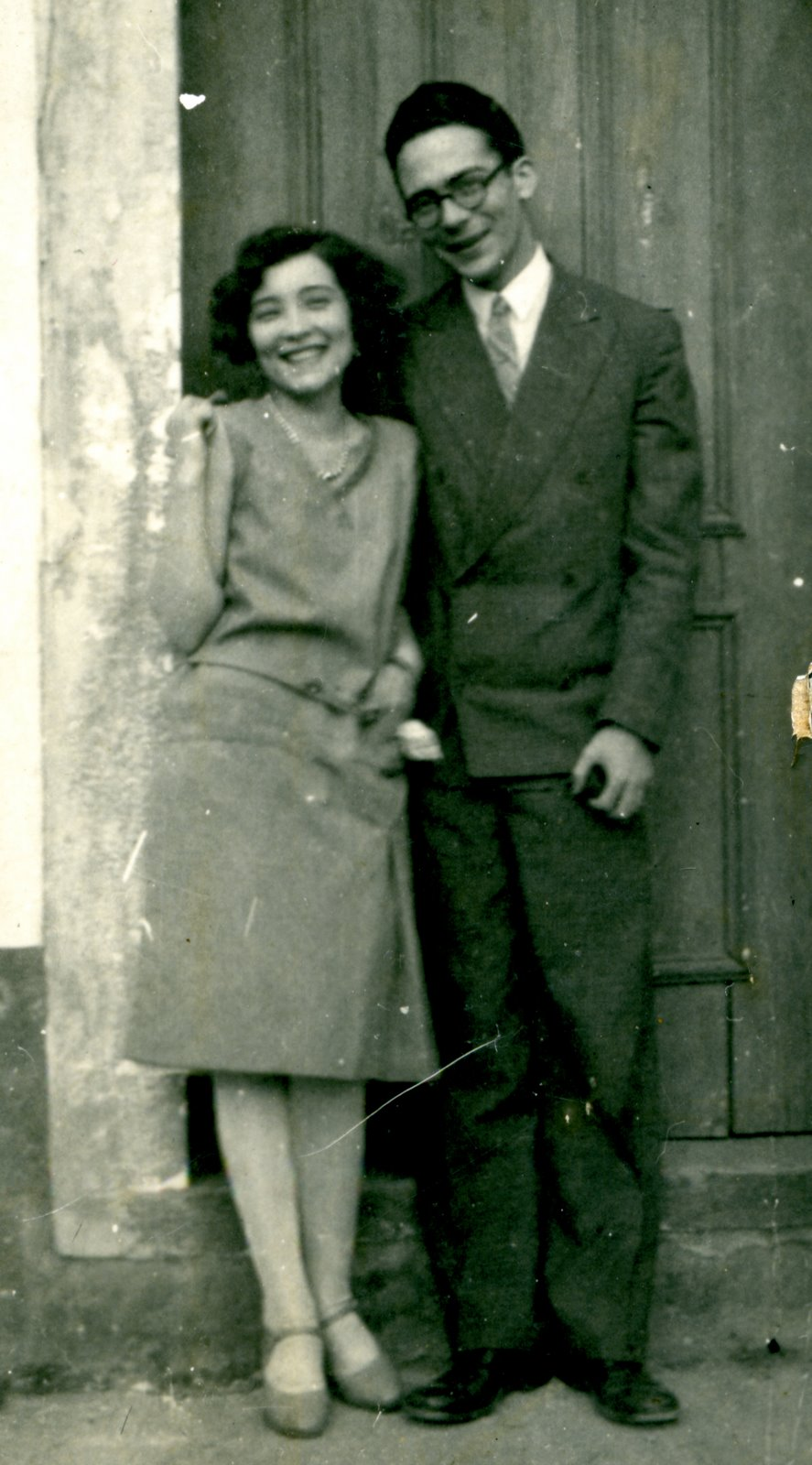
- Portrait of newlyweds Antonio Aniceto Monteiro and Lydia Marina de Faria Torres
- Born: 1907; Portuguese Angola
- Died: 29 October 1980 (aged 72–73); Bahía Blanca, Argentina
- Citizenship: Portuguese
- Education: University of Lisbon; Institut Henri Poincaré
- Known for: Contributions to mathematical logic Founding Portugaliae Mathematica; Establishing the Portuguese Mathematical Society
- Awards: Gulbenkian Science and Technology Prize (1978); Military Order of Saint James of the Sword (2000, posthumous)
- Scientific career
- Fields: Mathematics
- Workplaces: University of Lisbon; National Faculty of Philosophy, Rio de Janeiro; National University of Cuyo; Universidad Nacional del Sur
- Doctoral advisor: Maurice Fréchet
- Notable students: Hugo Ribeiro; José Sebastião e Silva

António Aniceto Monteiro (31 May 1907–29 October 1980) was a mathematician born in Portuguese Angola who later emigrated to Brazil in 1945 and finally to Argentina in 1950. Monteiro is best known for establishing a school of algebraic logic at Universidad Nacional del Sur, Bahía Blanca, Argentina. His efforts to promote theoretical computer science research in Argentina were less successful.

After his undergraduate studies at the University of Lisbon (completed in 1930), Monteiro obtained a PhD at Sorbonne in 1936 under the advisement of Maurice Fréchet with a thesis in topology. In Portugal Monteiro was the main founder of the journal Portugaliae Mathematica in 1937.

In 1945 Monteiro moved to Brazil. There are two versions of why Monteiro left Portugal. The first version is that Monteiro and other Portuguese mathematicians like Ruy Luís Gomes fell foul of Salazar's regime for their political beliefs; some, like Gomes, were imprisoned; others, like Monteiro, were simply denied employment and practically forced to emigrate. The second version, supported by Monteiro's written documents, is that he was tired of the problems created by his fellow scholars that were blocking his attempts to modernize mathematics in Portuguese universities.

Leopoldo Nachbin was one of Monteiro's Brazilian students. Monteiro's impact on Argentinean mathematics has been compared to that of Julio Rey Pastor.

== Biography ==
Born in 1907 in Angola, Monteiro moved to Lisbon after his father's premature death in 1915. From 1917 to 1925, he attended the Military College (Colégio Militar). In 1925, he enrolled in the mathematics course at the Faculty of Sciences of the University of Lisbon, which he completed in 1930. In 1929, he married Lídia Monteiro. He studied with René Maurice Fréchet in France, at the Institut Henri Poincaré in Paris from 1931 to 1936, where he went with the specific purpose of studying mathematics. During his time in Paris, he had the opportunity to experience true mathematical research and observe how such research could be organized. When he returned to Portugal in 1936, he remained without an official position at any faculty until 1945. During this period, he worked extensively on scientific publications. Due to his unwavering moral integrity, he refused to sign a statement required of all public officials that declared loyalty to the social order established by the 1933 Political Constitution and rejected communism and all subversive ideas. Despite opposition from the Estado Novo regime, he was able to create the Portugaliae Mathematica journal and the Portuguese Mathematical Society. He also helped establish the Gazeta de Matemática (Mathematics Gazette) and the Analysis Seminar, which attracted many young mathematicians to modern mathematics. While in Portugal, he mentored two important figures in Portuguese mathematics: Hugo Ribeiro and José Sebastião e Silva. However, the regime did not tolerate free spirits and modernizing movements, making his work extremely difficult.

== Career in Brazil and Argentina ==
In 1945, he moved to Brazil to avoid the Portuguese nationalist dictatorship led by António de Oliveira Salazar. He had accepted an invitation to teach at the National Faculty of Philosophy in Rio de Janeiro, having been recommended by Albert Einstein, John von Neumann, and Guido Beck (though these recommendations were not decisive). In Brazil he founded the Mathematics Department of the Faculty of Philosophy at the University of Brazil. Between 1945 and 1949, in addition to mentoring several disciples, he had the opportunity to create a series of publications called Notas de Matemática and helped establish the Brazilian Center for Physics Research (Centro Brasileiro de Pesquisas Físicas). He was also appointed a member of the Editorial Committee of the Summa Brasiliensis Mathematicae published by the Getúlio Vargas Foundation.

In 1949, Monteiro moved to Argentina, having secured a contract with the National University of Cuyo in San Juan, where he was equally productive. In 1957, he faced what would become the challenge of his life: organizing the Institute of Mathematics and the Mathematics Degree program at the Universidad Nacional del Sur in Bahía Blanca. Bahía Blanca was a remote location with virtually no existing scientific activity. Monteiro decided to establish a scientific project there rather than following the advice of mathematician Marshall Harvey Stone to go to the United States, like his disciple Hugo Ribeiro had done. This decision allowed him to put into practice his convictions about how to conduct and teach science.

He transformed Bahía Blanca into one of the most important mathematical centres in Latin America, particularly for algebraic logic. In 1972, he was designated Professor Emeritus of the Universidad Nacional del Sur. In 1975, the political situation in Argentina changed, and his contract with the Universidad Nacional del Sur was abruptly terminated under the "Organic Law of National Universities", which prohibited political proselytism or ideas contrary to the democratic system. He was even forbidden from entering the Mathematics Institute's library—a library he had created and which now bears his name.

== Later years and legacy ==
In 1977, he returned to Portugal, where the National Institute for Scientific Research created a position for him as a researcher. He remained in Portugal for about two years, receiving the Gulbenkian Science and Technology Prize in 1978. Monteiro returned to Bahía Blanca where he died on 29 October 1980. In 2000, he was posthumously awarded the Military Order of Saint James of the Sword (Grã-Cruz da ordem Militar de Santiago da Espada) by the President of the Republic Jorge Sampaio.

== Monographs ==
- Monteiro, António "Sur les algèbres de Heyting symétriques." Portugaliae mathematica 39.1–4 (1980): 1–237.
