= François Ledrappier =

French mathematician (born 1946)

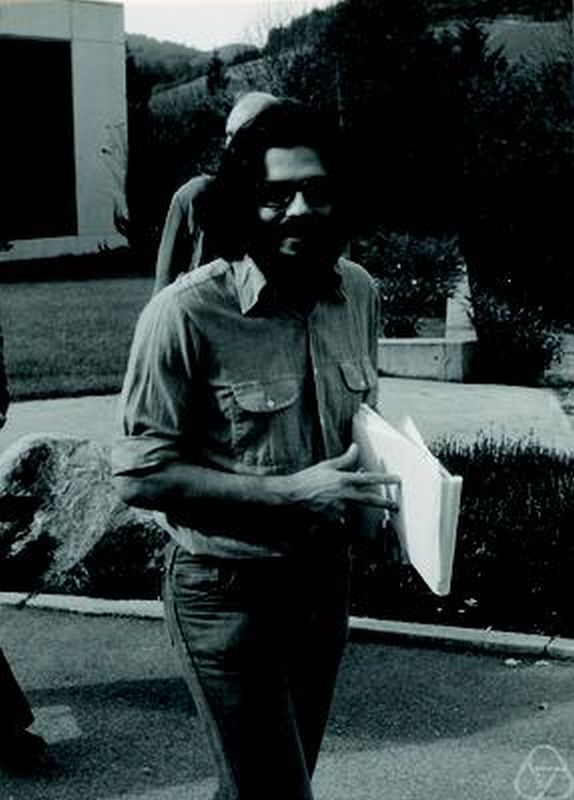
François Ledrappier, Oberwolfach 1976

François Ledrappier (born 17 January 1946) is a French mathematician.

Ledrappier graduated from the École Polytechnique in 1967 and received his doctorate from Pierre and Marie Curie University (Paris 6) in 1975 under the supervision of Jacques Neveu. Ledrappier taught at Paris 6 and then became a professor at South Bend's University of Notre Dame, where he is now professor emeritus.

His research deals with asymptotic properties of group actions and related problems. He has published articles on dynamical systems theory, compact negatively curved manifolds and their abelian covers, linear actions and random walks on linear groups, geometric measure theory, and zero entropy algebraic actions of free abelian groups.

In 1994 Ledrappier was an invited speaker at the International Congress of Mathematicians in Zurich. In 2016 he received the Sophie Germain Prize.

His doctoral students include Nalini Anantharaman.

== Selected publications ==
- Ledrappier, François; Walters, Peter (1977). "A relativised variational principle for continuous transformations". Journal of the London Mathematical Society. 2 (3): 568–576. doi:10.1112/jlms/s2-16.3.568.
- Ledrappier, François (1981). "Some properties of absolutely continuous invariant measures on an interval". Ergodic Theory and Dynamical Systems. 1: 77–93. doi:10.1017/S0143385700001176.
- Ledrappier, F. (1981). "Some relations between dimension and Lyapounov exponents". Communications in Mathematical Physics. 81 (2): 229–238. Bibcode:1981CMaPh..81..229L. doi:10.1007/BF01208896. S2CID 122105442.
- Ledrappier, François; Strelcyn, Jean-Marie (1982). "A proof of the estimation from below in Pesin entropy formula". Ergodic Theory and Dynamical Systems. 2 (2): 203–219. doi:10.1017/S0143385700001528. S2CID 121546161.
- Ledrappier, F.; Young, L.-S. (1985). "The Metric Entropy of Diffeomorphisms: Part I: Characterization of Measures Satisfying Pesin's Entropy Formula". The Annals of Mathematics. 122 (3): 509. doi:10.2307/1971328. JSTOR 1971328.
- Ledrappier, F.; Young, L.-S. (1985). "The Metric Entropy of Diffeomorphisms: Part II: Relations between Entropy, Exponents and Dimension". The Annals of Mathematics. 122 (3): 540. doi:10.2307/1971329. JSTOR 1971329.
- Ledrappier, F. (1986). "Positivity of the exponent for stationary sequences of matrices". Lyapunov Exponents. Lecture Notes in Mathematics. Vol. 1186. pp. 56–73. doi:10.1007/BFb0076833. ISBN 978-3-540-16458-6.
- Ledrappier, F.; Young, L. -S. (1988). "Entropy formula for random transformations". Probability Theory and Related Fields. 80 (2): 217–240. doi:10.1007/BF00356103. S2CID 15472103.
- Ledrappier, F.; Young, L. -S. (1988). "Dimension formula for random transformations". Communications in Mathematical Physics. 117 (4): 529–548. Bibcode:1988CMaPh.117..529L. doi:10.1007/BF01218383. ISSN 0010-3616. S2CID 119776081.
- Ledrappier, F. (1990). "Harmonic measures and Bowen-Margulis measures". Israel Journal of Mathematics. 71 (3): 275–287. doi:10.1007/BF02773746.
- Babillot, Martine; Ledrappier, François (1998). "Lalley's theorem on periodic orbits of hyperbolic flows". Ergodic Theory and Dynamical Systems. 18 (1): 17–39. doi:10.1017/S0143385798100330. ISSN 0143-3857.
- Ledrappier, François (2001). "Some asymptotic properties of random walks on free groups". In Taylor, J.C. (ed.). Topics in probability and Lie groups: boundary theory. CRM Proceedings and Lecture Notes. Vol. 28. American Mathematical Society. pp. 117–152. ISBN 9780821870242.
- Ledrappier, François; Lindenstrauss, Elon (2003). "On the projections of measures invariant under the geodesic flow". International Mathematics Research Notices. 2003 (9): 511. doi:10.1155/S1073792803208114. ISSN 1073-7928.
- Karlsson, Anders; Ledrappier, François (2006). "On laws of large numbers for random walks". The Annals of Probability. 34 (5): 1693–1706. arXiv:math/0611607. doi:10.1214/009117906000000296. ISSN 0091-1798.
- Karlsson, Anders; Ledrappier, F. (2011). "Noncommutative ergodic theorems". arXiv:1110.6847 [math.DS].
