= Gulbenkian Prize =

Gulbenkian Prize is a series of prizes awarded annually by the Calouste Gulbenkian Foundation. The main Gulbenkian Prize was established in 1976 as the Gulbenkian Science Prize awarded to Portuguese individuals and organizations.

Starting 2012, the Foundation started giving a special international Prize funded by an annual award of €100,000 each in the field of human rights called the Calouste Gulbenkian Prize on Human Rights.

The Gulbenkian Science Prize has now been restructured and is known as the Gulbenkian Prizes on Cohesion, Knowledge and Sustainability and three prizes are awarded in each of the fields

== Gulbenkian Science Prize ==
The Gulbenkian Science Prize (in Portuguese: Prémio Calouste Gulbenkian de Ciência e Tecnologia) established in 1976 is an annual award to Portuguese nationals or those whose work has been carried out in Portugal. From 2007 to 2011 it was given in four categories, awarded annually every four years: Basic Sciences (Mathematics and Computing Sciences); Physical Sciences; Life Sciences; and Social and Human Sciences. The prize was worth 50,000 Euros (previously €25,000).

In 2011 a new prize (€100,000 for the first prize, €50,000 for the other four) was awarded for five disciplines: Intercultural and Environmental Dialogue; Arts; Science; Charity; and Education.

In 2017 three new categories were announced: Knowledge, Sustainability, and Cohesion, with prizes of €50,000 each.

Past recipients include:

- 1986: Maria João Rodrigues
- 1987: António Freitas, Benedita Rocha, António Coutinho
- 1996: Boaventura de Sousa Santos
- 1997: David Ish-Horowicz
- 1998: Ana Rute Neves
- 1999: Cristina Maria André de Pina e Sousa and Saůl António Gomes
- 2000:
- 2001: Gustavo Castelo Branco, Luís Manuel Lavoura and João Paulo F. da Silva: and Rui Loja Fernandes
- 2002: Patrício Silva and Pedro Gomes
- 2003: José Machado Pais
- 2004: Lorenzo Cornalba and Miguel Sousa da Costa; Sergey Dorogovtsev and José Fernando Ferreira Mendes; and José Francisco Rodrigues.
- 2005:
- 2006:
- 2007:
  - Arts category - Hand in Hand: Center for Jewish-Arab Education in Israel (€100,000); Ângelo de Sousa, Maria do Carmo Fonseca
  - Science category - Luís Barreira (€50,000)
  - Charity category - Associação das Aldeias de Crianças SOS Portugal (€50,000)
  - Education category - Ar.Co (Centro de Arte e Comunicação Visual) (€50,000 each)
- 2008: Sérgio Rebelo
- 2009: Maria João Saraiva
- 2010: Miguel Poiares Maduro
- 2011: Nuno Peres
- 2012-2018: See Human Rights section

=== Gulbenkian Prizes on Cohesion, Knowledge and Sustainability ===
Three annual awards are given to individuals and non-profit private legal entities which have distinguished themselves in Portugal in the defence and promotion of Cohesion, Knowledge and Sustainability. Three annual awards are given one in each field of the categories of the prize

- 2017:
  - Cohesion category - Artistic Musical Society of Pousos
  - Knowledge category - Portuguese Mathematics Society
  - Sustainability category - Association of Douro Valley Viticulture Development (ADVID)
- 2018:
  - Cohesion category - É uma Casa, Lisboa Housing First
  - Knowledge category - O Espaço do Tempo
  - Sustainability category - Coopérnico Cooperative

== Calouste Gulbenkian Prize on Human Rights ==
An international annual prize awarded to individuals and non-profit private legal entities which have distinguished themselves internationally in the defence and promotion of Human Rights on the issue of freedom of expression, information and press. Winners were:

- 2012: West–Eastern Divan Orchestra
- 2013: Bibliotheca Alexandrina - awarded to director Ismail Serageldin
- 2014: Community of Sant'Egidio
- 2015: Dr. Denis Mukwege (Congo)
- 2016: Amazonas Sustainable Foundation, in Portuguese The Amazonas Sustentável Foundation
- 2017: Hungarian Helsinki Committee / Professor Jane McAdam (Australia) - in ex-aequo
- 2018: Article 19
- 2019: Amin Maalouf

== Gulbenkian Museum Prize ==
Known as the Gulbenkian Prize for the period 2003 to 2007, it was an annual prize awarded to a United Kingdom museum or gallery for a "track record of imagination, innovation and excellence". The Calouste Gulbenkian Foundation ended its sponsorship in 2007 and the award became the Art Fund Prize, and later Museum of the Year.

== Other awards by the Calouste Gulbenkian Foundation ==
=== Vasco Vilalva Prize ===
Established in 2009, this is an annual prize of 50,000 euros, awarded to exemplary Portuguese projects displaying interventions in movable and immovable property of cultural value that stimulate the preservation and recovery of the heritage. The award is named after Vasco Vilalva (1913–1975), a Portuguese philanthropist and patron.

=== Award for Civic Arts Organisations ===
Established in 2020, the award recognises publicly funded arts organisations in the UK using the transformational power of art for individual and societal change. Offering a total of £150,000 prize funding, it is one of the largest awards in the UK

=== Branquinho da Fonseca Prize ===
The award is a literary prize that aims to encourage the emergence of young writers between the ages of 15 and 30.

=== Gulbenkian Prize for Humanity ===
Established in 2020, the first €1-million Prize for Humanity was awarded in July 2020. It is aimed at distinguishing people or institutions fighting climate change.

Winners of Gulbenkian Prize for Humanity were:

- 2020: Greta Thunberg
- 2021: Global Covenant of Mayors for Climate & Energy
- 2022: IPBES and IPCC
- 2023: Cécile Bibiane Ndjebet, Lélia Salgado and Bandi “Apai Janggut”
- 2024: Andhra Pradesh Community Managed Natural Farming (India), Rattan Lal (USA/India) and SEKEM (Egypt)
