= Jyotiprasad Medhi =

Indian statistician (1924–2017)

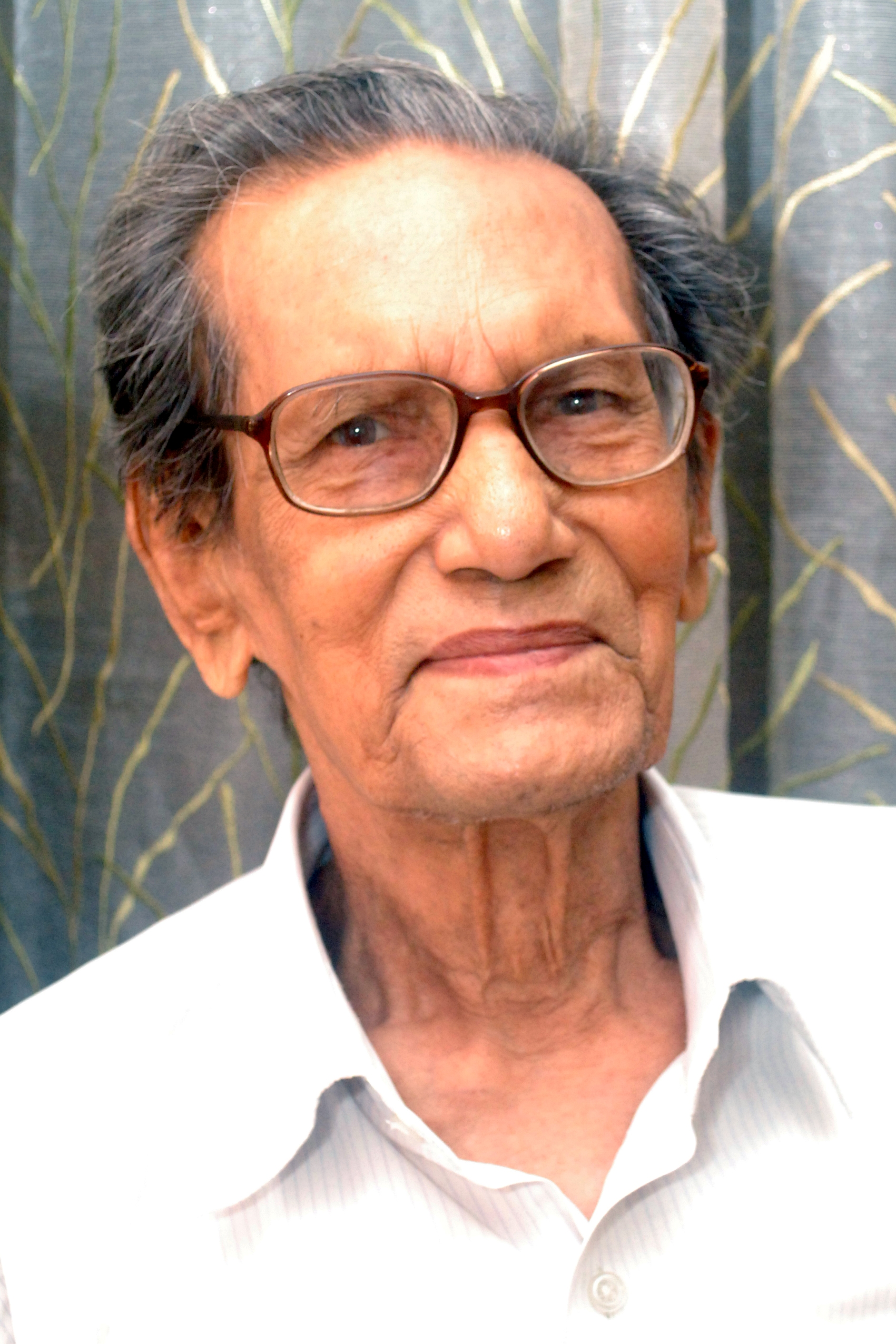
- Born: 1 July 1924; Kamrup, Assam, India
- Died: February 2017 (aged 92); Guwahati, India
- Other name: Bhagawati Da
- Education: University of Paris; University of Manchester; Calcutta University; Cotton University
- Known for: Queueing theory, Stochastic process, Statistics
- Spouse: Prity Medhi
- Children: 4
- Scientific career
- Fields: Statistics
- Workplaces: Gauhati University, Institute of Advanced Study in Science and Technology
- Thesis: Problems d'estination statisque relatifs a certains processus stationnares de second ordre (1956)
- Doctoral advisor: Robert Fortet
- Other academic advisors: M S Bartlett
- Doctoral students: Tata Subba Rao

Jyotiprasad Medhi was a professor of statistics at Gauhati University and Institute of Advanced Study in Science and Technology.

== Work and education ==
Medhi started his schooling in Dibrugarh and in 1940 he passed matriculation from Dibrugarh Government High School. After matriculation, he did his graduate studies in Cotton College, Guwahati in 1946 and was a gold medalist in BSc with Honours in mathematics. There he received the Sudmerson Gold Medal and Rajanikant Barat Gold Medal. Medhi did his MSc in Pure Mathematics from Calcutta University, and got the Debendra Nath Gangopadhaya Gold medal for record marks obtained and the Post graduate First class first gold medal in 1948. In 1952, he took a loan of ten thousand rupees from Govt of Assam and moved to England to pursue Master of Statistics (MStat) from the University of Manchester and completed in 1954. He worked with M S Bartlett in the University of Manchester in 1955 on the topic 'Time Series Analysis'. Thereon Medhi moved to France to complete his DSc at the University of Paris in 1956 under the supervision of Robert Fortet, while Georges Darmois and Daniel Dugué served on his thesis examination committee. He had also taken a diploma in French Language with mention 'Honorable'. Its worthy to mention that he had written his doctoral thesis in French Language.

Medhi joined as a lecturer of statistics at Cotton University erstwhile Cotton College, Guwahati in 1948. However, in the same year Gauhati University was established and he was invited to work as professor in Gauhati University. Accepting the invitation, he joined the Department of Mathematics and Statistics as a lecturer. In between his tenure, he had taken MS degree from England and DSc from Paris. Medhi returned to Gauhati University where he became a professor and was the head of the department of statistics till he retired in 1985. Earlier in Gauhati University, both mathematics and statistics were in a common department, however, under the able leadership of Prof Medhi, statistics became a full-fledged individual department. In 1987, two years after retirement, he was entitled the honour of professor emeritus at the same university and remained so until his death in 2017. Under his guidance, several students got doctoral degrees and Tata Subba Rao is the first among them. From Southern India, Subba Rao had come to Assam to pursue his research under Prof Medhi and later he had joined Manchester University as a Professor. In 1979, he established the 'Population Research Centre' and served as a director. He played a prominent role in shaping the newly formed Institute of Advanced Study in Science and Technology, Assam, IASST by serving as director.

== Publications ==
Medhi published many articles in peer reviewed international and national journals. He also published two books on stochastic processes each with over 500 citations.

== Awards and honours ==
The J Medhi memorial lecture is annually held in the Indian Institute of Technology, Guwahati at the Department of Mathematics. In 2016, Medhi was conferred an Honorary doctorate DSc by Tezpur University.
