= Daniel Revuz =

French mathematician (born 1936)

- Born: 1936 (age 89–90); Paris, Ile-de-France, France
- Education: The Sorbonne
- Known for: Revuz correspondence Revuz measure
- Scientific career
- Fields: Probability theory
- Workplaces: Paris 7
- Thesis: Mesures associées aux fonctionnelles additives de Markov (1969)
- Doctoral advisor: Jacques Neveu

Daniel Revuz (born 1936) is a French mathematician specializing in probability theory, particularly in functional analysis applied to stochastic processes. He is the author of several reference works on Brownian motion, Markov chains, and martingales.

== Family and early life ==
Revuz is the son of mathematicians Germaine and André Revuz, and is one of six children. His family spent parts of his childhood in Poitiers and Istanbul before settling in Paris in 1950.

== Education and career ==
Revuz graduated from Polytechnique in 1956 and received his doctorate from the Sorbonne in 1969 under Jacques Neveu and Paul-André Meyer. He taught at Paris Diderot University at the Laboratory for Probability Theory of the Institut Mathématique de Jussieu.

=== Research ===
From his doctoral thesis work Revuz published two articles in 1970, in which he established a theory of one-to-one correspondence between positive Markov additive functionals and associated measures. This theory and the associated measures are now known respectively as "Revuz correspondence" and "Revuz measures."

In 1991, Revuz co-authored a research monograph with Marc Yor on stochastic processes and stochastic analysis called "Continuous Martingales and Brownian Motion". The book was highly praised upon its publication. Wilfrid Kendall called it "the book for a capable graduate student starting out on research in probability."
