= Marie Duflo =

French probability theorist (1940–2019)

Marie Duflo (19 August 1940 – 15 September 2019) was a French probability theorist, and left-wing internationalist activist, known for her books on probability theory and random processes and on Nicaraguan politics.

== Education and career ==
Duflo was an alumna of the École normale supérieure de jeunes filles, promoted in 1959, and completed a doctorate (Doctorat d'État) at the University of Paris in 1969, with the dissertation Opérateurs potentiels des chaînes et des processus de Markov irréductibles supervised by Jacques Neveu. She became a professor at Université Paris-Nord and the University of Marne-la-Vallée.

== Activism ==
Duflo was active in French left-wing circles concerning Latin America. In 1968, she attended a Cultural Congress in Havana with several other French mathematicians. In the 1980s, she took over the responsibility for Central American affairs in the French Socialist Party when Nicole Bourdillat stepped up to head Latin American affairs more generally for the party, and later under Louis Le Pensec she became the head of Latin American affairs for the party herself.

By 2006, when she signed an open letter in support of undocumented students in France, she had retired from Marne-la-Vallée as a professor emerita. She spent her retirement as an activist for the rights of foreigners in France, and a 2020 paper on the legal treatment of noncitizens in overseas France was dedicated in her memory.

== Books ==
Her books include:

- Décisions statistiques pas à pas [Statistical decisions step by step] (with Danielle Florens-Zmirou, CIMPA, 1981)
- Probabilités et statistiques (two volumes, with Didier Dacunha-Castelle, Masson, 1982; also published with two separate volumes of exercises; translated into English by David McHale as Probability and statistics, Springer, 1986)
- Le volcan nicaraguayen [The Nicaraguan Volcano] (edited with Françoise Ruellan, La découverte, 1985)
- Méthodes récursives aléatoires (Masson, 1990, revised and translated into English by Stephen S. Wilson as Random iterative models, Springer, 1997)
- Algorithmes stochastiques [Stochastic algorithms] (Springer, 1996)
