= Emilie Kaufmann =

French statistician and computer scientist

Emilie Kaufmann (born 1987) is a French statistician and computer scientist specializing in machine learning, and particularly known for her research on the multi-armed bandit problem. She is a researcher for the French National Centre for Scientific Research (CNRS), associated with the Centre de Recherche en Informatique, Signal et Automatique de Lille (CRIStAL) at the University of Lille.

== Education and career ==
Kaufmann studied mathematics at the University of Strasbourg, earning a bachelor's degree in 2009, and she passed the agrégation in mathematics in 2010. In 2011 she earned a master's degree in statistical learning from the École normale supérieure Paris-Saclay, and she completed her Ph.D. in 2014 at Télécom Paris. Her dissertation was Analyse de stratégies bayésiennes et fréquentistes pour l’allocation séquentielle de ressources, supervised by Olivier Cappé and Aurélien Garivier.

After postdoctoral research in the project on Dynamics of Geometric Networks (DYOGENE) with the French Institute for Research in Computer Science and Automation (Inria) in Paris, she joined CNRS and the Sequential Learning group (SequeL) of CRIStAL in 2015. The SequeL project was succeeded in 2020 by the related Inria Scool project, concerning sequential decision making problem under uncertainty, bandit learning, and reinforcement learning, and Kaufmann became part of the Scool team.

== Recognition ==
Kaufmann was one of two winners of the 2014 Jacques Neveu Prize of the Société de Mathématiques Appliquées et Industrielles, recognizing the best French dissertations in mathematics and statistics from that year.

In 2024, she was awarded the CNRS bronze medal, acknowledging her work as a specialist in her field.
