= Laura Monk =

French mathematician

Laura Monk is a French mathematician whose research in spectral geometry, on the expansion and spectral properties of random hyperbolic surfaces, continues the work of Maryam Mirzakhani. She works in England at the University of Bristol as a Royal Society Dorothy Hodgkin Research Fellow and proleptic (tenure-track) lecturer.

== Education and career ==
After preparatory studies at the Lycée privé Sainte-Geneviève, Monk received bachelor's degrees in both mathematics and physics at Paris-Sud University in 2015, passed her agrégation in mathematics in 2017, and received a master's degree with honors in 2018, also including study at the École Normale Supérieure. She completed her Ph.D. in 2021 at the University of Strasbourg, with the dissertation Geometry and spectrum of typical hyperbolic surfaces supervised by Nalini Anantharaman.

She was a postdoctoral fellow at the Max Planck Institute for Mathematics, working there with Ursula Hamenstädt, from 2021 to 2022. She joined the University of Bristol in 2022 as a research associate of Jens Marklof. She became a research fellow and proleptic lecturer in 2024.

== Recognition ==
As a doctoral student, Monk was named a French Young Talent in the 2021 L'Oréal-UNESCO For Women in Science Awards. She was a 2024 recipient of the Maryam Mirzakhani New Frontiers Prize, given to her "for advancing our understanding of random hyperbolic surfaces of large genus".

The Royal Society awarded Monk a Dorothy Hodgkin Fellowship in 2024.
