= Tata Subba Rao =

Tata Subba Rao (1942 – 13 April 2018) was a professor of statistics in the School of Mathematics, University of Manchester. He gained his MA at NIT Surathkal, his PhD from Gauhati University in 1966 under the guidance of Jyotiprasad Medhi, and DSc from Manchester in 1988. He was a specialist in time series analysis especially non-stationary and non-linear time series analysis, higher order spectral analysis, theory of random fields, time series methods for analysis of environmental variables (detection of climatic changes etc.) and multivariate nonlinear models. The Subba Rao–Liporace models, and Subba Rao Gabr window for bivariate spectra are named after him.

Subba Rao retired, but was given an emeritus chair, in 2009 having worked at UMIST and the University of Manchester for 42 years. He published over 70 papers and supervised 15 PhD students. Even after retirement he remained active.
