= Maligny, Yonne =

Maligny
- Commune
- Coat of arms
- Location of Maligny
- Location within France Location within Bourgogne-Franche-Comté
- Coordinates: 47°52′15″N 3°45′55″E
- Country: France
- Region: Bourgogne-Franche-Comté
- Department: Yonne
- Arrondissement: Auxerre
- Canton: Chablis

Government
  - Mayor (2020–2026): Damien Gauthier
- Area^{1}: 22.28 km^{2} (8.60 sq mi)
- Highest elevation: 262 m (860 ft)
- Lowest elevation: 115 m (377 ft)
- Population (2023): 776
  - Density: 34.8/km^{2} (90.2/sq mi)
- Time zone: UTC+01:00 (CET)
  - Summer (DST): UTC+02:00 (CEST)
- INSEE/Postal code: 89242 /89800
- ^{1} French Land Register data, which excludes lakes, ponds, glaciers > 1 km^{2} (0.386 sq mi or 247 acres) and river estuaries.

Maligny (French pronunciation: [maliɲi]) is a commune in the Yonne department in Bourgogne-Franche-Comté in north-central France. It is the birthplace of mathematician Maurice René Fréchet.

== See also ==
- Communes of the Yonne department
