= António Luís Gomes =

Portuguese jurist and politician

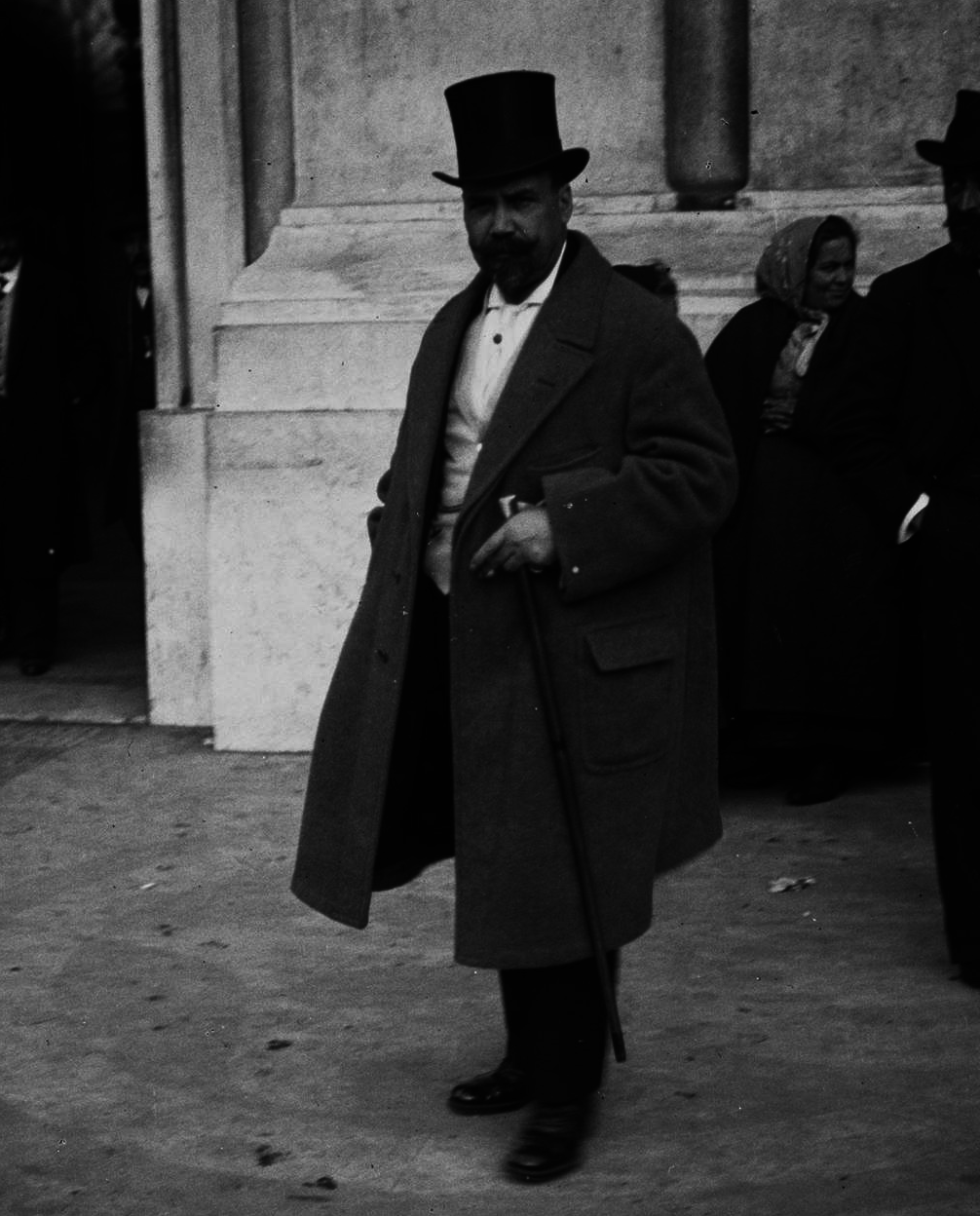
António Luís Gomes, 1911

António Luís Gomes (23 September 1863 – 28 August 1961) was a Portuguese jurist and politician. A member of the Portuguese Republican Party, he served as a government minister and ambassador to Brazil.

Gomes married Maria José Medeiros de Oliveira, and was father of the mathematician Ruy Luís Gomes.

As a student at the University of Coimbra, he was the main mover in the founding of the Associação Académica de Coimbra.
