= Robert Fortet =

French mathematician (1912–1998)

Robert Fortet (1 May 1912, Boulazac, France – 3 July 1998, Paris) was a French mathematician working on analysis. His doctoral advisor was Maurice René Fréchet.

Fortet was a professor at the University of Caen and at the University of Paris. Some of his Ph.D. students in Paris were Egon Balas, Jyotiprasad Medhi and Jacques Neveu.
