= Bento de Jesus Caraça =

Portuguese mathematician (1901–1948)

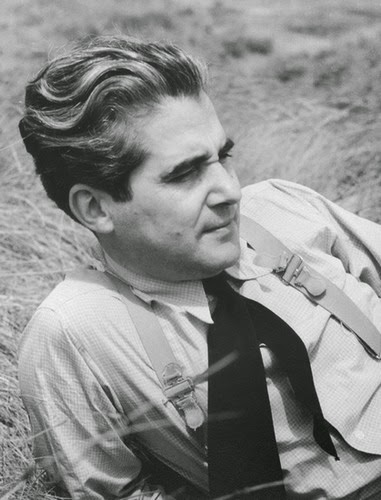
- Born: 18 April 1901; Vila Viçosa, Portugal
- Died: 25 June 1948 (aged 47); Lisbon, Portugal
- Occupations: Mathematician, economist, statistician

Bento de Jesus Caraça, GCSE, GOL (18 April 1901 – 25 June 1948) was an influential Portuguese mathematician, economist and statistician. Caraça was also a member of the Portuguese Communist Party, and participated in the formation of the Portuguese Movement of National Antifascist Unity and Movement of Democratic Unity in the 1940s. For his role in the resistance against the Estado Novo regime led by António Oliveira Salazar, Caraça was arrested and lost his professorship at the ISCEF.

== Biography ==
Caraça was born in Vila Viçosa, Évora District, in the south of Portugal. He was the son of two peasants, João António Caraça and Domingas da Conceição Espadinha. He lived his first years on the family's farm and he managed to learn how to read with another peasant, José Percheiro.

Caraça showed a great capacity for learning from a young age, which led the Albuquerque family, who owned the farm where his family lived, to support his education. After finishing primary school in 1911, Caraça studied at the Liceu Pedro Nunes in Lisbon, where he completed his secondary education in 1918. He enrolled at the Higher Institute of Commerce (Portuguese: Instituto Superior de Comércio, later known as the ISCEF and ISEG) the same year.

On November 1, 1919, as a 2nd-year student, Caraça was nominated 2nd assistant by his teacher Aureliano de Mira Fernandes. He graduated in 1923. On December 13, 1924, he was nominated 1st assistant and, on October 14, 1927, he was appointed as a professor. On December 28, 1929, he was nominated cathedratic professor, teaching algebra and infinitesimal calculus.

As a student Caraça was on the administrative council of the Portuguese Popular University at its foundation in 1919, and in 1928 he became president. He organised the University's library and several conferences about mathematics, art, history, and other topics.

Caraça was one of the founders of the Portuguese Mathematical Society in 1940, and from 1945 to 1945 served as joint president alongside Aureliano de Mira Fernandes. Caraça founded the journal Gazeta de Matemática in 1940 with mathematicians António Aniceto Monteiro, Hugo Ribeiro, José da Silva Paulo and Manuel Zaluar Nunes.

Caraça died on 25 June 1948.

== Tributes ==
There is a residential town square in Santarém, Portugal named after him.
