= Nalini Anantharaman =

French mathematician

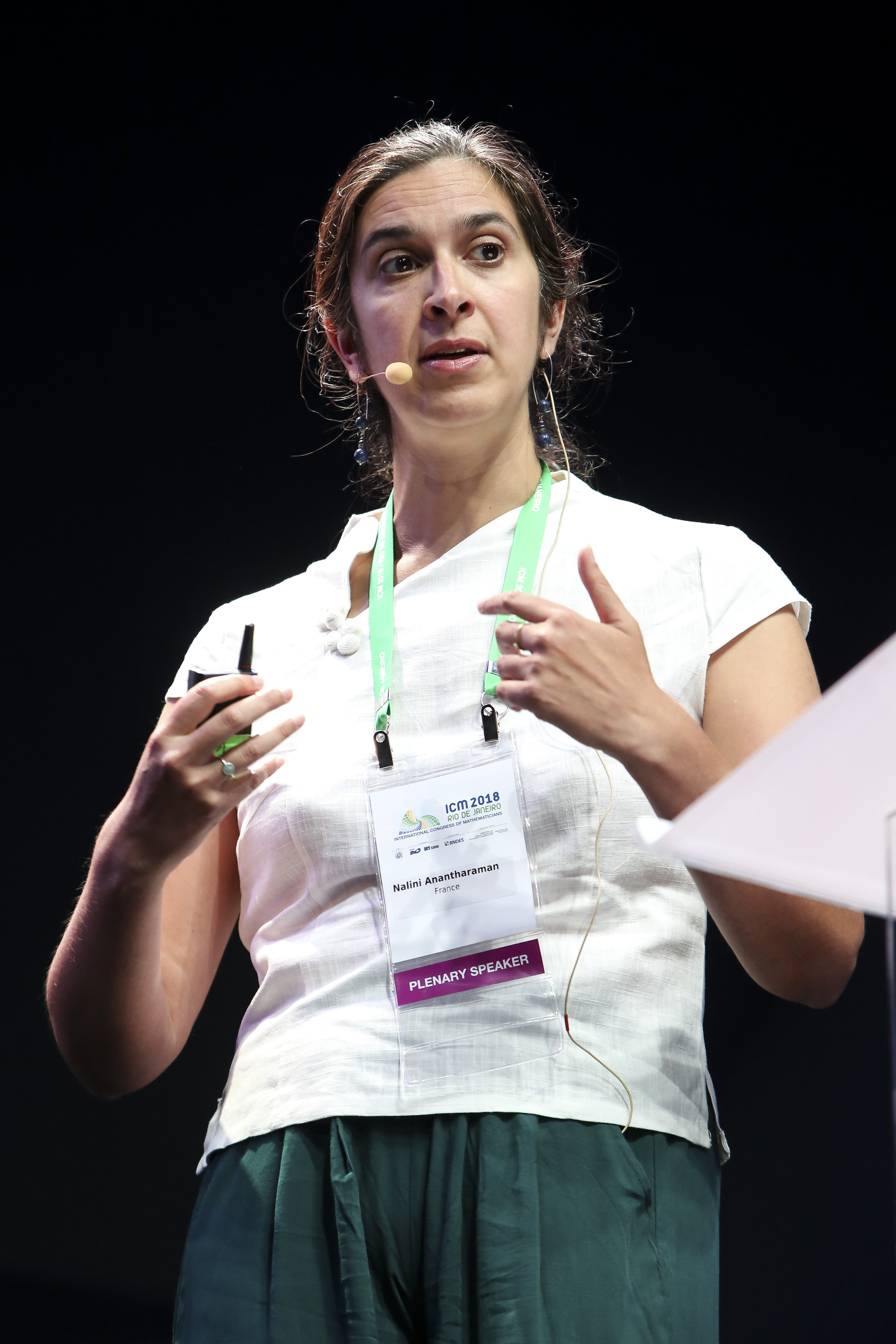
- Anantharaman at the ICM 2018
- Born: 26 February 1976 (age 50); Paris, France
- Education: École Normale Supérieure; Université Pierre et Marie Curie (PhD)
- Awards: Salem Prize (2011); Grand Prix Jacques Herbrand (2011); Henri Poincaré Prize (2012); Infosys Prize in Mathematical Sciences (2018); Nemmers Prize in Mathematics (2020)
- Scientific career
- Fields: Mathematical physics
- Thesis: Géodésiques fermées d'une surface sous contraintes homologiques (2000)
- Doctoral advisor: François Ledrappier
- Doctoral students: Laura Monk

Nalini Florence Anantharaman (born 26 February 1976) is an Indian-French mathematician known for her work in mathematical physics and analysis. She is currently a professor at the University of Strasbourg. She has won major prizes for her work, including the Henri Poincaré Prize in 2012.

== Life ==
Nalini Florence Anantharaman was born in Paris in 1976 to a Tamil Indian father and French mother. Her father and her mother are Professors at the University of Orléans. She entered Ecole Normale Supérieure in 1994. She completed her Ph.D. in Paris under the supervision of François Ledrappier in 2000 at Université Pierre et Marie Curie (Paris 6).

She became a full Professor, at the Paris-Sud University, in 2009 following time out at the University of California, Berkeley in the year before as a Visiting Miller professor. From January to June 2013 at the Institute for Advanced Study. She is now a Professor at Université de Strasbourg and holder of the Spectral Geometry chair at the Collège de France.

== Recognition ==
In 2012 she was one of four recipients of the Henri Poincaré Prize for mathematical physics, along with Freeman Dyson, Barry Simon and fellow Frenchwoman Sylvia Serfaty. Anantharaman was included for her work in "quantum chaos, dynamical systems and Schrödinger equations, including a remarkable advance in the problem of quantum unique ergodicity". In 2011 she won the Salem Prize which is awarded for work associated with Fourier Series. She also received the Grand Prix Jacques Herbrand from the French Academy of Sciences in 2011. In 2015, Anantharaman was elected to be a member of the Academia Europaea. She was an invited plenary speaker at the 2018 International Congress of Mathematicians.

In 2018, for her work related to “Quantum Chaos”, Anantharaman won the Infosys Prize (in Mathematical Sciences category), one of the highest monetary awards in India that recognize excellence in science and research. In 2020 she received the Nemmers Prize in Mathematics.

== Selected writings ==
- Anantharaman, Nalini (1 September 2008). "Entropy and the localization of eigenfunctions". Annals of Mathematics. 168 (2). Annals of Mathematics: 435–475. doi:10.4007/annals.2008.168.435. ISSN 0003-486X.
- Anantharaman, Nalini; Koch, Herbert; Nonnenmacher, Stéphane (2009). "Entropy of Eigenfunctions". New Trends in Mathematical Physics. Dordrecht: Springer Netherlands. arXiv:0704.1564. doi:10.1007/978-90-481-2810-5_1. ISBN 978-90-481-2809-9. S2CID 39219368.
- Anantharaman, Nalini; Nonnenmacher, Stéphane (2007). "Half-delocalization of eigenfunctions for the Laplacian on an Anosov manifold". Annales de l'Institut Fourier. 57 (7). Cellule MathDoc/CEDRAM: 2465–2523. arXiv:math-ph/0610019. doi:10.5802/aif.2340. ISSN 0373-0956. S2CID 41613433.
