= E. Andrew Balas =

American academic

Andrew Balas
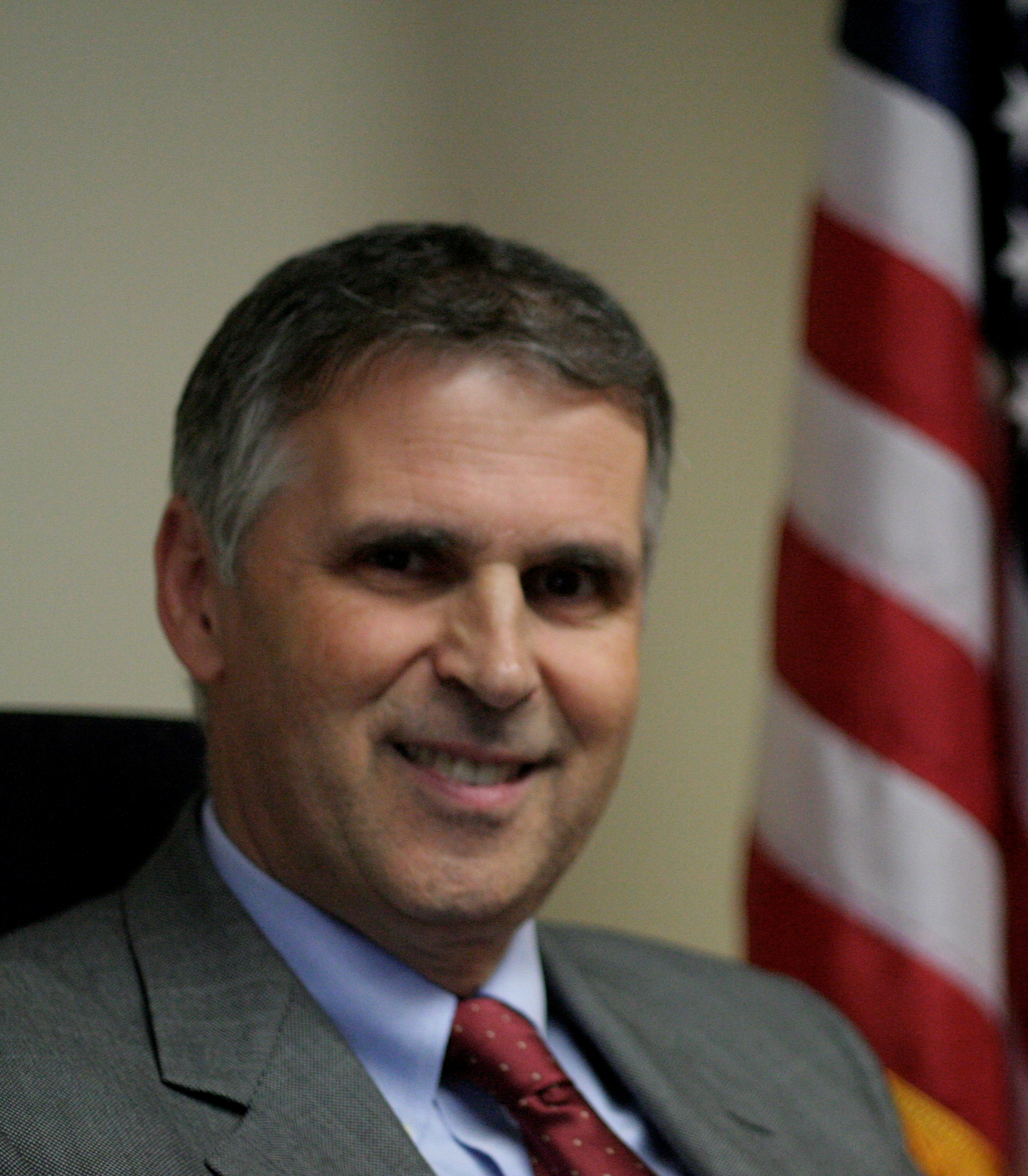
- Born: Budapest, Hungary
- Citizenship: United States; Hungary
- Education: Semmelweis University; Eötvös Loránd University; University of Utah
- Known for: Translational research
- Scientific career
- Fields: Health informatics Innovation; Life Sciences Innovation
- Workplaces: Semmelweis University; European Renal Association – European Dialysis and Transplant Association; Intermountain Healthcare; University of Missouri; Old Dominion University; Georgia Regents University

E. Andrew Balas is a Hungarian academic who is a fellow of the American College of Medical Informatics and elected member of the European Academy of Sciences and Arts. He serves as Professor at Augusta University (formerly Medical College of Georgia). Balas is Vice President of the Friends of the National Library of Medicine.

== Early years and education ==
Andrew Balas was born in Budapest as the third child of Balás Gábor, an attorney, journal editor and historian. After having finished the secondary school Piarista Gimnázium (Budapest), he studied general medicine at Semmelweis University where he graduated MD in 1977, ranked first in the medical school class. He started working as a research faculty member in the Computing Center at Semmelweis University. Simultaneously he enrolled in the mathematics program of Eötvös Loránd University. Among his professors were Paul Erdős and László Babai. He graduated with an MS in Applied Mathematics in 1983.

In 1984 he worked for the Registry of the European Dialysis and Transplant Association (London, UK). After returning to Budapest he worked as associate director of the Institute of Health Care Organization, Planning and Informatics for 4 years. In 1988 he moved to the United States. Working as a research fellow at Intermountain Healthcare in Salt Lake City, he enrolled in the medical informatics PhD program of the University of Utah and graduated in 1991.

== Academic career ==
In 1991, Andrew Balas joined the University of Missouri in Columbia as assistant professor. He quickly rose to the rank of tenured full Professor, Director of the Missouri European Union Center and Weil Distinguished Professor of Health Policy at the University of Missouri. Subsequently, he served as Dean of the Saint Louis University School of Public Health and later Dean of the College of Health Sciences at Old Dominion University in Norfolk, Virginia. At Augusta University, his subsequent service as Dean launched new programs, increased funded research and expanded services to the community.

His expertise includes development of priorities for innovative research responsive to societal needs, performance measurement of university technology transfer, and application of advanced digital technologies for translating biomedical research to practice. Among others, Andrew Balas is the lead author of the landmark study on the transfer of research evidence from clinical trials to patient care. The widely cited study estimated that it would take an average of 17 years to put new scientific evidence into practice.

Andrew Balas also served as consultant to Centene Corporation (St. Louis), Zynx Health (Los Angeles), Humana Health Care Plans (Kansas City), Scottish Rite Children’s Medical Center (Atlanta), Group Health Plan (St. Louis), Missouri State Medical Association (Jefferson City). His academic credentials include over 100 publications, externally funded research in excess of 10 million dollar and publications that cumulatively attracted thousands of citations.

== Policy Development ==
Andrew Balas's scholarly activities have been focused on digital knowledge management for health care improvement. He studies have explored delay and waste in the transfer of research results to health care.

During the 105th Congress, Andrew Balas served as a Congressional Fellow for the Public Health and Safety Subcommittee of the United States Senate. He drafted the reauthorization act that created the Agency for Healthcare Research and Quality (AHRQ) and launched one of the first government initiatives to prevent health care errors (Healthcare Research and Quality Act of 1999).

== Family ==
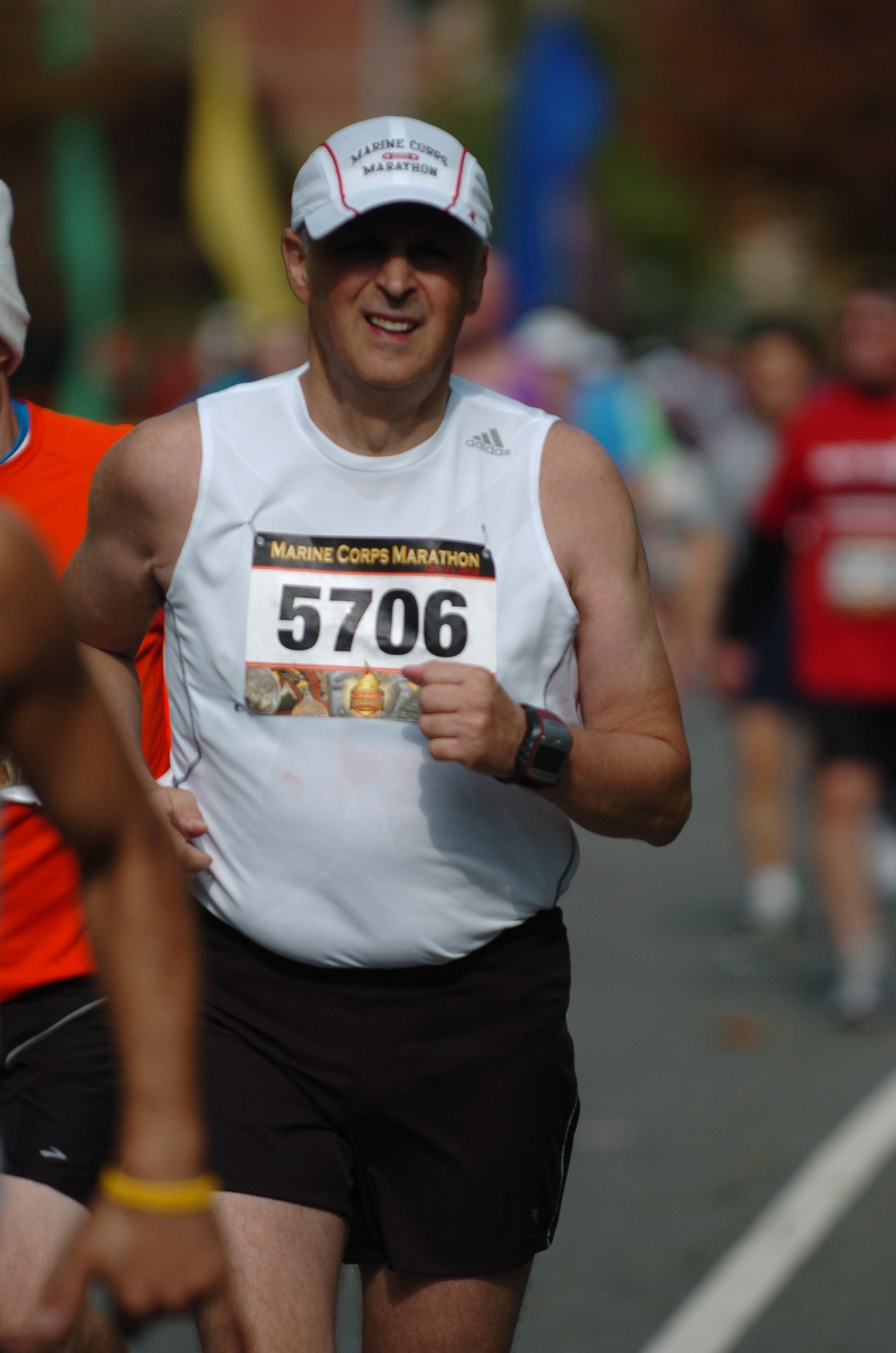
Andrew Balas running the Marine Corps Marathon in 2010

Andrew and his wife Louise Thai, award winning microbiology educator, have two grown sons, a physician in California and an investment executive in London, UK.

Andrew completes the annual Marine Corps Marathon every year since 2005.

== Notable Epigrams ==
From his book titled "Science and Standing Ground: Minority Success in the Knowledge Society" (Tortoma, 2012):

- "Great discoveries start in minority"
- "If you have never been in minority, you have never said anything original."
- "Science is replicable and generalizable knowledge"
- "We need birds that can not only sing but also lay eggs"
- "It is worth looking back before moving forward"
- "The devil is often in the big picture, not in the details"
- "Success is built on listening to others"
- "Thank you is a magnetic compass that shows directions and attracts friends"
