= René Maurice Fréchet =

French mathematician (1878–1973)

Maurice Fréchet
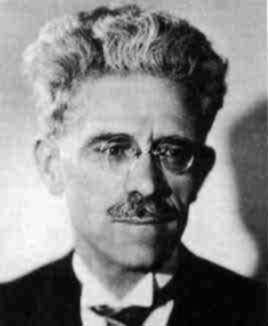
- Maurice Fréchet
- Born: 2 September 1878; Maligny, France
- Died: 4 June 1973 (aged 94); Paris, France
- Education: École Normale Supérieure
- Known for: Metric spaces, Fréchet spaces, Fréchet distribution, Fréchet distance, Fréchet filter
- Scientific career
- Fields: Mathematics
- Workplaces: University of Bordeaux; University of Strasbourg; École des Hautes-Études; École Normale Supérieure
- Doctoral advisor: Jacques Hadamard
- Doctoral students: Nachman Aronszajn; Robert Fortet; Jean Ville; Đuro Kurepa; Ky Fan; Antonio Monteiro

René Maurice Fréchet (French: [ʁəne mɔʁis fʁeʃɛ, moʁ-]; 2 September 1878 – 4 June 1973) was a French mathematician. He made major contributions to general topology and was the first to define metric spaces. He also made several important contributions to the field of statistics and probability, as well as calculus. His dissertation opened the entire field of functionals on metric spaces and introduced the notion of compactness. Independently of Riesz, he discovered the representation theorem in the space of Lebesgue square integrable functions. He is often referred to as the founder of the theory of abstract spaces.

== Biography ==
=== Early life ===
He was born to a Protestant family in Maligny to Jacques and Zoé Fréchet. At the time of his birth, his father was a director of a Protestant orphanage in Maligny and was later appointed a head of a Protestant school; but under the Jules Ferry laws lost his job. His mother set up a boarding house for foreigners in Paris; and in due course his father found a teaching position within the secular system.

Maurice attended the secondary school Lycée Buffon in Paris where he was taught mathematics by Jacques Hadamard. Hadamard recognised the potential of young Maurice and decided to tutor him on an individual basis. After Hadamard moved to the University of Bordeaux in 1894, Hadamard continuously wrote to Fréchet, setting him mathematical problems and harshly criticising his errors. Much later Fréchet admitted that the problems caused him to live in a continual fear of not being able to solve some of them, even though he was very grateful for the special relationship with Hadamard he was privileged to enjoy.

After completing high-school Fréchet was required to enroll in military service. This is the time when he was deciding whether to study mathematics or physics – he chose mathematics out of dislike of the chemistry classes he would have had to take otherwise. Thus in 1900 he enrolled to École Normale Supérieure to study mathematics.

He started publishing quite early, having published four papers in 1903. He also published some of his early papers with the American Mathematical Society due to his contact with American mathematicians in Paris—particularly Edwin Wilson.

=== Middle life ===
Fréchet served at many different institutions during his academic career. From 1907 to 1908 he served as a professor of mathematics at the Lycée in Besançon, then moved in 1908 to the Lycée in Nantes to stay there for a year. After that he served at the University of Poitiers between 1910 and 1919.

In 1908 he married Suzanne Carrive (1881–1945). They had four children: Hélène, Henri, Denise and Alain.

=== First World War ===
Fréchet was planning to spend a year in the United States at the University of Illinois, but his plan was disrupted when the First World War broke out in 1914. He was mobilised on 4 August the same year. Because of his diverse language skills, gained when his mother ran the establishment for foreigners, he served as an interpreter for the British Army. However, this was not a safe job; he spent two and a half years very near to or at the front. French egalitarian ideals caused many academics to be mobilised. They served in the trenches and many of them were lost during the war. It is remarkable that during his service in the war, he still managed to produce cutting edge mathematical papers frequently, despite having little time to devote to mathematics.

=== After the war ===
After the end of the war, Fréchet was chosen to go to Strasbourg to help with the reestablishment of the university. He served as a professor of higher analysis and Director of the Mathematics Institute. Despite being burdened with administrative work, he was again able to produce a large amount of high-quality research.

In 1928 Fréchet decided to move back to Paris, thanks to encouragement from Borel, who was then chair in the Calculus of Probabilities and Mathematical Physics at the Sorbonne. Fréchet briefly held a position of lecturer at the Sorbonne's Rockefeller Foundation and from 1928 was a Professor (without a chair). Fréchet was promoted to tenured Chair of General Mathematics in 1933 and to Chair of Differential and Integral Calculus in 1935. In 1941 Fréchet succeeded Borel as chair in the Calculus of Probabilities and Mathematical Physics, a position Fréchet held until he retired in 1949. From 1928 to 1935 Fréchet was also put in charge of lectures at the École Normale Supérieure; in this latter capacity Fréchet was able to direct a significant number of young mathematicians toward research in probability, including Doeblin, Fortet, Loève, and Jean Ville.

Despite his major achievements, Fréchet was not overly appreciated in France. As an illustration, while being nominated numerous times, he was not elected a member of the Académie des sciences until the age of 78. In 1929 he became foreign member of the Polish Academy of Arts and Sciences and in 1950 foreign member of the Royal Netherlands Academy of Arts and Sciences.

Fréchet was an Esperantist, publishing some papers and articles in that constructed language. He also served as president of the Internacia Scienca Asocio Esperantista ("International Scientific Esperantist Association") from 1950 to 1953.

== Main works ==
His first major work was his outstanding 1906 PhD thesis Sur quelques points du calcul fonctionnel, on the calculus of functionals. Here Fréchet introduced the concept of a metric space, although the name is due to Hausdorff. Fréchet's level of abstraction is similar to that in group theory, proving theorems within a carefully chosen axiomatic system that can then be applied to a large array of particular cases.

Here is a list of his most important works, in chronological order:

- Sur les opérations linéaires I–III, 1904–1907 (On linear operators)
- Les Espaces abstraits, 1928 (Abstract spaces)
- Recherches théoriques modernes sur la théorie des probabilités, 1937–1938 (Modern theoretical research in the theory of probability)
- Les Probabilités associées à un système d'événements compatibles et dépendants, 1939–1943 (Probabilities Associated with a System of Compatible and Dependent Events)
- Pages choisies d'analyse générale, 1953 (Selected Pages of General Analysis)
- Les Mathématiques et le concret, 1955 (Mathematics and the concrete)

Fréchet also developed ideas from the article Deux types fondamentaux de distribution statistique (1938; an English translation The Two Fundamental Types of Statistical Distribution) of Czech geographer, demographer and statistician Jaromír Korčák.

Fréchet is sometimes credited with the introduction of what is now known as the Cramér–Rao bound, but Fréchet's 1940s lecture notes on the topic appear to have been lost.

== Family ==
In 1908 he married Suzanne Carrive.

== See also ==
- Differentiation in Fréchet spaces
- F-space
- Fréchet derivative
- Fréchet distance
- Fréchet distribution
- Fréchet filter
- Fréchet inequalities
- Fréchet–Kuratowski theorem
- Fréchet mean
- Fréchet space
- Fréchet–Urysohn space
- Functional analysis
- Topological space
