= Edith Balas =

Romanian–American art historian (1929-2025)

- Born: June 20, 1929; Cluj, Kingdom of Romania
- Died: November 16, 2024 (aged 95); Boca Raton, Florida
- Citizenship: American
- Education: University of Bucharest, M.A. (1952); University of Pittsburgh, Ph.D. (1973)
- Occupation: Professor of Art History
- Years active: 1977–present
- Employer: Carnegie Mellon University
- Spouse: Egon Balas

Edith Balas (June 20, 1929 – November 16, 2024) was a Romanian-born American Professor of Art History, College of Humanities & Social Sciences at Carnegie Mellon University in Pittsburgh, Pennsylvania.

== Biography ==
Balas was born in 1929 in Cluj (present-day Romania); she was a Holocaust survivor. She was the widow of the late mathematician Egon Balas, who was a fellow professor at Carnegie Mellon.

Balas' main areas of interest were modern art (1890-1960), painting and sculpture, and the art of the Italian Renaissance. In 2003, she curated an exhibition at the Frick Art Museum, and several in Pittsburgh, Paris, New York and Budapest. She began teaching at Carnegie Mellon University in 1977, where she was also an adjunct professor of History of Art and Architecture at the University of Pittsburgh.

Balas was also a Holocaust survivor, having been sent to the Nazi death camp Auschwitz. In Bird in Flight: Memoir of a Survivor and Scholar, Balas tells her story of facing grim situations and becoming what she describes as a “professional survivor.” Balas named her memoir “Bird in Flight” after Constantin Brâncuși’s famous sculpture of the same name. “I consider it emblematic of my life,” she said.

After the war, her husband was imprisoned by the communist authorities for three years, during which Balas raised their two daughters. She received an M.A. in philosophy from the University of Bucharest in 1952. She then emigrated to the United States with her husband, and received an M.A. in the History of Arts from Pittsburgh University in 1970 and a Ph.D. in 1973.

== Works ==
- Balas, Edith (2008). Brancusi and his world. Pittsburgh: Carnegie Mellon University Press. ISBN 978-0887484896.
- Balas, Edith (2006). Brancusi & Romanian folk traditions. Pittsburgh: Carnegie Mellon University Press. ISBN 978-0887484599.
- Balas, Edith (2004). Michelangelo's double self-portraits. Pittsburgh: Carnegie Mellon University Press. ISBN 978-0887484179.
- Balas, Edith (2002). The Mother Goddess in Italian Renaissance art. Pittsburgh: Carnegie Mellon University Press. ISBN 978-0887483813.
- Balas, Edith (1998). Joseph Csáky : a pioneer of modern sculpture. Philadelphia: American Philososphical Society. ISBN 978-0871692306.
- Balas, Edith (1995). Michelangelo's Medici Chapel : a new interpretation. Philadelphia: American Philosophical Society. ISBN 978-0871692160.
- Balas, Edith (2002). The Holocaust in the painting of Valentin Lustig. Pittsburgh: Carnegie Mellon University Press. ISBN 978-0887483738.
- Koerner, Henry (2003). The early work of Henry Koerner. Pittsburgh, Pa: Frick Art & Historical Center. ISBN 978-0970342553.
- Balas, Edith (2010). Bird in flight : memoir of a survivor and scholar. Pittsburgh: Carnegie Mellon University Press. ISBN 978-0887485381.
- Edith Balas, "Michelangelo's Medici Chapel: A New Interpretation", Philadelphia, 1995

== See also ==
- List of Holocaust survivors
