= Portuguese Mathematical Society =

Portuguese learned society

The Portuguese Mathematical Society (Portuguese: Sociedade Portuguesa de Matemática, SPM) is the mathematical society of Portugal, and was founded in Lisbon on December 12, 1940. Its objectives are the development of education and the dissemination and promotion of mathematical research in Portugal.

The Portuguese Mathematical Society publishes the journals Portugaliæ Mathematica, Boletim SPM, Gazeta de Matemática, and has published several books. Its activities include the organization of congresses, conferences, scientific meetings, and training courses for teachers. The SPM organizes the Portuguese Mathematical Olympiad.

== History ==
The 1930s and 1940s mathematicians such as Bento de Jesus Caraça, Ruy Luís Gomes, Alfredo Pereira Gomes, António Aniceto Monteiro and Hugo Ribeiro, among others, gave a new life to mathematics research in Portugal. They successfully promoted several projects, including the scientific journal Portugaliæ Mathematica (1937), the Mathematical Seminar in Lisbon (1938), the Center of Mathematical Studies Applied to Economics (1938), the magazine Gazeta de Matemática (1939) and the Mathematical Studies Center in Lisbon and Oporto (1940 and 1942, respectively). It was in this context that on 12 December 1940, the Portuguese Mathematical Society (SPM) was founded.

The first board of directors was constituted by Pedro José da Cunha (President), Victor Hugo Duarte Lemos (Vice President), António Aniceto Monteiro (General Secretary), Manuel Zaluar Nunes (Treasurer), Maria Pilar Baptista Ribeiro and Augusto Sá da Costa (1st and 2nd Secretaries). Ruy Luís Gomes and Bento de Jesus Caraga were also key pieces in the development of the Society, which has gathered a considerable number of members from the beginning.

But since its creation the Society has faced many difficulties due to the political events occurred during the 20th century in Portugal. The dictatorial regime didn't allow the registration of SPM, which was legalized only after the revolution of 1974, in October 10 of 1977 - almost 40 years after its foundation.

During the regime mathematicians and scientists in general have been persecuted, and in 1945 António Aniceto Monteiro was forced to leave the country. In 1946 and 1947 the government has unleashed an offensive against the Universities, preventing Bento de Jesus Caraça, Ruy Luís Gomes, Zaluar Nunes, Hugo Ribeiro, Alfredo Pereira Gomes, among others, from pursuing their careers. The Mathematics centers were virtually extinct and the Mathematics Clubs, created by SPM, were declared illegal and banned.

The Portuguese Mathematical Society was prevented from holding its normal meetings because gatherings of many people displeased the political authorities. Moreover, it was forbidden to elect another committee. Pressured by PIDE- the political police - many founding members of SPM departed into exile and the Society activity declined. Although some magazines have remained - such as Portugaliæ Mathematica, thanks to Zaluar Nunes efforts, and Gazeta de Matemática, thanks to Gaspar Teixeira - Mathematics in Portugal entered a numbness period.

Despite these almost impossible circumstances the Portuguese Mathematical Society did manage to avoid total extinction, although it could not function in any meaningful way.

Only after the revolution of April 25, 1974, SPM was able to fully work and achieve the objectives set by its founders: to promote mathematical knowledge and the quality of mathematics teaching and to disseminate the Portuguese mathematical research.

Portugaliae Mathematica had been published since 1939 and continued to be published through the years when the Society could not function. However, with the Society flourishing again, it took over control of the journal. The Society took on its role of organising meetings and conferences and began to organize Olympiad competitions in 1980. In 1989, Portugal participated in the International Mathematics Olympiad competition for the first time.

== Governing body ==
The 2022-2024 governing body is composed of:

- President: José Carlos Santos, University of Porto
- Vice president: Fernando Pestana da Costa, Universidade Aberta
- Vice president: Isabel Hormigo, University of Lisbon
- Treasurer: Joana Teles, University of Coimbra

Other voting members:

- Maria Clementina Timóteo, University of Lisbon
- Frederico Valsassina Amaral, Colégio Valsassina, Lisbon
- Luís Roçadas, University of Trás-os-Montes and Alto Douro
- Óscar Felgueiras, University of Porto
- Paulo Vasconcelos, University of Porto
- Pedro Patrício, University of Minho
- Pedro Serranho, Universidade Aberta

=== Past presidents ===
The past presidents of the Portuguese Mathematical Society are:

- Pedro José da Cunha, 1941–1943
- Aureliano de Mira Fernandes and Bento de Jesus Caraça, 1943–1945
- António Augusto Ferreira de Macedo, 1945–1947
- António Manuel Zaluar Nunes, 1947

From 1947 to 10 October 1977, the SPM was an illegal organisation in Portugal.

- João Cosme Santos Guerreiro (as general secretary), 1980–1982
- António Gabriel da Silva St'Aubyn (as general secretary), 1982–1986
- Graciano Neves de Oliveira (as general secretary), 1986–1988
- António Ribeiro Gomes (as general secretary), 1988–1990
- Artur Soares Alves, 1990–1992
- António Gabriel da Silva St'Aubyn, 1992–1994
- Natália Bebiano, 1994–1996
- Graciano Neves de Oliveira, 1996–2000
- Ana Bela Cruzeiro, 2000–2004
- Nuno Crato, 2004–2010
- Miguel Abreu, 2010–2014
- Fernando Pestana da Costa, 2014–2016
- Jorge Buescu, 2016–2018
- Filipe Oliveira (mathematician), 2018–2020
- João Araújo, 2020–2022
- José Carlos Santos, 2022–2024
