= Ashkan Nikeghbali =

French mathematician and professor

- Born: 1975 (age 49–50)
- Occupation: mathematician
- Employer: University of Zurich

Ashkan Nikeghbali Cisakht (Persian: اشکان نیک‌اقبالی; born September 15, 1975) is a French mathematician and university professor of Iranian descent. He holds the chair of Financial Mathematics at the University of Zurich.

== Academic career ==
Nikeghbali obtained his PhD at the Pierre and Marie Curie University in 2005 with the thesis "Temps aléatoires, filtrations et sous-martingales: quelques développements récents", supervised by Marc Yor. Prior to that, he was a researcher from February 2004 to July 2004 at the Isaac Newton Institute on the topic of "Random matrix approaches in number theory." After completing his PhD, Nikeghbali first worked as a postdoctoral researcher at the American Institute of Mathematics (under the direction of Brian Conrey) at University of Rochester. In June 2006, he was appointed Heinz-Hopf Lecturer at ETH Zurich. In March 2007, Nikeghbali was appointed assistant professor at the Institute of Mathematics at the University of Zurich. He was promoted to Extraordinary Professor of Applied Mathematics there in 2009.

== Research ==
Nikeghbali's research focuses on financial mathematics, probability theory, and analytic number theory. In particular, he works in the areas of portfolio theory, stochastic processes, random operators and matrices, and the application of stochastics in number theory and combinatorics.

In asymptotic probability theory, Nikeghbali, together with Féray, Méliot, and Kowalski introduced the concept of Mod-Ф convergence. In number theory, he, together with Chhaibi and Najnudel, introduced the concept of stochastic zeta function.

Nikeghbali supervised at least six PhD students during his time at the University of Zurich.

== Other activities ==
Member of the world.minds community since 2008. Member of the Scientific Advisory Board of swissQuant. Member of the advisory board of EVMTech. Strategy advisor for data analysis and modeling of stochastic processes at Roche Holding in Basel.

== Awards ==
Honorary doctorate from the University of Alba Iulia in Romania.

== Publications ==
- Féray, Valentin; Méliot, Pierre-Loïc; Nikeghbali, Ashkan (2016). Mod-ϕ Convergence: Normality Zones and Precise Deviations. SpringerBriefs in Probability and Mathematical Statistics. Cham: Springer International Publishing. doi:10.1007/978-3-319-46822-8. ISBN 978-3-319-46821-1.
- Montgomery, Hugh; Nikeghbali, Ashkan; Rassias, Michael Th., eds. (2017). Exploring the Riemann Zeta Function. 190 Years from Riemann's Birth. Cham: Springer International Publishing. doi:10.1007/978-3-319-59969-4. ISBN 978-3-319-59968-7.
- Nikeghbali, Ashkan; Pardalos, Panos M.; Raigorodskii, Andrei M.; Rassias, Michael Th., eds. (2022). High-Dimensional Optimization and Probability: With a View Towards Data Science. Springer Optimization and Its Applications. Vol. 191. Cham: Springer International Publishing. doi:10.1007/978-3-031-00832-0. ISBN 978-3-031-00831-3.
