= José Sebastião e Silva =

Portuguese mathematician (1914–1972)

- Born: 12 December 1914; Mértola, Alentejo, Portugal
- Died: 25 May 1972 (aged 57); Lisbon, Portugal
- Education: University of Lisbon
- Scientific career
- Fields: Mathematics
- Workplaces: Technical University of Lisbon

José Sebastião e Silva (12 December 1914 in Mértola – 25 May 1972 in Lisbon) was a Portuguese mathematician who made contributions to functional analysis, distribution theory, and mathematical education. After graduating from the University of Lisbon in 1937 and earning his doctorate in 1949, he taught at the Instituto Superior de Agronomia before becoming Director of the Centre for Mathematical Studies at the University of Lisbon. Silva is particularly remembered for his influential approach to teaching calculus, which combined intuitive understanding with mathematical rigour, and for his co-authored textbook Compêndio de Álgebra that shaped mathematics education in Portugal for decades. His pedagogical methods emphasised introducing students to mathematical concepts through concrete examples before progressing to formal definitions.

== Early life and education ==
Born in Mértola, Silva graduated in mathematics from the University of Lisbon in 1937. In 1942 he received a grant from the Instituto de Alta Cultura to study in Rome, where he worked with members of the Italian school of algebraic geometry. His first doctoral thesis on geometric transformations was rejected by Federigo Enriques, so he composed a second on functional analysis, earning his doctorate in 1949 from the University of Lisbon.

== Academic career ==
From 1951 to 1961, Silva was professor of mathematics at the Instituto Superior de Agronomia. He then returned to the University of Lisbon as Director of the Centre for Mathematical Studies, a post he held for twenty years. His research spanned analytic functionals, the theory of distributions (including vector‑valued distributions and ultradistributions), the operational calculus, and differential calculus in locally convex spaces.

== Educational contributions ==
In 1951, Silva argued in the journal Gazeta de Matemática that infinitesimal calculus ought to be reintroduced into secondary education, warning that "when nothing is sown, what can be harvested?" and stressing that first exposure to the ideas of function and limit should occur in lyceum classrooms.

Two years later, in partnership with José da Silva Paulo, he co‑authored the Portuguese: Compêndio de Álgebra (first ed. 1956; second ed. 1957), which was selected by national competition as the official algebra textbook for Portugal’s third‑cycle lyceums until 1968. Silva's pedagogical design unfolds as follows:

1. Introduction of the concept of infinitesimal as a more intuitive precursor to limits.
2. Successive treatment of limits of sequences followed by limits of functions.
3. Continuity of a function.
4. Definition of the derivative via the limit:

$f'(x_0) =\lim_{x\to x_0}\frac{f(x)-f(x_0)}{x-x_0} =\lim_{h\to 0}\frac{f(x_0+h)-f(x_0)}{h}$ where $f'(x_0)$ denotes the rate of change of $f$ at $x_0$.

To avoid abstraction, Silva began with the mechanical notion of velocity—interpreting the slope of a distance–time graph as speed—and the geometric notion of slope (coefficient of a secant line approaching the tangent on a curve). Only after these concrete and symbolic motivations did he present the formal ε–δ definition, reserving rigorous mathematical proofs for higher education.

This sequence closely mirrors David Tall's "three worlds" of mathematics—corporeal (sensory intuition), symbolic (manipulation of algebraic expressions) and formal (axiomatic proof)—by weaving together concrete examples, algebraic computation and formal definitions in a single narrative.

Analyses of lyceum students' notebooks from 1978 confirm that Silva's examples—such as computing the derivative of $x^2$ at a given point—were reproduced verbatim in class, and that subsequent textbooks built on his approach by adding lateral derivative concepts and further exercises while preserving his intuitive framework.

== Legacy ==
Silva's integration of intuition and rigour in teaching the derivative shaped Portuguese mathematics education for decades. The Compêndio de Álgebra remained a pedagogical benchmark long after its official adoption, and successor texts continued to draw on his method of motivating abstract definitions through concrete phenomena.
