= Take Six =

Short-story anthology of Portuguese women writers

- Cover painting by Paula Rego
- Author: Margaret Jull Costa (ed.)
- Translators: Multiple
- Language: English
- Genre: Short stories; Anthology
- Published: 2018
- Publisher: Dedalus Books
- Pages: 250
- ISBN: 9781910213698

Take Six, subtitled Six Portuguese Women Writers, is an anthology of short stories compiled by the translator, Margaret Jull Costa. It contains the work, presented in the order of year of birth, of Sophia de Mello Breyner Andresen (1919–2004), Maria Judite de Carvalho (1921–1998), Agustina Bessa-Luís (1922–2019), Teolinda Gersão (born 1940), Lídia Jorge (born 1946), and Hélia Correia (born 1949).

== Description ==
Jull Costa describes the book as a "double celebration, firstly, of six brilliant Portuguese women writers and, secondly, of the short story form, at which they all excel". While some of the stories had been translated into English before, many had not. She notes that all six have a keen sense of political injustice and repression and all are concerned about the position of women in society. However, the writing is never heavily moralistic. Stories and styles differ, but the authors have in common an ability to look afresh at everyday life.

The anthology consists of 20 stories. Most are fairly short, but So many people, Mariana by Carvalho runs to 47 pages. Jull Costa was the first person to translate Carvalho. The poetry of Andresen, who in 1999 was the first woman to be awarded the Camões Prize, the leading award for literature in the Portuguese language, is well-known outside of Portugal but her short stories less so. The five stories by Bessa-Luís, who won the Camões Prize in 2004, came from her collection Contas impopulares (Unpopular stories), written between 1951 and 1953, which were said at the time to have been influenced by the works of Franz Kafka. She is also considered to have been under-represented in the English language.

Gersão has been translated into English and 15 other languages but her five short stories appearing in Take Six were all translated by Jull Costa for the anthology. They are taken from two collections of Gersão's short stories: Histórias de ver e andar (2002) and A mulher que prendeu a chuva (2007). Jorge has written five collections of short stories. The three presented in Take Six were taken from Marido e Outros Contos (1992) and O Amor em Lobito Bay (2006). Jorge was also a winner of the Camões Prize, in 2026. Correia won the Camões Prize in 2015, a year after her book of short stories Vinte Degraus e Outros Contos was published, from which the three stories by her in Take Six have been selected.

In addition to Jull Costa, twelve other translators were involved with the anthology, in some cases with multiple translators working on one article. Andresen's The Silence involved an 8-person group translation, held in 2014 as part of a translation summer school, while The Bird Hypothesis by Jorge involved four translators at a 2015 summer school.

== Reviews ==
One reviewer noted that relatively few women writers are translated into English, and this anthology is an attempt to rectify that imbalance and to introduce readers to some truly captivating tales from Portugal. Writing in The Guardian, Oliver Balch agreed that few of Portugal's female novelists are translated into English, which is "as artistically regrettable as it is culturally telling". He considered that Take Six represents a "notable and important stab at setting the record straight. All the stories share a remarkable verve and freshness."
