= The Tragedy of the Street of Flowers =

Novel by the Portuguese writer José Maria de Eça de Queirós

- Cover of the 2009 reprint of the English-language version
- Author: José Maria de Eça de Queirós
- Original title: A Tragédia da Rua das Flores
- Translator: Margaret Jull Costa
- Cover artist: Marie Lane/ Carlos Botelho
- Language: Portuguese
- Series: Dedalus European Classics
- Genre: Realism
- Publisher: Dedalus
- Publication date: 1980
- Publication place: Portugal
- English publication date: 2000 reprinted in 2009
- Pages: 346
- ISBN: 9781873982648

The Tragedy of the Street of Flowers (Portuguese: A Tragédia da Rua das Flores) is a novel by José Maria de Eça de Queirós (1845 - 1900), also known as Eça de Queiroz. It was only first published in Portuguese in 1980. The first English version, translated by Margaret Jull Costa, was published by Dedalus Books in 2000, to coincide with the centenary of the author’s death.

== Background ==
This novel was written between 1877 and 1878 in Newcastle upon Tyne, where Eça was the Portuguese Consul. It was discovered amongst his papers after his death and remained unpublished for more than one hundred years, only being published in 1980 after copyrights expired. It is possible that the writer's family refused to publish the book earlier due to the fact that an incestuous relationship is the dominant feature of the story. For some commentators the novel was designed to serve as an outline for the author’s novel The Maias, as it contains resemblances between characters and events described; for others it has been seen as a draft for his novel Cousin Bazilio.

== Plot ==
The narrative focuses on the beautiful Joaquina (later known as Genoveva) who leaves her husband and child in Portugal and flees with a Spaniard to Spain, where she becomes a courtesan, eventually marrying a French Senator and moving to Paris. With the fall of Napoleon Bonaparte and the death of the husband, she returns to Lisbon where she attracts considerable attention both for her beauty and because of her mysterious history. She becomes a paid mistress of the unattractive, but rich, Dâmaso while, at the same time, falling in love with a young man called Vítor da Silva. Only after their love has been consummated does she learn that she is Vitor’s mother, and this leads to her suicide so that Vitor will not discover the truth.

== Reviews and analysis ==
While considered a fairly unpolished work that may not have been regarded by the author as his final version, the reviews have noted the high quality of the English translation. However, several commentators express surprise that, in her Introduction to the novel, the translator gives away the plot.

Although the story is tragic, the book is primarily a satirical portrait of 19th-century Lisbon society, a feature common to most of Eça’s work. It has been described as a “fascinating visit to a period with a very different approach to morality”, and as having “beautiful descriptions of 19th century Portuguese life with a huge amount of satire and societal critique layered thick on top.” A strong vein of both comedy and tragedy runs throughout, while Eca "delights in shocking in order to expose the puritanical, narrow-minded Portuguese society".

The satire begins early in the novel, when Genoveva throws a party. This allows Eça to describe typical characters from Lisbon society. The influence of the founder of literary realism, Honoré de Balzac (1799-1850), author of novels that depict Parisian society, can be detected. Particularly amusing is Camilo, “a pretentious artist, full of talk but little action, who goes on and on about art history and styles and technique, but never paints anything.” Eça “brilliantly dissects a world in which only surface counts, providing the reader with a vivid and gripping portrayal of a society and class consumed by hypocrisy, greed and materialism.”

Several writers have explored the role of incest in Eça’s works. Ponte notes that in Greek Tragedy incest represented the protagonist’s hopeless fight against fate. As an allegory for social decadence incest is found elsewhere in nineteenth-century literature, most notably in Émile Zola’s La Curée. In her Introduction to the book, the translator suggests that this could have been one reason why the book was published neither by Eça nor by his heirs, speculating that the incidents described were “too close to home”. Eça was born illegitimately and although his parents did eventually marry he lived apart from them until he was 21. In The Tragedy of the Street of Flowers, Vítor first sees his mother when he is 23.

== Film adaptation ==
In 1981, the book was adapted for a Portuguese television series, titled Homónimo, directed by Ferrão Katzenstein.

In 2012, a modernized version of the story was aired as a 50 minute TV special.
