= Margaret Jull Costa =

British translator (born 1949)

- Born: May 2, 1949 (age 77); London Borough of Richmond upon Thames, England
- Education: University of Bristol; Stanford University
- Occupation: Translator
- Writing career
- Language: English; Spanish; Portuguese
- Notable works: Translations of All the Names,The Maias
- Notable awards: Dublin Literary Award (1997)

Margaret Elisabeth Jull Costa OBE, OIH (born 2 May 1949) is a British translator of Portuguese- and Spanish-language fiction and poetry, including the works of Nobel Prize winner José Saramago, Eça de Queiroz, Fernando Pessoa, Paulo Coelho, Bernardo Atxaga, Carmen Martín Gaite, Javier Marías, and José Régio. She has won the Oxford-Weidenfeld Translation Prize more times than any other translator.

== Early life ==
Costa was born in Richmond upon Thames, England, in 1949.

== Education ==
She earned an undergraduate degree in Spanish and Portuguese from the University of Bristol before receiving a Fulbright Scholarship to Stanford University, where she achieved a Master of Arts.

== Writing career ==
In recent years she has been noted for her work in translating the novels of José Saramago, for which she won a number of awards. Her translations include All the Names, and Death at Intervals, about a country where death ceases to exist, was published in 2008.

As part of its "Europe 1992–2004" programme, the UK publishers Dedalus embarked on a series of new translations by Jull Costa of some of the major classics of Portuguese literature. These include seven works by Eça de Queiroz: Cousin Bazilio (1878, translation published 2003, funded by the Arts Council of England), The Tragedy of the Street of Flowers, The Mandarin (and Other Stories), The Relic, The Crime of Father Amaro, The Maias and The City and the Mountains (2008).

In 2006, she published the translation of the first part of Javier Marías's trilogy, Your Face Tomorrow 1: Fever and Spear. The second part, 2: Dance and Dream, was published in 2006, while the concluding part, 3: Poison, Shadow and Farewell, appeared in November 2009. This last volume won her the 2010 Premio Valle-Inclan.

Her English translation of The Accordionist's Son by the Basque author Bernardo Atxaga was published by Harvill Secker (2007) while her previous translations of Atxaga's work include The Lone Man (1996) and The Lone Woman (1999).

Her translation of The Maias by Eça de Queiroz was published by Dedalus Books in 2007. The original book was described by José Saramago as "the greatest book by Portugal's greatest novelist".

In 2008, as the first of a new Dedalus Euro Shorts series, Jull Costa made the first-ever English translation of Helena, or The Sea in Summer, Julián Ayesta's pointillist novel, first published in Spain in 1952 as Hélena o el mar del verano, and for which he is most remembered. Her biographical introduction to the book provides English-language readers with a brief but essential portrait of Ayesta (1919–1996), author, Spanish diplomat and outspoken critic of Francoist Spain.

Jull Costa has been a keen translator of women authors. She has also compiled anthologies, with translations by her and others, including the 2018 anthology Take Six: Six Portuguese women writers, with short stories by Sophia de Mello Breyner Andresen, Maria Judite de Carvalho, Agustina Bessa-Luís, Teolinda Gersão, Lídia Jorge, and Hélia Correia.

== Selected translations ==
- Alberto Barrera Tyszka – Crimes
- Alberto Barrera Tyszka – The Sickness
- Álvaro Pombo – The Hero of the Big House
- Ana Luísa Amaral – What's in a Name
- Ángela Vallvey – Happy Creatures
- Ángela Vallvey – Hunting the Last Wild Man
- António Lobo Antunes – The Land at the End of the World
- Antonio Tabucchi – Requiem: A Hallucination
- Arturo Pérez-Reverte – The Flanders Panel
- Arturo Pérez-Reverte – The Club Dumas
- Arturo Pérez-Reverte – The Fencing Master
- Benito Pérez Galdós – Tristana
- Bernardo Atxaga – Obabakoak
- Bernardo Atxaga – The Lone Man
- Bernardo Atxaga – The Lone Woman
- Bernardo Atxaga – The Adventures of Shola
- Bernardo Atxaga – Shola and the Lions
- Bernardo Atxaga – The Accordionist's Son
- Bernardo Atxaga – Water Over Stones
- Carmen Martín Gaite – Variable Cloud
- Carmen Martín Gaite – The Farewell Angel
- Diogo Mainardi – The Fall: A Father's Memoir in 424 Steps
- Fernando Pessoa – The Book of Disquiet
- Helen Constantine (editor) – Madrid Tales
- Javier García Sánchez – The Others
- Javier Marías – All Souls
- Javier Marías – The Man of Feeling
- Javier Marías – When I Was Mortal
- Javier Marias – Tomorrow in the Battle Think on Me
- Javier Marías – A Heart So White
- Javier Marías – The Infatuations
- Javier Marías – Thus Bad Begins
- Javier Marías – Berta Isla
- Javier Marías – Your Face Tomorrow: Fever and Spear
- Javier Marías – Your Face Tomorrow: Dance and Dream
- Javier Marías – Your Face Tomorrow: Poison, Shadow, and Farewell
- Javier Marías – While the Women Are Sleeping
- Javier Marías – Written Lives
- Jesús Carrasco – Out in the Open
- Jorge de Sena – The Prodigious Physician
- Eça de Queirós – The Maias
- Eça de Queirós – The City and the Mountains
- Eça de Queirós – The Crime of Father Amaro
- Eça de Queirós – Alves & Co. and Other Stories
- Eça de Queirós – The Mandarin and other stories
- Eça de Queirós – Cousin Bazilio
- Eça de Queirós – The Tragedy of the Street of Flowers
- Eça de Queirós – The Mystery of the Sintra Road (with Nick Phillips)
- Eça de Queirós – The Relic
- Eça de Queirós – The Illustrious House of Ramires
- José Régio – The Flame-Coloured Dress
- José Saramago – Death with Interruptions
- José Saramago – The Double
- José Saramago – Skylight
- José Saramago – The Elephant's Journey
- José Saramago – Cain
- José Saramago – All the Names
- José Saramago – The Cave
- José Saramago – Raised from the Ground
- José Saramago – Small Memories
- José Saramago – The Tale of the Unknown Island
- José Saramago – Seeing
- José Saramago – Blindness
- Juan José Saer – The Witness
- Julián Ayesta – Helena, or the Sea in Summer
- Júlio Dinis – An English Family
- Julio Llamazares – The Yellow Rain
- Lídia Jorge – The Painter of Birds
- Luís Cardoso – The Crossing: A Story of East Timor
- Luis Fernando Verissimo – Borges and the Eternal Orangutans
- Luis Fernando Verissimo – The Spies
- Luis Fernando Verissimo – The Club of Angels
- Luisa Valenzuela – Bedside Manners
- Luisa Valenzuela – Symmetries
- Machado de Assis – The Collected Stories of Machado de Assis
- Machado de Assis – Posthumous Memoirs of Brás Cubas
- Manuel Rivas – Butterfly's Tongue
- Marcos Giralt Torrente – Paris
- Mário de Sá-Carneiro – Lucio's Confession
- Mário de Sá-Carneiro – The Great Shadow And Other Stories
- Michel Laub – Diary of the Fall
- Paulo Coelho – Eleven Minutes
- Paulo Coelho – Like the Flowing River
- Paulo Coelho – The Zahir
- Paulo Coelho – Manuscript Found in Accra
- Paulo Coelho – Aleph
- Paulo Coelho – Adultery
- Paulo Coelho – Brida
- Paulo Coelho – Veronika Decides to Die
- Paulo Coelho – The Witch of Portobello
- Rafael Chirbes – On the Edge
- Rafael Sánchez Ferlosio – The Adventures of the Ingenious Alfanhi
- Rafael Sánchez Ferlosio – The River: El Jarama
- Ramón del Valle-Inclán – Spring and Summer Sonatas: The Memoirs of the Marquis of Bradomin
- Ramón del Valle-Inclán – Autumn & Winter Sonatas: The Memoirs of Marquis of Bradomin
- Sophia de Mello Breyner Andresen – The Perfect Hour (co-translator: Colin Rorrison)
- Teolinda Gersão – The Word Tree
- The Dedalus Book of Portuguese Fantasy
- The Dedalus Book of Spanish Fantasy

== Awards and honours ==
- 1992: Portuguese Translation Prize winner for translation of The Book of Disquiet by Fernando Pessoa
- 1996: Portuguese Translation Prize runner-up for translation of The Relic by Eça de Queiroz
- 1997: International Dublin Literary Award winner for translation of A Heart So White by Javier Marías
- 2000: Oxford-Weidenfeld Translation Prize winner for translation of All the Names by José Saramago
- 2002: Portuguese Translation Prize runner-up for translation of The Migrant Painter of Birds by Lídia Jorge
- 2006: Oxford-Weidenfeld Translation Prize shortlist for translation of Your Face Tomorrow 1: Fever and Spear by Javier Marías
- 2006: Arts Council, Spanish Embassy and Instituto Cervantes translation prize winner for Your Face Tomorrow 1: Fever and Spear by Javier Marías
- 2008: PEN/Book-of-the-Month Club Translation Prize winner for translation of The Maias by Eça de Queiroz
- 2008: Oxford-Weidenfeld Translation Prize winner for translation of The Maias by Eça de Queiroz
- 2010: Times Literary Supplement Translation Prize winner for translation of The Accordionist's Son by Bernardo Atxaga
- 2011: Oxford-Weidenfeld Translation Prize winner for translation of The Elephant's Journey by José Saramago
- 2012: Calouste Gulbenkian Prize winner for translation of The Word Tree by Teolinda Gersão
- 2012: Calouste Gulbenkian Prize runner-up for translation of The Land at the End of the World by António Lobo Antunes
- 2013: Fellow of the Royal Society of Literature
- 2014: Officer of the Order of the British Empire (OBE) in the 2014 Birthday Honours
- 2015: Jewish Quarterly-Wingate Prize winner for translation of Diary of the Fall
- 2015: Awarded the degree of Doctor of Letters honoris causa by the University of Leeds
- 2017: The Premio Valle-Inclán by the Society of Authors for her translation of On the Edge by Rafael Chirbes
- 2017: Officer of the Order of Prince Henry
