= Cartas de Inglaterra =

Collection of journalism by José Maria de Eça de Queirós

Cartas de Inglaterra ("Letters from England") is a collection of journalism by the 19th-century Portuguese novelist Eça de Queiroz. He worked in the Portuguese consular service and was stationed at Newcastle upon Tyne from late 1874 until April 1879; from then until 1888 he was at Bristol. During this period he published O Primo Basílio ("Cousin Bazilio") and Os Maias ("The Maias"), but he was also writing occasional London letters for the Lisbon daily newspaper Diário de Notícias. Some of these afterwards appeared in book form as Cartas de Inglaterra. The collection was published in English in 1970 as Letters from England with a translation by Ann Stevens. Six of the letters from this book were subsequently published, together with many other letters written by Eça when he lived in the United Kingdom, as Eça's English Letters, with additional translations by Alison Aiken.

== Outline of Cartas de Inglaterra ==
In its final published form Cartas de Inglaterra includes the following chapters:

1. Afeganistão e Irlanda, "Afghanistan and Ireland": a prophetic analysis, full of black humour, of two overseas adventures in which the British Empire was currently mired
2. Acerca de livros, "About books": London's autumn "seasons": yachting, shooting, hunting, angling, burglary, lectures, scientific congresses. The book season is the last to be sketched, with a special glance at the vast number of new travel books
3. O inverno em Londres, "Winter in London": London is to have a winter season this year
4. O Natal, "Christmas" and Father Christmas
5. Literatura de Natal, "Christmas books": books for children, a genre in which English literature was already rich, while Portuguese had scarcely any
6. Israelismo, "Judaism": the alarming growth of anti-Semitism in Germany in 1880, apparently with the tacit approval of the German government
7. A Irlanda e a Liga Agrária, "Ireland and the Land League": growing resistance, led by Parnell, to oppression in the Irish countryside
8. Lorde Beaconsfield, "Lord Beaconsfield": the death of the statesman and author in 1881, his remarkable life story, his fantastic and unreadable fiction (e.g. Tancred) and poetry (The Revolutionary Epick)
9. Os ingleses no Egipto, "The English in Egypt": the destruction and occupation of Alexandria by British forces in 1882 and the danger of Jihad. See quotation below
10. O Brasil e Portugal, "Brazil and Portugal": reflections on a special article on Brazil in The Times
11. A festa das crianças, "The children's party": an elaborate fancy dress party somewhere near Tintagel
12. Uma partida feita ao Times, "A practical joke at The Times": a few lines of erotic text interpolated, by an unknown hand, into the report of a speech by Sir William Harcourt

== Eça de Queiroz and the English ==
Eça, a cosmopolitan widely read in English literature, had no admiration for English society or the British Empire, though he was fascinated by them. This bitter sketch of the British in their Empire comes from the six-article series Os ingleses no Egipto, "The English in Egypt":

What a strange people! For them it is a matter of certainty that no one can be moral without reading the Bible; no one can be strong without playing cricket; no one can be a gentleman without being English. And this is what makes them hated. They never blend; they never become un-English ... The Englishman falls on foreign ideas and customs as a block of granite falls on water. There he stays, with his Bible, his clubs, his sports, his prejudices, his etiquette, his self-centredness ... Even in countries where he has lived for hundreds of years, he is still the foreigner.

Eça de Queiroz, Cartas de Inglaterra
