= Contos (Eça de Queiroz) =

Collection of short stories by the Portuguese writer José Maria de Eça de Queirós

- Author: Eça de Queiroz
- Language: Portuguese
- Publication date: 1902

Contos is a collection of short stories by the Portuguese writer Eça de Queiroz. It was first published in 1902, two years after his death.

== Story titles ==
- Singularidades de uma rapariga loura (The Idiosyncracies of a Young Blonde Woman). Published in English in The Mandarin and other stories
- Um poeta lírico (A Lyric Poet). Published in English in Alves & Co. and other stories
- No moinho (The Mill). Published in English in Alves & Co. and other stories
- Civilização (Civilization)
- O tesouro (The Treasure). Published in English in Alves & Co. and other stories
- Frei Genebro (Friar Genebro). Published in English in Alves & Co. and other stories
- Adão e Eva no Paraíso (Adam and Eve in Paradise). Published in English as Adam and Eve in Paradise.
- A aia (The Nurse). Published in English in Alves & Co. and other stories
- O defunto (The Hanged Man: literally, The Defunct One). Published in English as The Mandarin and other stories
- José Matias. Published in English in The Mandarin and other stories
- A perfeição (The Perfection)
- O suave milagre (The Sweet Miracle). Published in English in Alves & Co. and other stories

Singularidades de uma rapariga Loura (Peculiarities of a Fair-haired Gir) was adapted to cinema by Portuguese filmmaker Manoel de Oliveira in 2009. See Eccentricities of a Blonde-haired Girl.
