= Alice de Sousa =

British actress

Alice de Sousa is a London-based British film and theatre producer, actress, screenwriter, and playwright.

In 2014, she executive produced Terence Davies' feature film Sunset Song. She is the British representative of the Iris Group and the managing director of Iris Productions UK Ltd.

== Career ==
=== Acting ===
De Sousa has played leading roles in thirty stage plays including the title roles in two different productions of 'The Duchess of Malfi' (John Webster), Hedda in two separate productions of 'Hedda Gabler' (Henrik Ibsen), and Celestina in 'Celestina' (de Rojas; Lady Macbeth in 'Macbeth' (William Shakespeare); Anne Boleyn in 'Anne of the Thousand Days'; Millamant in 'The Way of the World' (William Congreve); Goneril in 'King Lear' (William Shakespeare); Hermione in 'The Winter's Tale' (William Shakespeare); Maria Eduarda in two different productions of her own translation/adaption of Eça de Queirós' masterpiece novel 'The Maias'); Ophelia in 'Hamlet' (William Shakespeare); Marina in 'Pericles' (William Shakespeare); Elvira in 'Blithe Spirit' (Noël Coward); Dona Madalena in 'The Pilgrim' (Almeida Garrett); Juliet in 'Romeo and Juliet' (William Shakespeare); and Joana in the World Première of her translation of Bernardo Santareno's play 'The Crime of the Old Village' (O Crime de Aldeia Velha).

=== Theatrical productions ===
De Sousa has created over seventy professional theatre shows, including:'Anne of a Thousand Days' and 'Pericles' (1991/2); the 1999 Open-air Shakespearean Festival in Eltham Greenwich; the 2000 British Première of 'Never Nothing From No One' (Luisa Costa Gomes). Thereafter, for Galleon Theatre Company and at her own London theatre venue the Greenwich Playhouse (AKA The Prince Theatre) she produced 'Hamlet'; 'Company' (and its transfer to the Palace Theatre); 'Pygmalion'; 'Richard III'; 'You're Gonna Love Tomorrow'; 'Peep Show'; two different productions of 'Hedda Gabler' in which she also played the title role; 'The Crime of Father Amaro'; 'Cousin Basílio' which she adapted for the stage; 'Shadows on the Sun' Barrie Keffee's first stage play in a decade; 'The Importance of Being Earnest'; '3 Sisters'; 'The White Devil'; ‘Tis Pity She’s a Whore'; 'The Ruffian on the Stair' & 'The Erpingham Camp'; 'The Maias' which she adapted for the stage and played Maria Eduarda; her original play 'Inês de Castro'; played Goneril and produced 'King Lear'; 'Absent Friends'; 'A Doll’s House'; 'The Seagull'; translated/adapted/produced and played Madalena in 'The Heiress of the Cane Fields'; translated, produced and played Joana in 'The Crime of the Old Village'; translated/adapted/produced and played Matilde in 'Thankfully there is Moonlight!'; produced and played Hedda Gabler in 'Hedda Gabler'; produced two different productions of 'The Merchant of Venice'; wrote and produced the internationally acclaimed, award winning 'Aristides – the Outcast Hero'; in 2010 produced 'The Importance of Being Earnest', and a second production of 'The Cherry Orchard'; in 2011 produced 'A Woman of No Importance', and a second production of her own adaptation of 'The Maias', again playing Maria Eduarda; in 2012 produced for the second time 'Hamlet', and 'The Duchess of Malfi' in which she returned to the title role. This was the last production to be staged at the Greenwich Playhouse, a London leading, independent, studio theatre venue which she had artistically directed since 1995.

=== Film ===
In 2004, de Sousa co-founded 'Galleon Films Ltd.' for which they are developing four feature films: 'The Duchess of Malfi'; 'The Angel of Bordeaux'; 'Inês de Castro'; and ‘Lady Bare Knuckles’. In 1989 she founded Galleon Theatre Company Ltd. In December 1995, she founded The Prince Theatre (AKA Greenwich Playhouse Ltd.) where she staged thirty-eight in-house theatre productions until the venue closed in September 1998. In May 2000, following the successful outcome of a campaign to save the studio from closure, they re-opened the venue and renamed it Greenwich Playhouse.

=== Writing ===
De Sousa has written original stage scripts entitled ‘Inês de Castro’ and ‘Aristides: the Outcast Hero'; and theatre translations/adaptations of Eça de Queirós’ novels ‘Cousin Basilio’ and ‘The Maias’; Almeida Garrett's ‘The Pilgrim’ (Frei Luis de Sousa); Luis Sttau Monteiro's ‘Thankfully there is Moonlight!’ (Felizmente há Luar!); Bernardo Santareno's 'The Crime of the Old Village' (O Crime de Aldeia Velha); and Julio Dinis’ 'The Heiress of the Cane Fields' (Morgadinha dos Canaviais).

As a screenwriter, she has written original film scripts of ‘Inês de Castro’; ‘The Angel of Bordeaux’ (AKA – Aristides: the Outcast Hero; her own filmic adaptation of John Webster's ‘The Duchess of Malfi’; and is writing ‘Lady Bare Knuckles’.

== Awards ==
In 2001 and 2005 de Sousa won the Arts Council Playwright's Bursary.
