= Saint Christopher (novella) =

1912 (posthumous) novel by José Maria de Eça de Queirós

Saint Cristopher
- Cover of the 2015 English-language version
- Author: José Maria de Eça de Queirós
- Original title: São Cristóvão
- Translator: Gregory Rabassa and Earl E. Fritz
- Cover artist: Titian, 1523
- Language: Portuguese
- Series: Adamastor Series 9
- Publisher: Tagus Press at UMass Dartmouth
- Publication date: 1912 (in the volume Últimas Páginas)
- Publication place: Portugal
- English publication date: 2015, Tagus
- Pages: 140
- ISBN: 9781933227627

Saint Christopher (Portuguese: São Cristóvão) is a novella by José Maria de Eça de Queirós (1845 - 1900), also known as Eça de Queiroz, that draws on the legend of Saint Christopher. Written in the 1890s, it was first published posthumously in Portuguese in 1912. The first English version, translated by Gregory Rabassa and Earl E. Fritz, was published by Tagus Press in 2015.

== Background ==
Although not strictly speaking a hagiography of Saint Christopher, the novella does draw on the legend of the saint, providing a fictional version described by one scholar as a “hagiofantasy”. As with several other works by Eça, there is no extant original manuscript and it is unclear how final the published version was intended to be. It was originally published in Portuguese twelve years after Eça's death, as part of a volume called Últimas Páginas (Last Pages), which included two other stories inspired by the lives of saints, Saint Onuphrius and Saint Giles of Santarém. Despite the fact that he draws on the legends of saints for these stories, other novels by Eça reveal a fairly ambivalent approach to the Catholic Church, with The Crime of Father Amaro being openly critical of the clergy and The Relic poking fun at the excessive religiosity of late 19th Century Portugal.

== The story ==
The Christopher of Eça's novella lives in the Middle Ages. Son of poor parents and physically unattractive he grows rapidly to become a giant. Following the death of his parents he finds himself in various situations in which he can put his strength to altruistic purposes. Initially he helps people in his parents’ town with their daily chores and becomes very popular, but at the insistence of the Church the people turn against him and he is driven out, being blamed for a storm that damages the buildings and destroys the crops. After wandering the country he arrives at a castle that has been afflicted by the plague. He helps by burying the dead and carrying food and firewood but is eventually captured by the Count, who is jealous of the affection of the people for him. Christopher manages to break free and after further travels through the countryside comes across a group of religious hermits. The Friar persuades him to help with the hermits’ daily chores, to give them more time for their religious activities, but Christopher eventually leaves finding their obsession with paying penances, including self-flagellation, to be ridiculous.

Christopher then travels through an area laid destitute by battles between feudal lords. Those peasants who have not been killed are starving. This leads him to question his religious beliefs, not understanding why God fails to intervene to put an end to the suffering. He next arrives at a feudal castle where he becomes the plaything of the Lord of the Manor, a young boy, carrying the boy everywhere on his shoulders. Eventually rejected by the growing boy he then becomes involved with and eventually leader of a peasant revolt with similarities to the Jacquerie revolt in 14th Century France. When the rebels were eventually defeated he comes close to death but receives a visitation from an angel and recovers to again wander the countryside, helping people wherever he can.

After a period being exhibited as a freak show in a country fair, Christopher continues his travels. He comes across a group of travellers unable to cross a river because of the destruction of the bridge and, as in the legend of Saint Christopher, carries them, their possessions and animals across the river. He decides to settle by the river so that he can continue to provide this service. Eventually he becomes old and exhausted and the final scene has him rising up to Heaven in the company of the baby Jesus Christ.

== Significance ==
Ana Siqueira suggests that Eça's story proposes a model of altruism in opposition to the moral bankruptcy and cultural stagnation of 19th-century Portugal, a common theme in Eça's novels. She argues that the novella aims to direct Portuguese Catholics to social justice and not just spiritual salvation. In an introduction to the book, Carlos Reis considers that the novella strongly represents the values of Eça himself, those of a passion for social justice and human solidarity that are nearly always reflected in his other works. Luiz Piva notes that in other writings by Eça he makes frequent references to Saint Francis of Assisi.
