= O Crime do Padre Amaro =

Novel by the Portuguese writer José Maria de Eça de Queiroz

The Crime of Father Amaro
- Cover of the Dedalus European Classics 2018 version. Cover illustrates "The Ambassador of Jesus" by Paula Rego
- Author: José Maria de Eça de Queiroz
- Original title: O Crime do Padre Amaro
- Translator: Nan Flanagan, Margaret Jull Costa
- Language: Portuguese
- Publisher: Typografia Castro Irmão
- Publication date: 1875
- Publication place: Portugal
- English publication date: 1962, 2003, 2018
- ISBN: 978-0-85051-508-4 (Portuguese); ISBN 978-0-552-99134-6 (Flanagan translation); ISBN 978-0-8112-1532-9 (Costa translation)
- OCLC: 76891987

O Crime do Padre Amaro: cenas da vida devota (published in translations as The Crime of Father Amaro: Scenes from the Religious Life or The Sin of Father Amaro), is a novel by the 19th-century Portuguese writer José Maria de Eça de Queiroz. It was first published in 1875 to great controversy.

== Background ==
Eça finished the first draft of this novel in 1875. He sent it to some friends who ran a literary magazine, with the request that they return the proofs so he could edit them. However, they began to serialise the story without allowing him to see the proofs. He subsequently revised the novel and submitted it to a publisher in 1876 but it was barely noticed by the public. Eça then wrote Cousin Bazilio, returning to The Crime of Father Amaro only after the publication of Cousin Bazilio in 1878. The third version involved an extensive rewrite and was described by Eça as "an entirely new novel".

== Plot summary ==
The novel concerns a young priest, Amaro, who serves as diocesan administrator at Leiria. Amaro lacks a vocation, having been pushed into the priesthood by his aristocratic patrons, the Marquesa de Alegros and, later, the Conde de Ribamar, and, owing to the vow of chastity he was obliged to take, is obsessed with women and deeply sexually frustrated.

Upon arriving in Leiria, he falls for Amélia, the beautiful daughter of his landlady, a pious widow and the mistress of his superior, Canon Dias. After Amélia's fiancé, João Eduardo, publishes an exposé of the local clergy's venal habits in the town's newspaper under a pseudonym, Amaro and his colleagues and parishioners expose João Eduardo as the author of the piece, pressure Amélia to break off the engagement, and drive João Eduardo out of town.

Amaro begins a sexual relationship with Amélia, meeting first in his coal cellar and then in the bell-ringer's house, using charitable visits to his bedridden, mentally disabled daughter as a cover. His love affair with Amélia ends in tragedy when she becomes pregnant and is forced to seclude herself in the countryside for the duration of the pregnancy to prevent a scandal.

João Eduardo returns to Leiria, and there is talk of convincing him to marry Amélia and hence make the child legitimate, but this does not come to pass. Amaro and his maid, Dionisia, who also acts as a midwife, find a wet-nurse who, it is implied, kills babies in her care. Amélia gives birth to a healthy boy, who is handed over to the wet-nurse by Amaro and killed. Amélia suffers complications after the birth and dies of a burst aneurysm, or so the doctor tells everyone. She was in good health immediately after the birth, but became hysterical when she was not allowed to see her son. The actual paternity of Amélia's child, while the subject of gossip, never comes to light, and Amaro moves on to another parish. The novel leaves him in Lisbon, discussing the events of the Paris Commune.

== Characters ==
- Father Amaro – Amaro was born in Lisbon to parents who worked as domestic servants for the marquise of Alegros. After being orphaned at the age of six, he was adopted by the marquise, who decided to educate him at home. He became lazy and womanish thereafter. When Amaro was 13 years old, the marquise died, and he was sent to the seminary although he didn't have a vocation. After arriving in Leiria, where he managed to get a placement, he became involved in a romantic relationship with Amélia, the daughter of Senhora Joanneira with whom he is living, and the two embark on a passionate love affair.
- Amélia – Daughter of Joanneira, she didn't know her father and was educated in a very religious environment, because her mother received a lot of visits by 'beatas', exceedingly devout members of the Church. She is betrothed to João Eduardo, a left-wing clerk, but she falls in love with Father Amaro, becomes pregnant by him, and ultimately dies following the delivery when her child is taken from her.
- João Eduardo – A clerk at a notary's office, he is the fiancé of Amélia, hates the clergy, and only goes to the church to impress Amélia and her mother. When he discovers that Amélia and Amaro are flirting, he publishes a letter in a newspaper, A Voz do Distrito (The District's Voice), revealing their involvement as well as the other sins of the clergy. When the people of Leiria find out that João Eduardo was the one who wrote the letter, he loses his job, is excommunicated, and Amélia breaks off the wedding under Amaro's instruction.
- Joaneira – She is a fat, tall woman. The mother of Amélia, after becoming widowed, she started being visited by a lot of members of the clergy and became the lover of Canon Dias who frequently dines there and gives her money towards housekeeping.
- Canon Dias – He was Father Amaro's religious teacher during the seminary, is the lover of Joanneira, and also the owner of a large number of rented properties.
- Abbot Ferrão – The only likable priest in the whole story, who represents a new form of Christian love and whose voice is said to be synonymous with that of Eça. He comforts Amélia while she is pregnant and opens the way to her redemption, although Amaro's power over her proves to be too great. He is fond of hunting.
- Doctor Gouveia – The family doctor, a liberal.
- Dionisia – A procuress and midwife who helps Father Amaro arrange the affair.
- Father Natário – A dogmatic priest who finds out that João Eduardo is responsible for the infamous article. He is rumored to have had an affair with his two nieces.
- Father Brito – A priest who is removed to a distant mountain parish after the article makes his affair with a noble lady known.
- Uncle Esguelhas – The church bell-ringer. In his house, Father Amaro and Amélia can secretly meet under the guise of teaching his invalid daughter, Totó, to read.
- Doctor Godinho – A prominent liberal lawyer in Leiria.

== Reviews ==
Writing in the Washington Post, Michael Dirda describes O Crime do Padre Amaro as a "terrific novel". Noting that the work is often compared with Émile Zola's La Faute de l'Abbé Mouret, Dirda argues that "Eça's relentless and unforgiving satire is far more sweeping than Zola's often soft-focused pastoral". He adds that the novel employs every sort of comedy and that Eça is a writer "who understands sex".

== Translations ==
- Dutch author J. Slauerhoff translated the work into Dutch in 1932 under the title De misdaad van pater Amaro.
- An English translation by Nan Flanagan appeared in 1962 under the title The Sin of Father Amaro. The novel has also been translated by Margaret Jull Costa as The Crime of Father Amaro, published in 2003 by Dedalus Books (UK) and New Directions (US).
- Czech translator Z. Hampejs translated the work into Czech in 1961 under the title Zločin pátera Amara.

== Film and TV adaptations ==
Zločin pátera Amara, a Czechoslovak movie from 1968 is an adaptation of the novel. Jaroslav Dudek directed the movie.

In 2002, Carlos Carrera directed a Spanish-language version of O Crime do Padre Amaro (El crimen del padre Amaro) in Mexico. It starred Gael García Bernal as Father Amaro and was greeted with public outrage in Mexico, where Christian groups called for it to be banned. In 2002, it was one of the Best Foreign Language Film Nominees at the 75th Academy Awards. The film was criticized in Portugal as insufficiently faithful to the novel. It was said that Mexico in 2002 has little or nothing to do with the 19th century context in the novel; in addition, Amaro's motivation is different. In the novel his education steers him into the priesthood, whereas in the film he chooses to follow this path himself and has some anticlerical views. Finally, Eça's Amélia is older (aged 23) than her film equivalent, although the actress who played the part (Ana Claudia Talancón) turned 22 in the year the film was released.

In 2005, Carlos Coelho da Silva directed the movie O Crime do Padre Amaro in Portugal. This was a production sponsored by the SIC television channel. Padre Amaro (Jorge Corrula) and Amélia (Soraia Chaves) were the main characters. According to the IMDb, this was (as of January 2006) the most successful Portuguese movie in Portuguese box office history.

In 2023, Leonel Vieira directed a Portuguese TV miniseries based on O Crime do Padre Amaro for RTP, starring José Condessa as Padre Amaro and Bárbara Branco as Amélia. This adaptation was the first to portray the same time period as the novel.
