= The City and the Mountains =

Novel by José Maria de Eça de Queirós

- Cover of the 2018 English-language version published by Dedalus
- Author: José Maria de Eça de Queirós
- Original title: A Cidade e as Serras
- Translator: Margaret Jull Costa
- Cover artist: Marie Lane/Carlos Botelho
- Language: Portuguese
- Series: Dedalus European Classics
- Genre: Satire
- Publisher: Dedalus
- Publication date: 1901
- Publication place: Portugal
- English publication date: 1967 (Ohio University Press); 2008 (Dedalus)
- Pages: 237
- ISBN: 9781903517710

The City and the Mountains (Portuguese: A Cidade e as Serras) is a satirical novel comparing the emptiness of upper-class life in Paris with the pleasures found in rural Portugal. It was written in 1895 by José Maria de Eça de Queirós (1845–1900), also known as Eça de Queiroz, when he was living in Paris. The novel was published posthumously in Portuguese in 1901 with a final edit and an ending contributed by his friend, Ramalho Ortigão. The first English version, translated by Roy Campbell, was published by the Ohio University Press in 1967. A new translation by Margaret Jull Costa was published by Dedalus Books in 2008, and republished in 2018.

== Background ==
The story reflects the author's own experiences. For many years he had angled to get the post of Portuguese consul in Paris but, once there, he found the city "very coarse as regards manners and ideas, and it's completely black! In 1892 he had inherited an estate in the Douro valley of Portugal, which he found to be very beautiful, while noting the poverty of the inhabitants."

== Plot ==
Jacinto is well-educated and rich, and mixes with the cream of Parisian society. He lives in an apartment on the Champs-Élysées in Paris in which he has installed the latest technology, much of which has a tendency to go wrong. He has 30,000 books and knows of all the latest ideas on the secrets of happiness, but is not happy. When Zé Fernandes, a long-time friend and the narrator of the story, visits him after an absence of seven years, Jacinto is starting to find Parisian society boring. His formula for a good life has “contorted itself into a debilitating kind of retail therapy”.

Jacinto finally decides to visit his country estate in Portugal after a landslide occurs that destroys the 16th-century chapel where the remains of his ancestors were housed. However, he cannot travel there without first boxing up many of his Parisian possessions and sending them to the estate. But fate intervenes amusingly during the journey and Zé and Jacinto arrive there with no possessions. Jacinto enjoys rural living and becomes involved in the management of his estates. He is appalled by the rural poverty, including that experienced by his tenants, and tries to do something about it by improving housing and handing out money. He eventually marries Zé's cousin, Joaninha, and together they have two children. Half-hearted suggestions that they should visit Paris are conveniently forgotten and Jacinto becomes “well and truly settled”.

== Reviews ==
A reviewer in the UK's The Independent considered the novel to be "a smart balance of satire, irony and lyric grace – the progress of a rich brat who quits the city to find fulfilment in rural life". Another review felt that the novel offered a "wry take on fin-de-siècle life as experienced by two secular, well-heeled young men in the bustle of Paris and in the quietude of the Portuguese countryside". However, the same reviewer argued that the book was not particularly profound and was basically a second-string work by a major author. This was due not to the quality of the prose, but to the reliance upon the most easily caricatured subjects, unlike the novelist's other books.

Several reviewers comment adversely on the end of the book, written by Eça's friend, Ramalho Ortigão, which is seen as being too flowery, predictable and sentimental for the satirical tone of the novel.
