= Eça de Queiroz =

Portuguese realist writer (1845–1900)

Eça de Queirós
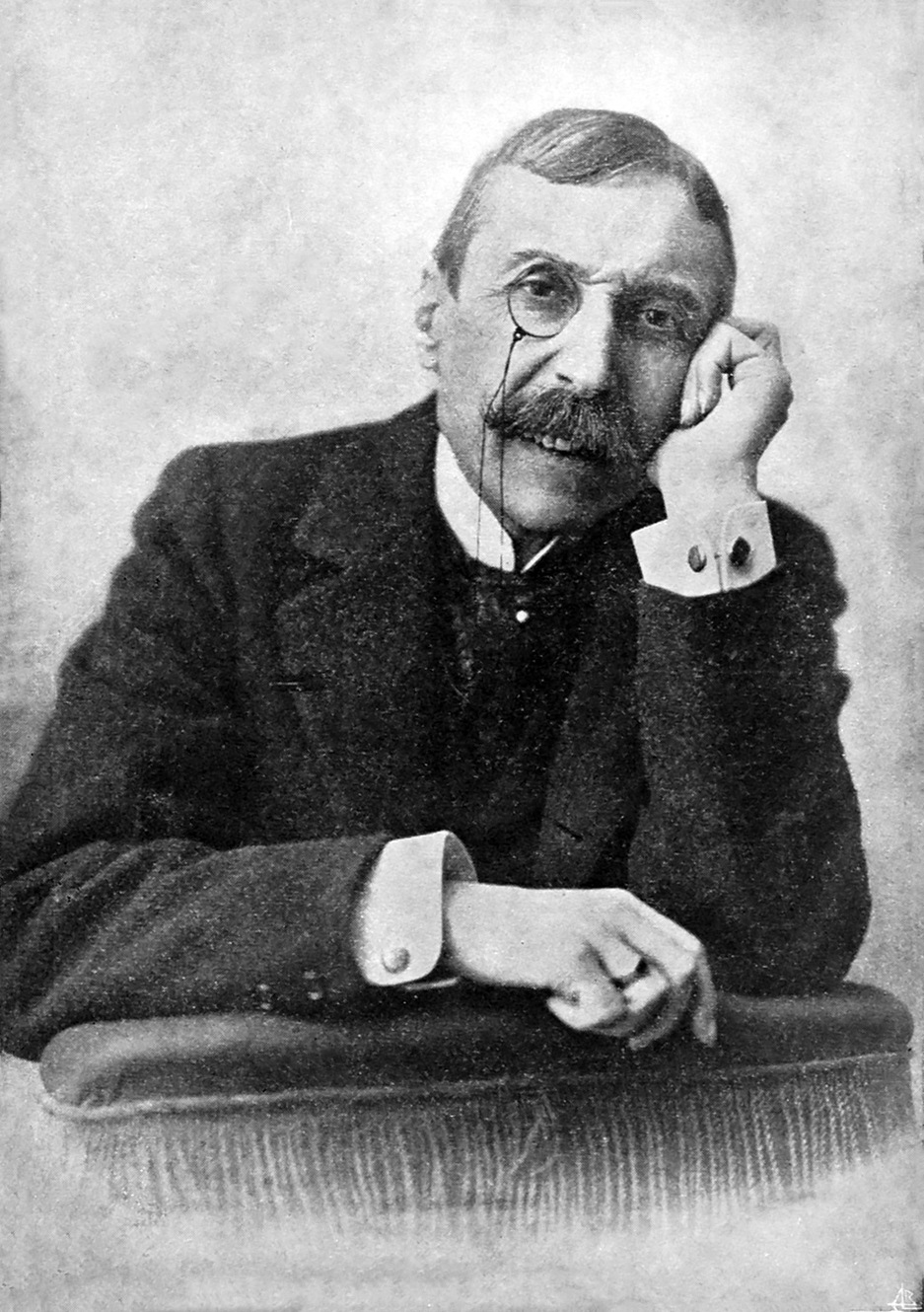
- Born: José Maria de Eça de Queirós; 25 November 1845; Póvoa de Varzim, Portugal
- Died: 16 August 1900 (aged 54); Neuilly-sur-Seine, France
- Occupations: Novelist, consul, journalist
- Writing career
- Movements: Realism, Romanticism

Signature
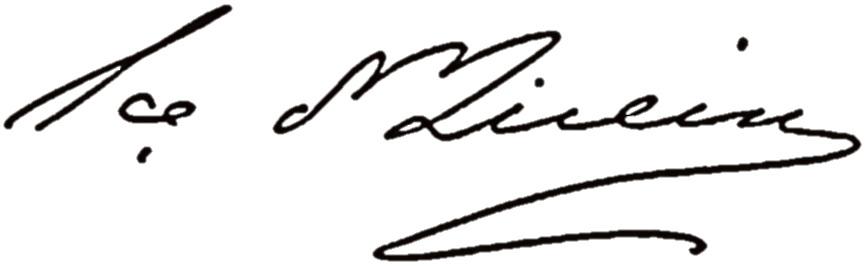

José Maria de Eça de Queiroz or Queirós (European Portuguese: [ˈɛsɐ ðɨ kɐjˈɾɔʃ]; 25 November 1845 – 16 August 1900) was a Portuguese author, journalist and diplomat.

Born in northern Portugal, he earned a law degree from the University of Coimbra before being appointed a local administrative official in Leiria, the town that would later serve as the setting of his breakthrough novel in the realist style, The Crime of Father Amaro. He then embarked on a diplomatic career as Portuguese consul in Havana, Newcastle upon Tyne, Bristol and Paris, where he died in 1900, aged 54.

The beginnings of his literary career are inextricably linked to his role as a leading member of the Generation of '70, alongside such figures as Antero de Quental and Oliveira Martins, a group of young radical intellectuals committed to artistic reform who denounced late Portuguese Romanticism as outmoded and intellectually barren. Eça's works, modelled on French Realism and Zola's scientifically minded naturalist school, chronicle his country's cultural decline and ennui during the last decades of the Portuguese monarchy. They are often satirical in tone, inasmuch as they are set against the backdrop of, and wryly interrogate, the bourgeois social mores, hypocrisies and institutions of late-19th-century Portugal. As in much of realist literature, adultery and sexuality are recurring themes. They also frequently contain an anticlerical streak, lampooning what he and his fellow members of the Generation of '70 believed to be the Catholic Church's deleterious influence on Portuguese society in fostering cultural stagnation and complacency, and helping preserve a conservative social order.

Eça de Queiroz is generally considered the greatest Portuguese writer in the realist style, and regarded across the Portuguese-speaking world as one of its literary greats. Zola considered him greater than Flaubert himself. In the London Observer, Jonathan Keates ranked him alongside Dickens, Balzac and Tolstoy.

== Biography ==
Eça was born in Póvoa de Varzim, then a fishing town, some 18 miles north of Porto, on 25 November 1845.

Eça was born out of wedlock. He was the child of José Maria de Almeida Teixeira de Queiroz, a prominent magistrate, born in Rio de Janeiro to Portuguese parents in 1820, and Carolina Augusta Pereira d'Eça, aged nineteen and six years José Maria's junior. Both were unmarried at the time of Eça's birth, and Carolina's mother objected to their relationship. Fearing scandal, Carolina absented herself from the family home temporarily to give birth away from prying eyes. The first of seven siblings, the child was baptised on 1 December 1845 in the main church of nearby Vila do Conde rather than at Póvoa. Neither parent was in attendance. He was christened as the son of an unknown mother and legitimised only after his parents were able to wed following his grandmother's death, when he was four years old. Through his parents he was a relative of several famous Portuguese authors, including Alexandre O'Neill, Fernando Pessoa and Júlio Dantas, and the Portuguese footballer João Neves. He is also the great-great-grandfather of contemporary Portuguese author Afonso Reis Cabral.

Eça was raised chiefly by his godmother, a Brazilian seamstress named Ana Joaquina Leal de Barros, born in Pernambuco, who died when he was five, and by his paternal grandparents. He would continue to live with them up to the age of ten, whereupon he was admitted to the Colégio da Irmandade da Lapa, a boarding school in Porto. There he studied under Ramalho Ortigão, who taught French and whose father was the headmaster. Nine years Eça's senior, Ortigão would become a lifelong close friend and his literary collaborator. O Mistério da Estrada de Sintra, or The Mystery of the Sintra Road (1870), co-authored with Ortigão, would be Eça's first completed novel. Published in instalments when he was 24, it was famously conceived as a literary hoax in the form of a series of letters addressed to a newspaper's editor, who was privy to the joke. The letters were all written over the course of two months, ostensibly by individuals implicated in an extraordinary kidnapping, and caused something of a sensation in Lisbon. Later in life, Eça questioned the novel's literary merits, having come to regard it as flawed and juvenile. He and Ortigão would continue to collaborate, working together on a monthly publication of critical journalism, "As Farpas", until Eça's departure for Havana in 1872.

While enrolled at Lapa, Eça would spend his summers at his paternal grandmother's house in Verdemilho, Aveiro, where a roundabout, featuring his likeness at its centre, also bears his name to honour the fact. Thereafter, at age 16, he began studying law at Coimbra, where he met and befriended the Azorean poet Antero de Quental. Eça's first work consisted of a series of prose poems published in the Gazeta de Portugal, which would eventually debut in book form in a posthumous collection edited by Batalha Reis, titled Prosas Bárbaras ("Barbarous texts"). He worked as a journalist at Évora, then returned to Lisbon and, together with Ortigão and others, conceived and created the Correspondence of the fictional Fradique Mendes. The work was first published in 1900.

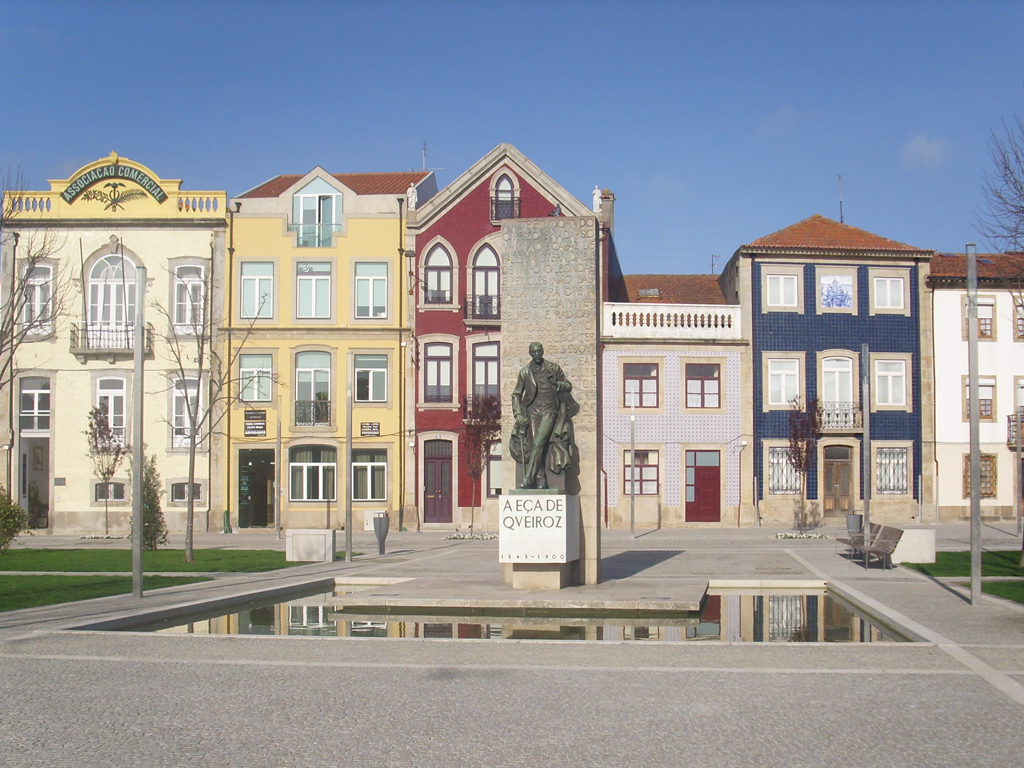
Statue of Eça in Póvoa de Varzim; a short distance from his birthplace

Between 1869 and 1870, Eça travelled to Egypt to witness the grand opening of the Suez Canal. The voyage inspired several of his works, most notably the aforementioned The Mystery of the Sintra Road. He also authored A Relíquia ("The Relic") during this period, though it would be published only in 1887. The work was strongly influenced by Memorie di Giuda ("Memoirs of Judas") by Ferdinando Petruccelli della Gattina, to such an extent that the perceived similarities led some scholars to accuse the Portuguese writer of plagiarism.

Having been dispatched to Leiria to work as a municipal administrator, Eça wrote his first realist novel, O Crime do Padre Amaro ("The Crime of Father Amaro"), set in the same city, and first published in 1875. He would eventually rewrite the novel and produce three different versions thereof.

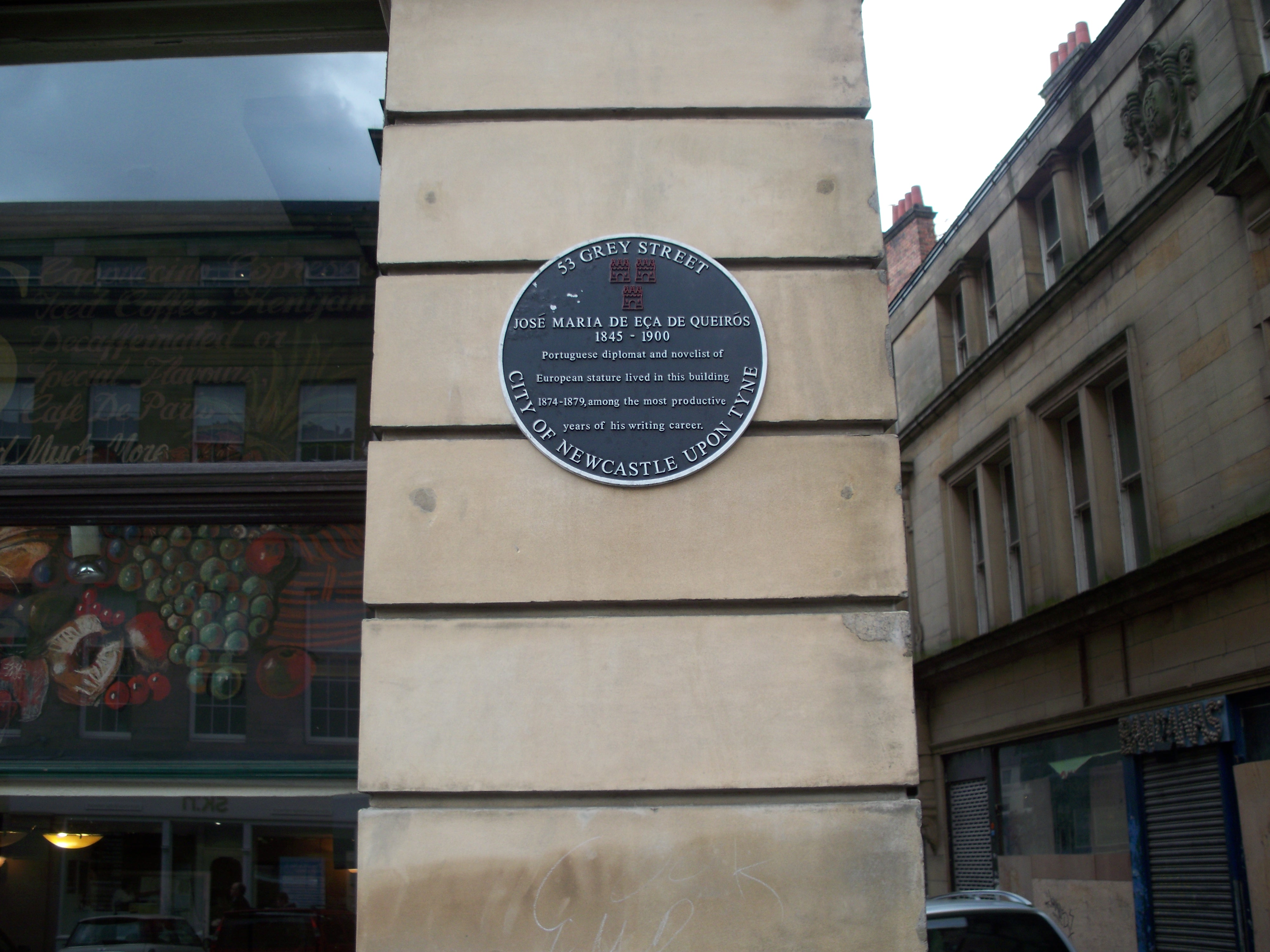
Plaque in Grey Street, Newcastle

Eça then worked in the Portuguese consular service and after two years' service at Havana was stationed, from late 1874 until April 1879, at 53 Grey Street, Newcastle upon Tyne, where there is a memorial plaque in his honour. His diplomatic duties included the dispatch of detailed reports to the Portuguese foreign office concerning the unrest in the Northumberland and Durham coalfields – in which, as he points out, the miners earned twice as much as those in South Wales, along with free housing and a weekly supply of coal. The Newcastle years were among the most productive of his literary career. He published the second version of O Crime de Padre Amaro in 1876 and another celebrated novel, O Primo Basílio ("Cousin Bazilio") in 1878, as well as working on some other projects. These included the first of his "Cartas de Londres" ("Letters from London") which were printed in the Lisbon daily newspaper Diário de Notícias and afterwards appeared in book form as Cartas de Inglaterra.

As early as 1878, he had at least conceived a title for his masterpiece Os Maias ("The Maias"), though it was largely written while he was Portuguese consul in Bristol from 1879 to 1888. It was published the year he left Bristol to become the Portuguese consul-general in Paris. In February 1886, he had married Maria Emília de Castro in Lisbon, who joined him at his residence in 38 Stoke Hill, Stoke Bishop, near Bristol where there is also a memorial plaque. As Maria Emília felt unhappy during her stay at Stoke Hill, the couple agreed to relocate and rented a house in Notting Hill, London, likely a satisfactory arrangement for both as his earlier letters indicate that he had already made frequent visits to London. Thereafter, Eça commuted between London and Bristol, where his house in Stoke Bishop was equidistant between the outer docks at Avonmouth and inner docks in Bristol.

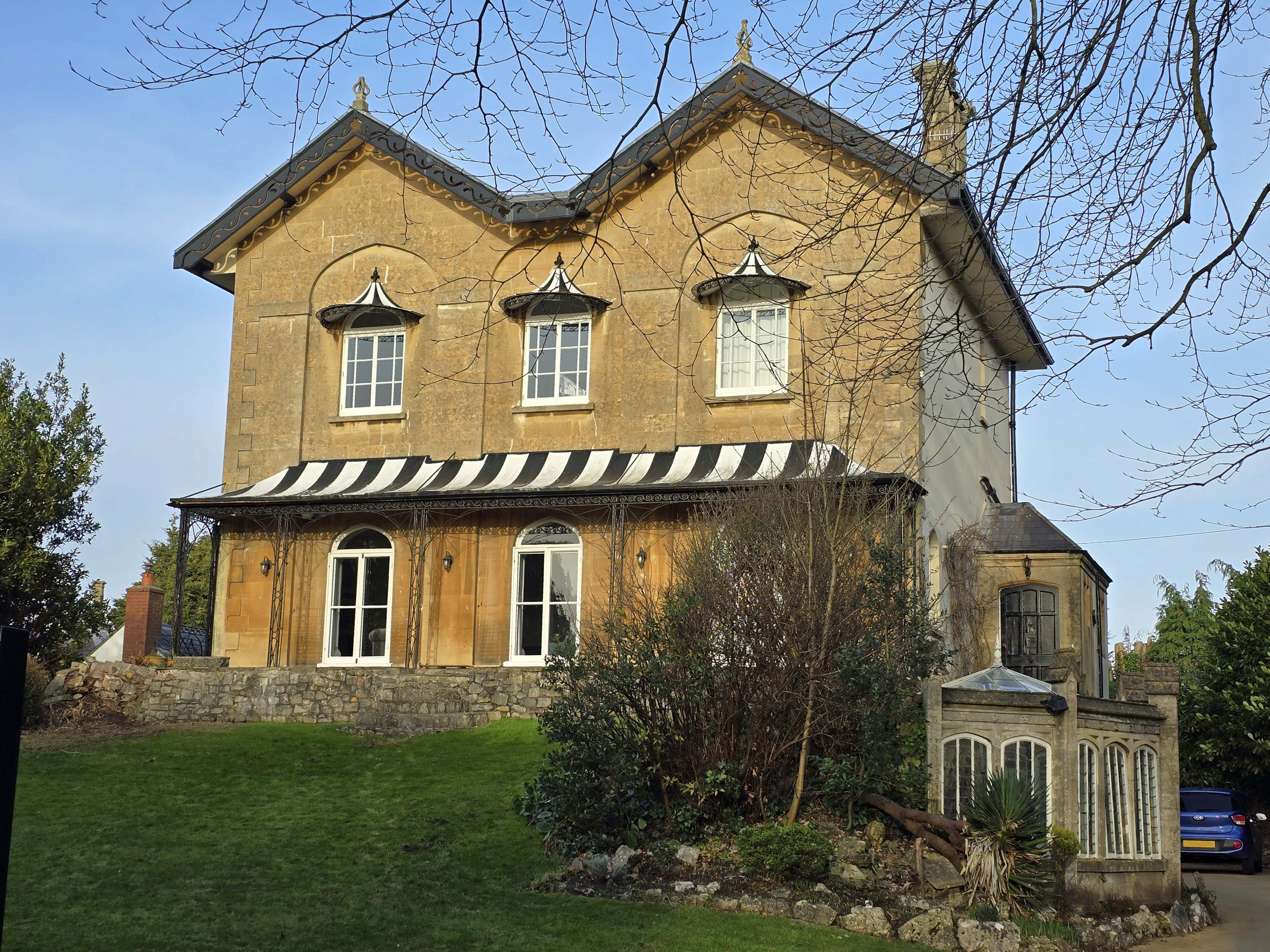
38 Stoke Hill. Eça de Queiroz's Bristol consulate.

Eça, a cosmopolitan widely read in English literature, was not enamoured of English society, but he was fascinated by its oddity. In Bristol he wrote: "Everything about this society is disagreeable to me – from its limited way of thinking to its indecent manner of cooking vegetables." As often happens when a writer is unhappy, the weather is endlessly bad. Nevertheless, he was rarely bored and was content to stay in England for some fifteen years. "I detest England, but this does not stop me from declaring that as a thinking nation, she is probably the foremost." It may be said that England acted as a constant stimulus and a corrective to Eça's traditionally Portuguese Francophilia.

Eça's politics were liberal, although he was also influenced by the ideas of Pierre-Joseph Proudhon. In 1898, upon growing more pessimistic about the future of Portugal and Europe, he described himself as a "vague, saddened anarchist". Together with Ortigão and others he formed an informal group of intellectuals known as Life's Vanquished.

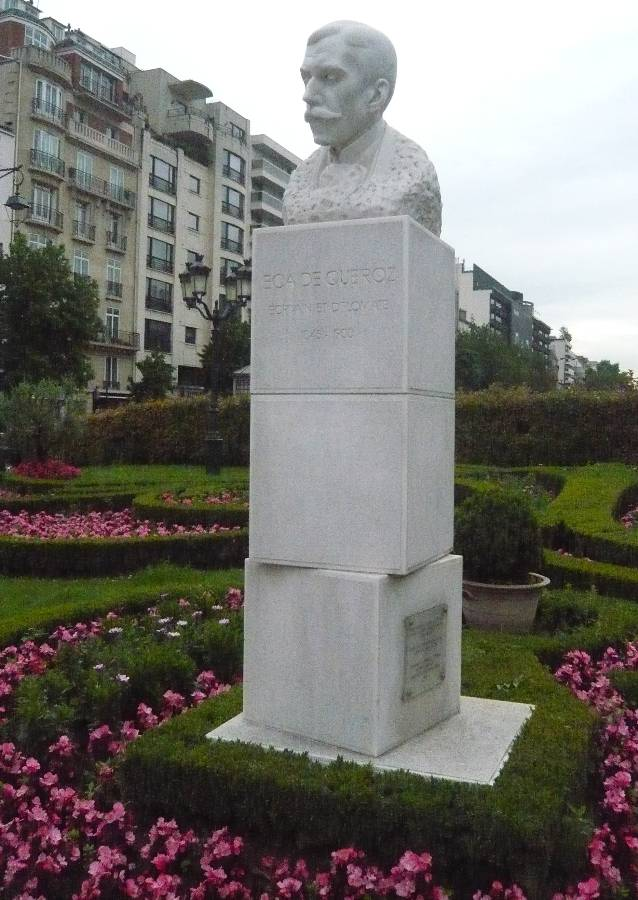
Bust of Eça de Queiroz in the Avenue Charles de Gaulle, Neuilly-sur-Seine

He had actively sought the position of Portuguese consul-general in Paris and, having obtained it in 1888, remained in post for the rest of his life. He lived at Neuilly-sur-Seine and continued to write journalism (Ecos de Paris, "Echoes from Paris") as well as literary criticism. He died in 1900 of either tuberculosis or, according to numerous contemporary physicians, Crohn's disease. His son António Eça de Queiroz would hold government office under António de Oliveira Salazar. He was first buried in a family vault in Alto de São João Cemetery, Lisbon and later exhumed and moved to a grave in Santa Cruz do Douro Cemetery, in Baião in the Porto District, where he had inherited an estate in 1892. His remains were transferred to the Church of Santa Engrácia (the National Pantheon) in Lisbon in January 2025.

== Works by Eça de Queiroz ==
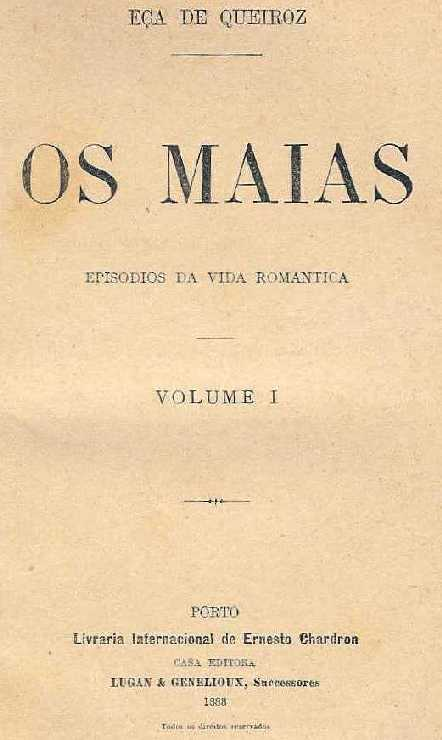
Cover of the first edition of Os Maias

- O Mistério da Estrada de Sintra ("The Mystery of the Sintra Road") 1870, in collaboration with Ramalho Ortigão
- O Crime do Padre Amaro ("The Crime of Father Amaro", 1875, revised 1876, revised 1880)
- O Primo Basílio ("Cousin Bazilio", 1878)
- O Mandarim (The Mandarin, 1880)
- As Minas de Salomão, translation of H. Rider Haggard's King Solomon's Mines (1885)
- A Relíquia 1887 ("The Relic", 1994)
- Os Maias ("The Maias", 1888)
- Uma Campanha Alegre ("A Cheerful Campaign") (1890–1891)
- Correspondência de Fradique Mendes ("Correspondence of Fradique Mendes"), 1890
- A Ilustre Casa de Ramires, 1900; ("The Illustrious House of Ramires", 2017)

Posthumous works

- A Cidade e as Serras ("The City and the Mountains") (1901, Posthumous)
- Contos ("Stories") (1902, Posthumous)
- Prosas Bárbaras ("Barbarous Texts", 1903, Posthumous)
- Cartas de Inglaterra ("Letters from England") (1905, Posthumous)
- Ecos de Paris ("Echos from Paris") (1905, Posthumous)
- Cartas Familiares e Bilhetes de Paris ("Family Letters and Notes from Paris") (1907, Posthumous)
- Notas Contemporâneas ("Contemporary Notes") (1909, Posthumous)
- São Cristóvão, published in English in 2015 as Saint Christopher. Originally published in Portuguese as part of the volume Últimas páginas ("Last Pages") (1912, Posthumous)
- A Capital ("To the Capital") (1925, Posthumous)
- O Conde d'Abranhos ("The Earl of Abranhos") (1925, Posthumous)
- Alves & C.a ("Alves & Co."). (1925, Posthumous) published in English as "The Yellow Sofa", and as "Alves & Co." in 2012 by Dedalus
- O Egipto ("Egypt", 1926, Posthumous)
- A Tragédia da Rua das Flores ("The Tragedy of the Street of Flowers") (1980, Posthumous)

== Periodicals to which Eça de Queiroz contributed ==
- Gazeta de Portugal
- As Farpas (The Barbs)
- Diário de Notícias

== Translations ==
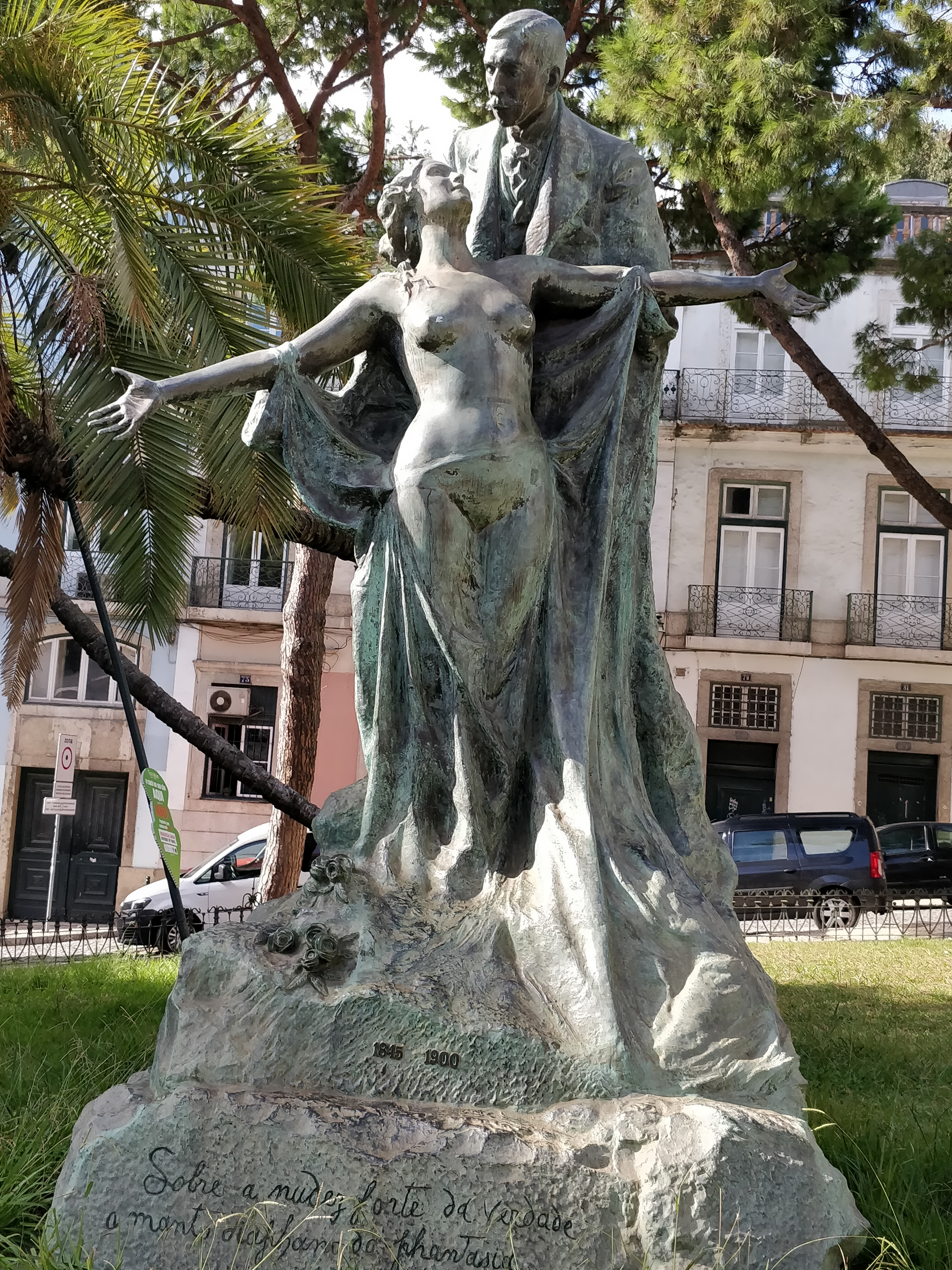
Statue of Eça de Queroz on Rua do Alecrim in Lisbon

The works of Eça have been translated into about 20 languages, including English. Since 2002 English versions of eight of his novels and two volumes of novellas and short stories, translated by Margaret Jull Costa, have been published in the UK by Dedalus Books.

- A capital (To the Capital): translation by John Vetch, Carcanet Press (UK), 1995.
- A Cidade e as serras (The City and the Mountains): translation by Roy Campbell, Ohio University Press, 1968.
- A Ilustre Casa de Ramires (The illustrious house of Ramires): translation by Ann Stevens, Ohio University Press, 1968; translation by Margaret Jull Costa, Dedalus Books, 2017
- A Relíquia (The Relic): translation by Aubrey F. Bell, A. A. Knopf, 1925. Also published as The Reliquary, Reinhardt, 1954.
- A Relíquia (The Relic): translation by Margaret Jull Costa, Dedalus Books, 1994.
- A tragédia da rua das Flores (The Tragedy of the Street of Flowers): translation by Margaret Jull Costa, Dedalus Books, 2000.
- Alves & Cia (Alves & Co.): translation by Robert M. Fedorchek, University Press of America, 1988.
- Cartas da Inglaterra (Letters from England): translation by Ann Stevens, Bodley Head, 1970. Also published as Eça's English Letters, Carcanet Press, 2000.
- O Crime do Padre Amaro (El crimen del Padre Amaro): Versión de Ramón del Valle – Inclan, Editorial Maucci, 1911
- O Crime do Padre Amaro (The Sin of Father Amaro): translation by Nan Flanagan, Bodley Head, 1962. Also published as The Crime of Father Amaro, Carcanet Press, 2002.
- O Crime do Padre Amaro (The Crime of Father Amaro): translation by Margaret Jull Costa, Dedalus Books, 2002.
- O Mandarim (The Mandarin in The Mandarin and Other Stories): translation by Richard Frank Goldman, Ohio University Press, 1965. Also published by Bodley Head, 1966; and Hippocrene Books, 1993.
- Um Poeta Lírico (A Lyric Poet in The Mandarin and Other Stories): translation by Richard Frank Goldman, Ohio University Press, 1965. Also published by Bodley Head, 1966; and Hippocrene Books, 1993.
- Singularidades de uma Rapariga Loura (Peculiarities of a Fair-haired Girl in The Mandarin and Other Stories): translation by Richard Frank Goldman, Ohio University Press, 1965. Also published by Bodley Head, 1966; and Hippocrene Books, 1993.
- José Mathias (José Mathias in The Mandarin and Other Stories): translation by Richard Frank Goldman, Ohio University Press, 1965. Also published by Bodley Head, 1966; and Hippocrene Books, 1993.
- O Mandarim (The Mandarin in The Mandarin and Other Stories): translation by Margaret Jull Costa, Hippocrene Books, 1983.
- O Mandarim (The Mandarin in The Mandarin and Other Stories): translation by Margaret Jull Costa, Dedalus Books, 2009.
- José Mathias (José Mathias in The Mandarin and Other Stories): translation by Margaret Jull Costa, Dedalus Books, 2009.
- O Defunto (The Hanged Man in The Mandarin and Other Stories): translation by Margaret Jull Costa, Dedalus Books, 2009.
- O Primo Basílio (Dragon's teeth): translation by Mary Jane Serrano, R. F. Fenno & Co., 1896.
- O Primo Basílio (Cousin Bazilio): translation by Roy Campbell, Noonday Press, 1953.
- O Primo Basílio (Cousin Bazilio): translation by Margaret Jull Costa, Dedalus Books, 2003.
- Suave milagre (The Sweet Miracle): translation by Edgar Prestage, David Nutt, 1905. Also published as The Fisher of Men, T. B. Mosher, 1905; The Sweetest Miracle, T. B. Mosher, 1906; The Sweet Miracle, B. H. Blakwell, 1914.
- Os Maias (The Maias): translation by Ann Stevens and Patricia McGowan Pinheiro, St. Martin's Press, 1965.
- Os Maias (The Maias): translation by Margaret Jull Costa, New Directions, 2007.
- O Defunto (Our Lady of the Pillar): translation by Edgar Prestage, Archibald Constable, 1906.
- Pacheco (Pacheco): translation by Edgar Prestage, Basil Blackwell, 1922.
- A Perfeição (Perfection): translation by Charles Marriott, Selwyn & Blovnt, 1923.
- José Mathias (José Mathias in José Mathias and A Man of Talent): translation by Luís Marques, George G. Harap & Co., 1947.
- Pacheco (A man of talent in José Mathias and A Man of Talent): translation by Luís Marques, George G. Harap & Co., 1947.
- Alves & Cia (The Yellow Sofa in Yellow Sofa and Three Portraits): translation by John Vetch, Carcanet Press, 1993. Also published by New Directions, 1996. Published as Alves & Co. by Dedalus in 2012.
- Um Poeta Lírico (Lyric Poet in Yellow Sofa and Three Portraits): translation by John Vetch, Carcanet Press, 1993. Also published by New Directions, 1996.
- José Mathias (José Mathias in Yellow Sofa and Three Portraits): translation by Luís Marques, Carcanet Press, 1993. Also published by New Directions, 1996.
- Pacheco (A man of talent in Yellow Sofa and Three Portraits): translation by Luís Marques, Carcanet Press, 1993. Also published by New Directions, 1996.
- O Mistério da Estrada de Sintra (The Mystery of the Sintra Road): translation by Margaret Jull Costa, Dedalus Books, 2013
- São Cristóvão (Saint Christopher): translation by Gregory Rabassa and Earl E. Fritz, Tagus Press, 2015
- Adam and Eve in Paradise (Adão e Eva no Paraíso): translation by Margaret Jull Costa, New Directions, 2025.

== Adaptations ==
Several cinema and TV adaptations of Eça's works can be found at:

The first adaptation of an Eça de Queirós novel was probably O Primo Basílio, which has been adapted five times for cinema and television

Os Maias has been adapted three times. The first, in 1979, by RTP Rádio e Televisão de Portugal as a 3 episode TV series. The second in 2001 by Rede Globo as a series, available through Globo's Streaming Service Globoplay. The third, again by RTP, was in 2015 as a 4-episode TV Series (that has also a condensed theatrical movie version). This series is available on RTPs streaming service RTP Play.

There have been two film versions of O Crime do Padre Amaro, a Mexican one in 2002 and a Portuguese version in 2005. released shortly after the film. Both these adaptations were modernised versions of the novel. In 2023, it was, again, adapted into a 6-episode TV series for RTP Rádio e Televisão de Portugal, now faithfully set in 1860.

Eça's works have been also adapted on Brazilian television. In 1988 Rede Globo produced O Primo Basílio in 35 episodes. Later, in 2007, a movie adaptation of the same novel was made by director Daniel Filho. In 2001 Rede Globo produced an acclaimed adaptation of Os Maias as a television series in 40 episodes.

A movie adaptation of O Mistério da Estrada de Sintra was produced in 2007. The director had shortly before directed a series inspired in a whodunit involving the alleged descendants of the original novel's characters (Nome de Código Sintra, Code Name Sintra), The movie was more centered on Eça's and Ramalho Ortigão's writing and publishing of the original serial and the controversy it created and less around the book's plot itself.

In September 2014, film director João Botelho released the film Os Maias based on the novel with the same name Os Maias.

Galleon Theatre Company, the resident producing company at the Greenwich Playhouse, London, has staged theatre adaptations by Alice de Sousa of Eça de Queiroz' novels. In 2001 the company presented Cousin Basílio, and in 2002 The Maias.
