= Harcourt interpolation =

British scandal

Part of column 4, page 7 of The Times for 23 January 1882: First edition (left), replacement edition (right)

The Harcourt interpolation was a scandal of Victorian London in which a rogue compositor inserted an obscene remark—"The speaker then said he felt inclined for a bit of fucking"—into a page proof for The Times newspaper, in the middle of a speech by William Harcourt, a leading politician of the day. The addition was not noticed until after the first edition had been printed and efforts to recall the copies were not entirely successful.

== Article ==
In January 1882, as Parliament was not sitting, The Times included lengthy verbatim reports from speeches given by politicians outside Parliament. On Sunday 22 January, the Attorney General Sir Henry James and Home Secretary Sir William Harcourt went to Burton upon Trent to open the St Paul's Institute, afterwards addressing speeches towards a crowd of between 7,000 and 8,000. Harcourt made reference to a by-election campaign then being fought in the North Riding of Yorkshire (polling day was Thursday 26 January), in which the Liberal candidate, Samuel Rowlandson, was a tenant farmer. The Times decided to print a verbatim report of both speeches in the edition to be published on the next morning, Monday 23 January 1882.

The Times' compositors were in dispute with the newspaper management and the report of Harcourt's speech printed in the first edition read (the '/' represent end-of-line in the original):

I saw in a Tory journal the other day a note of alarm, in / which they said "Why, if a tenant-farmer is elected / for the North Riding of Yorkshire the farmers will / be a political power who will have to be reckoned with". / The speaker then said he felt inclined for a bit of fucking. / I think that is very likely. (Laughter). But I think / it is rather an extraordinary thing that the Tory party / have not found that out before.

— The Times, 23 January 1882

The interpolation was not noticed until after the first edition had been printed and distributed. The Times sent out urgent telegraph messages to recall all unsold copies.

== Removal ==
According to the collector of erotic literature Henry Spencer Ashbee, when spotted the line was replaced by stars in subsequent editions. Sir William Harcourt's son Lewis noted in his diary that the "disgraceful interpolation of an obscene line" had been "discovered before the second edition was published and so it only appears in the first". Talk about the misprint became widespread and many curious people sought to see it; this demand combined with the restricted supply (due to The Times efforts to recall all copies containing it) to raise the market price of editions containing it. A newspaper with a cover price of 3d. was changing hands for 12s. 6d. by the middle of the morning. Sir Edward Walter Hamilton noted in his diary on 26 January that copies were selling "at all sorts of fancy prices" and reported that Lord Wolverton had told him they were fetching 20s. at Brighton on 25 January. The Dublin Freeman's Journal reported that £5 was being offered for copies.

== Apology ==
A revised copy was printed for subscribers and for libraries that kept bound copies, but The Times wrote nothing more about the incident immediately. Sir Edward Walter Hamilton noted on 26 January that Sir William Harcourt had not received an apology, and wrote that "Harcourt will never hear the end of it" (although Hamilton regarded the story primarily as amusing). However an apology appeared in the issue for Friday 27 January 1882:

No pains have been spared by the management of this journal to discover the author of a gross outrage committed by the interpolation of a line in the speech of Sir William Harcourt … and it is hoped that the perpetrator of this outrage will be brought to punishment.

— The Times, 27 January 1882

Sir Edward Walter Hamilton noted that the effect of this paragraph was to draw "more attention than ever to the compositor's obscene line". The incident was reported by the Portuguese writer, journalist and diplomat Eça de Queiroz in an article which now forms part of his book Cartas de Inglaterra. Samuel Palmer, in compiling a quarterly index to The Times, included a reference:

Harcourt (Sir W.) at Burton on Trent, 23 j 7 c
———Gross Line Maliciously Interpolated in a
Few Copies only of the Issue, 23 j 7 d — 27 j 9 f

== Later developments ==
According to Peter Brown, production editor of The Times in 1992, the compositor responsible was identified after an inquiry as G. Price; fellow Times journalist Philip Howard described him as "a disgruntled compositor who had been given his cards [i.e. been dismissed from his job]". A few months later a similar addition was made to an advertisement for the book Everyday Life in Our Public Schools in the issue of The Times for 12 June 1882. This book was said to include "a glossary of some words used by Henry Irving in his disquisitions upon fucking, which is in common use in these schools". The Times maintained a dignified silence about it, but for many years after it was a rule on the paper that any compositor who was sacked left immediately with a payoff and did not work out a period of notice. The copy of the edition containing the misprint delivered to the Library of the British Museum was removed from the general collection and suppressed.

Bob Clarke, author of From Grub Street to Fleet Street, reported that a copy of The Times featuring the misprint had changed hands for £100 at an auction in the mid-1990s.

== Bibliography ==
- Eça de Queiroz, Cartas de Inglaterra: "Uma partida feita ao Times"
- G. L. Simons, The Illustrated Book of Sexual Records (cited at)
