= The Mystery of the Sintra Road =

1870 Portuguese novel

- Cover of the 2013 English-language version
- Author: José Maria de Eça de Queirós and Ramalho Ortigão
- Original title: O Mistério da Estrada de Sintra
- Translator: Margaret Jull Costa and Nick Phillips
- Cover artist: Marie Lane/ Alfred Wierusz-Kowalski
- Language: Portuguese
- Series: Dedalus European Classics
- Genre: Crime
- Publisher: Dedalus
- Publication date: 1870
- Publication place: Portugal
- English publication date: 2013
- Pages: 283
- ISBN: 9781909232297

The Mystery of the Sintra Road (Portuguese: O Mistério da Estrada de Sintra) is the first novel published by José Maria de Eça de Queirós, initially as a newspaper serialization in 1870 and subsequently as a book. It was co-written with Ramalho Ortigão. It is considered to be the first Portuguese detective story. An English translation by Margaret Jull Costa and Nick Phillips was published in 2013, and includes an Afterword by Phillips and the Preface to the Third Portuguese edition by the authors.

== Background ==
The authors first met when Eça de Queirós was a student of Ortigão at the Colégio da Irmandade da Lapa in Porto. The friendship also resulted in collaboration on a monthly magazine As Farpas (1871–83), which caricatured Portuguese life. The friendship lasted throughout their lives, and Ortigão was with Eça when the latter died in Switzerland.

Despite his young age of 24 at the time of publication, Eça de Queirós had already visited Egypt as a journalist for the Lisbon newspaper Diário de Notícias, to cover the inauguration of the Suez Canal. The Mystery of the Sintra Road was initially published in Diário de Notícias, in the form of 66 letters to the editor that were reproduced in the serials section of the newspaper between July 24 and September 27, 1870. It was published as if it were a true story about an alleged kidnapping (with the knowledge of the newspaper's editor, Eduardo Coelho, who was a friend of Eça's family). The bet Coelho made with the two authors that only the last instalment would reveal to the readers the writer's identity was very successful. Portuguese readers were already familiar with serialized crime and detective novels, particularly from France and this serialization became extremely popular, despite being in part a parody of the French genre. It captured the imagination of and even frightened the people of Lisbon, many of whom thought it was describing true events, and resulted in copies of the daily paper being sold out. Despite this success and that of the subsequent book, the authors describe it in the Preface to the third edition of the book in 1884, perhaps tongue-in-cheek, as “atrocious”, noting that “it contains a little of everything that a novelist ought not to include, and almost everything that a critic would wish to see removed”. The text was heavily reworked by Eça de Queirós prior to publication of the third edition, such that he was the lead author for the book version, whereas Ortigão's name had come first at the end of the serialization.

Beginning in January, 2017 Diário de Notícias re-issued the novel as a serialization of 20 instalments, based on the third edition of the book rather than the original newspaper version. .

== The story ==
Two friends, one of whom is a doctor and the other known only as “F”, are kidnapped on the way back to Lisbon from Sintra by three masked men and taken to a mysterious house. In the house they discover a corpse. The doctor is asked to confirm the death and identify the cause. In the early hours another man, known only as A.M.C., enters the house and is detained. He appears to know already of the death and says that the deceased died of opium poisoning but denies involvement. The doctor is subsequently released, without “F”. To strengthen the impression for the newspaper's readers that this is a true story the next instalment is an anonymous letter from “Z”, a friend of A.M.C., who reports that A.M.C. has gone missing. However, the letter stresses that he could not have been the murderer as he was with friends at the time of the death. This is followed by a letter to the doctor from “F”, describing his captivity and indicating that the neighbouring house is supposed to be haunted and is occupied by a German investigating the paranormal, or spiritism, with whom he communicates through a hole in the party wall and to whom he gives the letter for the doctor. However, he fails to ask the German the address of the house in which he is held, although he concludes that it is in Lisbon and may well be a gambling den.

Following another letter from “Z” to again defend A.M.C., one of the kidnappers, identified only as the “tall masked man”, then writes a lengthy letter to the paper. This introduces an English officer called Captain Rytmel, and the reader learns of the captain's involvement with the masked man's cousin, Countess W., and of his survival of an earlier murder attempt by a former lover, Carmen, who subsequently died. The tall masked man's letter is followed by a letter from A.M.C. in which he describes how he became involved in the whole affair. He confirms the reader's assumption that the deceased is Captain Rytmel, and informs the reader that the murderer has been summoned to the house to be judged by the three masked men, “F”, and A.M.C. This section is followed by a letter from the murderer, explaining how the death happened. The last instalment includes a note announcing that the story was fiction, signed by its two authors.

== Criticism ==
The instalments and the subsequent book were well received by the public. Recent criticism considers that this enthusiasm was justified. While the book does include passages of excessive Romanticism that sound bloated to contemporary ears, it is an exciting story in which the characters "are flawed and pathetic without being pitiable."

== Dramatisation ==
The novel was made into a film (O Mistério da Estrada de Sintra) in 2007, directed by Jorge Paixão da Costa.
