= Mandarin paradox =

Ethical parable by Chateaubriand

The Mandarin paradox is an ethical parable used to illustrate the difficulty of fulfilling moral obligations when moral punishment is unlikely or impossible, leading to moral disengagement. It has been used to underscore the fragility of ethical standards when moral agents are separated by physical, cultural, or other distance, especially as facilitated by globalization. It was first posed by French writer Chateaubriand in The Genius of Christianity (1802):

I ask my own heart, I put to myself this question: "If thou couldst by a mere wish kill a fellow-creature in China, and inherit his fortune in Europe, with the supernatural conviction that the fact would never be known, wouldst thou consent to form such a wish?"

The paradox is famously used to foreshadow the character development of the arriviste Eugène de Rastignac in Balzac's novel Père Goriot. Rastignac asks Bianchon if he recalls the paradox, to which Bianchon first replies that he is "at [his] thirty-third mandarin", but then states that he would refuse to take an unknown man's life regardless of circumstance. Rastignac wrongly attributes the quote to Jean-Jacques Rousseau, which propagated to later writings.

== In fiction ==
- The Mandarin by Eça de Queiroz
- "Button, Button" by Richard Matheson (plus movie The Box)
- The Count of Monte Cristo by Alexandre Dumas
- "The Murder of the Mandarin" in The Grim Smile of the Five Towns by Arnold Bennett

== See also ==
- Ring of Gyges

== Bibliography ==
- Champsaur F., Le Mandarin, Paris, P. Ollendorff, 1895‐1896 (réimprimé sous le nom L’Arriviste, Paris, Albin Michel, 1902)
- Schneider L. Tuer le Mandarin // Le Gaulois, 18 juillet 1926, no 17818
- Paul Ronal. Tuer le mandarin // Revue de littirature comparee 10, no. 3 (1930): 520–23.
- E. Latham // Une cita􀁒on de Rousseau // Mercure de France, 1er juin 1947, no 1006, p. 393.
- Barbey B. «Tuer le Mandarin» // Mercure de France, 1er septembre 1947, no 1009
- Laurence W. Keates. Mysterious Miraculous Mandarin: Origins, Literary Paternity, Implications in Ethics // Revue de littirature comparee 40, no. 4 (1966): 497–525,
- Antonio Coimbra Martins. O mandarim assassinado // Ensaios Queirosianos: «0 mandarim assassinado». "0 incesto d"os maias,' imitagdo capital". (Lisbon, 1967), pp. 27–28.
- Eric Hayot. The Hypothetical Mandarin: Sympathy, Modernity, and Chinese Pain. Oxford, New York: Oxford University Press, 2009
