= To the Capital =

Novel by the Portuguese writer José Maria de Eça de Queirós

- Cover of the 1997 Carcanet Press version
- Author: José Maria de Eça de Queirós
- Original title: A Capital!
- Translator: John Vetch
- Language: Portuguese
- Genre: Realism
- Publisher: Carcanet Press
- Publication date: 1925
- Publication place: Portugal
- English publication date: May 1997
- Pages: 304
- ISBN: 9781857541977

To the Capital (Portuguese: A Capital!) is a novel by José Maria de Eça de Queirós (1845 - 1900), also known as Eça de Queiroz. It was first published posthumously in Portuguese in 1925 following revisions to the text by Eça’s son. The first English version, translated by John Vetch, was published by Carcanet Press in 1997. The novel tells the story of a young man from the Portuguese provinces who dreams of literary fame in the capital, Lisbon, and his experiences in unsuccessfully trying to achieve that fame.

== Background ==
Eça died in 1900. Several of his novels were published posthumously, partly because they were considered too scandalous for the sensibility of the Portuguese of the late 1800s. To the Capital was published after editing and rewriting by his son, also named José Maria. In general, reviewers have not thought highly of the quality of the editing of his father’s books and his work in the case of To the Capital is no exception.

== The novel ==
To the Capital is the story of Artur Corvelo, a young man who has literary ambitions and has a desire to be known by intellectuals and by the society of Lisbon. He is sent to the historic University of Coimbra, but spends most of his time there dreaming of becoming a poet, and moving in literary circles where he is accepted for his devotion to culture rather than for his talent. After the death of both of his parents and after failing his courses, he finds himself left with a small sum of money and venereal disease. Every submission of poetry to a magazine meets with failure. After some time he inherits enough money from his godfather to go to Lisbon. There he succeeds in publishing the poems but they are not well received, and a play he has written goes unproduced. He also experiences a number of misadventures. Eventually, he has to return to the provinces to live off his aunts.

== Reviews ==
The Complete Review sees the novel as an entertaining satire of small-time literary life in Portugal, with a “nice mix of engaging characters”. However, it notes that the story advances somewhat fitfully and is not truly gripping, possibly the result of the poor editing by the author’s son. Ana Paula de Araújo notes that, while chronicling Artur's disillusionment and disappointments, the book excoriates the society of its time and its ineffective Romantic pedagogy and schooling, “emphasizing the vices that the author recognized in such a society”. She argues that the social types identified in the novel are still very much recognizable in today's Lisbon. Paulo Neves da Silva considers Eça’s description of Artur’s time spent in Lisbon to be “hilarious and sarcastic”, leading to an “unforgettable novel”. He likewise dubs To the Capital a magnificent portrayal of the society of the time, achieved through a painstaking description of the characters' mores and motivations, their petty personalities and the hypocritical social circles that help perpetuate them.
