= Os Maias (film) =

2014 film directed by João Botelho

- Promotional poster
- Directed by: João Botelho
- Based on: Os Maias by Eça de Queirós
- Produced by: Alexandre Oliveira
- Starring: Graciano Dias; Maria Flor; Marcello Urgeghe; Catarina Wallenstein; Pedro Inês; Pedro Lacerda; Hugo Mestre Amaro
- Cinematography: João Ribeiro
- Edited by: João Braz
- Music by: Diogo Vida
- Production company: Ar de Filmes
- Release date: September 11, 2014 (Portugal)
- Countries: Portugal; Brazil
- Language: Portuguese
- Budget: €1.5 million
- Box office: €1.36

Os Maias (lit. 'The Mayans') is a 2014 Portuguese film directed by João Botelho and based on the 19th century novel Os Maias by Eça de Queirós. It was released on 11 September 2014.

== Cast ==
- Graciano Dias as Carlos da Maia
- Maria Flor as Maria Eduarda
- Marcello Urgeghe as Craft
- Catarina Wallenstein as Maria Monforte
- Pedro Inês as João da Ega
- Pedro Lacerda as Thomaz d'Alencar
- Hugo Mestre Amaro as Dâmaso Salcede
- João Perry
- Laura Soveral
- Ricardo Aibeo
- Filipe Vargas
- Adriano Luz
- Ana Moreira
- Rita Blanco
- Maria João Pinho
- Jorge Vaz de Carvalho as narrator (voice)

== Release ==
Os Maias premiered at the Teatro Nacional São João on 11 September 2014 in Portugal.
