= The Illustrious House of Ramires =

Novel by the Portuguese writer José Maria de Eça de Queirós

- Author: José Maria de Eça de Queirós
- Original title: A Ilustre Casa de Ramires
- Translator: Margaret Jull Costa
- Language: Portuguese
- Publisher: Dedalus
- Publication date: 1900
- Publication place: Portugal
- English publication date: 2017
- ISBN: 9781910213391

The Illustrious House of Ramires (Portuguese: A Ilustre Casa de Ramires) was the final novel written by the Portuguese writer José Maria de Eça de Queirós (1845-1900) and was published posthumously. A new English translation, by Margaret Jull Costa, was published in 2017, together with an Afterword by the translator. It has been described as a “satiric look at the existential state of Portuguese society on the brink of the modern age”.

== Plot ==
Set in late nineteenth-century Portugal, the main character is Gonçalo Mendes Ramires, a weak-willed aristocrat, dreamer and amateur historian who, as a bachelor, is the last of a line of a noble family that predates even the King of Portugal. He is often referred to in the book simply as “The Nobleman” but he lacks the funds for the upkeep of his estate and receives regular demands from his creditors. Gonçalo feels proud of the Ramires legacy, while aware of his failure to live up to the chivalry and heroism of his forebears. To strengthen the family name and advance his own reputation, he decides to describe some of these past achievements in a “novella”, to be published in a friend's literary magazine. In the process he borrows from an epic poem about the family by an uncle and from some novels by Walter Scott. One review describes him as a “creative plagiarist”.

The novel humorously records Gonçalo's struggles to write his novella while, at the same time, running for and being elected as a Member of Parliament. As the story proceeds, Gonçalo convinces himself that he is personally on a path that would impress his forefathers and as Lorin Stein notes, the reader becomes unsure whether Gonçalo “has crossed the fine line between idiocy and genius”. The novel includes sections of the novella-in-progress as Gonçalo gradually gets round to writing them. These record the romanticised courage (and cruelty) of his medieval ancestor, Tructesindo Ramires, which Eça de Queirós contrasts with Gonçalo's own cowardice.

Gonçalo fails to live up to his own ideal of a nobleman. To become a parliamentarian, he is willing to switch political allegiance, to forgive an enemy and to expose his sister to the attentions of that enemy. He is thus one of the most contradictory and complex characters in fiction. In addition to being a coward he is lazy and lacking in self-confidence and not a man to keep his word. He suffers from pride and throws tantrums. At the same time he is generous to the poor and is a nobleman who freely mixes with friends from outside the nobility, and in most ways is an honourable man.

== Historical context ==
The novel first appeared in serial form, in Revista Moderna, starting in November 1897, but publication was interrupted when the magazine went out of business in 1899. Eça completed the story but died before revising the final parts. The story has been seen as an allegory of the situation faced by Portugal, of a nation attempting to live up to a supposedly heroic past. In an Afterword to the novel, the translator notes that, when the novel was being written, Portugal was on the losing side in a conflict with Britain in southern Africa, when, following the so-called British Ultimatum, Portugal was forced to undertake a deeply humiliating withdrawal from disputed territories.
