= The Mandarin (novel) =

Novella by the Portuguese writer José Maria de Eça de Queirós

The Mandarin (and Other Stories)
- Cover of the 2009 English-language version
- Author: José Maria de Eça de Queirós
- Original title: O Mandarim
- Translator: Margaret Jull Costa
- Cover artist: Marie Lane
- Language: Portuguese
- Series: Dedalus European Classics
- Genre: Fantasy
- Publisher: Dedalus
- Publication date: 1880
- Publication place: Portugal
- English publication date: 1963 (The Bodley Head); 1993 (Dedalus)
- Pages: 84
- ISBN: 9781903517802

The Mandarin (Portuguese: O Mandarim) is a novella on the sin of avarice by José Maria de Eça de Queirós (1845–1900), also known as Eça de Queiroz. It was first published in Portuguese in 1880. The first English version, translated by Richard Franko Goldman, was published by The Bodley Head in 1965. A translation by Margaret Jull Costa was published by Dedalus Books in 1993. A revised version was published by Dedalus in 2009, together with three short stories.

== Background ==
The story was serialized in a shorter version in the Diário de Portugal and, with the addition of six chapters, it was sold as a book in 1881. It was initially attacked as being a departure from the realist style used by Eça in his earlier works. He was also accused of plagiarising the idea from a story by Alphonse Daudet, although The Mandarin was accepted for serialization in the French Revue Universelle Internationale in 1884.

== Plot ==
Teodoro, a poor Portuguese civil servant in Lisbon, receives a visit from the Devil in disguise who offers him the chance of inheriting unlimited riches if he rings a bell placed on a book by his side, which will lead to the death of a rich Mandarin, Ti Chin-fu, in distant China. This Teodoro duly does, resulting in his inheriting the Mandarin's fortune and starting to spend enormous sums. However, he finds that fabulous wealth brings with it unexpected problems. In time, remorse sends him to China to look for the dead Mandarin’s family. Having failed to locate them, he returns to Lisbon, still haunted by the crime. His attempts to renounce the inheritance come to nothing. Sensing that he is dying he bequeaths his millions to the Devil, with the observation that “The only bread that tastes good is the bread we earn day by day with our own hands: never kill the Mandarin”.

== Reviews ==
Keates describes the novella as a "brilliant mischievous essay in fantasy chinoiserie, irreverently subverting the trope, created half a century earlier by Balzac in La Peau de chagrin, of the Oriental curse masquerading as a blessing". Another reviewer considers that the choice made by Teodoro was a "reworking of the 'Mandarin paradox' first posed by French writer Chateaubriand in 1802". Sobre notes the way Eça uses allegory to make criticism of society and the human condition, observing that the novel provides interesting observations on the relationship between people’s possessions and the way others treat them, as well as on the morality of humans.

== Adaptations ==
The book was adapted as a Portuguese TV miniseries in 1991.
