= Alves & Co. =

Novella by José Maria de Eça de Queirós

- Cover of the 2012 English-language version
- Author: José Maria de Eça de Queirós
- Original title: Alves & Companhia
- Translator: Margaret Jull Costa
- Cover artist: Marie Lane/ Carlos Botelho
- Language: Portuguese
- Series: Dedalus European Classics
- Genre: Realism
- Publisher: Dedalus
- Publication date: 1925
- Publication place: Portugal
- English publication date: 1988 (University Press of America; 1993 (Carcanet Press); 2012 (Dedalus)
- Pages: 101
- ISBN: 9781903517895

Alves & Co. (Portuguese: Alves & Companhia) is a novella by José Maria de Eça de Queirós, also known as Eça de Queiroz. It was only first published in Portuguese in 1925, 25 years after the author's death. The first English version, Alves and Co., was translated by Robert M. Fedorchek and published by the University Press of America in 1988. This was followed by a translation titled The Yellow Sofa, by John Vetch and published by Carcanet Press in 1993. The latest translation, by Margaret Jull Costa, was published by Dedalus Books in 2012, together with six short stories by the same author. Alves & Co. is a comic novella on the theme of infidelity and its consequences.

== Background ==
The story was found by Eça's son, José Maria, together with other writing, in a locked trunk. After deciphering his father's "vertiginous” script", José Maria addressed what he perceived as stylistic imperfections by editing the text on almost every page, removing semi-colons and dashes, changing the syntax and grammatical structure and adding adjectives. The novella was eventually released in 1925.

== Plot ==
Alves & Co. concerns Godfredo Alves. He had a successful import-export business in Lisbon in the last decades of the 19th century, in partnership with his friend Machado. Godofredo admires Machado's success with women and makes no complaint when he absents himself from the office to further these relationships. One day he arrives at the office to find Machado absent again. Thinking of Machado's successful romances, he then remembers that it is his own wedding anniversary and, after buying a present for his wife, Ludovina, returns home early, only to find Machado in an embrace with her on the yellow sofa of his house.

Machado runs away. With the help of a financial incentive, Godofredo persuades his father-in-law to take back his wife. He also feels the need to regain his honour through challenging Machado to a duel. The story is really about his half-hearted efforts to achieve this; the contrast between the feeling that he must stand up for his honour and that of not wanting to get hurt or killed, despite his suggestion to Machado of a suicide pact. Eventually his friends, originally approached to be seconds, arrange a compromise that avoids a duel. In time he gets back together with his wife and, once again, becomes friends with Machado.

== Reviews and other observations ==
Adultery, more precisely female adultery, is a recurrent theme in Eça's work. The novella has been described as a "nice, small portrait of Portuguese bourgeois life ... a fine little story, but a satire of the gentlest sort". The humour comes through the ways the characters each try to smooth things over by turning a blind eye to the truth. "It is an amusing tale of a weak-willed but sympathetic man trying to make the best of a situation that's beyond his capacity." As Conall Cash puts it, the novella explores "ways in which Alves' bourgeois consciousness reacts to this catastrophe, and how his romantic, chivalrous side battles with and inevitably loses out to the respectable, conservative pose of the businessman". Cash sees the work as an allegory for Portuguese society of the time. Cash also highlights the role of Portuguese colonialism in this story and many others by Eça; in Alves & Co., Godofredo runs a trading house dealing with the colonies.

== Opera adaptation ==
An opera based on Alves & Co., The Yellow Sofa by Julian Philips with a libretto by Edward Kemp, conducted by Leo McFall and directed by Frederic Wake-Walker was performed for the first time at Glyndebourne opera house in the United Kingdom in 2009. The Yellow Sofa was then revived for the Glyndebourne tour in 2012, and performed across the UK. In 2020, the opera was scheduled to receive its Hungarian premiere directed by András Almási-Tóth.
