= O Crime do Padre Amaro (film) =

- Directed by: Carlos Coelho da Silva
- Based on: O Crime do Padre Amaro by Eça de Queirós
- Starring: Soraia Chaves; Jorge Corrula; Nicolau Breyner
- Release date: 27 October 2005 (Portugal)
- Running time: 120 minutes
- Country: Portugal
- Language: Portuguese
- Box office: €1,643,842.88 (Portugal)

O Crime do Padre Amaro is a 2005 Portuguese drama film directed by Carlos Coelho da Silva and based on the 19th century novel of the same name by Eça de Queirós. It stars Soraia Chaves, Jorge Corrula and Nicolau Breyner.

== Cast ==
- Jorge Corrula - Father Amaro
- Soraia Chaves - Amélia
- Nicolau Breyner - Father Dias
- Glória Férias - Joaneira
- Ana Bustorff - Gertrudes
- Alberto Magassela - Alberto
- Cláudia Semedo - Carolina
- Nuno Melo - José Eduardo

== Reception ==
It's the Portuguese film with the highest number of admissions at the Portuguese box office since 2004, with a total of 380,671 and also the second highest-grossing Portuguese film at the Portuguese box office in the same period with a total box office gross of €1,643,842.88.

In Público's Ípsilon, Jorge Mourinha gave the film a rating of "mediocre".
