= The Crime of Padre Amaro =

- International theatrical release poster
- Directed by: Carlos Carrera
- Written by: Vicente Leñero
- Based on: O Crime do Padre Amaro by Eça de Queiroz
- Produced by: Daniel Birman Ripstein; Alfredo Ripstein
- Starring: Gael García Bernal; Ana Claudia Talancón
- Cinematography: Guillermo Granillo
- Edited by: Óscar Figueroa
- Music by: Rosino Serrano
- Production companies: Almeda Films; Blu Films; Wanda Films
- Distributed by: Nirvana Films (Spain); Columbia TriStar Film Distributors International (International)
- Release dates: 16 August 2002 (Mexico); 8 November 2002 (Spain)
- Running time: 118 minutes
- Countries: Mexico; Spain
- Language: Spanish
- Budget: $1.8 million
- Box office: $27 million

The Crime of Padre Amaro (Spanish: El crimen del padre Amaro, known by its literal translation The Crime of Father Amaro in Australia) is a 2002 drama film directed by Carlos Carrera and loosely based on the novel O Crime do Padre Amaro (1875) by 19th-century Portuguese writer José Maria de Eça de Queiroz. The film stars Gael García Bernal, Ana Claudia Talancón and Sancho Gracia. It premiered on 16 August 2002 in Mexico City.

When it was released, The Crime of Padre Amaro caused a controversy on the part of Roman Catholic groups in Mexico who tried to stop the film from being screened. They failed, and the film became the biggest box office draw ever in the country, beating previous record holder, Sexo, pudor y lágrimas (1999), with a gross of $16.3 million.

In the United States of America, this film also enjoyed commercial success; Columbia-TriStar Home Entertainment paid less than $1 million to acquire the film's North American distribution rights and released the film theatrically through Samuel Goldwyn Films; the film went on to gross $5.7 million in limited theatrical release in the United States and Canada.

At the 75th Academy Awards, the film was nominated for the Best Foreign Language Film Oscar.

== Plot ==
Recently ordained a priest, 24-year-old Father Amaro arrives in Los Reyes, a small town in the fictional state of Aldama, to start his life serving the church. He is a protégé of a ruthless political bishop, while the local priest, Father Benito, is having a long ongoing affair with a local restaurant owner. Benito is building a large hospital and recuperation center, which is partially funded by a cartel's drug lord. Meanwhile, another priest in the area, Father Natalio, the only clergyman portrayed positively in the film, is under investigation for supporting left-wing insurgents in his secluded rural church area.

Amélia, a local 16-year-old girl, teaches catechism to the young children in the town, and is the daughter of Benito's mistress. At the start of the story, she is contemplating marriage to Rubén, a young journalist beginning his career, but tension is depicted as Rubén is a non-believer and Amélia is strongly Catholic. Rubén's father is an avowed anti-clerical atheist who is unpopular within the town for his strong opinions.

Amaro soon becomes infatuated with Amélia, who is strongly attracted to him and asks awkward questions about love and sin in the confessional, admitting that she masturbates to Jesus. She later touches his hand while serving him at the restaurant. The newspaper is tipped off about Benito baptising the drug lord's newborn child, and Rubén is asked to write about the scandals in his hometown. With the aid of mountains of evidence compiled by his father, he publishes a story about Benito's hospital being a front for money laundering. The church has Amaro write a denial and Rubén is then sacked by the newspaper under pressure from the Catholic lobby. Amélia then phones Rubén and dumps him, berating him with a string of obscenities. Rubén's family home is vandalized by devout Catholics and when he returns home, he assaults Amaro when he sees him in the street. Amaro decides not to press charges, and Rubén avoids jail time.

The film delves into the struggle priests have between desire and obedience. Amaro is plagued with guilt about his feelings for Amélia. When the local press begins to reveal the secrets of the parish, Amaro turns to his superior, Benito.

Amaro and Amélia start an affair, and Amaro cites verses from the Song of Songs as he seduces her. Later he drapes a robe meant for the statue of Virgin Mary over Amélia during a secret meeting. After Amélia becomes pregnant with Amaro's child, he tries to convince her to leave town to protect him. Later, she decides to try to trick the town by trying to pass off Rubén as the father. She tries to reunite with him and organize a wedding at short notice so that the baby can be attributed to him, but he tells her he is no longer interested.

When Benito threatens to report Amaro, Amaro threatens to retaliate over Benito's affair. During an ensuing scuffle, Benito is injured by a fall and is subsequently hospitalized. Eventually, Amaro arranges for a backstreet abortion in the middle of the night. It goes wrong, and Amélia begins to bleed out. Amaro drives her to the hospital in a large city, but she dies before they get there. Amaro weeps.

The lurid details of the case are suppressed, but Benito and a cynical old woman know what has happened. A false story is passed around the town, blaming Rubén for impregnating Amélia before marriage, and praising Amaro for breaking into the abortion clinic and liberating Amélia in a failed attempt to save her and her child. Amaro presides over Amélia's funeral, packed with mourners. Benito, now using a wheelchair, turns and rolls away in disgust.

== Cast ==
- Gael García Bernal – Padre Amaro
- Ana Claudia Talancón – Amélia
- Sancho Gracia – Padre Benito
- Luisa Huertas – Dionisia
- Andrés Montiel – Rubén
- Damián Alcázar – Padre Natalio
- Ernesto Gómez Cruz – Bishop
- Gastón Melo – Martin
- Angélica Aragón – Augustina Sanjuanera

== Reception ==
=== Critical response ===
The Crime of Padre Amaro sparked a controversy in Mexico at the time of its release, with Catholic bishops and organizations asking people not to see it and demanding that the government ban it.

Review aggregator Rotten Tomatoes counted 83 reviews with a 61% approval rating. The average rating is 6.19/10. The critics consensus on the website states that "Though melodramatic, El Crimen del Padre Amaro's critique of the Catholic church is a timely one." On Metacritic, it has a score of 60 out of 100, indicating "mixed or average reviews" based on 29 critic reviews.

== Accolades ==
The film was nominated for over 30 awards, including an Academy Awards nomination and a Golden Globe Award for Best Foreign Language Film in 2003, winning 19.

== See also ==
- Sins, a controversial 2005 Indian film with a similar theme.
- List of submissions to the 75th Academy Awards for Best Foreign Language Film
- List of Mexican submissions for the Academy Award for Best Foreign Language Film
