= Aveiro =

Aveiro may refer to:

- Aveiro, Pará, a municipality in Brazil
- Aveiro, Portugal, a city and municipality in Portugal
  - Região de Aveiro, surrounding the city above
  - Aveiro District, surrounding the municipality above
  - Roman Catholic Diocese of Aveiro, surrounding the city above
  - Aveiro Lagoon (Ria de Aveiro), near the city above
    - Aveiro Light, at the entrance to the lagoon above

== People ==
- Dukes of Aveiro, an aristocratic Portuguese title, granted in 1535
- Cristiano Ronaldo dos Santos Aveiro (born 1985), Portuguese footballer
- Kátia Aveiro (born 1977), Portuguese singer
- José Aveiro (1936–2024), Paraguayan footballer
