= Os Maias =

Novel by the Portuguese writer José Maria de Eça de Queirós

The Maias
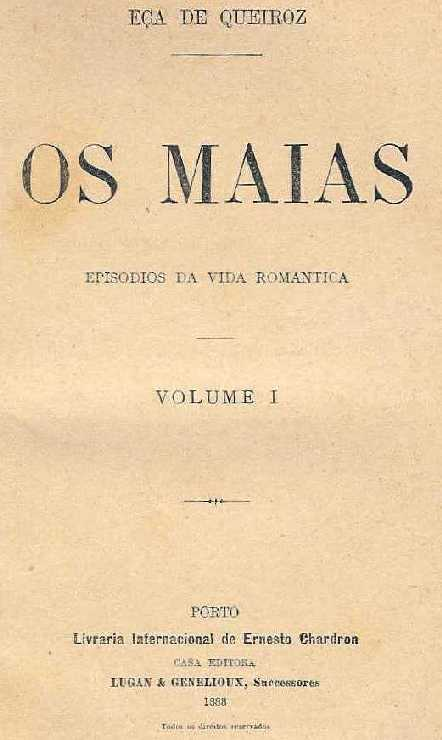
- Cover of volume 1 in the first edition (1888)
- Author: José Maria de Eça de Queiroz
- Original title: Os Maias
- Translator: Patricia McGowen Pinheiro; Ann Stevens
- Language: Portuguese
- Publisher: Livraria Internacional de Ernesto Chardron, Lugan e Genelioux
- Publication date: 1888
- Publication place: Portugal
- English publication date: 1965
- Media type: Print
- Pages: 990; 458pp (Vol. 1); 532pp (Vol. 2)
- ISBN: 9781716550669

If you are looking for the 2014 Portuguese film see Os Maias (film)

Os Maias: Episódios da Vida Romântica (Portuguese pronunciation: [uʒ ˈmajɐʃ]; "The Maias: Episodes of Romantic Life") is a realist novel by Portuguese author Eça de Queiroz. The novel follows the fictional eponymous family over the course of three generations.

As early as 1878, while serving in the Portuguese consulate at Newcastle upon Tyne, Eça had at least given a name to this book and had begun working on it. It was mainly written during his residence in Bristol, and it was first published in 1888.

The book largely concerns the life of young aristocrat Carlos da Maia in 1870s Portugal, when along with his best friend João da Ega he spends his time making witticisms about society and having affairs. The novel uses the Monarchy's decline in Portugal (late 19th century), as a predominant theme, reflecting its author's own regret at his country's slow decay.

== Plot summary ==
The book begins with the characters Carlos Eduardo da Maia, Afonso da Maia and Vilaça in the family's old house with plans to reconstruct it. The house, nicknamed "Ramalhete" (bouquet), is located in Lisbon. Its name comes from a tiled panel depicting a bouquet of sunflowers set on the place where the stone with the coat of arms should be. As the introductory scene goes on, the story of the Maia family is given, in a flashback style by Afonso.

Afonso da Maia, a well-mannered Portuguese man, is married to Maria Eduarda Runa and their marriage only produces one son – Pedro da Maia. Pedro da Maia, who is given the typical romantic education, becomes a weak, low-spirited and sensitive man. He is very close to his mother and is inconsolable after her death. He only recuperates when he meets a beautiful woman called Maria Monforte with whom he gets married despite his father's objection. The marriage produces a son, Carlos Eduardo, and a daughter, whose name is not revealed until much later. Some time later, Maria Monforte falls in love with Tancredo (an Italian who is staying at their house after being accidentally wounded by Pedro) and runs away to Italy with him, betraying Pedro and taking her daughter along. When Pedro finds out, he is heartbroken and goes with his son to his father's house where he, during the night, commits suicide. Carlos stays at his grandfather's house and is educated by him, receiving the typical British education (as Afonso would have liked to have raised his son).

Back in the present, Carlos is a wealthy, elegant gentleman who is a doctor and opens his own office. Later he meets a gorgeous woman at the Hotel Central just before a dinner organized by João da Ega (his friend and accomplice from University who lives with Carlos) in honor of Baron Cohen, the director of the National Bank. He meets her again later while walking with Steinbroken, a Finland's minister, near the Aterro, where he could better see her, and indeed fall in love with her. After many comical and disastrous adventures he finally discovers the woman's name, Maria Eduarda. Later, while Maria Eduarda was not at home, her daughter, Rosa, gets sick, and Dâmaso, Carlos's friend, finds Carlos to help her. This leads to Maria Eduarda calling him a few days later after Rosa gets a bit sick again, and after taking care of Rosa, Maria Eduarda has a conversation with Carlos. They become friends and start having regular meetings. After dozens of friendly meetings and other events, Maria reveals that she is also in love with Carlos, and they become lovers. Eventually Carlos finds out that Maria lied to him about her past and he starts fearing the worst. Mr. Guimarães, a good friend of Maria's mother and an uncle-like figure to her, talks to Ega and gives him a box meant to be given "to your friend Carlos... or to his sister!". Ega does not understand this statement, because Carlos supposedly never had a sister. Ega is horrified and in a state of shock when he realizes that Maria is Carlos's sister. Ega, in despair, tells everything to Vilaça (the Maia family attorney) who informs Carlos about the incest. Carlos doesn't inform his grandfather, but Afonso seems to discover it by himself and gradually falls more and more ill. However, Carlos cannot forget his love and does not say anything to Maria. Afonso dies because of apoplexy. At last, Carlos informs his newfound sister that they are siblings and that they cannot live like this anymore. Maria says one last goodbye to her former lover and to her friends before going away to an unknown future. Carlos, to forget his tragedies, goes on a trip around the world.

The book ends with a famous scene in Portugal, where Carlos returns to Lisbon 10 years after he left. He meets Ega and has a boys-only night to have fun together. At one point, they agree that there is nothing in the world that is worth running for. Ironically, as soon as they go out to the street, they realize that they missed the last cable car and they start running after it, shouting "We can still catch it, we can still catch it...!", closing the story in a both philosophical and comical way.

== Translations ==
The first English translation, by Patricia McGowan Pinheiro and Ann Stevens, was published in 1965 by St. Martins Press. In 2007 Dedalus Books published a new English translation by Margaret Jull Costa which won the 2008 Oxford-Weidenfeld Translation Prize.

== Film, TV and theatrical adaptations ==
In 2001 Rede Globo produced their acclaimed adaptation of Os Maias (including some elements from Eça's short novel The Relic) as a short soap-opera type serial in 40 chapters, which was shown from Tuesday to Friday during a ten-week period. It starred a very select group of Brazilian actors, most of them with long careers on TV, theatre and cinema. The screenplay was adapted by the renowned soap opera writer Maria Adelaide Amaral and directed by Luiz Fernando Carvalho. This is considered one of the most outstanding Globo productions in terms of photographic and overall artistic quality, but failed miserably, with low television ratings (often lower than a 9% audience share), probably because it was shown late at night.

== Other adaptations ==
Paula Rego painted a series of pastels, inspired by this novel, which have been exhibited in London.
