= As Farpas =

Monthly magazine published in Portugal from 1871 to 1882

- One of the original covers of the magazine
- Editor: Ramalho Ortigão and Eça de Queirós
- Categories: Social commentary
- Frequency: Monthly
- Founded: 1871
- Final issue: 1882
- Country: Portugal
- Based in: Lisbon
- Language: Portuguese

As Farpas (The Barbs) was a monthly publication started by the authors and journalists Ramalho Ortigão and Eça de Queirós. It first appeared in 1871, when the authors were, respectively, 35 and 26, and was published in Portugal until the end of 1882. Subtitled "The Country and Portuguese Society", the monthly issues presented a caricature of the society of the time and are considered an important contribution to Portuguese literature and the launching of critical journalism in the country.

== History ==
As Farpas was initiated in the same year in which the so-called Casino Conferences were held in Lisbon. At these conferences a group of young writers and intellectuals presented their suggestions to revolutionize Portuguese literature and cultural society of the time, based on the realist and naturalist philosophies of the French writer, Gustave Flaubert and others. It was the censorship imposed by the authorities on the conferences that is considered to have motivated, in large part, the authors to publish As Farpas.

The magazine was published monthly, beginning on June 17, 1871. The first edition that appeared on the newsstands in Lisbon was a booklet of about one hundred pages, with an orange cover, decorated with the devil Asmodeus, bearing the title "As Farpas" and with the subtitle "Monthly Chronicle of Politics, Letters and of Customs ". Initially, most of the articles were written by Eça but after the September-October 1872 issue he left the publication to pursue a diplomatic career in Havana, leaving responsibility with Ramalho, who continued with it until 1882. Articles in As Farpas were initially highly critical and ironic. They satirized the partisan journalism of the press; the economic, cultural, social and moral aspects of the so-called Regeneration period in the country; religion and the Catholic faith; the segregation of the social role of women; and romantic literature. For Portugal, As Farpas represented a new and innovative concept of journalism, one of ideas and social and cultural criticism. They provided an excellent sociological observation of day-to-day life in Portugal. For example, observations were made of markets and prisons and in administration offices. The authors observed fishermen at work and at home, families in church, people at the theatre and journalists in the newsrooms. Articles considered adultery, clerical life, economic decay, and political and cultural degradation, themes that would later be developed in the novels of Eça de Queirós.

However, Eça's opinion about this work was not very positive. He said that they were “a collection of aged pimps that are not worth the paper on which they are printed” and described them as just a “huge laugh”. After his departure, the magazine under Ramalho Ortigão took on more of a pedagogical and moralizing tone, lacking the biting caricature provided by Eça de Queirós.

From 1887 to 1890 the articles by Ramalho were reprinted in eleven volumes. This was arguably the first literary work made from the condensation of journalistic articles, previously published in a newspaper or magazine, something that became common in the 20th Century. The texts written by Eça were assembled in two volumes in 1890 with the title Uma Campanha Alegre (A Cheerful Campaign).
