= Teolinda Gersão =

Portuguese writer (born 1940)

Teolinda Gersão (born 1940) is a Portuguese writer.

Born in Coimbra, she studied at the universities of Coimbra, Tübingen and Berlin. She also taught at Technische Universität Berlin, Lisbon University, and the Universidade de Lisboa, among others. A full-time writer since the mid-1990s, Gersao is the author of more than a dozen books. She has won several literary prizes for her work. Her novel The Word Tree set in colonial Mozambique, was translated into English by Margaret Jull Costa.
