= Ramalho Ortigão =

Portuguese writer (1836–1915)

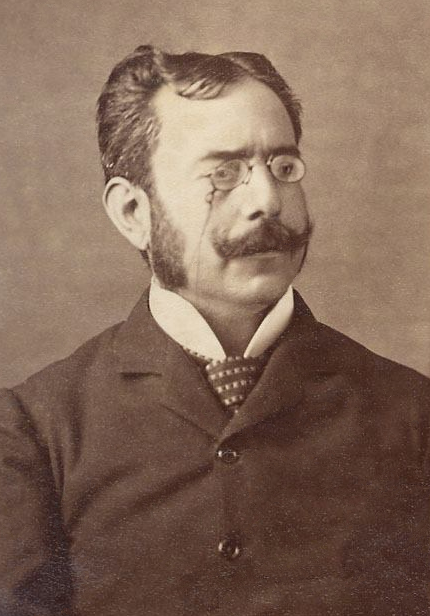
- Born: José Duarte Ramalho Ortigão; 24 November 1836; Porto, Portugal
- Died: 27 September 1915 (aged 78); Lisbon, Portugal
- Occupation: Writer
- Writing career
- Notable works: O Mistério da Estrada de Sintra, As Farpas
- Literary movement: Romanticism

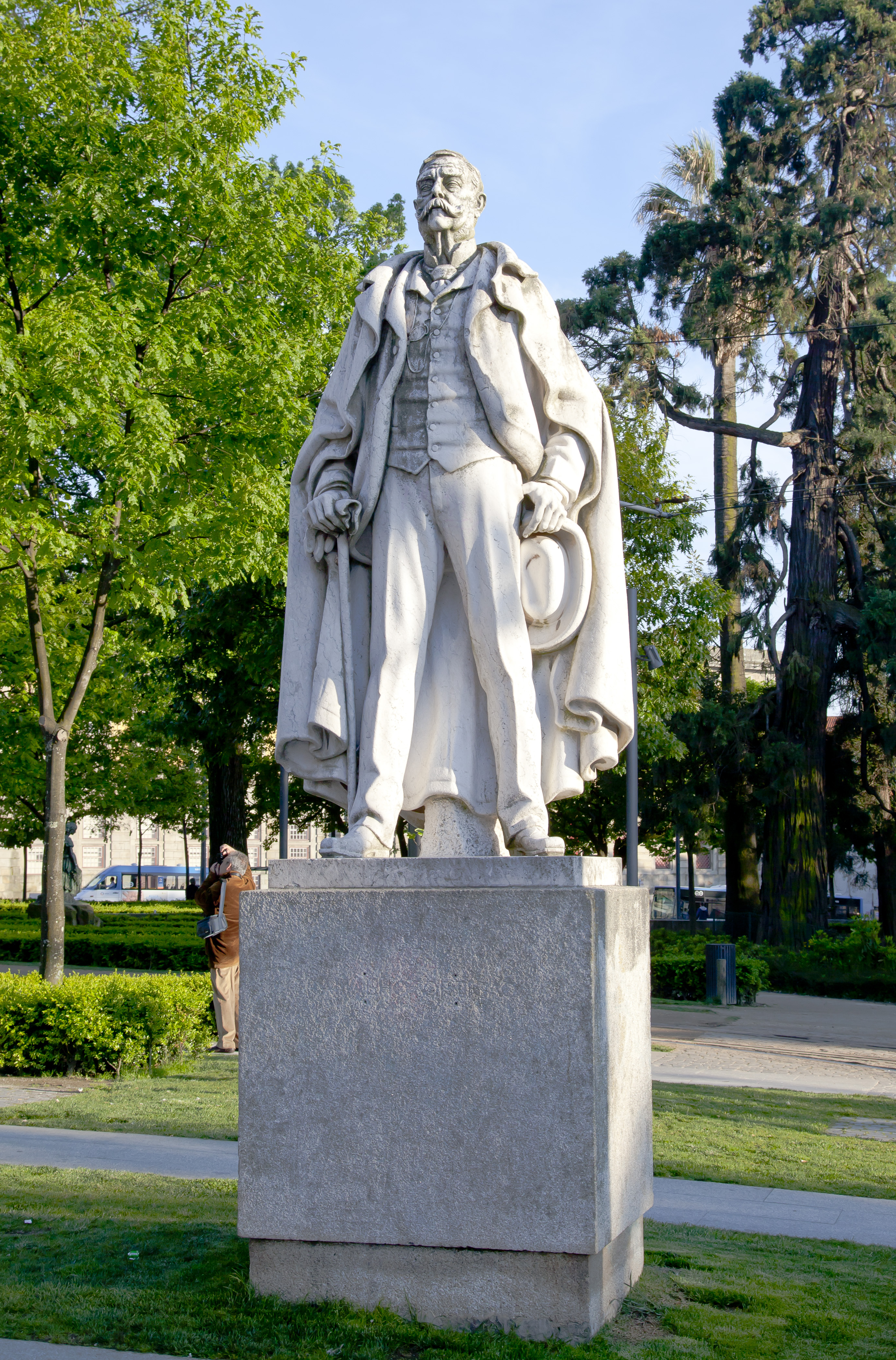
Sculpture of Ramalho Ortigão in the Cordoaria Garden, Porto.

José Duarte Ramalho Ortigão (Portuguese pronunciation: [ʒuˈzɛ ˈðwaɾtɨ ʁɐˈmaʎu oɾtiˈɣɐ̃w]) (24 November 1836 – 27 September 1915) was a Portuguese writer of the late 19th century and early 20th century.

== Biography ==
Ortigão spent his early years with his maternal grandmother in Porto. He studied law in the University of Coimbra but he did not complete his studies. After returning to his home town, he taught French at a college run by his father. Among his students was Eça de Queiroz.

In 1862 he dedicated himself to journalism and became a literary critic at the Diário do Porto and contributed to several literary magazines.

At this period Romanticism was the dominant trend in Portuguese literature, led by several major writers including Camilo Castelo Branco and António Augusto Soares de Passos, who influenced Ortigão. In the 1870s, a group of students from Coimbra began to promote new ideas in a reaction against romanticism. This group, eventually called the 70s Generation, was to have a major influence on Portuguese literature. As a supporter of romanticism, Ortigão became involved in a struggle against them and even fought a duel with Antero de Quental. In spite of this early opposition he afterwards became friendly with some members of the group. It was at this period that he wrote The Mystery of the Sintra Road and created the satirical journal As Farpas, both in collaboration with Eça de Queiroz. When Queiroz became a diplomat, initially in Cuba, Ortigão continued As Farpas alone.

Ortigão also worked as a translator. In 1874 he produced a Portuguese translation of the English satirical novel Ginx's Baby by Edward Jenkins.

Ramalho Ortigão died in Lisbon on 27 September 1915.

== Works ==
- Literatura de Hoje (1866).
- Em Paris (1868).
- Contos Côr de Rosa (1869).
- O Mistério da Estrada de Sintra (1870).
- Biographia de Emilia Adelaide Pimentel (1871).
- As Farpas (with Eça de Queirós, 1871–72).
- As Farpas (1871–1882).
- Banhos de Caldas e Águas Minerais (1875).
- As Praias de Portugal (1876).
- Notas de Viagem (1878).
- A Instrucção Secundária na Câmara dos Senhores Deputados (1883).
- A Holanda (1883).
- John Bull (1887).
- O Culto da Arte em Portugal (1896).
- Últimas Farpas (1914).

Posthumous

- As Farpas Esquecidas (1946–47).

Translations

- Hygiene da Alma, by Ernst, Baron von Feuchtersleben (1873).
- Ginx's Baby, o Engeitado: seu Nascimento e Mais Desastres, by Edward Jenkins (1874).
- O Marquez de Villemer, by George Sand (1905).
