= The Relic (Queiroz novel) =

Novel by the Portuguese writer José Maria de Eça de Queirós

- Cover of the 2003 English-language version
- Author: José Maria de Eça de Queirós
- Original title: A Relíquia
- Translator: Margaret Jull Costa
- Cover artist: David Bird/Carlos Botelho
- Language: Portuguese
- Series: Dedalus European Classics
- Genre: realist style
- Publisher: Dedalus
- Publication date: 1887
- Publication place: Portugal
- English publication date: 1994
- ISBN: 0946626944

The Relic (Portuguese: A Relíquia) is a novel written by the Portuguese writer José Maria de Eça de Queirós (1845-1900) and published in 1887. The most recent English translation, by Margaret Jull Costa, was first published in 1994, together with an Introduction by the translator.

== Background ==
Eça de Queirós began work on The Relic in 1880. The book, containing many sacrilegious passages, with wry, ironic humour, was first published in 1887 in serial form in the Gazeta de Notícias of Rio de Janeiro and in book form shortly thereafter. The epigraph to the novel reads “Sobre a nudez da Verdade o manto diáfano da Fantasia” (Over the sturdy nakedness of truth, the diaphanous cloak of fantasy). These were the words engraved on the author's statue erected in Lisbon in 1903. The statue shows the author embracing “Truth”, a naked woman partly covered by a diaphanous cloth.

== The novel ==
The Relic is narrated in the first person by the central character, Teodorico Raposo, an orphan at the age of seven, who is entrusted to the care of his aunt, Dona Patrocínia das Neves, who is very wealthy but obsessively devout. She expects Teodorico to live up to her pious and conservative standards. Teodorico realises that it's a good idea to stay in his aunt's good books with the hope of eventually inheriting her fortune, which she has planned to leave to the Church. As he gets older he becomes adept at organizing a double life; appearing obsessively devout to his aunt while leading a debauched life of drinking and meeting with Lisbon's prostitutes when out of her sight.

Having learnt of the libertinism of Paris from a friend he has a great urge to travel there, but his aunt does not approve. Instead she agrees to send him to the Holy Land. All she asks is that he brings back a relic and he believes that if he accomplishes this then he'll be made her heir. Early on in the trip he finds a German travelling companion, the pedantic and parsimonious German academic Dr. Topsius, and in Alexandria has an entanglement with a British prostitute, who gives him her nightgown as a keepsake.

A long, sudden and unexplained section in the middle of the novel is in the form of an apparent dream in which Teodorico is transported back to the time of Jesus's arrest, trial and execution, where he and Topsius become witnesses to history. This section has been criticised by some reviewers as fantastic rather than realistic, as very flat with a different tone from the rest of the book, as not really fitting in with or contributing to the rest of the story and as being written in the language of the author rather than that displayed by Teodorico in the rest of the novel.

Having been unable to find a really convincing relic, Teodorico had decided to fake one. He has made for him a crown of thorns, planning to offer it to his aunt as the crown that Jesus wore. Unfortunately a mix-up results in the aunt receiving something entirely unwelcome and she evicts him, penniless, from her home. The mix-up is never satisfactorily explained in the novel and could be the result of a simple accident, a deliberate act or God's punishment for Teodorico's hypocrisy. He eventually renounces hypocrisy in favour of complete honesty, and as a consequence ends up living a comfortable life, although the novel ends with his conclusion that things could have turned out even better if he had been quick enough to think of a convincing lie to explain the mix-up to his aunt. In her Introduction to the novel, its translator argues that this conclusion gives relevance to the earlier dream sequence, in which Teodorico discovers that the Resurrection of Jesus was a lie that created the foundations of Christianity. It was the book's rejection of any moral focus and the "rewriting of Christianity as a myth based on a well-intentioned lie" that inevitably led to criticism in Portugal when it was first published.

After being thrown out by his aunt, Teodorico survives for a few months by the selling of the other fake relics he had brought home, such as cigar-holders made out of a piece of wood from Noah's ark; straw from the crib of Jesus; a piece of wood planed by Saint Joseph; a fragment of the water jug with which the Virgin used to go to the fountain; a shoe from the donkey on which the Holy Family had fled into Egypt; and a rusty nail from Noah's Ark. Working through a priest as a middleman, Teodorico ends up selling as many as fourteen authenticated horseshoes and seventy-five nails.

== Modern criticism ==
Teodorico is an entertaining figure, who for much of the novel tries to outdo his aunt in her piety in the hope of a large inheritance. The aunt is a not entirely unbelievable caricature, which produces some fine comic moments, although ultimately the novel as a whole is not one of the author's best. Even so, The Relic has been described as “a provocative, critical account of the hypocrisy of the Catholic Church of Queirós' time.” It portrays “religious fervour, contrasting the gentleness of Jesus against the ruthless of the Church's God”. Another reviewer notes that it shares with other novels by Eça “sharp satire and criticism of the backwardness and hypocrisy that pervaded Portuguese society” of the time.
