= Greenwich Playhouse =

- On opening: Greenwich Studio Theatre; 1995: The Prince Theatre
- Interactive map of Greenwich Playhouse
- Address: Greenwich High Road; Greenwich, London
- Coordinates: 51.478106°N 0.014903°W
- Capacity: 84 seated
- Type: Studio theatre

Construction
- Opened: 1990
- Closed: 2012

The Greenwich Playhouse was an 84-seat studio theatre in the central Greenwich district of the Royal Borough of Greenwich which opened in 1990 and closed in 2012.

It was situated above and had its entrance within the St. Christopher's Inn pub, situated on the east side of the forecourt of Greenwich station.

In January 2012 the Greenwich Playhouse's closure as a producing theatre was again announced, coming into effect in April 2012.

== See also ==
- Greenwich Theatre - a proscenium style theatre also in Greenwich.
