= Hélia Correia =

Portuguese novelist, playwright, poet and translator (born 1949)

Hélia Correia (born 1949) is a Portuguese novelist, playwright, poet and translator.

== Early life ==
Correia was born in Lisbon in February 1949, and raised in Mafra, her mother's home town. Her father was an anti-fascist who was arrested before her birth by the Salazar regime.

At the University of Lisbon, she studied Romance Philology. During these years, she began publishing poetry in literary supplements of the time, such as the Juvenil do Diário de Lisboa under the aegis of Mário Castrim.

== Career ==
After a period working as a high school teacher, Hélia Correia undertook postgraduate studies in Classical Theatre.

Her literary career started in earnest in the 1981 with the publication of her debut work titled O Separar das Águas. She quickly achieved great commercial success and critical renown, with critics lauding her innovative writing which remained linked to the best literary traditions. They saw influences of Camilo Castelo Branco and Emily Brontë, as well as connections to ancient Greek drama.

Several of her novels, including O Número dos Vivos (1982) and Montedemo (1983), could be considered works of magical realism. Correia accepted this saying she could not ignore the importance of South American magical realism.

Some critics have noted that her earlier works were influenced by French Feminist thought. Maria Teresa Horta has described Correia's works as "visceral" and "primordial".

From the 1990s, she began to create theatrical works. She reinterpreted ancient Greek myths from the view point of female heroines, such as Antigone in Perdition, Helen of Troy in Hatred, and Medea in Boundless.

In 2001, her most popular book, Lillias Fraser, appeared, set between 1746 and 1762 and ranging across Scotland and Portugal, covering the earthquake of Lisbon. The book won the Portuguese PEN Club prize.

== Works ==
=== Fiction ===
- 1981 – O Separar das Águas
- 1982 – O Número dos Vivos
- 1983 – Montedemo
- 1985 – Villa Celeste
- 1987 – Soma
- 1988 – A Fenda Erótica
- 1991 – A Casa Eterna
- 1996 – Insânia
- 2001 – Lillias Fraser
- 2001 – Antartida de mil folhas
- 2002 – Apodera-te de mim
- 2008 – Contos
- 2014 – Vinte degraus e outros contos

=== Poetry ===
- 1986 – A Pequena Morte / Esse Eterno Canto
- 2012 – A Terceira Miséria

=== Theatre ===
- 1991 – Perdição, Exercício sobre Antígona
- 1991 – Florbela
- 2000 – O Rancor, Exercício sobre Helena
- 2005 – O Segredo de Chantel
- 2008 – A Ilha Encantada

=== For children ===
- 1988 – A Luz de Newton (seven stories about colours)

== Awards and honors ==
- 2001 Portuguese PEN Club prize - for Lillias Fraser
- 2006 Prémio Máxima de Literatura - for Bastardia
- 2010 Prémio da Fundação Inês de Castro - for Adoecer
- 2012 Casino da Póvoa prize - for her poetry collection A Terceira Miséria
- 2013 Vergílio Ferreira Prize - for her entire oeuvre, awarded by the University of Évora
- 2013 Prémio Literário Correntes d'Escritas - for A Terceira Miséria, a tribute to Greece.
- 2015 Grand Prize Camilo Castelo Branco - for 20 Degraus e Outros Contos.
- 2015 Camões Prize
