= Cousin Bazilio =

Novel written by the Portuguese writer José Maria de Eça de Queiroz

- Cover of the 2016 Dedalus European Classics edition
- Author: José Maria de Eça de Queiroz
- Original title: O Primo Basílio
- Translator: Mary Jane Serrano, Roy Campbell, Margaret Jull Costa
- Cover artist: Paula Rego
- Language: Portuguese
- Publication date: 1878
- Publication place: Portugal
- English publication date: 1889, 1953, 2003
- ISBN: 0-8371-3089-1

O Primo Basílio ("Cousin Bazilio") is one of the realist novels of the Portuguese author José Maria de Eça de Queiroz, also known under the modernized spelling of Eça de Queirós. He worked in the Portuguese consular service, stationed at 53 Grey Street, Newcastle upon Tyne, from late 1874 to April 1879. The novel was written during this productive period in his career, first appearing in 1878.

This was the only novel by Eça de Queiroz to be translated from Portuguese during his lifetime. A bowdlerized translation of this book by Mary Jane Serrano under the title Dragon's Teeth: A Novel was published in the United States in 1889, still available as a print-on-demand title. Further translations have since been published, first in 1953 by the poet Roy Campbell and then in 2003 by Margaret Jull Costa.

== Plot ==
Jorge, an engineer and Luiza, a bored, bourgeois housewife, live a happy but unexciting life in the Lisbon society of the 19th century. To her husband's annoyance, Luiza still maintains a friendship with Leopoldina, known for her immorality and adultery. Problems begin when Jorge needs to travel to work in the Alentejo region of Portugal. Almost immediately after his departure her affluent cousin and former lover, Bazilio, returns to Lisbon after a seven-year absence. After seducing her in her living room, he arranges a cheap room where they can meet regularly.

The relationship does not last long as Bazilio loses interest in Luiza after his conquest. He does not honour his promise to run away with her. Unfortunately, Luiza's maid, Juliana, intercepts the couples' love letters and starts to blackmail her mistress, doing less work, and demanding better food, gifts of Luiza's clothes and the sacking of the other servant in the house. When Jorge returns to Lisbon, he becomes aware of the increasing arrogance of Juliana and demands that she be sacked. In a final attempt to save herself, Luiza confesses to Jorge's friend Sebastian. He takes a policeman to the house to frighten Juliana, causing her to have a fatal heart attack.

Jorge intercepts a letter to Luiza from Bazilio and confronts his wife with it. She faints, becomes delirious, falls into a coma, and dies. When Bazilio returns to Lisbon and learns of her death, his only regret is that he has not brought his French mistress with him.

Eça also describes a range of other characters, including the promiscuous Leopoldina; Tía Vítoria, who can procure young girls for older men; Joana the cook, who has an affair with a tubercular carpenter; and Dona Felicidade who suffers from wind and has an unrequited passion for Acacio, who lives with his much younger housekeeper, who is, in turn having an affair with someone else.

== Criticism ==
Cousin Bazilio was criticized for its similarity to the plot of Madame Bovary by Gustave Flaubert, first published in 1857. The Brazilian novelist Machado de Assis, argued that the plot was unconvincing and complained about the sensational sexuality. The convenient arrival of Bazilio after the departure of Jorge, Juliana's ability to steal the love letters and Jorge's later interception of Bazilio's letter certainly seem contrived, as does the death of Luiza, who did not suffer from any illness. Machado de Assis also condemned Eça for allowing a servant to dominate the second half of the novel.

== TV and film adaptations ==
1922 adaption without English subtitles

The first film adaptation of a work of Queiroz was a 1922 adaptation of Cousin Bazilio by George Pallu, and the work has been adapted to film five more times, including a 1959 Portuguese film, a 1935 Mexican film, the 1977 Spanish film Dios bendiga cada rincón de esta casa, and a 1969 West German film. In a 2007 Brazilian adaptation titled Primo Basílio produced/directed by Daniel Filho, with Fábio Assunção in the role of Basílio, and Débora Falabella as Luiza, Reynaldo Gianecchini as Jorge and Glória Pires as Juliana, the action was moved from 19th century Lisbon to São Paulo of the 1950s around the time of the construction of Brasília.

In 1988 the Brazilian company Rede Globo produced a television adaptation of O Primo Basílio in 16 episodes, starring Giulia Gam, Marcos Paulo and Tony Ramos.
