= Maria Judite de Carvalho =

Portuguese author (1921 - 1998)

Maria Judite de Carvalho (18 September 1921 in Lisbon – 18 January 1998) was a Portuguese author. She was married to Urbano Tavares Rodrigues (1923–2013).

== Works ==
- Tanta Gente, Mariana (contos), Lisboa: Europa América, 1988.
- As Palavras Poupadas (contos), Lisboa: Europa América, 1988. (Prémio Camilo Castelo Branco).
- Paisagem sem Barcos (contos), Lisboa: Europa América, 1990.
- Os Armários Vazios (romance), Lisboa: Livraria Bertrand, 1978.
- O Seu Amor por Etel (novela), Lisboa: Movimento, 1967.
- Flores ao Telefone (contos), Lisboa: Portugália Editora, 1968.
- Os Idólatras (contos), Lisboa: Prelo Editora, 1969.
- Tempo de Mercês (contos), Lisboa: Seara Nova, 1973.
- A Janela Fingida (crónicas), Lisboa: Seara Nova, 1975.
- O Homem no Arame (crónicas), Amadora: Editorial Bertrand, 1979.
- Além do Quadro (contos), Lisboa: O Jornal, 1983.
- Este Tempo (crónicas) Lisboa: Editorial Caminho, 1991.(Prémio da Crónica da Associação Portuguesa de Escritores).
- Seta Despedida (contos), Lisboa: Europa América, 1995.(Prémio Máxima, Prémio da Associação Internacional dos Críticos Literário, pt:Grande Prémio de Conto Camilo Castelo Branco, Prémio Vergílio Ferreira das Universidades Portuguesas).
- A Flor Que Havia na Água Parada (poemas), Lisboa: Europa América, 1998 (póstumo).
- Havemos de Rir! (teatro), Lisboa: Europa América, 1998 (póstumo).
