= Dedalus Books =

British publishing company

- Founded: 30 November 1983
- Country of origin: United Kingdom
- Headquarters location: Sawtry, Cambridgeshire
- Distribution: Central Books (UK); SCB Distributors (US); Peribo (Australia)
- Publication types: Books
- Official website: www.dedalusbooks.com

Dedalus Books is an independent publishing company based in Cambridgeshire, England. Publisher Eric Lane has said, "We like the bizarre, the grotesque, the surreal and the clever, preferably in the same book. We call this kind of book, distorted reality. For instance David Madsen's Memoirs of a Gnostic Dwarf, Sylvie Germain's The Book of Night and Vladimir Sharov's Before and During. Three perfect examples of what we are looking for." Prize-winning Dedalus writers have included novelist Andrew Crumey and translator Margaret Jull Costa.

Established by Geoffrey Smith, Eric Lane and Robert Irwin, Dedalus was launched on 30 November 1983 with the publication of three novels including Irwin's The Arabian Nightmare and Smith's vampire novel The Revenants (bylined "Geoffrey Farrington").

As well as English-language literature, Dedalus publishes world literature in translation. It brought acclaimed European writers Sylvie Germain and Herbert Rosendorfer into English for the first time. African writers have included Najwa Binshatwan and Dina Salústio. Dedalus also publishes classic literature by authors including J.-K. Huysmans and Octave Mirbeau, and has published several anthologies of fantastic literature.

Dedalus is partially funded by the Arts Council of England. When funding was withdrawn in 2010, Dedalus launched a petition whose signatories included J. M. Coetzee and Jonathan Coe, and the Arts Council relented, granting £26,900 for "the commissioning and publishing costs of new literary fiction in translation and the origination of new English fiction".

Michael Dirda has praised Dedalus' output, describing them as "the premier publisher of decadent, turn-of-the-last--century European fiction" and stating "there are superb Dedalus anthologies of Portuguese and Polish fantasy".

Dedalus Books is not to be confused with the Irish imprint Dedalus Press (founded 1985), which publishes contemporary Irish poetry and poetry from around the world in English translation.

== See also ==
- The Dark Domain, a 1995 book by that press
