= The Cumnor Affair =

2008 one-act opera

The Cumnor Affair or An Elizabethan Murder-Mystery is a one-act opera by the English composer Philip Cashian with an English-language libretto by Iain Pears, lasting 75 minutes in performance. The opera is based on the love affair between Robert Dudley, Amy Robsart, and Elizabeth I of England. The sudden death of Robsart led to speculation that she was murdered.

== Background ==
The work was composed in 2008 and premiered on 10 November that year by the Tête à Tête opera company at the Riverside Studios in London, England, conducted by Tim Murray. The premiere was directed by Bill Bankes-Jones with set design by Tim Meacock and light design by Mark Doubleday.

== Characters ==
- Lord Cecil: Robert Gildon (2008 Premiere)
- Queen Elizabeth I: Sibylla Meienberg (2008 Premiere)
- Amy Cumnor (Amy Robsart): Amy Carson (2008 Premiere)

== Reviews ==
According to Ash Smyth of the Oxford Mail, the singing was lackluster and the absence of melody was a jarring error. As Smyth notes, "It is basically without melody, which was bad enough when competing with the singers, and worse when not." Rupert Christiansen of The Telegraph supported the company but noted the failure of the production, "this isn't one of their more successful ventures"

== Instrumentation ==
The opera is scored for seven voices and ten instrumentalists:

- Flute
- Alto Flute
- Piccolo
- Clarinet
- E♭ Clarinet
- Bass Clarinet
- French Horn
- Percussion
- Violin
- Cello
- Double Bass

== Links ==
- Ferraro Jr., Mario (2011). Contemporary opera in Britain, 1970-2010. (Unpublished Doctoral thesis, City University London)
- Matveeva, Anna Anatolyevna., (2021). Semantic And Formal Characteristics Of Precedent Statements Functioning In The Discourse Of The British Media. Philological Sciences. Questions of theory and practice.
