= Decentraland =

3D virtual world with cryptocurrency elements

- Original authors: Ariel Meilich, Esteban Ordano
- Developer: Decentraland Foundation
- Release: February 20, 2020; 6 years ago
- Written in: C#, GLSL, and HTML
- Engine: Three.js (−2018); Babylon.js (2018–2019); Unity (2019–)
- Available in: English (official)
- Type: Virtual world
- License: Apache-2.0
- Website: decentraland.org

Decentraland is a 3D virtual world platform. Users may buy virtual plots of land in the platform as NFTs via the MANA cryptocurrency, which uses the Ethereum blockchain. Designers can create and sell clothes and accessories for the avatars to be used in the virtual world.

It was opened to the public in February 2020 as a browser-based platform and is overseen by the nonprofit Decentraland Foundation. In 2017, the platform raised $26 million in its initial coin offering (ICO); by 2022 indy100 reported that it had a $1.2 billion market evaluation. While DappRadar found that as few as 38 users performed currency transactions in a single day, Decentraland claimed that 8,000 people per day used the platform in 2022.

Decentraland has received widespread criticism by technology and video game journalists for its technical bugs and mostly empty virtual world.

== History ==
Decentraland was created by Argentine developers Ari Meilich and Esteban Ordano, and has been in development since 2015. When it launched in 2017, parcels of digital land sold for about $20, and mana tokens sold for $0.02. The game's first map, Genesis City, was made up of 90,601 parcels of land. It raised $26 million in its initial coin offering (ICO) in 2017.

In April 2021, during a surge in popularity for NFTs, parcels sold for between $6,000 and $100,000. Because of the relatively small pool of mana, the currency is volatile, spiking to as high as $5.79 after events like Facebook's rebrand to Meta.

In November 2021 a virtual real-estate company purchased a plot of land in Decentraland for $2.43 million.

Users have minted NFTs of avatars with slurs in their names, and at one point the name "Jew" was for sale for $362,000. In November 2021 the community held a vote on whether to add "Hitler" to the banned names list, but there were not enough votes for the decentralized autonomous organization's (DAO) smart contract to execute.

In late 2021 and early 2022, brands which appeared in Decentraland included Samsung, Adidas, Atari, PricewaterhouseCoopers and Miller Lite. Sotheby's held its first metaverse auction, and in March 2022, Decentraland hosted Metaverse Fashion Week in which fashion brands appeared, including Dolce & Gabbana, Tommy Hilfiger, Elie Saab, Nicholas Kirkwood, Perry Ellis, Imitation of Christ, and Estée Lauder. Music artists including Deadmau5 and Grimes held concerts in the platform.

In October 2022, indy100 reported that Decentraland had a market valuation of $1.2 billion.

In October 2022 the DappRadar tracking site reported that the Decentraland platform was seeing fewer than 1,000 users performing currency transactions on the site each day, with one particular 24-hour period having only 38 such users. Decentraland later claimed that "active users" were only users that had unique blockchain wallet addresses that interact with its system, and that users that did not have wallet addresses weren't counted. In a tweet, Decentraland, said by their own metrics the platform was used by an average of 8,000 people per day. The Verge compared this number unfavorably with the 2009 PC game Left 4 Dead 2, which had 18,000 active users playing the game at one point during the same month.

In 2023, composer Alastair White created the world's first opera in the metaverse for Decentraland's Metaverse Fashion Week. #CAPITAL premiered in a digital opera house designed especially by Sybarite Architects; hailed as “an impressive Gesamtkunstwerk [which] shows all that the future will make possible” (Schön Magazine), it was shortlisted for The Stage Awards and an Ivan Juritz Prize.

In October 2024 Decentraland launched a beta version of Decentraland 2.0, a desktop client for the platform featuring additional quests and minigames.

== Reception ==
In March 2020, Luke Winkie, writing for PC Gamer, described the game as "rickety", noting numerous bugs and the game's "brutally long loading times", as well as hard-locks related to the game's cryptocurrency-based authentication process. Winkie described the platform as having a strongly libertarian political bent, saying "Decentraland is a truly fascinating concept. It peels back like an onion, revealing a Randian fever-dream built with Roblox textures".

According to Eric Ravenscraft of Wired, activity on the platform is unclear, with the world mostly empty and with a number of concurrent users of around 1,600 in 2021, a figure that might include inactive users who remain logged on. Ravenscraft wrote that Decentraland was buggy with poor moderation, and said that it felt reminiscent of an early access game.

In January 2022, a video clip of a rave in Decentraland was posted to Twitter by DJ Alex Moss. The clip went viral and was widely mocked on social media. Zack Zwiezen, writing for Kotaku, unfavorably compared the clip to similar virtual concerts and parties in AdventureQuest 3D, Fortnite, Roblox, and VRChat, and described the look of the game itself as similar to “a fictional game that was tossed together in a few hours for an episode of CSI: Whatever City, in which the investigators are trying to solve a murder that involves some 'new' and 'popular' online world." Prompted by the clip, Jason Koebler of Vice investigated other raves held on the platform, and described the experience as mostly empty and plagued by technical bugs.

In January 2022, Zachariah Kelly, writing for Gizmodo, reviewed a virtual version of Melbourne Park created in Decentraland to promote the Australian Open. Kelly praised the 3D models created for the project, as well as the platform's ability to run in a browser, but poor draw distance and other issues made it feel "clunky" and lacking in activity. Kelly was also skeptical of the necessity for blockchain and NFTs. Kelly revisited Decentraland's Australian Open space several days later, to review the closing concert. He said his experience was plagued by technical issues, and that footage of the event taken by others were unfavorably compared to online concerts held on other platforms, such as Fortnite.

In April 2022, Business Insider review, Lisa Han praised the world's architecture and minigames, though criticized the emptiness of the world and its glitches and technical issues along with the game's removal of a quest log feature and the limitations of user interaction with Decentraland's architecture.

== See also ==
- Metaverse
- Line Goes Up – The Problem With NFTs
