= Laura Åkerlund =

Opera stage director

- Born: 1987 (age 38–39); Helsinki, Finland
- Education: Master's degree in Musicology (Helsinki University), Opera Stage Directing (Sibelius-Academy), Theater Studies (Freie Universität Berlin), Management and International Business (Aalto University)
- Occupations: Opera stage director, Pianist
- Known for: Finalist for Directrice Générale at Opéra de Lyon (2019), Finalist for Directrice Générale at Opéra National de Bordeaux (2021), Founder and Director of Comic Opera Helsinki: Himmerrä ja Valo (Musica Nova Helsinki, 2011); Aallonharjalla (Malmitalo, Helsinki, 2011); La Traviata (Putikon Hovi, 2015); Eugen Onegin (St. Petersburg and Punkaharju, Finland, 2015); Halka (Helsinki Opera Festival, 2018); The Red Line (Kemi City Orchestra, 2018)
- Awards: Best stage direction, best-leading performance (La Traviata, 2015)

Laura Åkerlund (born 1987 in Helsinki, Finland) is a Finnish opera-stage director and pianist. In 2019, she was a finalist for the position of ''Directrice Générale'' at the Opéra de Lyon, and in 2021, she advanced to the final stages of selection for the same role at the Opéra National de Bordeaux.

== Biography ==
Åkerlund began piano lessons at the age of six and completed her studies privately at the Helsinki Conservatory. She earned a Master of Musicology degree from the University of Helsinki, and later studied opera stage directing at the Sibelius Academy, theater studies at the Freie Universität Berlin, and management and international business at Aalto University. She is fluent in Finnish, English, Swedish, German, and French.

In 2017, she founded Helsingin Koominen Ooppera (Comic Opera Helsinki), Finland's newest opera house, inspired by the traditions of Paris's Opéra Comique and Berlin's Komische Oper. The institution aims to broaden opera's accessibility through experimental performances staged in unconventional venues. Under her direction, Comic Opera Helsinki premiered Finland's first immersive opera, Vixen (a reimagining of Janáček's The Cunning Little Vixen), in collaboration with Silent Opera and the Helsinki Festival. The production took place in a historic train station.

== Productions ==
=== As stage director ===
- 2011 – Heta Aho: Himmerrä ja Valo, Musica Nova Helsinki.
- 2011 – Musical: Aallonharjalla, Malmitalo, Helsinki.
- 2015 – Verdi: La Traviata, 3rd International Music Festival Putikon Hovi (winner: Best Stage Direction, Best Leading Performance).
- 2015 – Tchaikovsky: Eugen Onegin, St. Petersburg and Punkaharju Finland.
- 2018 – Moniuszko: Halka, Helsinki Opera Festival, Comic Opera Helsinki.
- 2018 – Sallinen: The Red Line, Kemi City Orchestra.

=== As assistant stage director and stage manager ===
- 2006 – Haydn: L’Isola disabitata, Finnish Chamber Opera (assistant stage director and stage manager).
- 2006 – Sallinen: The Red Line; Pacius: Kung Karls Jakt; Tchaikovsky: Eugene Onegin (stage director trainee, Finnish National Opera).
- 2007 – Kuusisto: Risto Ryti - vapauden vanki (production assistant, Finnish Chamber Opera).
- 2007 – Pohjola: Kaksi kamarioopperaa rakkaudesta (assistant stage director, stage manager; Helsinki Festival & Turku Music Festival).
- 2008 – Händel: Acis and Galatea, Finnish Chamber Opera (assistant stage director and stage manager; stage director Vilppu Kiljunen).
- 2009 – Haydn: Il mondo della luna, Kulttuuritalo Gloria (assistant stage director; stage director Ville Saukkonen).
- 2009 – Holst: The Planets (stage manager, video art coordinator; Helsinki Festival, Helsinki Philharmonic Orchestra; conductor John Storgårds; video artist Petri Ruikka).
- 2012 – Wagner: Tristan und Isolde (assistant stage manager; Helsinki Festival, Baltic Sea Festival Stockholm; Radio Symphony Orchestra Helsinki; conductor Esa-Pekka Salonen; stage director Peter Sellars).
- 2013 – Mozart: Don Giovanni (assistant stage director and stage manager; New Generation Opera, Helsinki Festival; stage director Erik Söderblom).
- 2013 – Hyytiäinen: La Figure de la Terre (assistant stage director and stage manager; Sophiensaele, Berlin; stage director Jaakko Nousiainen).
- 2014 – Hyytiäinen: Aikainen 3D Opera (Grimeborn Festival London; stage director Jaakko Nousiainen).
- 2014 – Bertelsmeier: Querelle (Deutsche Oper Berlin; stage director Tilman Hecker).
- 2015 – Strauss: Salome (stage director Kirill Serebrennikov; Stuttgart Opera); Ayres: Peter Pan.
- 2015 – Pohjola: Harrbådan neito; Sibelius: Neito tornissa (assistant stage director and stage manager; stage director Aku-Petteri Pahkamäki; West Coast Kokkola Opera).
- 2015 – Puccini: Gianni Schicchi; Bartók: Bluebeard's Castle (Komische Oper Berlin; stage director Calixto Bieito).
- 2016 – Wagner: Die Meistersinger von Nürnberg (stage director David Bösch); Halévy: La Juive (stage director Calixto Bieito; Bavarian State Opera).
- 2016 – Hoffmann: Ahti Karjalainen: elämä, Kekkonen ja teot (reprise direction; stage director Juha Hurme; West Coast Kokkola Opera).

== TV work ==
- 2008 – Risto Ryti - vapauden vanki (DVD studio recording of the Finnish Chamber Opera production; directed by Ilkka Kuusisto).
- 2009 – Talo Ranskassa (French-language educational series; produced by YLE Teema).

== Other work ==
- 2018 – Badisches Staatstheater Karlsruhe: Wagnerstimmen Singing Competition Final (member of the jury).
- 2018 – Kyiv, Ukraine: Theaterfestival GRA (competition; member of the jury).
- 2019–2020 – Badisches Staatstheater Karlsruhe: Executive team member and head of dramaturgy.
- 2020–2023 – Theater Dortmund, Academy for Theatre and Digitality (member of the jury).
