= Alastair White =

Scottish-New Zealand composer and writer (born 1988)

Alastair White (born 1988) is a Scottish-New Zealand composer and writer. His work is characterised by a lyrical complexity that has been described as an attempt "to challenge long-held assumptions about the material world and to illuminate the performative nature of matter itself" (Opera Today).

== Operas ==
The fashion-opera cycle was created between 2018 and 2021. Combining fashion, dance, drama, poetry and music in what White calls "contingent dialectics", it was described by BBC Radio 3 as "a whole exciting new genre of art".

In 2018, WEAR premiered at Tete-a-Tete. An immersive performance at The Crossing, King's Cross, London, it incorporated dance and fashion to explore the role of objects in changing perceptions of space and time. It was shortlisted for a Scottish Award for New Music, and revived by Opera in the City at the Bridewell Theatre the following year.

These ideas were developed in 2019's ROBE, an opera that dealt with themes of artificial intelligence, virtual reality and cartography. It premiered at The Place and was nominated for a Creative Edinburgh Award. It was released by Métier Records in February, 2021.

His third fashion-opera WOAD premiered in 2021, adapting the Scots border ballad of Tam Lin to imagine the implications of multiverse theory. The Métier release was described by Fanfare as "the height of compositional magnificence".

The fourth, RUNE, premiered later that year at the Round Chapel and was released in the summer of 2022. Scored for three pianos, two singers and four dancers, the work was a collaboration with London-based brand KA WA KEY. Vogue Italia called it "a perfect combination of show and costume," while Forum Opera described the release as "a new artistic form, more total, more immersive, rich in meaning and connection".

Beyond the cycle, Hareflight premiered at the start of 2022 at the Leicester Guildhall, drawing influence from Tiepolo's The Discovery of the True Cross to discuss the relationship between truth and knowledge, "proposing an aesthetic of the thought or dance which moves faster than its crystallisation into sentence or gesture".

In 2023, White created the world's first opera in the metaverse. #CAPITAL premiered as part of Metaverse Fashion Week in a digital opera house designed especially by Sybarite Architects. Hailed as "an impressive Gesamtkunstwerk [which] shows all that the future will make possible" (Schön! magazine), it was shortlisted for The Stage Awards and an Ivan Juritz Prize.

He is currently adapting James Joyce's Finnegans Wake in a series of works leading up to the centenary of the book's publication.

== Other works ==
In July 2019, his Two Panels for String Quartet was released by the Altius Quartet as part of Quadrants Vol. 3. It was shortlisted for a Scottish Award for New Music 2020. 2020 saw the release of the documentary opera A Boat in an Endless Blue Sea and the Scots-Yiddish Cantata The Drowning Shore, which incorporated Sholem Asch's God of Vengeance as part of a collaboration with the playwright's descendants. He is currently composer-in-residence for the Ljubljana-based abeceda [new music ensemble], premiering a new series about negation including Anti-Music and Music Against —. His scores are published by UMP.

Other projects include an original score for the feature film Treasure Trapped, music for the Scottish School of Contemporary Dance, and a multidisciplinary installation for StAnza. He was a founding member of the bands White Heath (Electric Honey) and Blank Comrade (Red Wharf), and writes and speaks internationally on musicology and composition.

He holds a PhD from Goldsmiths, University of London, where he studied with Roger Redgate and Lauren Redhead. His studies were supported by the Tait Memorial Trust. He teaches composition at the University of Surrey and Slovenia's Inštitut .abeceda.

As an author, he is represented by Salma Begum at Greyhound Literary and his debut novel is due to be published by DUMBO Press in the autumn of 2026.

== Contingency dialectics ==
White describes his compositional methodology as proceeding from a New Materialist philosophical system, one that

foregrounds a radical new concept of subjectivity which can be realised through art: where subjectivity is a process of community that maintains (accepts) the undefiable integrity of individual monads only to combine them into a matrix of human and non-human (aesthetic, technological, etc) structures: that is, for instance, an art in which the creative reassembly of disparate, logical, mutually exclusive but reciprocally containing structures in turn effects the assembly of individuals involved in and experiencing it into a trans-subjective agent: composed of signs, meaning, and human process. This means: letting go of our old-fashioned selfhood as much as any old-fashioned 'decentring' in a surge of futures and utopias, in the optimism of a community where our imposed individualities combine, like the white rose of heaven, in the technologies of texts, operas and virtual worlds.

== Discography ==
- RUNE Métier Records MSV 28265, 2022
- WOAD Métier Records MSV 28617, 2021.
- ROBE Métier Records MSV 28609, 2021
- Quadrants Vol. 3 Navona Records NV6239, 2019
- Take No Thought for Tomorrow with White Heath. Electric Honey EH 1103, 2010
- If There Is Hope... with Blank Comrade. Red Wharf RW 104001, 2009
