= Julian Philips =

British composer (born 1969)

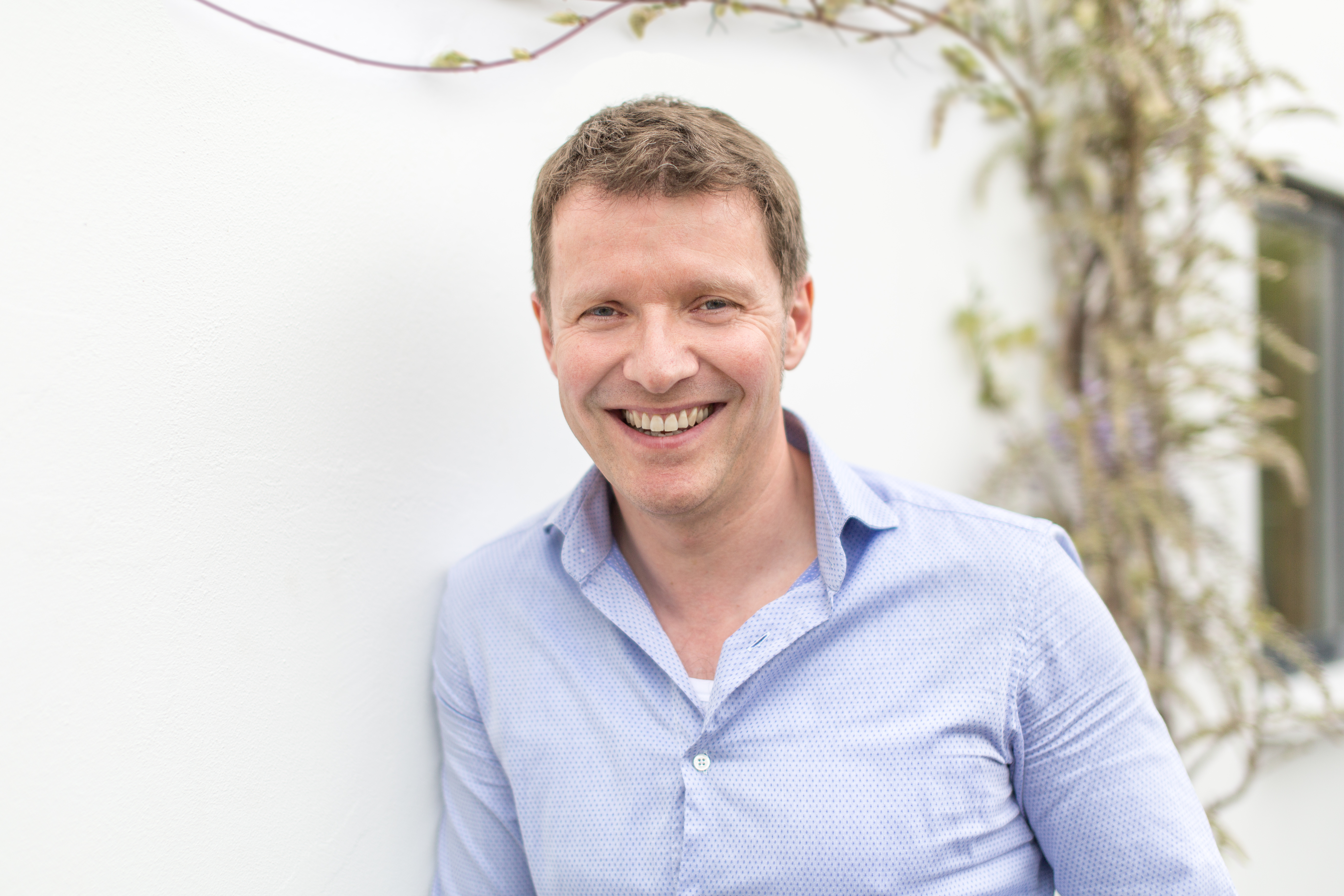

Background information
- Born: 17 April 1969 (age 57); Cardiff, Wales
- Genres: Opera & ballet, song & choral music, chamber & orchestral music, classical
- Occupation: Composer

Julian Philips is a British composer. Philips' works have been performed at major music festivals, including The Proms, Tanglewood, Three Choirs Festival, at the Wigmore Hall, South Bank Centre and Berlin Philharmonic Chamber Music Hall and by international artists such as Gerald Finley, Dawn Upshaw, Sir Thomas Allen, the Vertavo String Quartet, the Tanglewood Festival Orchestra, the BBC orchestras and the Aurora Orchestra.

He has had a number of broadcasts and was the subject of a BBC Wales TV documentary and a BBC 2 series.

In 2007, Philips was presented with an Honorary Fellowship from the Guildhall School, and subsequently conferred with a Professorship.

== Early life ==
Philips was born in Wales in 1969, brought up in Warwickshire, studied Music at Emmanuel College, Cambridge, completing his doctorate at Sussex University.

== Career ==
Philips took up the post of Head of Composition at the Guildhall School of Music and Drama in 2004 transforming the Guildhall Composition Department while also establishing a series of flagship projects, most notably a Doctoral Composer-in-Residence scheme, and an MA in Opera-Making & Writing, both in association with the Royal Opera House, Covent Garden. For over a decade, Philips has led the Wigmore Study Group an innovative adult education group which he established for the Wigmore Hall, and has enjoyed a particular association with the Orchestra of the Swan, both through a series of commissions and education projects. In 2007, Philips was presented with an Honorary Fellowship from the Guildhall School, and subsequently conferred with a Professorship.

== Works ==
Philips held the Glyndebourne's first Composer in Residence. He is published by Edition Peters.

Whilst at Glyndebourne, Philips completed two chamber operas in 2006-2009, Followers with libretto by Simon Christmas and The Yellow Sofa with a libretto by Edward Kemp. He then went on to write his youth opera Knight Crew for Glyndebourne with a libretto by Nicky Singer; the opera subsequently featured in a BBC 2 documentary. His opera How the Whale Became, again with a libretto by Edward Kemp, was written for the 2013/14 Royal Opera House's Christmas season. In 2017, Philips' opera The Tale of Januarie received its premiere at the Guildhall School of Music and Drama in London, based on Chaucer's The Merchant's Tale with a Middle English libretto by writer Stephen Plaice.

In 2003, Philips collaborated with British choreographer Michael Corder on a new full-length ballet based on Les Liaisons Dangereuses for English National Ballet, collaborating again with Corder on a Prokofiev-based score for The Snow Queen, again for English National Ballet. In 2012, Philips worked with French choreographer Mikaël 'Marso' Rivière on a hybrid dance-concerto for violist Maximillian Baillie and the Aurora Orchestra, which premiered at the 2012 Deal Festival. His has been featured on BBC radio.

In 2018 Philips is working on a new viola concerto for violist Virginia Slater, a large-scale choral work with a text by Stephen Plaice commissioned by InterOpera, and a new oboe quintet for the Wigmore Hall.

=== Operas ===
- Henny Penny (2022), a primary school opera bringing together music and modern language learning, with a libretto by Stephen Plaice in English, French (Coquotte Chocotte). Scored for mezzo-soprano, baritone and children's chorus, with violin, clarinet and piano. Duration: 25 minutes.
- The Tale of Januarie (2016–17), full-length Opera after Geoffrey Chaucer, with a libretto by Stephen Plaice, commissioned by the Guildhall School of Music and Drama. Duration: 2 hours, 15 minutes.
- How the Whale Became (2013), family chamber opera after Ted Hughes for five singers and five players, with a libretto by Edward Kemp, commissioned by the Royal Opera House, Covent Garden. Duration: 80 minutes.
- Good Intentions (2012), children's opera with a libretto by Simon Christmas, commissioned by W11 Opera. Duration: 80 minutes.
- Save the Diva (2011), street opera scene for soprano, trombone and accordion, with a libretto by Simon Christmas, commissioned by The Opera Group. Duration: 15 minutes.
- Knight Crew (2010), full-length youth opera, with a libretto by Nicky Singer, commissioned by Glyndebourne Festival Opera. Duration: 2 hours.
- The Yellow Sofa (2009), chamber opera based on the novella Alves & Co. by Eça de Queiros, with a libretto by Edward Kemp, commissioned by Glyndebourne Festival Opera. Duration: 80 minutes.
- Varjak Paw (2008), family chamber opera, after the novels by SF Said, with a libretto by Kit Hesketh-Harvey, commissioned by The Opera Group. Duration: 1 hour, 50 minutes.
- Followers (2006–11), site-specific promenade opera with a libretto by Simon Christmas, commissioned by Glyndebourne Festival Opera. Duration: 1 hour.
- Of Water and Tears (2007), opera fantasy for chorus & small orchestra, based on O Waly, Waly, devised for Glyndebourne's Jerwood Chorus Development scheme with director Claire Whistler. Duration: 15 minutes.
- Wild Cat (2006), children's opera with a libretto by Berlie Doherty, commissioned by Welsh National Opera. Duration: 30 minutes.
- Dolffin (2005), children's opera with a libretto by Gwyneth Lewis, commissioned by Welsh National Opera. Duration: 30 minutes.

=== Theatrical Concert Work ===
- Looking West (2022) for soprano, mezzo-soprano, actor, mixed ensemble (8 players) and field recordings, with a libretto by Rebecca Hurst. Commissioned to celebrate the 150th anniversary of the birth of Vaughan Williams, the work explores an ancient Cumbrian pilgrimage route, the Saint Bega Way, interwoven with the experiences of a contemporary pilgrim and the paintings of Winifred Nicholson.

=== Dance ===
- Maxamorphosis (2012), hybrid dance-concerto for viola, dancers and chamber orchestra. Created with choreographer Mikael Marso Riviére for violist Max Baillie and the Aurora Orchestra.
- The Snow Queen (2005), full-length ballet based on Prokofiev's Tale of the Stone Flower commissioned by English National Ballet for choreographer Michael Corder.
- Les Liaisons Dangereuses (2003), full-length ballet after the Choderlos de Laclos novel, devised with choreographer Michael Corder, commissioned by English National Ballet.

=== Orchestral works ===
- Ballades Concertantes (2017) for solo viola, double bass & chamber orchestra, commissioned by the Orchestra of the Swan. Duration: 25 minutes.
- All that remains (2014) for large orchestra, commissioned by the National Orchestra of Belgium marking the centenary of the opening of the First World War. Duration: 13 minutes.
- Come forth to play (2013) for brass, percussion and organ, commissioned by the Guildhall School of Music and Drama to mark the opening of Milton Court. Duration: 6 minutes.
- Maxamorphosis (2012), hybrid dance-concerto for viola, dancers and chamber orchestra. Created with choreographer Mikael Marso Riviére for violist Max Baillie and the Aurora Orchestra. Duration: 27 minutes.
- Divertissement (2004), suite for chamber orchestra, drawn from the ballet Les Liaisons Dangereuses. Duration: 25 minutes.
- Out of Light (2001), poem for large orchestra, commissioned for the BBC National Orchestra of Wales, for The Proms in 2001. Duration: 21 minutes.
- Strange Seas (1998), poem for orchestra, commissioned by the Britten Sinfonia. Duration: 16 minutes.

=== Voice and orchestra ===
- Masque for Caliban (2006), on poems by Edward Kamau Brathwaite, for baritone and orchestra, commissioned by the Orchestra of the Swan for the Three Choirs Festival. Duration: 22 minutes.

=== Chorus and orchestra ===
- So gently darkness falls (2014) to a poem by John Masefield, for solo treble, choir and small orchestra, commissioned by Warwick School. Duration: 11 minutes.
- Sea and Stars (2012) to a text by Simon Christmas, for solo soprano, baritone, chorus and orchestra, commissioned by Ealing Choral Society. Duration: 33 minutes.
- Body of Water (2012) to a text by Simon Christmas, for solo tenor, choir, organ and brass quintet, commissioned by the John Armitage Memorial. Duration: 15 minutes.

=== Songs for voice and piano ===
- Love Songs for Mary Joyce (2016) to poems by John Clare, for tenor & piano, commissioned by the Wigmore Hall for James Gilchrist and Anna Tillbrook. Duration: 20 minutes.
- Love Songs of Amy Lowell (2011) to poems by Amy Lowell, for soprano & piano, commissioned by the Presteigne Festival. Duration: 16 minutes.
- Blist's Hill (2009) to a poem by Simon Christmas, for baritone & piano, commissioned by NMC Recordings, for the NMC Songbook. Duration: 3 minutes.
- An American Songbook (2004) to poems by Langston Hughes, for mezzo-soprano & piano, commissioned by the Ludlow English Song Weekend. Duration: 18 minutes.
- There is a morn by men unseen (2003) to a poem by Emily Dickinson, for baritone & piano, commissioned by the Wigmore Hall. Duration: 3.5 minutes.
- Life Lessens (2002) with text by Simon Christmas, for mezzo-soprano & piano, commissioned by Sue & Nicholas Nightingale. Duration: 25 minutes.
- Four Sonnets of John Clare (2002, rev. 2015) to poems by John Clare, for baritone & piano, commissioned by the Wigmore Hall. Duration: 10 minutes.
- Swift Partitions (1998) to poems by Emily Dickinson, for baritone & piano, commissioned by Jeremy Huw Williams. Duration: 14 minutes.
- An Amherst Bestiary (1997) a songbook to poems by Emily Dickinson, for voice & piano. Duration: 2–25 minutes.
- Der Jungling und der Tod (1997) to a poem by Josef von Spaun, for tenor & piano, commissioned by BBC Radio Three. Duration: 6 minutes.
- Eclogue (1996) to a poem by A. E. Housman, for baritone & piano, commissioned by Bromsgrove Concerts. Duration: 10 minutes.
- Fern Hill (1996) to the poem by Dylan Thomas, for baritone & piano, commissioned by Jeremy Huw Williams. Duration: 15 minutes.
- Dread of Starry Majesties (1995) to poems by Ivor Gurney, commissioned by the Lichfield Festival. Duration: 20 minutes.
- now i lay me down to dream of spring (1991) to poems by e e cummings, for tenor & piano. Duration: 25 minutes.

=== Works for voice and instruments ===
- The Country of Larks (2021) setting text from Robert Louis Stevenson's essay An Autumn Effect (1875), for tenor, horn and piano. Commissioned by the Oxford International Song Festival. Duration: 9 minutes.
- Turning Fifty (2019) setting five poems by Australian poet Judith Wright, for baritone, harp & cello. Duration: 20 minutes. Premiered by James Newby (baritone), with Oliver Wass (harp) and Leo Popplewell (cello) at the Milton Court Concert Hall in London, 25 November 2019.
- Cantos de Sonho (2013) to poems by Alexander Search (Fernando Pessoa) for soprano, tenor & piano trio, commissioned by the Ludlow English Song Weekend. Duration: 35 minutes.
- Sweet Love Remembered (2005) to poems by Amy Lowell, Amy Levy, Byron, May Swenson, James Merrill and Muriel Rukeyser, for baritone & string quartet. Commissioned by Sir Nicholas Goodison and the Wigmore Hall for baritone Gerald Finley and the Vertavo Quartet. Duration: 25 minutes.
- Swift Partitions (2003) to poems by Emily Dickinson, for baritone & chamber ensemble. Duration: 14 minutes.
- Love is more thicker than forget (1997) to a poem by e e cummings, for soprano, trumpet & organ. Duration: 3 minutes.
- Coronach (1995) to a poem by Oliver Fraser, for mezzo-soprano & viola, commissioned by BBC Radio 3. Duration: 9 minutes.

=== Chamber music ===
- A Series of Strange Encounters (2023) for marimba & wind quintet. Premiered by Evelyn Glennie and the New London Chamber Ensemble at the Lake District Summer Music Festival in July 2023. Duration: 15 minutes.
- Melodys of Earth and Sky (2022) for violin and clarinet. A series of creative transcriptions based on traditional folk tunes collected by the poet, John Clare. Recorded on NMC Recordings by Kate Romano (clarinet) and Ionel Manciu (violin), with John Clare poems and prose read by actor Toby Jones. Duration: 3-60 minutes.
- Barcarola (2019) for solo piano. Duration: 15 minutes.
- Winter Music (2016) for solo harp, commissioned by the Tanza Trust for harpist Oliver Wass. Duration: 10 minutes.
- Ricochets Between (2010) for clarinet, bassoon, horn, two violins, viola and piano, commissioned by the Britten Sinfonia and the Wigmore Hall for BBC Radio 3. Duration: 12 minutes.
- Four Characters (2003) for viola and piano, commissioned by BBC Radio 3 for violist Laurence Power. Duration: 12 minutes.
- Sextet (1999) for piano and wind quintet, commissioned by the 1999 Warwick & Leamington Festival. Duration: 16 minutes.

=== Unaccompanied voices ===
- I Sing of a Maiden (2012) a setting of the medieval lyric, for unaccompanied choir, commissioned for the Choir of Truro Cathedral. Duration: 3 minutes.
- Sorrowfull Songes (2012) to poems by Thomas Wyatt, for vocal ensemble, commissioned for The Proms 2012, broadcast live on BBC Radio 3. Duration: 15 minutes.
- Invocazione (2004) to a poem by Joseph Addison, for vocal ensemble, commissioned by the National Chamber Choir of Ireland. Duration: 11 minutes
- Reach for Andromeda (1995) to a poem by Olive Fraser, for vocal ensemble, commissioned by the Finzi Singers. Duration: 6 minutes.

=== Choir and organ ===
- The Promised Child (2018) to a text by Stephen Plaice, commissioned by InterOpera. Duration: 5.5 minutes.
- Church Music (2011) to a poem by George Herbert, commissioned for the Choirbook for the Queen. Duration: 6 minutes.
- Song's Eternity (2002) to a poem by John Clare, commissioned by the Musicians' Benevolent Fund for the combined choirs of Westminster Abbey, Westminster Cathedral and St Paul's Cathedral. Duration: 7 minutes.
- Vertue (1988) to a poem by George Herbert, commissioned for the choir of Clare College Cambridge. Duration: 7 minutes.

=== Choir and piano ===
- The Promised Child (2018) to a text by Stephen Plaice, commissioned by InterOpera. Duration: 5.5 minutes.

=== Works for children's voices ===
- Fern Hill (2014) to the poem by Dylan Thomas, for children's choir, flute, viola and harp, commissioned by Welsh National Opera and broadcast live on BBC Radio 3. Duration: 18 minutes.
- Two Carols and a curse (1999) on medieval lyrics, for children's choir and string orchestra, commissioned by the New London Children's Choir. Duration: 8 minutes.

=== Works in progress ===
- Through Silence (2024), for oboe and string quartet. Duration: 25 minutes.
