= The Tale of Januarie =

The Tale of Januarie is a full-length opera in four acts, completed by composer Julian Philips and writer Stephen Plaice in 2016-17, based on The Merchant's Tale from Chaucer's The Canterbury Tales. The work was commissioned and created for the Opera Department of the Guildhall School of Music and Drama, creatively developed during 2016, and then premiered at the Guildhall School's Silk Street Theatre on 27 February 2017 with a run of four performances. This premiere production was conducted by Dominic Wheeler, directed by Martin Lloyd-Evans with designer Dick Bird and lighting designer Mark Jonathan.

The Tale of Januarie was the first opera conceived in Chaucerian Middle English, with writer Stephen Plaice not only adapting the text of Chaucer's original tale and incorporating material from other Chaucer works, but also creating entirely new Middle English texts. Julian Philips's score is conceived for 12 soloists and chorus, large symphony orchestra and on-stage musicians; the opera has a running time of 2 hours 10 minutes, and is published by Edition Peters.

The Tale of Januarie is dedicated with affection and gratitude to Professor Sir Barry Ife CBE FKC FBbk HonFRAM FRCM, Principal of the Guildhall School of Music and Drama (2004-2017).

== Forces ==
=== Cast ===
- Priapus actor
- Januarie tenor
- Placebo tenor
- Justinus baritone
- May soprano
- Damyan high baritone
- Pluto medium baritone
- Proserpina soprano
- Signora Friuli/Mandrake/Rosina mezzo soprano
- Signora Ravizza/Flycap/Julieta mezzo soprano
- Signora Farina/Nightshade/Laura mezzo soprano
- Father Bruno bass
- Full Chorus

=== Orchestra ===
- 3 Flutes (2nd and 3rd doubling Piccolo)
- 2 Oboes & Cor Anglais
- 2 Clarinets in B flat & bass clarinet
- Contrabassoon
- 4 Horns in F
- 3 Trumpets in B flat
- 2 Tenor Trombones
- Bass Trombone & Tuba
- Timpani
- Percussion (3 players)
- Harp
- Piano, Organ (tuned to Pythagorean tuning)
- Strings

=== On stage musicians ===
- Flute, viola & harp (tuned to Pythagorean tuning)
- 3 bagpipes (doubling Fiddle, 2 Recorders)
- Percussion (2 players)

== Synopsis ==
Act 1

- Winter

Pavia. Lombardy. The townsfolk are performing the annual fertility rite around the pear tree. Januarie, a wealthy, but ageing knight, comes with his friends, Justinus and Placebo. After a colourful life, he has decided it is time to marry. He wants a young wife to care for him in old age. Justinus, a married man, counsels against taking a wife, especially a young one. Placebo, however, supports Januarie's marital enthusiasm.

The customers are looking for bargains. Placebo, the barber, is giving Januarie a haircut. While he is in the barber's chair, Januarie instruct his young servant Damyan to lure women over with his tray of ribbons so he can view them in the barber's mirror without being seen. His eye falls on May, a young milkmaid. Damyan is himself smitten by the girl and tries to discourage Januarie's interest in her. But the old man insists Damyan should find out where May lives.

- Spring

The Nymphs are welcoming the arrival of spring. Their mistress, Proserpina, arrives from Hades with his husband Pluto, King of the Underworld. They are fulfilling the agreement with Proserpina's mother that her daughter be allowed to spend half the year on earth. But Pluto doesn’t enjoy these earthly holidays. They watch January and May's wedding processions as they make their way to church. Proserpina doesn’t like the idea of an old man marrying such a young woman. Pluto doesn’t think they should interfere.

The marriage has now taken place, and the Priest has come to bless the nuptial bed. When May throws her stocking behind her, as is the custom, it is Damyan who catches it. He will be the next to marry. Januarie cannot wait for the guests to leave. When they finally do so, he closes the curtains on their wedding night, leaving forlorn Damyan to listen to their love-making.

Act 2

Januarie wakes merrily, boasting of his prowess. May wakes appalled, recalling the full horror of her night beside her new husband. Januarie sends May and her maidservants to find out why Damyan is not attending him.

Damyan is love-sick, and borrows a few lines of Petrarch to express his love to May in a letter. May comes with her maidservants. She now realizes how strongly he feels about her. He smuggles the love-letter he has written into his blouse.

May has escaped to the privy to read the letter. Januarie, is calling for her to come back to the bed again. May reads the letter. She is triumphant., realizing she now has a rich husband and a strapping young lover. She no longer needs to work for Mistress Wellow, her domineering employer. She can milk the cow herself from now on.

Januarie wants to inflict further indignity on May, demanding that she strip for him. This is too much for Proserpina who has been looking on. She intervenes on May's behalf, calling on the goddess Fortuna to come to her aid. Januarie is suddenly struck blind.

Act 3

- Summer

Proserpina's nymphs celebrate the hot season. Priapus comes to have some sport with them, but they see him off. January has put a wall up around the pear tree and created a pleasure garden exclusively for his and May's use. He comes with May and their entourage, including Damyan to inspect the work. Januarie now completely dependent on May and won’t let go of her. He is extremely jealous and wears the key to the gate of the pleasure garden around his neck at all times. No one else is going to enjoy the pleasures that he does.

Januarie dismisses Damyan. He is no longer needed. But Damyan remains in the room. May tries to persuade Januarie to remove the key so they can make love. May convinces Januarie he should save his ardour for the next day, when he can enjoy her fully in their pleasure-garden. She briefly relieves Januarie of the key and hands it to Damyan who quickly makes an imprint of it in soft wax. While Januarie frets in his bed, courting couples come to sing of their devotion to each other.

Act 4

Damyan arrives first at the gate to the pleasure garden, but struggles to open it with the counterfeit key. May is trying to delay their entry into the garden, and Januarie is growing suspicious. Damyan finally manages to slip inside the gate ahead of them.

Damyan has climbed up into the tree. May tells Januarie that before they make love she has a keen desire to eat the green pears. Standing on Januarie's back, she climbs up into the tree where Damyan is waiting for her. The two young lovers consummate their passion, but Pluto, who has been watching, is so outraged by Januarie's deception, he restores the old man's sight. Januarie is horrified to see his wife in flagrante with his servant. But now Proserpina intervenes again and provides May with the excuse for her behaviour. She has May tell Januarie that she had heard that a cure for blindness was for the blind man to witness a man and a woman struggling in a tree. She had enacted the scene for his benefit. Januarie protests that he saw a lot more than a struggle, but May counters this by telling him his sight has only been imperfectly restored. Januarie finally accepts the excuse, and they are reconciled.

- Autumn

Autumn has come and it is time for Pluto and Proserpina to return to the underworld. But they are taking Januarie with them. He has died. But, in the afterlife, he can see that May is now carrying a child, which he imagines is his. He tries to communicate with her, but she can no longer see him. He pleads with Pluto to allow him a little more time on earth, so he can be with the woman he loves and see their child born, but Pluto refuses. Though Januarie is now on his way to the underworld, the gods do not disillusion him that the coming child is his. He may at least continue to believe he has left behind an heir.

== Critical reception ==
The Tale of Januarie was warmly received by the UK national press, with four star reviews in the Guardian, Financial Times and Sunday Express, a four star online review on Planet Hugill and five star on Music OMH. Claire Seymour's review in Opera Magazine noted that: "The score is...eclectic and confirms Philips's Britten-esque command of operatic ventriloquism; the music moves deftly between parodic distortion and a personal language that ranges from dry dissonances to ironic pseudo-Romanticism"

The opera's Middle English context attracted wide comment, most notably online on Global Chaucers in the article "The Tale of Januarie: Translingualism and Anxietie, Sexuality and Time" by David Wallace, Judith Rodin Professor of English at the University of Pennsylvania.

== Cross Language Dynamics: Reshaping community ==
The opera The Tale of Januarie was funded by the Arts & Humanities Research Council (AHRC) through the Cross-Language Dynamics Open World Research Initiative (OWRI) project, led by the University of Manchester, in which the Guildhall School of Music and Drama is a satellite partner.
