= CN Lester =

British musician & activist (born 1984)

- Born: 1984 (age 41–42)
- Occupation: Singer
- Website: cnlester.com

CN Lester (born 1984) is a British classical and alternative singer-songwriter, as well as an LGBT and transgender rights activist. They were rated 41st on The Independent on Sunday's 2013 Pink List, which acknowledged their co-founding of the Queer Youth Network and their founding the UK's first gay–straight alliance, as well as their fundraising for queer causes and writing for publications such as New Statesman and So So Gay.

== Career ==
Lester is a mezzo-soprano who specializes in castrati and travesti opera, as well as early and classical music and works by female composers. Classic FM has showcased their work and research on travesti roles, while BBC Radio 4's Front Row has included their work with Silent Opera. They've cited Lou Reed and Tchaikovsky as amongst their earliest influences, aged 3–4.

As a child, Lester began learning to play the piano at age 6, and received vocal coaching from age 13. They went on to obtain a BMus degree from King's College London and an MMus from Goldsmiths, University of London. In 2019, Lester received a PhD degree in music from the University of Huddersfield.

Their albums Dark Angels and Aether were funded using crowdfunding platform Indiegogo and raised US$3414 and £4575, respectively.

In addition to performing live and recording music, Lester works as a teacher and an author. Their debut opera, The Lion-Faced Man, appeared at Tête à Tête: The Opera Festival in August 2015, including a libretto by Hel Gurney and sung by Alison Wells. Their first book, Trans Like Me: A Journey For All Of Us was published by Virago Press in May 2017, which they credited as being inspired by Bill's New Frock by Anne Fine, Dykes to Watch Out For by Alison Bechdel, and My Gender Workbook by Kate Bornstein.

== Discography ==
Resurrection Men

- Released: 2009
- Format: MP3
- Label: Southbank
- Tracks: "Playback", "Brackets", "Wayfaring Stranger"

Ashes

- Released: 2012
- Format: MP3 and CD
- Writer: CN Lester
- Tracks: "Ashes", "Tongue", "Shiver", "Fractals", "Fever", "Disappear", "Lullaby", "Joan of Arc"

Dark Angels (with Toby Carr)

- Released: 2012/2013
- Format: MP3 and CD
- Writers: Benjamin Britten, Peter Maxwell Davies, Jonathan Kulp, Philip Lawton
- Tracks: "Songs from the Chinese, Op. 58: II. The Old Lute", "Songs from the Chinese, Op. 58: III. The Autumn Wind", "Songs from the Chinese, Op. 58: IV. The Herd-Boy", "Songs from the Chinese, Op. 58: V. Depression", "Farewell to Stromness", "Dark Angels, Op. 50: The Drowning Brothers", "Dark Angels, Op. 50: II. Dark Angels", "Dark Angels, Op. 50: III. Dead Fires", "Five Lullabies: Lullaby II", "Five Lullabies: Lullaby IV", "Five Poems of Emily Dickinson: II. I Had Been Hungry", "Five Poems of Emily Dickinson: III. I'm Nobody", "Five Poems of Emily Dickinson: IV. I Had a Guinea", "Nocturnal After John Dowland, Op. 70"

Aether

- Released: 2014
- Format: MP3 and CD
- Writer: CN Lester
- Tracks: "Lockdown", "Sparks", "Codine Blues", "Anonymous", "You", "Your Hands", "Low", "Aether"

== Awards ==
Lester was ranked 41st on The Independent on Sunday's 2013 Pink List of the most influential LGBT people, and 92nd in the renamed 2014 Rainbow List.

== Identity ==
Lester is out as genderqueer, and has been hailed as a role model for combining their identity and their public career. They have spoken about having difficulties finding work because of their gender identity and expression:

Classical music, now, is very conservative. I can't get chorus work because I wouldn't be willing to wear female clothes or be a member of a women's chorus. ... They didn't see that they were in the wrong – they thought I was wrong for daring to apply. So it was very much "We don't want people like that associated with us" and they were happy to put it down in writing.

To preserve their singing voice, Lester has not used testosterone treatments, although they've since spoken about their own research showing losing a singing voice is not always a result of such therapy.
