= Khodadad Jalali =

Iranian film director and screenwriter (born 1972)

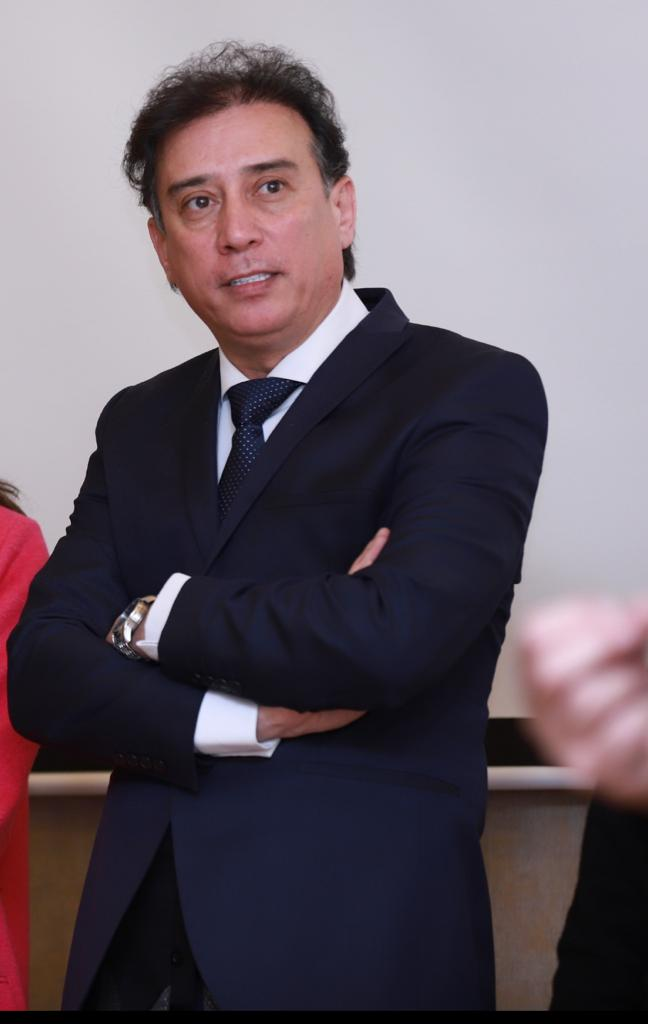
- Born: 29 October 1972 (age 53); Tehran, Iran
- Occupations: Film director, screenwriter, film producer
- Years active: 1993–present
- Notable work: A Baby With Red Socks

Khodadad Jalali (Persian: خداداد جلالی) is an Iranian film director and screenwriter. He is best known for winning the Best Director Award at Mediterranean Film Festival Cannes and Helsinki Festival for A Baby With Red Socks in 2017. He also has participated in film festivals as a jury member and the head of the jury team.

== Career ==
Jalali was born in 1972 in Tehran. He started his directing career in 1993. Jalali has written and directed several short films including some documentary and some feature films.

== Awards ==
Year	Award	Category	Nominated work	Result	Notes
2017	Mediterranean Film Festival Cannes in France	Best Director Award	A Baby With Red Socks	won	
2017	Helsinki Festival in Finland	Best Director Award	A Baby With Red Socks	won	
2017	Santiago International Film Festival in Chile	Best Director Award	A Baby With Red Socks	won	
2017	Golden Triangle Film Festival in India	Best Film Award	A Baby With Red Socks	won	
2017	Delhi International Film Festival in India	Best Film Award	A Baby With Red Socks	won	

== Jury Member Of International Film Festivals ==
- Head of the jury team of Mediterranean Film Festival Cannes, 2017.
- Head of the jury team of Quito film festival, 2016.
- Jury Member Of International Film Festival of Shimla, 2017.
- Jury Member of La Paz International Film Festival, 2017.
