= Nicky Singer =

English author (1956–2023)

- Born: 22 July 1956; Chalfont St Peter, Buckinghamshire, England
- Died: 17 June 2023 (aged 66); Brighton, East Sussex, England
- Education: Bristol University
- Occupations: novelist; playwright; librettist
- Spouse: James King-Smith (m. 1983)
- Children: Roland; Edmund; Xavier
- Writing career
- Period: 1993–2020
- Subjects: bullying; terrorism; loss; climate change
- Notable awards: Blue Peter Book Award; 2002
- Website: nickysinger.com

Nicky Singer (22 July 1956 – 17 June 2023) was an English novelist, playwright and librettist known best for her young adult books that often tackled controversial or sensitive subjects.

== Early life and education ==
Singer grew up in the village of Chalfont St Peter, England. She showed an interest in writing from a young age, winning a chocolate bar for a story she wrote aged 6.

Her father died suddenly when she was 14, which she cites as a "trigger event" in her life, teaching her not to take life for granted. At 16 her godfather encouraged her to write a cantata adaptation of Jonah and the fish which went on to be her first published work. Her mother died when Singer was 17, leaving her in loco parentis for her younger sisters.

She attended Queen Anne's School and went on to study English at the University of Bristol, graduating in 1978.

== Death ==
Nicky died on 17 June 2023 in Brighton following a stroke; she was 66.

== Published writings ==
- To Still the Child (1992)
- To Have and to Hold (1993)
- What She Wanted (1997)
- My Mother's Daughter (1998)
- Little Book of the Millennium (1999)
- Feather Boy (2002)
- The Innocent’s Story (2003)
- Doll (2003)
- Gem X (2008)
- Knight Crew (2009), transformed into an opera of the same name in 2010.
- Under Shifting Glass (2011)
- The Flask (2012)
- Island (2015), originally commissioned as a play for The National Theatre
- The Survival Game (2018)
- The Wind in the Willows (2020), illustrated by Anna Shuttlewood.

== Awards and honours ==
- The Innocent's Story – Nominated for the Carnegie Medal in 2006
- The Flask – Nominated for the Carnegie Medal & UKLA shortlist for age 7–11 and Student Shadowing Vote Winner
- Feather Boy – Blue Peter Book of the Year Award (2002) in the categories of "Book I Couldn't Put Down" and "Book of the Year", British Academy Children's Awards best children's drama (2004)
