= Na'ama Zisser =

- Genres: Cantorial; opera
- Occupation: Composer
- Website: www.naamazisser.com

Na'ama Zisser (Hebrew: נעמה זיסר) is a London-based composer.

Her work is visually driven and often collaborative with other art forms, with a focus on opera, contemporary dance, moving image, installations, staged performances, and instrumental music. Her practice involves the use of both electronic and acoustic mediums. Her music is concerned with intonation, textures, intimacy, and nostalgia, and has been described as ‘free of cliches’ (The Guardian) and ‘hauntingly melodic’ (The Stage). She is the first to introduce cantorial music into contemporary opera. She is currently based in London.

== Early life and education ==
Zisser was raised in an ultra-orthodox background. The fourth of five siblings, she began her classical music education at the age of six, playing piano. She went on to study composition at the Jerusalem Academy of Music and Dance, before moving to London to study at the Royal College of Music with Mark-Anthony Turnage where she won the Hurlston & Cobbett Prize. She completed her doctorate at the Guildhall School of Music and Drama

== Musical career ==
Between 2015 and 2018, Na'ama Zisser was the doctoral composer in residence at the Royal Opera House and made her debut with the opera company with Mamzer/Bastard in the 2018 season. The newly commissioned opera was the first to feature and reference Orthodox-Jewish Cantorial music with a role written for a Cantor. Directed by Jay Scheib and conducted by Jessica Cottis, the opera premiered at the Hackney Empire to sold-out shows.

Na’ama Zisser has been commissioned by and worked with such ensembles and organisations as: London Symphony Orchestra, London Contemporary Orchestra, London Sinfonietta, Aurora Orchestra, CHROMA ensemble, Royal Opera House, National Opera Studio, Tête à Tête, Jerusalem Symphony Orchestra, Israeli Contemporary Players and Ujazdowski Centre for Contemporary Art.

She has held residencies and fellowships with Sound & Music, East London Dance, Britten–Pears Artist Programme, Classical Next fellowship Rabbit Island Foundation & Rozsa Centre for Performing Arts, and LSO Soundhub residency, where she composed a piece for chamber ensemble, live visuals and karaoke singers. Her work has been supported by the Arts Council, Jerwood Arts and PRS, as well as broadcast on BBC Radio 3 and online radio station NTS. Zisser's music has been performed internationally across Europe, America and Israel.

In 2022, Zisser scored the first season of BBC radio 4's new horror audio anthology, LUSUS, which starred Ncuti Gatwa, Alistair Petrie and Morfydd Clark.

== Notable works ==
=== Chamber ===
- Drowned In C (2015) for chamber ensemble (commissioned by the London Sinfonietta)
- Empty Orchestra (2015) for chamber ensemble, live visuals and karaoke singers (commissioned by London Symphony Orchestra Soundhub)
- Kara-Oke II (2016) for chamber ensemble, live visuals and karaoke singers (commissioned by London Symphony Orchestra Soundhub)

=== Orchestra ===
- Island Mantras (2019) for symphonic orchestra (commissioned by the Jerusalem Symphony Orchestra) [8']
- Trismus (2022) for chamber orchestra (commissioned by the Israel contemporary Players)

=== Opera ===
- Sandman (2012) (Guildhall School of Music and Drama)
- Black Sand (2013) (Tete a Tete and Grimeborn festivals)
- The last seed (2016) for six countertenors and chamber ensemble (commissioned by Tete a Tete)
- Mamzer/Bastard (2018) (commissioned by the Royal Opera House)

=== Vocal ===
- Lovesick (2018) for baritone and piano quartet (commissioned by YIVO)
- SCRUM (2018) for solo Baritone and piano (commissioned by the National Opera Studio)
- Beloved visitors (2020) for solo Baritone and piano quartet (commissioned by Manchester Jewish Museaum)

=== Solo ===
- No Hay Banda (2017) for solo guitar (commissioned by the International Guitar Foundation)

=== Other ===
- Anchorage (2021) - chamber ensemble composition for Contemporary Dance (choreographer: Yoshito Sakuraba, Abarukas Dance) (commissioned by the Rozsa Centre and Rabbit Island Foundation)
- What Will Survive of Us (2020) - six channel surround-sound installation 5.1 (Artist: Ursula Mayer) (commissioned by Ujazdowski Centre for Contemporary Art)
- Lusus (2022) - music for the audio horror anthology series (commissioned by BBC radio 4)
