= Feather Boy =

Children's novel

Feather boy
- First edition cover
- Author: Nicky Singer
- Illustrator: Kevin Longport
- Cover artist: Connie Talbot
- Language: English
- Series: 1
- Genre: Children's
- Publisher: Collins
- Publication date: 1 January 2002
- Publication place: United Kingdom
- Pages: 286

Feather Boy is a novel by Brighton-based author Nicky Singer; it was first published in 2002 by HarperCollins, under the Collins imprint and reissued under the Essential Modern Classics imprint in 2010. A TV adaptation was created by the BBC in 2004.

== Synopsis ==
Robert Nobel is a 12-year-old shy boy who despairs of his newly divorced parents. Living in the dog-leg, he has to face many difficulties. He is the victim of classroom jokes and a victim of Niker, the classroom bully. He is hated and forced to do disgusting things. His life changes when a storyteller, Catherine, invites some of his class to Mayfield Rest Home. In there, he has to do a project with an elder called Edith Sorrel.

Edith Sorrel asks him to go to Chance House, a lonely abandoned house standing out of nowhere at St Aubyns. He goes into finding the grave of David Sorrel: a 12 year old boy who took his life on the very top level of the abandoned house (Chance House). and tells this to the one he loves: Kate. However, Niker hears him and challenges him to spend a night together at the top. Having done this, Edith Sorrel gives him a new task: to create a coat of feathers just for her. He sews night and day to create it and finally, it is nearly ready. However, there is another problem: Niker. Niker destroys his coat of feathers and he has to sew it back! Finally, he gives it back to Edith and when she has it: she flies and then she dies.

In the end, he meets his father once again and they happily go fishing together.

== Adaptations ==
The book was adapted for television in 2004 and first shown as a series of six 30-minute episodes on the British TV channel, BBC One on 16 March. It was later repeated as a single feature-length programme on 30 May 2004.

The series was written and produced by Peter Tabern and directed by Dermot Boyd, starring Thomas Brodie-Sangster, Sheila Hancock and Aaron Taylor-Johnson. Tabern and Boyd shared the award for Best Drama at the British Academy Children's Awards.

In 2006 the National Theatre commissioned a musical version for young people to perform, for which Singer and Boyd wrote the script with lyrics by Don Black and music by Debbie Wiseman.
