= The Io Passion =

- Chamber opera by Harrison Birtwistle
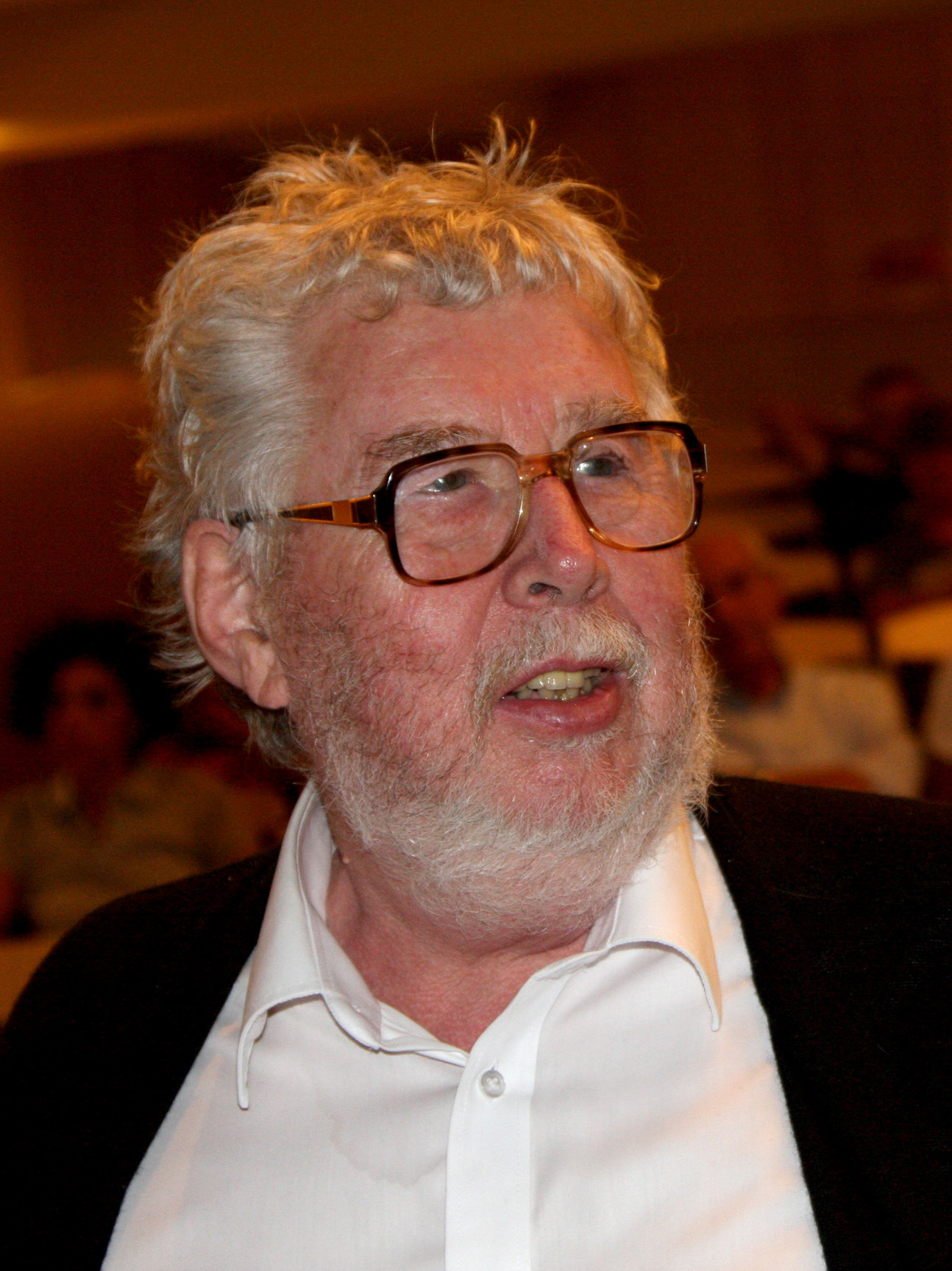
- The composer in 2008
- Librettist: Stephen Plaice
- Language: English
- Premiere: 11 June 2004; Snape Maltings, Aldeburgh

The Io Passion is a chamber opera with music by Harrison Birtwistle and a libretto in English by Stephen Plaice. It was commissioned jointly by the Aldeburgh Festival, Almeida Opera and the Bregenz Festival in Austria.

== Performance history ==
The Io Passion was premiered at the Snape Maltings as part of the Aldeburgh Festival on 11 June 2004 in a production directed by Stephen Langridge. It was then performed in July 2004 at the Almeida Theatre in London and at the Bregenz Festival. The work had its German premiere in Berlin on 7 November 2008 in a production by the Berliner Kammeroper, directed by Kay Kuntze.

== Critical reception ==
Reviews have generally been favourable, particularly in respect of Birtwistle's music. The composer's virtuosic use of a chamber ensemble, rather than the huge orchestral and electronic forces deployed, for instance, in The Mask of Orpheus, is generally seen as having produced an intensely atmospheric and psychologically insightful score.

- "Like the man and the woman themselves... we've been somewhere strange and something troubling has happened to us. And when we come out we're not quite the people we were when we went in." The Observer (London).
- "A marvellous score, one of Birtwistle's most lyrical, with episodes of piercing beauty, moving solos, expressive themes in repetition or sequence, clarinet writing, string writing, and vocal writing that stirred the heart." The Times (London).
- "What is striking above all is the utterly tender songfulness of this music. As you depart into the night, you know that you have heard a true Passion, that is, the passion and ritual of a timeless, eternal pattern." Die Dschungel, Germany.
- "The sense of something dark being stirred to life, of violence tightly contained, was riveting. The music, fascinating in its endlessly varied monotony, was exquisitely played, and the beautifully designed production seemed the perfect revelation of the work in all its vivid strangeness."The Daily Telegraph (London).
- "Birtwistle’s haunting, inventive music delves…deeply into the longings and confusion of the estranged lovers… it may be the most lyrical music the composer has written for the stage." Chicago Tribune

Some critics found The Io Passion dated in its attitudes to sexuality. "The notion that a holiday fling on a Greek island - however intense the connection, however heavy with meaning, however supernatural - might be analogous to the rape of Io by Zeus is peculiar enough. That that analogy might be titillating to someone whose former lover has effectively become her stalker smacks of the era when liberal men would chomp on their cigars while discussing the female orgasm."

Others, like "Alban Nikolai Herbst", found more unsettling depths beneath apparent glibness. Discussing a scene in which ferocious argument leads to a passionate kiss, he wrote,

Harrison Birtwistle's opera, then, does not merely concern itself with the truth of the mythical parable - how the ancient Cretan matriarchy was conquered by invading tribes, how the Mother Goddess was usurped by a Zeus whose barbarian horniness knew no bounds... That is a sinister and accurate picture, the picture of the powerlessness of cultures. But still, it isn't that simple. Something else is working through these characters and gods, something beyond their own will. Zeus is not merely an overpowerer. Io also wants to be overpowered, even though after the event, with the full righteousness of an emancipated woman, she denounces his raw aggression. Relations here are not merely not simple. They are complex... There is that scene with the kiss. And it rings true.

== Music ==
The Io Passion is scored for a chamber ensemble. The "rich circadian cycle of nocturnes and aubades for string quartet and basset clarinet is punctuated by ravishing ariettas, spluttered outbursts of unresolved argument and high-arching angular recitative".

=== Instrumentation ===
- basset clarinet (performed in the premiere by Alan Hacker)
- string quartet (performed in the premiere by Quatuor Diotima)
  - 2 violins
  - viola
  - cello

== Roles ==
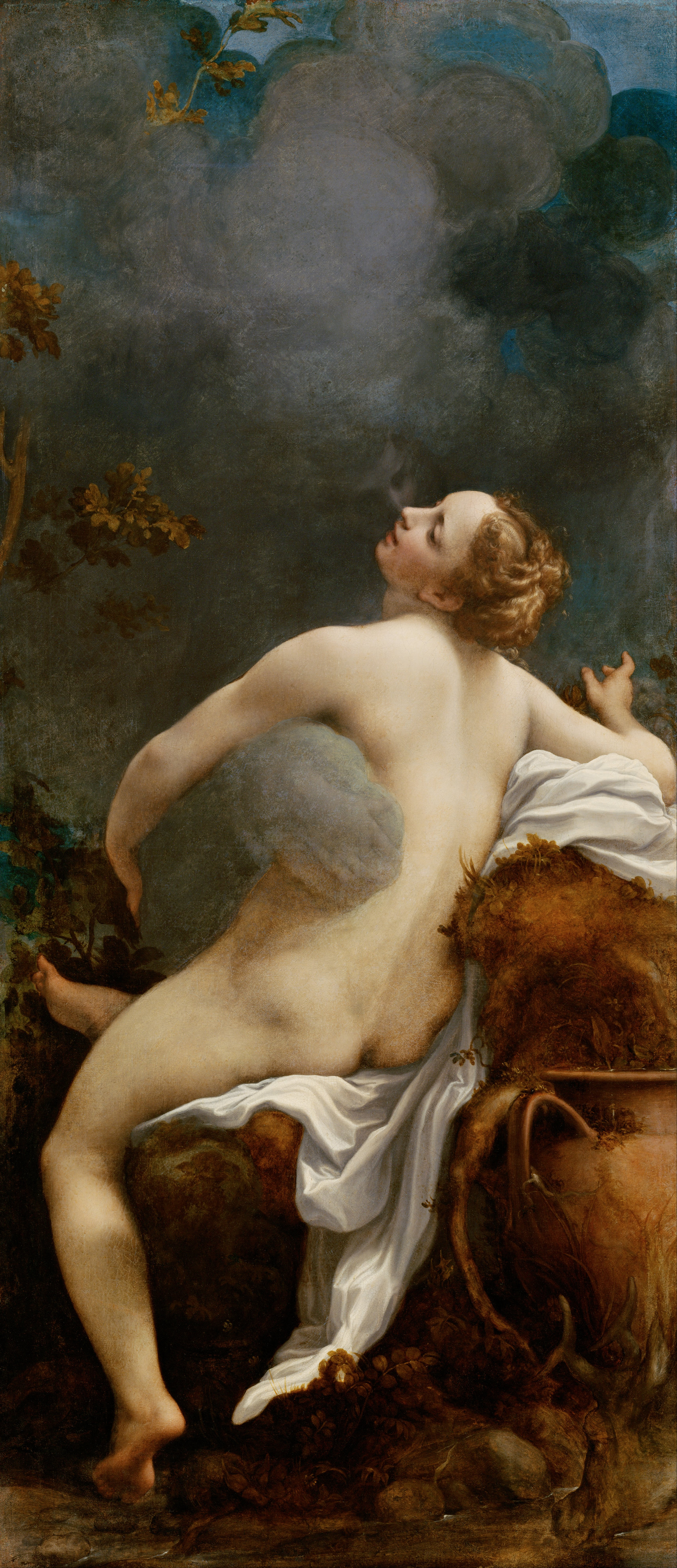
Zeus and Io by Antonio da Correggio c. 1531

Role	Voice type	Premiere Cast, 11 June 2004 (Conductor: Alan Hacker )
Woman 1, also Hera	non-singing role	Teresa Banham
Woman 2, also Hera	soprano	Claire Booth
Woman 3, also Io	soprano	Amy Freston
Man 1, also Inachus and the Gadfly	baritone	Sam McElroy
Man 2, also Zeus	non-singing role	Joseph Alessi
Man 3, also Hermes	baritone	Richard Morris

== Synopsis ==
A man, outside a house, and a woman, within it, watch and wait. The man posts a letter. The woman swats away a fly which is irritating her.

The same scene is re-enacted in variations of increasing complexity, gradually unveiling layers of stories from the past. The man and the woman met at Lerna in Greece, the venue of one of the Mysteries of the ancient world, and the place where Zeus seduced the priestess Io and turned her into a heifer to hide her from his jealous wife, Hera. Hera sent a gadfly to madden the heifer, and Io roamed the world trying to flee it.

The intense, compulsive passion of the lovers at Lerna awoke the ancient gods, who scented sacrifice. An outrage was committed, which has never been avenged. Back in the city, the woman refuses to see the man, clinging to her domestic routine and trying to deal with the terrible manifestation they witnessed in Greece. But neither the gods nor the man will leave the woman alone, and the civilised veneer of her existence is gradually stripped away.
