= The Merchant's Tale =

Part of the Canterbury Tales

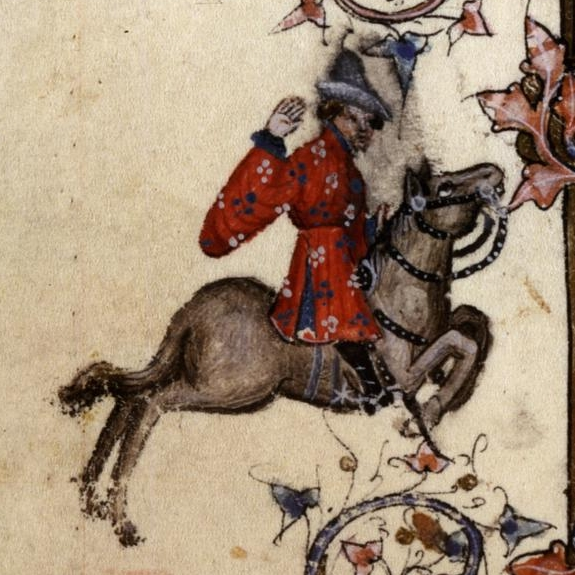
An illustration of the Merchant as depicted in the Ellesmere manuscript.

"The Merchant's Tale" (Middle English: The Marchantes Tale) is one of Geoffrey Chaucer's Canterbury Tales.

== Summary of the tale ==
After a prologue where the Merchant laments the cruelty of his spouse, he begins the story in Pavia, where Januarie, a sixty-year-old knight, is enamoured with the idea of marriage. He asks his two friends for advice. The first, Placebo, flatters him and agrees with all that he says, whereas the second, Justinus, advises him to be cautious when selecting a bride. Januarie ignores Justinus' advice and marries a young girl of around twenty years named May.

During the marriage feast after the ceremony is conducted, Januarie's squire, Damyan, falls in love with May. He secretly gives her a love letter, the sentiment of which she reciprocates and the forbidden couple start to plot a plan to consummate their love without Januarie's knowledge. Suddenly, by a stroke of fickle Fortune, Januarie is mysteriously struck blind, allowing May and Damyan's plan to come to fruition, as follows.

One day in June, when husband and wife are in the walled garden that Januarie built as a place to fulfil his sexual desires, May asks Januarie to pick a pear from one of the pear trees for her. Januarie, being blind, is incapable, so he lets her climb on his back to pick one herself. Damyan has been waiting in the tree for her, as he obtained a copy of the garden key from May, and when she climbs up, they begin to make love among the branches.

However, the gods Pluto and Proserpina are wont to walk in the garden, and have witnessed May's trick. Outraged by the behaviour of women, Pluto restores Januarie's sight. Januarie begins to panic as he sees his wife cheating on him with his squire in the tree. However, Proserpina, reacting to Pluto's behaviour, sends May an alibi to help her out of this situation. May declares to Januarie that she had learnt that his blindness would be cured if she would "struggle" with a man in a tree, and that his eyes deceive him. After some back-and-forth, Januarie is satisfied with May's explanations, and the two return home happily.

The tale is followed by an epilogue in which the Host complains about his own wife.

== Critical interpretations ==
In this tale, it has been argued by critics that Chaucer subtly mocks anti-feminist literature like that of Theophrastus ("Theofraste").

One question that splits critics is whether the Merchant's tale is a fabliau. Typically a description for a tale of carnal lust and frivolous bed-hopping, some would argue that especially the latter half of the tale, where Damyan and May have sex in the tree with the blind Januarie at the foot of the tree, represents fabliau. Derek Pearsall, for example, is in favour of this view. Some critics, such as Maurice Hussey, feel that Chaucer offers a great deal more sophistication and philosophical insight to put this on a level above fabliau.

Though several of the tales are sexually explicit by modern standards, The Merchant's is often regarded as especially so. Larry Benson remarks:

The central episode of the Merchant's Tale is like a fabliau, though of a very unusual sort: It is cast in the high style, and some of the scenes (the marriage feast, for example) are among Chaucer's most elaborate displays of rhetorical art.

== Technique and style ==
Many characters in this Tale have cratylic names: Januarie, the main character, is named in conjunction with his equally seasonal wife May, representing their individual characters: Januarie is "hoor and oolde", sharing the bare and unfruitful characteristics of his title month, whereas his youthful and "fresshe" wife represents the spring seasons. This has particular relevance when considering the parallel between this tale, and the Biblical tale of Adam and Eve. Januarie's brothers are named Placebo and Justinus: the former a sycophant, whose name in Latin means 'I will please', and the latter a fairer man ('the just one') with no individual motive.

The main character, Januarie is a typical example of the senex amans trope.

== Sources and variants ==
It has been argued that the tale also shows the influence of Boccaccio (Decameron: 7th day, 9th tale), Deschamps' Le Miroir de Mariage, Roman de la Rose by Guillaume de Lorris (translated into English by Chaucer), Andreas Capellanus, Statius, and Cato on Chaucer's writing.

Similar tales are Boccaccio's Story of Lydia and Pyrrhus and The Simpleton Husband from One Thousand and One Nights. Book IV of The Masnavi of Rumi contains another pear tree story.

== Adaptations ==
On 27 February 2017, the Guildhall School of Music and Drama premiered a new, full-length operatic adaptation of Chaucer's The Merchant's Tale created by writer Stephen Plaice and composer Julian Philips, entitled The Tale of Januarie. Plaice created his libretto in Middle English not only adapting the original Chaucer text for an operatic setting, but also drawing on other works by Chaucer and creating entirely original Middle English lyrics. Philips and Plaice structured this adaptation across all four seasons of the calendar year, extending Chaucer's original Tale into Autumn thereby following Januarie's tale on beyond the grave. The Tale of Januarie is published by Peters Edition.

In Pasolini's film The Canterbury Tales, this story is adapted with Josephine Chaplin as May and Hugh Griffith as Sir January.
