= The Yellow Sofa =

The Yellow Sofa is an opera by the British composer Julian Philips, with a libretto by writer and director Edward Kemp, based on the novella Alves & Co. by Eça de Queiros.

The opera was premiered by Glyndebourne Festival Opera in 2009, directed by Frederick Wake-Walker and conducted by Leo McFall. This premiere production was revived at Glyndebourne in autumn 2012 and then taken on a national tour that same year, including a performance at the Royal Opera House, Covent Garden. Both productions attracted wide critical notice, with a range of reviews in The Times Literary Supplement, The Guardian, The Daily Telegraph, and online.

== Roles ==
- Amarela (mezzo-soprano)
- Godofredo (baritone)
- Machado (tenor)
- Ludovina (soprano)
- Margarida (mezzo-soprano)
- Neto (baritone)
- Teresa (soprano)
- Carvalho (baritone)
- Medeiros (bass)
- Nunes Vidal (tenor)

== Synopsis ==
Amarela, the eponymous sofa the opera, has seen many a love affair unfold on her plump cushions.

Take Godofredo Alves for example, an everyday Lisbon business man, who comes home only to discover his wife, Ludovina, on the Yellow Sofa, in the clutches of his business partner, Machado. Godofredo's world then falls apart: he throws his wife out of their house, he consults his father-in-law Neto, and he turns to his friends Carvalho and Medeiros, in the hope that they might offer him a solution. Throughout the twisting and turning of Godofredo's newly awakened emotions, he converses with Amarela, the Yellow Sofa, contemplating a series of melodramatic solutions, including taking his own life, or challenging Machado to a duel. Eventually, Godofredo's feelings reach a peak of tension: and while he experiences his own dark night of the soul, his friends come to a collective decision on his behalf, offering a bathetic release from desperate heroics.

And so Godofredo returns to his humdrum life but on re-encountering his wife at the opera, they are reconciled over his inability to wind up the family clock.

== Forces ==
The Yellow Sofa is scored for string orchestra, two guitars (one classical, one Portuguese) and piano. The opera is 80 minutes in duration and is published by Edition Peters.
