= Edward Kemp (playwright) =

English playwright and theatre director (born 1965)

- Born: 9 October 1965 (age 60); Oxford, England
- Education: New College, Oxford
- Occupations: Playwright, theatre director former Director of RADA
- Parent: Eric Kemp (father)
- Writing career
- Notable work: 5/11
- Website: www.edwardkemp.co.uk

Edward Thomas Kemp (born 9 October 1965) is an English playwright and theatre director. He was Director of the Royal Academy of Dramatic Art (RADA) from 2008 to 2021.

== Early life ==
Kemp was born in Oxford, the son of Eric Kemp (then an Oxford theologian, later Dean of Worcester and Bishop of Chichester) and his wife Patricia née Kirk, daughter of Kenneth Kirk (also an Oxford theologian, latterly Bishop of Oxford).

Kemp was a chorister at Worcester Cathedral and a pupil at the King's School, Worcester. He trained with the National Youth Theatre, and studied English Language and Literature at New College, Oxford.

== Directing ==
After university, Kemp worked with the National Youth Theatre, before becoming an assistant director at the Chichester Festival Theatre, then with the Compass Theatre Company founded by Sir Anthony Quayle.

From 1991 to 1996, Kemp was Staff Director at the Royal National Theatre, where he worked with directors including Steven Pimlott, Richard Eyre and Sir Nicholas Hytner.

In 1996, Kemp joined Katie Mitchell's Royal Shakespeare Company production of The Mysteries, as dramaturg. Opening in April 1997, the work played at The Other Place in Stratford-upon-Avon as a play in two parts, The Creation and The Passion. It transferred to London in February 1998, entirely rewritten as a five-hour play. The London version met with widespread critical disapproval.

Kemp has collaborated (as a director and a writer) with the actor and writer Toby Jones on several projects, leading to the formation of the company The Table Show.

Kemp's collaboration with the choreographer Cathy Marston has led to a dozen ballets.

In 2007, Kemp directed Macbeth at the Regent's Park Open Air Theatre.

In August 2007, Kemp and Lucy Maycock co-directed Mr. Vertigo, a project based on the novel by Paul Auster, for the first summer residency at the North Wall Arts Centre in Oxford.

== Writing ==
Kemp wrote a farce about King Arthur aged seven, and his first full-length play The Iron and the Oak aged 15. This won him the award of Most Promising Playwright in the first Texaco/National Youth Theatre playwriting competition; two further plays, Counterparts and A Proper Place, also won awards in the competition.

Kemp's adaptation of William Faulkner's novel As I Lay Dying was premiered by the Young Vic company in May 1998. Kemp himself directed a revival by Swine Palace at the Claude L. Shaver Theatre, Louisiana State University in September 1998.

Kemp's stage adaptation of The Master and Margarita by Mikhail Bulgakov was first staged in July 2004.

Kemp's play 5/11 premiered at the Chichester Festival Theatre in August 2005, featuring Alistair McGowan as King James, to mark the 400th anniversary of the Gunpowder Plot in 1605. Addressing home-grown religious terrorism in the years after the September 11 attacks and soon after the 2005 London bombings, the play was considered "blazingly topical" by Telegraph reviewer Dominic Cavendish.

In 2011, to mark the 400th anniversary of the publication of the King James Version in 1611, Kemp edited 12 extracts of approximately 80 minutes' duration – six each from the Old and New Testaments – which were staged at the National Theatre.

=== Translation ===
For Théâtre Sans Frontières, a theatre company that stages accessible adaptations of foreign-language works in the original language, Kemp has dramatised – largely in French – Candide (1993), La Tulipe noire (1995), Le Mariage de Figaro (1997) and Les Trois Mousquetaires (1999), and has written a dramatisation in English and French of A Tale of Two Cities (1998).

Kemp has adapted Molière's comedies The Hypochondriac (1996) – incorporating a burlesque of Molière's earlier comedy Le Médecin volant – and Don Juan (1997), both staged at the West Yorkshire Playhouse, Leeds, directed by Toby Jones.

Kemp's version of Nathan the Wise by Gotthold Ephraim Lessing premiered at the Chichester Festival Theatre in 2003. Set in Jerusalem during the Third Crusade, the play explores issues of religious difference and tolerance.

Kemp adapted The Emigrants by W. G. Sebald as a radio play, which he directed for the BBC in 2013.

Kemp's translation of Jean Racine's tragedy Andromache, which preserves the French form (rhyming couplets of 12-syllable lines), was first staged at RADA in May to June 2015. It was broadcast as a radio play on BBC Radio 3 in January 2017.

=== Musical theatre and opera ===
Kemp (script) and Jason Carr (song lyrics and music) wrote the musical Six Pictures of Lee Miller, which recounts the life of American photojournalist Lee Miller. It was first produced at Chichester in July 2005.

Victoria Borisova-Ollas's opera The Ground Beneath Her Feet, for which Kemp wrote the libretto, is an adaptation of the novel of that name by Salman Rushdie. The premiere at Bridgewater Hall during the 2007 Manchester International Festival was narrated by Alan Rickman, conducted by Mark Elder, and featured a film component by Mike Figgis.

Kemp wrote the libretti for Julian Philips's chamber operas The Yellow Sofa, which premiered at Glyndebourne in 2009, and How the Whale Became, based on Ted Hughes's tales of animal creation, which was commissioned by the Royal Opera House and premiered in December 2013.

== RADA ==
Kemp joined the Royal Academy of Dramatic Art (RADA) in September 2007, as Artistic Director. He became Director in March 2008.

He also became Principal of the Conservatoire for Dance and Drama, an umbrella institution of which RADA is an affiliate, in November 2014.

In 2019, RADA graduate Laurence Fox criticised RADA's diversity policy on script submissions. Kemp defended the policy, stating that RADA must reflect a diverse society.

He resigned as Director of RADA in 2021.

Since 2021, Kemp has been chief executive of the Royal Literary Fund.
