= Philip Cashian =

English composer (born 1963)

Philip Cashian (born 1963) is an English composer. He is the head of composition at the Royal Academy of Music.

== Early life and education ==
Philip Cashian was born in Manchester in 1963 and studied at Cardiff University and the Guildhall School of Music and Drama with Oliver Knussen and Simon Bainbridge.

== Career ==
In 1990 he was the Benjamin Britten fellow at Tanglewood where he studied with Lukas Foss. He was awarded the Britten Prize in 1991, the Mendelssohn Scholarship in 1992 and the PRS Composition Prize in 1994. His fast-paced style of music has been described as "an uncompromising reflection of the modern world".

Cashian has collaborated and worked with many leading musicians, ensembles and orchestras. Performances include the St. Paul Chamber Orchestra, London Symphony Orchestra, BBC National Orchestra of Wales, BBC Symphony Orchestra, Britten Sinfonia, Royal Northern Sinfonia, Riga Sinfonietta, Ensemble Profil (Romania), Arctic Philharmonic, the Esprit Orchestra (Toronto), Birmingham Contemporary Music Group, London Sinfonietta, Ergon Ensemble (Athens), Festival de Mùsica de Alicante, Bergen Festival, Aspen Music Festival, Ojai Festival (California), Musikmonat (Basle), Moscow Autumn Festival, Aldeburgh Festival, Spitalfields Festival, Huddersfield Contemporary Music Festival and the BBC Proms as well as recent performances in Germany, France, Austria, Hungary, Holland, Norway, Spain, Denmark, Sweden, Italy, Australia, New Zealand and China.

In 2008 the London Sinfonietta commissioned Cashian to write The Opening of the House for their inaugural concert at Kings Place and later in the same year his first opera, The Cumnor Affair was premiered by Tête à Tête Opera Company at the Riverside Studios, London.

Recent commissions include Firewheel for Dark Inventions, Strix for the Britten Sinfonia Academy, the world's turning for the Esprit Orchestra (Toronto), Nocturnes and Dances for the Wye Valley Chamber Music Festival, The Language of Birds for Tabea Debus and Scenes from the Life of Viscount Medardo for Richard Watkins and the Red Note Ensemble. In 2017 his String Quartet No.2 was premiered in the St Magnus International Festival by the Gildas Quartet and Psappha gave the premiere of Leonora Pictures in Manchester followed by three further performances in New York, Oberlin and Aspen. His second piano concerto, The Book of Ingenious Devices, premiered by Huw Watkins and the BBC Symphony Orchestra conducted by Oliver Knussen in the 2018 Aldeburgh Festival was described in The Times as '"mesmerising music". In the 2019 Beijing Modern Music Festival the Guiyang Symphony Orchestra gave the premiere of his most recent orchestral work, Fanfaronades.

Cashian has also written extensively for young and amateur musicians: to date he has written six pieces for the ABRSM’s Spectrum series as well as large scale works for Contemporary Music for All and the Centre for Young Musicians. Between 2010 and 2013 he was invited by the British Council to curate a series of concerts of contemporary British music in Bucharest during the course of which works by over sixty living British composers were performed.

He is also a sought after teacher and has been Head of Composition at the Royal Academy of Music since 2007. He is published by Wise Music and Composers Edition. Recordings of his music are available on the NMC label including the two portrait discs The House of Night and Dark Inventions.

He is published by Wise Music and Composers Edition.

Recordings of his music are available on the NMC label including the two portrait discs The House of Night and Dark Inventions.

== Selected works (full list of works available here) ==
=== Stage works ===
The Cumnor Affair chamber opera in one act, libretto Iain Pears (2008)

=== Orchestral works ===
Chamber Concerto for 16 instruments (1995)

Tableaux (2003)

Three Pieces for chamber orchestra (2004)

Concerto for cello and strings (2012)

Io (2002)

The World's Turning (2015)

The Book of Ingenious Devices (piano concerto no.2) (2016)

Fanfarronades (2019)

=== Choral works ===
Music for an Empty Sky (2000)

The Winter's Spring (2013)

Fall Leaves, Fall (2017)

=== Chamber works ===
Dark Inventions for flute, clarinet, percussion, piano, cello (1992)

Horn Trio for horn, piano, violin (1998)

The Devil's Box for clarinet, piano, viola (1999)

Caprichos for clarinet, piano, violin, cello (2002)

Mechanik for any combination of instruments (2003)

Aquila for clarinet, piano, cello (2010)

Settala's Machine for double wind quintet (2012)

Firewheel for flute, clarinet, vibraphone, violin, cello (2013)

Leonora Pictures for flute, clarinet, horn, percussion, harp, violin, cello (2017)

Brass Quintet (2018)

Dances and Nocturnes for violin, viola, cello, piano (2019)

A House of Rumours for flute, clarinet, trumpet, horn, piano, violin, cello (2020)

Physichromie for piano trio (2021)

=== Works with voice ===
So Lonely for mezzo-soprano and string quartet (1994)

The Dark Horsemen and Other Tales for soprano and viola (1996)

Three Baudelaire Songs for soprano, viola and piano (2011)

The Songs Few Hear for mezzo-soprano and piano (2010)

Ballad of the Moon, Moon for counter tenor (or mezzo) and piano (2020)

Madrigali for mezzo-soprano and cello (2022)

=== Instrumental works ===
Dancing with Venus for cello and piano (1992)

Songs from a Still World for alto saxophone or clarinet (2000)

Tag for solo percussion (2000)

The Language of Birds for solo alto recorder (2016)

Short Stories for solo piano (2019)

Spoor for solo guitar (2020)

The Art of Memory for solo cello (2021)

Saltimbanques for violin and piano (2021)
