= Senex amans =

Stock character in Greco-Roman and medieval works

A senex amans (from Latin: "aged lover", "amorous old man") is a stock character of classical Greek and Roman comedy, medieval literature (e.g., fabliau) and drama. It is an old jealous man married to a young woman and thus often an object of mockery. He is variously ugly, impotent, puritanical, and foolish to be cuckolded by a young and handsome man. Often the term senex amans is applied to the very motif involving the three.

The classic example of a senex amans is Januarie (January) in the "Merchant's Tale" (part of the Canterbury Tales). He is 60 years old (which given the life expectancy was a very advanced age) and he marries a young girl (under 18) named May, who later cuckolds him by entering into a secret relationship with January's squire, Damyan (Damian).

The senex amans is not always a one-dimensional figure presented for derision. The morality within the tale itself is somewhat ambiguous, with the corrosive irony directed at January coupled with a more generalised sympathy and understanding.

== See also ==
- Forced marriage
- Senex iratus
