= Knight Crew =

Opera by Julian Philips

Knight Crew is an opera in two acts composed by Julian Philips with a libretto by Nicky Singer. The opera is based on the novel of the same name, also by Singer, which retells the legend of King Arthur in a modern gangland setting.

The opera premièred on 3 March 2010 at Glyndebourne Festival Opera. The project was filmed for a television series, presented by Gareth Malone, Gareth Malone Goes to Glyndebourne, which aired on the BBC on 1 July 2010. Knight Crew is published by Edition Peters.

Knight Crew was created by Philips as part of his four year creative residency at Glyndebourne from 2006 to 2010. Philips was Glyndebourne's first ever composer-in-residence, a residency set up as an AHRC-funded collaborative doctorate between Glyndebourne and Sussex University. Along with Knight Crew, Philips created two other operas as part of his residency: The Yellow Sofa (2009) based on the novella Alves & Co. by Eça de Queiros, and a site-specific promenade opera Followers (2006–11), with writer Simon Christmas.
