= Tête à Tête (opera company) =

Cornish opera company

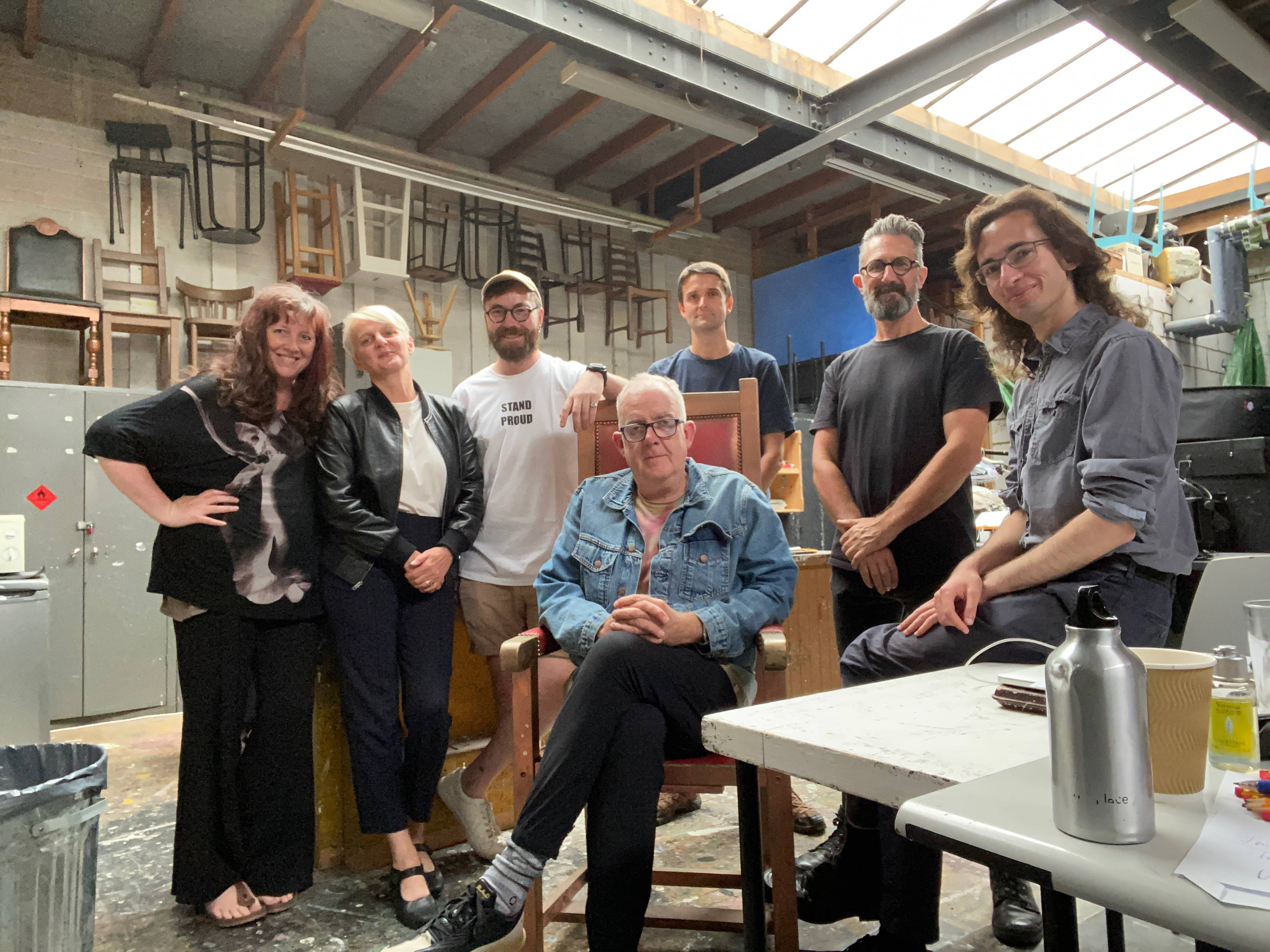
Tête à Tête company members, including founder Bill Bankes-Jones (seated, centre)

Tête à Tête is an opera company based in Cornwall that currently operates in Cornwall, London and North-East England. Its primary mission is to reach new audiences, support artists' development, and to extend the boundaries of traditional opera.

== History ==
A charity-based arts company, Tête à Tête was founded in 1997 by its current Artistic Director, Bill Bankes-Jones, the conductor Orlando Jopling and then-administrator Katie Price. Originally the company produced works such as The Flying Fox (Die Fledermaus). This was first performed at the Battersea Arts Centre in 1998 then went to the Purcell Room. Shorts followed in 1999, again first performed at the Battersea Arts Centre and then revived at the Bridewell Theatre in 2001. Shorts became Tête à Tête's first touring production. The company established Tête à Tête: The Opera Festival in 2006. The festival has since played host to over 150 guest companies. It is currently led by Bill Bankes-Jones, music director Timothy Burke, and administrative director Anna Gregg.

In 2012, the company collaborated with the Royal College of Music to create new operas based on Great Expectations, written by composition students at the College. The collaboration has continued, with subsequent operas based on Hogarth's Stages, Crime and Punishment, and Frankenstein.

In 2022, Tête à Tête was awarded funding from Arts Council England to continue as a part of the National Portfolio.

== Tête à Tête: The Opera Festival ==
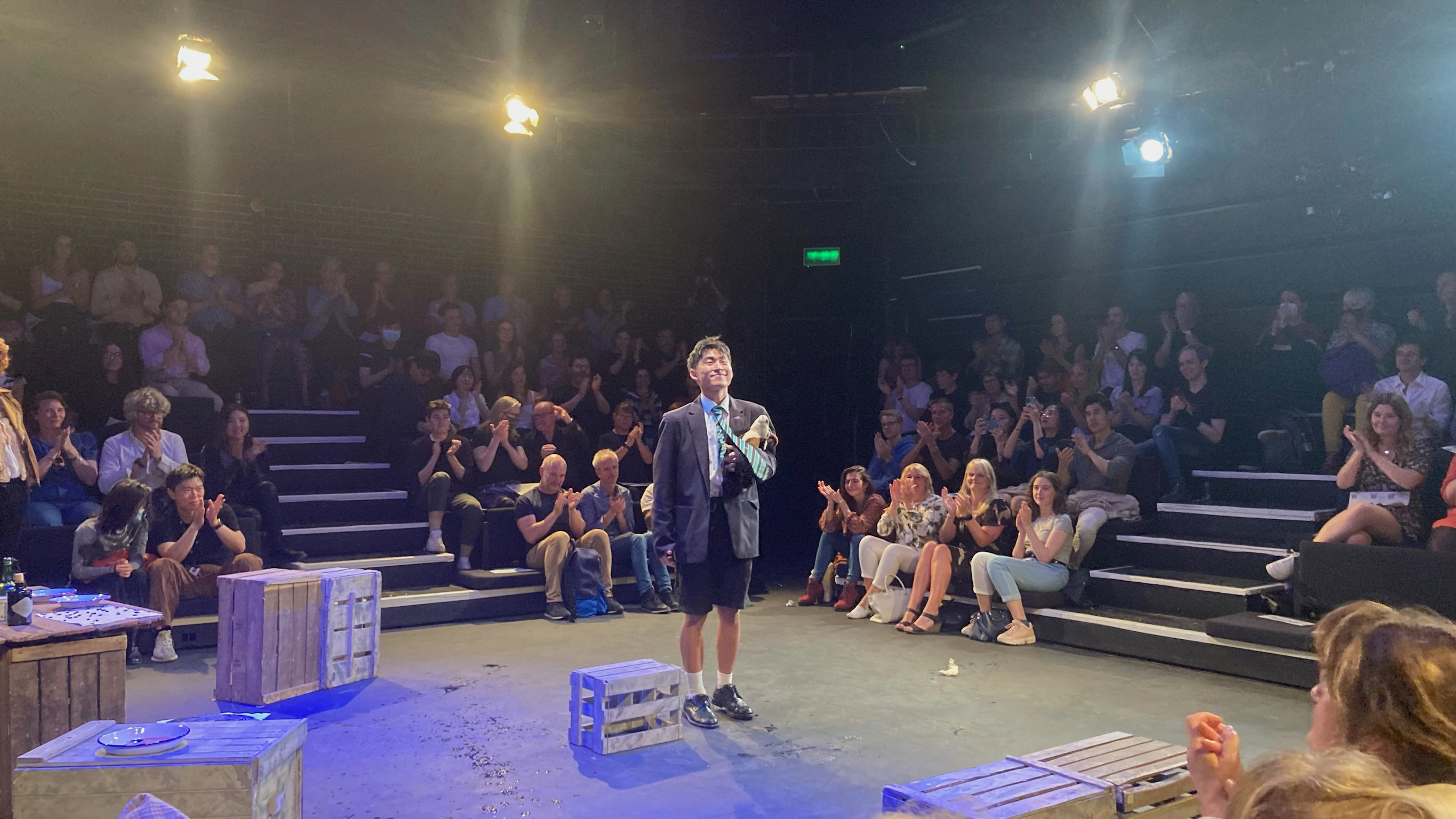
A 2022 production at the Cockpit Theatre, London

Tête à Tête initially presented the festival at Riverside Studios across three weeks in August, with a range of artists who are given free rein to present their work, some of which is still in progress. The Festival has taken place in the King's Cross area since 2015, with pop up performances taking place in libraries, museums, and other public places as a part of the Festival since 2017. The Festival has included over 400 new operas across over 1,000 performances, with 75,000 people seeing a performance in person or online.

In 2016, the company was awarded a UK Arts Online Award for its online archive of its performances, which is dominated by performances from the Festival. It is the largest online video resource of new opera in the world, reaching audiences in 155 countries.

Previous participants in the Festival include Oliver Mears, Kerry Andrew, Errollyn Wallen, Bishi, Jane Manning, Na'ama Zisser, CN Lester, Alastair White, and Ayanna Witter-Johnson.

In a review of two works presented at the 2010 festival by Rupert Christiansen, subtitled "Tete a Tete's annual Opera Festival is wonderfully random, and throws up some fine things", Christiansen wrote: "You never know quite what you're going to get or how good or bad it's going to be, and that's exactly as it should be."

== Past productions ==
Past productions have often been supported by the company's associate musical ensemble CHROMA and include:

- 1998–2000 The Flying Fox (Die Fledermaus) by Johann Strauss
- 1999–2001 Shorts, a collection of short operas including Platform 10 by Julian Grant and Christina Jones, Doggone by Gary Carpenter and Simon Nicholson, The Nightjar by Elfyn Jones and Toby Satterthwaite, Seven Tons of Dung by David Bruce and Bill Bankes-Jones, and Glue by Rachel Leach.
- 2000 Orlando Plays Mad (Orlando finto pazzo) by Vivaldi)
- 2002 Six Pack, a co-production with English National Opera. A collection of short operas including Jack & Jill by Rachel Leach and Jo Davies, Doorstepping Susannah by Helen Grime and Davey Moore, Odd Numbers by Julian Grant and Christina Jones, The Phone Call by John Webb and B. A. Diana, Has it Happened Yet? by David Bruce and Bill Bankes-Jones, and Waiting for Jack by Richard Taylor and Lynne Williams.
- 2002 The Canticles by Benjamin Britten, a co-production with Streetwise Opera
- 2003 Family Matters by Helen Chadwick, Pete Flood, Cheryl Francis-Hoad, Mike Henry, James Olsen, and John Webb, to a libretto by Amanda Holden
- 2005 A Shetland Odyssey by Julian Grant and Hattie Naylor
- 2006 Odysseus Unwound by Julian Grant and Hattie Naylor
- 2006 Push by David Bruce and Anna Reynolds
- 2007 Blind Date, a collection of short operas including Anger by Julian Grant and Meredith Oakes, On Such a Day by Anna Meredith and Philip Ridley, The Feathered Friend by Helen Chadwick and Alasdair Middleton, Houses by Christopher Mayo and Christopher Crebolder, and Nyanyushka by Gary Carpenter and Simon Nicholson (This was the first year of Tête à Tête: The Opera Festival).
- 2008 Lite Bites, a collection of short operas including Fairytale Relationship... yeh right by Laura Bowler and Alasdair Middleton, The Agony of the Knife Thrower's Assistant by Michael Henry and Adey Grummet, and Bumblepuppy by Evangelia Rigaki and W.N. Herbert.
- 2008 The Cumnor Affair: An Elizabethan Murder Mystery by Philip Cashian and Iain Pears.
- 2008 Johnny's Midnight Goggles
- 2009 Circus Tricks by Michael Henry and Adey Grummet
- 2009 Salad Days by Julian Slade and Dorothy Reynolds
- 2009 Lite Bites, a collection of short operas including Golden Years by Jordan Hunt and La JohnJoseph, Lear TV by Joanna Lee and Howard Skempton, The Inventor by Dominique Le Gendre, and Toxic Assets by Joe Cutler and Peter Burt.
- 2010/11 Salad Days (ran from November 2010 to February 2011 at Riverside Studios
- 2010 Icarus by Michal Zev Gordon and Stephen Plaice
- 2010 Lite Bites, a collection of short operas including Contact by Robert Fokkens, Just Bloody Schmooze the Woman! by Stephen Crowe, Only Connect by Julian Grant, and The General by Dominique Le Gendre
- 2011 Lite Bites, a collection of short operas including Everybody's Watching! (In Da Park) by Tom Floyd and David Spittle, New World by Samuel Bordoli and Mark Ravenhill, Sparklepuff by Gary Carpenter and Simon Nicholson, The Fox and the Crow by Charlotte Bray and Mark Ravenhill
- 2011 Love Songs by Robert Fokkens
- 2011 Daughters of the Elements by Stephen McNeff, with a verbatim libretto from Marie Curie and family.
- 2012 Great Expectations, a co-production with the Royal College of Music. A collection of short operas including I remember The Ship by Jude Obermuller and Genevieve Dawson, Gary of the Atlantic by Ed Bell, Lay Down and Stay by Michael Shearer and Claire Frewin, White Star by Chris Roe and Alex Knox, Aqualung by Louis d'Heudieres and Huw Crowley, and Una Tragedia Di Proporzione Titaniche by Laurence Osborn and Theo Merz.
- 2012 Amerika by Samuel Bordoli, after Franz Kafka's novel.
- 2012 Lite Bites, a collection of short operas including Caring in the Community by Ergo Phizmiz, Earthly Desires by Laurence Osborn and Theo Merz, Love Bytes by Cheryl Frances-Hoad and Tamsin Collison, Love Letter by Owen Bourne, and Circus Tricks by Michael Henry and Adey Grummet.
- 2013 Lite Bites, a collection of short operas including Cat-Astrophe by John Webb and Tamsin Collison, Dart's Love by Kerry Andrew and Tamsin Collison, Long Lankin by Fleur de Bray, Of My Daughter's Prayer by Will Handysides and Declan Kolakowskiy, and Recurrent by Matt Rogers and Sally O'Reilly.
- 2013 Gala by Ergo Phizmiz
- 2014, Hogarth's Stages, a co-production with the Royal College of Music. A collection of short operas including On False Perspective by Josephine Stephenson and Benjamin Osborne, The Bet by Algirdas Kraunatis, Now by Lewis Murphy and Laura Attridge, Hogarth's Bastards by Hunter Coblentz and Jordan O'Connor, and Serpentine, or The Analysis of Beauty by Edwin Hillier and Edward Allen.
- 2014, GRIND by Samuel Bordoli and Bill Bankes-Jones
- 2014, April in the Amazon by Laurence Osborn and Theo Merz
- 2014, Pop Up Operas, a collection of short operas including Cakehead by Errollyn Wallen, Precipitation by Helen Chadwick and Carl Miller, and Will You Fall by Na'ama Zisser and Stella Duffy.
- 2015, Bon Voyage, a happening by Catherine Kontz
- 2015, Pop Up Operas, a collection of short operas including My Mother My Daughter by Orlando Gough, Wake Up! by Ayanna Witter-Johnson and Susannah Waters, UnconGENIE-al by James Garner and Anna Pool, and Chuggers by Sophie Sparkes and Jenny Colgan
- 2015, People Watch by Stef Conner and Bill Bankes-Jones. A co-production with Streetwise Opera.
- 2015, The Last Seed by Na'ama Zisser and Stella Duffy
- 2016, Great Expectations, a co-production with the Royal College of Music. A collection of short operas including Stream of Consciousness, Sea of Blood by Benjamien Lycke and Mien Bogaert, 76 Days by Kenichi Ikuno Sekiguchi, BEL and the DRAGON by Alex Paxton, The Two Sisters by Algirdas Kraunatis and Grace Lee-Khoo, Der Eisenhut by Amy Bryce and Roland Karl Bryce, and Killer Graphics by Sam Hall and Darren Rapier
- 2016, Boys of Paradise by Vahan Salorian and Dominic Kimberlin. A co-production with WorkshOPERA
- 2017, Belongings by Samuel Bordoli and Bill Bankes-Jones. A co-production with SoundScotland
- 2017, Score! A medley of different works previously presented by Tête à Tête
- 2017, The Hive by Harvey Brough and Carole Hayman
- 2017, Bohememergency, a parody of Puccini's La Bohème, with music arranged by Timothy Burke and a translation by Bill Bankes-Jones (originally named 'Surprise Package')
- 2018, Frankenstein - The Modern Prometheus, a co-production with the Royal College of Music. A collection of short operas, including Amira by Joe Kiely, Our Perfect Child by Sophie Sparkes and Deborah McMahon, John Henry by Maeve McCarthy and Gary Matthewman, Bear & Friends by Lente Verelst and Hans Vercauteren, and The Fermi Paradox by Lara Poe and Raphael Ruiz.
- 2018, TOSCATASTROPHE!, a parody of Puccini's Tosca, with music arranged by Timothy Burke and a translation by Bill Bankes-Jones.
- 2019, Pop Up Operas, a collection of short operas including Aliens in the Streets by Vahan Salorian and Dominic Kimberlin, Hand Clap by Catherine Kontz and Emmylou Vaxby, and We Did Our Best by Anna Appleby and Ruth Mariner.
- 2019, Madame Butterflop, a parody of Puccini's Madame Butterfly, with music arranged by Timothy Burke and a translation by Bill Bankes-Jones.
