= Michael Corder =

British choreographer and director

Michael Corder (born 17 March 1955) is a British choreographer and director.

Corder trained at the Royal Ballet School and joined the Royal Ballet itself in 1973.
