= Stanza Poetry Festival =

Poetry festival in St. Andrews, Scotland

StAnza is a poetry festival that takes place annually in March in the university town of St Andrews, Scotland. The Times newspaper referred to StAnza as "the country's leading poetry festival" in 2024.

Described by The Guardian as a "flaming good poetry festival", StAnza has run every year since its inception in 1998, barring 2020 when it was interrupted by the COVID-19 pandemic. In 2021, StAnza ran as an online-only festival due to ongoing COVID restrictions, and now continues to offer both in-person and online events as part of an ongoing hybrid programme.

The festival uses as a hub the Byre Theatre in St Andrews, and regularly programmes events in other venues around the town.

== History ==
From 1998 to 2002, StAnza was held in October of each year. However, in 2003 the festival changed to a regular March fixture.

In advance of the 2024 festival, a Moroccan poet who had been booked to perform was denied a visa by the Home Office. Soukaina Habiballah was due to appear as part of "Resilient Voices: Celebrating Middle Eastern Women in the Arts", but was initially blocked entry to the UK, on the grounds that she could be considered a flight risk. The Home Office revised their decision shortly before the festival, after coming under pressure from public figures.
