= Bill Bankes-Jones =

British opera director

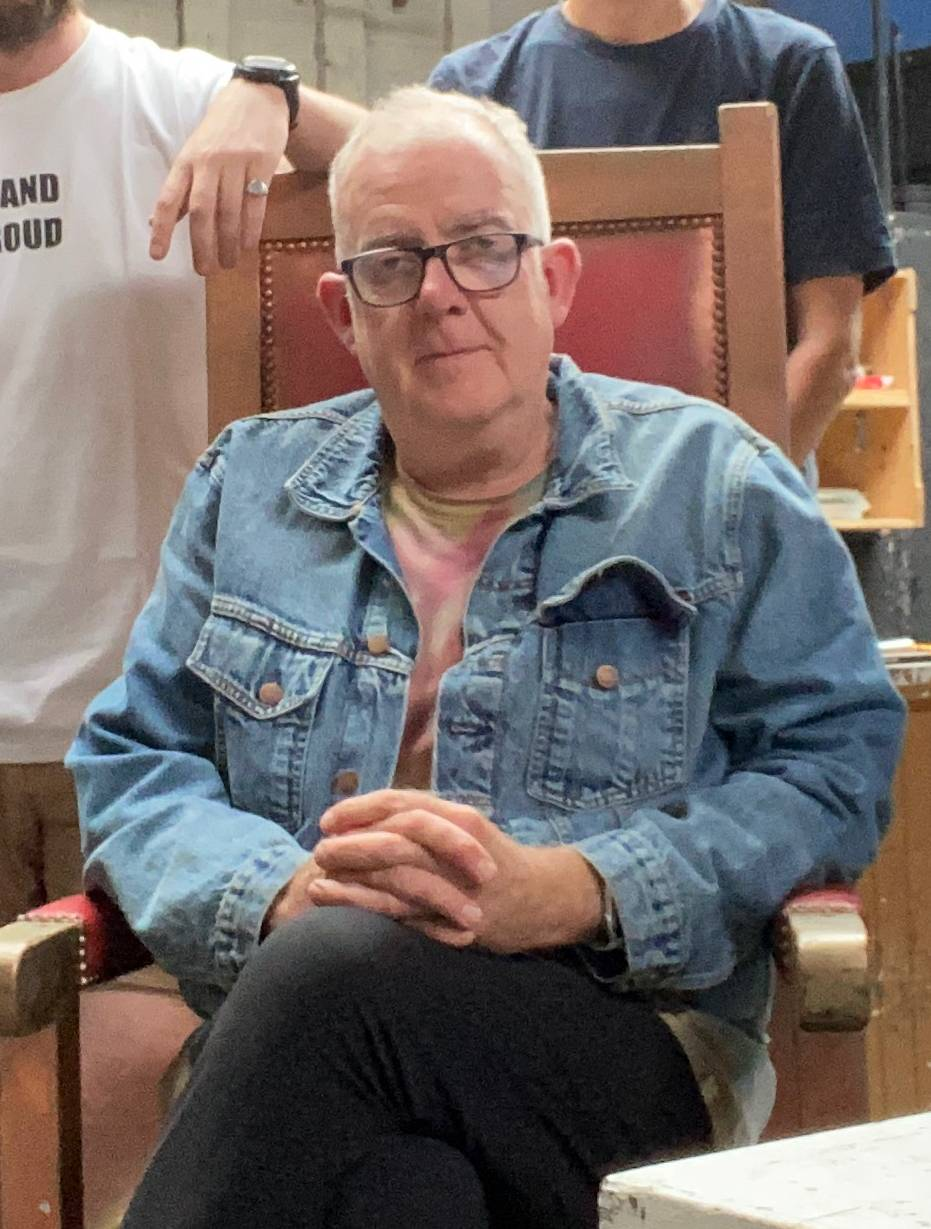
Bankes-Jones in 2022

William Michael Roger Bankes-Jones BEM (born 1963), known professionally as Bill Bankes-Jones, is a British opera director and artistic director and founder of Tête à Tête. He is best known for his work in new opera, having directed over 100 world premieres during his career.

He studied philosophy at the University of Saint Andrews before joining the ITV regional theatre young directors' scheme, working at the Thorndike Theatre and the Redgrave Theatre.

He went on to become a staff director at English National Opera in 1991 before founding Tête à Tête in 1997. He has continued as artistic director since then, leading the company's expansion and creation of Tête à Tête: The Opera Festival in 2006. He has since described his intention in creating the Festival as a showcase for new work in a period when there were very few new operas being done, to confront perceptions of opera as exclusive and to establish a fringe for opera. It has become associated with the emergence of trends such as gig theatre, composer-performer collectives and gallery opera.

In 2012, he was listed in the Evening Standard's 1000 Most Influential Londoners for his work on the Festival. The citation praised the Festival as "the place to experience the latest triumphs and occasional spectacular failures of the genre."

He has also worked with the Royal Opera, the BBC, Scottish Opera, and the Royal College of Music. He was the Chair of the Opera and Music Theatre Forum 2002-2023.

In 2017 he directed the world premiere of Belongings, for which he was also the librettist. It was the first opera to be performed on a Caledonian Sleeper Service.

In 2020, he was involved in the Department for Digital, Culture, Media, and Sport's pilot performance for the safe return of opera during the COVID-19 pandemic as Tête à Tête's Artistic Director, and worked on ensuring that year's Festival went ahead safely. He was awarded a British Empire Medal in that year's Queen's Birthday Honours for "services to Opera and Diversity."
