= Stephen Plaice =

UK-based dramatist and scriptwriter (born 1951)

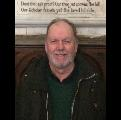
- Born: 9 September 1951 (age 75)
- Occupations: Dramatist and scriptwriter

Stephen Plaice (born 9 September 1951) is a UK-based dramatist and scriptwriter who has written extensively for theatre, opera and television. In 2014 he was appointed Writer in Residence at the Guildhall School of Music and Drama. He became Professor of Dramatic Writing at the school in 2018.

His historical novel, set in the Middle Ages, 'The Hardham Divine' was published by Parvenu Press in 2021.

== Early career ==
Stephen Plaice was born in Watford UK in 1951 and attended Watford Grammar School for Boys. He went on to study German and Comparative Literature at the Universities of Sussex, Marburg and Zurich. An extensive account of his student days in Germany was given in The Romantic Road, a series of five programmes broadcast by BBC Radio 4 in 2009 and repeated in 2016. He was co-translator of Ernst Bloch's The Principle of Hope (Blackwell 1986) and of Bloch's Heritage of our Time (Blackwell 1991). In the 1980s, with the poet Sean O'Brien, he was co-founder of the literary magazine The Printer's Devil.

== Playwright ==
Plaice began his playwriting career as a translator of German plays at the Royal National Theatre in the 1970s. In the 1980s he formed his own theatre companies, the short-lived Thumbscrew Theatre, and then Alarmist Theatre with the theatre director, the late Helena Bell. Alarmist produced many of Plaice's plays and adaptations including his version of Vladimir Mayakovsky's The Bedbug which, with the help of the British Council, was taken to Moscow by the company in 1990, one of the first British productions to be performed under perestroika. Later in the Nineties, Plaice worked frequently with Shaker Productions, a theatre company based at the Hawth Theatre in Crawley, run by Alison Edgar. Edgar's 1993 production of Trunks, Plaice's play about the Brighton Trunk Murders of 1934, was a critical success. and transferred to Battersea Arts Centre and to the Lyric Theatre Studio Hammersmith before going on to tour nationally. It was successfully revived in expanded form in the Paganini Ballroom, Barcelo Brighton Old Ship Hotel, in 2008. His short play The Last Post originally produced by Shaker was made into a film by Sarah Radclyffe Productions in 1995 and nominated for a BAFTA. The film was directed by Ed Blum.

From 1987 Plaice was Writer-in-Residence at Lewes Prison, where he did the research for Trunks, and also for Prometheus Unlocked, a play about a prison arsonist. It was also here that his association with Glyndebourne Festival Opera began, after he invited a team from the Education Department to run annual workshops in the prison. In 1994, after seven years, Plaice left the prison residency and began writing scripts for ITV's The Bill, scripting more than twenty episodes. Plaice has also worked extensively with the Education Department of the Berlin Philharmonic, most notably in 2004 with inmates in Plötzensee Prison in Berlin on a project entitled Seven Doors, based on Bartók's Bluebeard's Castle.

After working in opera for most of the decade, in 2008 Plaice returned to straight drama and wrote Nemesis, a play which documented the extraordinary marriage between John and Ada Galsworthy. John had been a visitor to Lewes Prison in the early 1900s. The play was given a rehearsed reading at the Minerva Theatre, Chichester. Mick and Me, about the author's imaginary friendship with a famous rock star in the 1960s, was given a rehearsed reading at Watford Palace Theatre in 2009. In 2012 he wrote Wyatt, a three-hander about Henry VIII, Anne Boleyn and the Tudor poet Thomas Wyatt. This was followed by The Branch, about the British Education Branch's role in the denazification of post-war Germany. To date, none of these plays has been produced.

The White Cat, an hour-long play for GCSE drama students, was first performed by Peacehaven Community School in 2014. Its subject is the Dallington witch scare in early 17th century Sussex.

In 2014 Plaice wrote and directed The Gospel According to Lilian, about the visitation of Anglican nuns by the spirit of Mary Magdalene in the 1950s. This was produced as part of the Church of the Annunciation Festival in Brighton. In 2018, Plaice wrote Carriages at Midnight, a three-hander exploring the relationship between Robert and Clara Schumann and Johannes Brahms. This has not yet been produced.

== Opera ==
In 1996 the Glyndebourne opera company produced the first of Plaice's librettos, the children's opera Misper, written with the composer John Lunn. There were further collaborations with Lunn for the youth opera, Zoë in 2000 (made into a film for Channel 4 later that same year, directed by Theresa Griffith) and Tangier Tattoo in 2005, both produced at Glyndebourne. These operas were all directed by Stephen Langridge with whom Plaice has enjoyed a long working relationship. Richard Morrison of The Times (London) wrote that the creative team 'virtually redefined the genre with their splendidly feisty Misper at Glyndebourne.... Zoe by the same team is a giant leap forward again'. However, Tangier Tattoo, an opera set against a background of jihadist kif-smuggling in Morocco, and ostensibly created for a target audience of 20- to 30-year-olds, was less favourably received by the critics.

In 2012 Glyndebourne Education produced Lovers Walk, a chamber opera composed by Luke Styles to a libretto by Plaice. This was followed by the main stage community opera Imago, composed by Orlando Gough to another Plaice libretto. The latter was widely acclaimed, with Antony Craig of Gramophone describing it as 'an operatic love story for our digital age'. It went on to win the Royal Philharmonic Society Music Awards for Learning and Participation for 2013, the second time one of Plaice's operas has won the RPS education award, the first being for Confucius Says with Hackney Music Development Trust in 2008 (see below).

Plaice's first collaboration with Sir Harrison Birtwistle came in 2003. It was the chamber opera The Io Passion, which was also directed by Langridge and which opened the Aldeburgh Festival and toured to Bregenz later in the year. The Independent on Sunday praised "Stephen Plaice's beautifully organised libretto". Plaice also wrote the text for Birtwistle's carol The Gleam for the choir of Kings College Cambridge for The Festival of Nine Lessons and Carols in 2003. In the same year, Plaice was commissioned to write the libretto for "Rainland", a large scale choral drama composed by Joseph Phibbs. This was premiered at the Royal Albert Hall and has had subsequent performances at the Cheltenham Festival and at WASBE, the international windband festival in Kilarney.

The libretto for Birtwistle's dramatic oratorio Angel Fighter was written by Plaice in 2010. It premiered in the Thomaskirche at the Bachfest Leipzig (de) to positive reviews: "a major work, one which points to a new direction for sacred music.....Birtwistle transforms the text, which Stephen Plaice has created for him in simple, magnificent, vivid sentences of Lutheran vehemence, into a seven-part arch form, a dramatic cantata, a compact oratorio". The UK premiere of this work took place on 20 August 2011 as a part of the BBC Proms. Paint Me a chamber opera with the Portuguese composer Luis Tinoco was premiered in Lisbon in 2010, a Teatro Nacional de São Carlos / Culturgest co-production.

In 2006, Plaice scripted a hip-hop adaptation of Mozart's Così fan tutte for Glyndebourne under the title of School4Lovers. This production toured to the Finnish National Opera in Helsinki and to the Estonia Theatre in Tallinn. Orlando Gough's The Finnish Prisoner was set to Plaice's libretto in 2007. A co-production between Finnish National Opera and the Lewes-based company, The Paddock, the subject matter was the incarceration of Finnish prisoners in the now demolished Naval Prison at Lewes during the Crimean War. The opera was directed by Susannah Waters. Along with the composer Richard Taylor, Plaice wrote the children's opera Confucius Says in 2008 for Hackney Music Development Trust. This won the Royal Philharmonic Society Music Awards for Education in that year. He collaborated again with Taylor on Ludd and Isis, a community opera commissioned for the opening of the new Royal Opera House Production Park in Thurrock in late 2010.

Hot House, an opera about the Covent Garden Theatre's Old Price Riots of 1809 with music by Julian Grant, was commissioned by the Education Department of the Royal Opera House as part of the Cultural Olympics and premiered on the main stage in July 2012. Plaice's opera-theatre piece In & Out of Love, a sequence of opera duets embedded into a narrative about two singers and starring Marcia Bellamy and Red Gray, toured the South East of England in the spring of 2013 and also in 2014 in an expanded version. This RedBlonde production was followed in 2015 by Bouffe, again featuring Bellamy and Gray, together with Lila Palmer and John Grave. This told the story of the diva Hortense Schneider's rise to prominence in Offenbach's Bouffes Parisiens. This was successfully revived in the Brighton Festival in 2016.

In 2016, Plaice was commissioned by the Guildhall School of Music and Drama to create a new operatic adaptation of Chaucer's The Merchant's Tale with composer Julian Philips. Plaice developed his libretto for this new opera, The Tale of Januarie, in Chaucerian Middle English and the opera was premiered to wide acclaim in spring 2017. Also in 2017, with the composer Jamie Mann, Plaice created Counting Sheep, one of the ten Snappy Operas that Mahagonny Opera Group produced in designated schools throughout the UK. In 2018, for Surrey Arts, with the composer Joanna Lee, Plaice wrote No Sound Ever Dies, a sonic suite that explores the glamorous era of the Brooklands racing circuit. With Orlando Gough, Plaice has written a new 'state of the nation' community opera for Hastings and Bexhill-on-Sea with Barefoot Opera, entitled Bloom Britannia'. This received a successful platform performance at the De La Warr Pavilion in April 2019. The full version was staged at St Mary's in the Castle in October 2021. A new opera Raising Icarus created with the composer Michael Zev Gordon was premièred at the Birmingham Rep in April 2022. Andrew Clements in the Guardian declared it to be 'a high-flying chamber opera that packs a punch'. In 2019/20 a new children's 'post truth' opera Henny Penny, music by Julian Philips, was developed to tour schools in Islington, as part of an OWRI/AHRC initiative to promote the teaching of foreign languages. As a result of Covid, it has been adapted as an animation by Positivenote, so that it can be used as a classroom teaching aid outside the workshop context. The opera was finally premièred at the Crucible Theatre as part of the Sheffield Chamber Music Festival on May 23rd 2026.

During the COVID-19 pandemic, Plaice was rapidly commissioned by Glyndebourne to adapt Jacques Offenbach's opera buffa Mesdames de la Halle for performance in the gardens at the Sussex opera house. The new version is entitled In the Market for Love or Onions are Forever. The vocal setting of the operetta was made by Marcia Bellamy. The production, directed by Stephen Langridge and starring Danielle de Niese, Allan Clayton, Matthew Rose, Kate Lindsey, Nicky Spence, Brendan Gunnell and Michael Wallace, opened to great acclaim on 12 August 2020. It was brought into the main theatre in October 2020 and was given another eight performances.

In 2022 Glyndebourne commissioned Plaice and Bellamy to produce a new English adaptation of Franz Lehár's operetta The Merry Widow for the 2024 Glyndebourne Festival. Directed by Cal McCrystal, it received seventeen performances, starring Danielle de Niese as the Widow, Gérman Olvera as Danilo, and Sir Thomas Allen as Baron Zeta.The production was filmed by Maestro live at Glyndebourne, directed by Rhodri Hugh. It was broadcast on BBC4 on Christmas Day in 2024 and immediately included in their selection of Great Performances on I Player.

In 2025 Plaice collaborated with the composer David Buckley on a chamber opera Oracle, commissioned by the NOF Festival in Fribourg Switzerland. A full orchestral version of the opera was recorded by the BBC Concert Orchestra at Alexandra Palace on May 20, 2025. The opera was premièred in Fribourg on June 22, 2025. It concluded with a 'deus ex machina', voiced by Stephen Fry. The opera was given a single semi-staged performance at the Queen Elizabeth Hall on 3rd October 2026. Under the strapline - 'the AI apolcalypse is here and it's brilliant', The Times critic Richard Morrison described it as 'Highly entertaining and not a minute too long, it deserves more performances in the future. If there is a future.'

With Marcia Bellamy, Stephen has been commissioned by the Longborough Festival to write a new adaptation of Otto Nicolai's opera "The Merry Wives of Windsor" based on Shakespeare's comedy. There will be six performances at the festival in 2027, from June 26th to July 10th.

== Music theatre ==
Plaice has also written for music theatre. He collaborated with Yusuf Islam on the early drafts of Moonshadow, the Cat Stevens musical, and took over the book of Daddy Cool, the Frank Farian musical, starring Michelle Collins, Harvey and Javine, which was staged at the Shaftesbury Theatre in 2006 before transferring to a purpose-built Theaterpalast in Berlin the following year. In 2009, with the composer Richard Taylor, he adapted Rudyard Kipling's The Jungle Book for the Castle Theatre, Wellingborough, and this was followed at the Castle in 2010 with a musical adaptation of Robin Hood, with the composer Grant Olding. Plaice is currently collaborating with the writer Zoe Palmer to create a musical about Will Marion Cook, the first composer to bring black musicals to Broadway. This is provisionally entitled 'Darktown is Out Tonight'. This is in development at the Guildhall School of Music and Drama. 'String', a community opera for Hailsham, book and lyrics by Stephen, music by Tony Biggin, was premiered in a show case production in the Hailsham Festival in September 2021. It was narrated by the poet Roger McGough. It returned to the town in October 2022, with John Bowler as the narrator, for three further performances. It was revived at the Grove Theatre, Eastbourne in February 2024.

== List of works ==
=== Plays ===
- 1986: Young Faust
- 1987: Leonce and Lena (adaptation)
- 1987: Prometheus Unlocked
- 1990: The Bedbug (adaptation)
- 1993: Trunks
- 1995: Home Truths
- 1995: The Last Post
- 1996: The Shortlist
- 1997: The Milk Train
- 2008: Nemesis
- 2009: Mick and Me
- 2012: Wyatt
- 2012: The Branch
- 2014: The White Cat
- 2014: The Gospel According to Lilian
- 2018: Carriages at Midnight

=== Libretti ===
- 1996: Misper
- 2000: Zöe
- 2003: Rainland
- 2004: The Io Passion
- 2005: Tangier Tattoo
- 2006: School4Lovers
- 2007: The Finnish Prisoner
- 2008: Confucius Says
- 2010: Angel Fighter
- 2010: The Moon on A Stick
- 2010: Ludd and Isis
- 2010: Paint Me
- 2012: Hot House
- 2012: Lovers Walk
- 2013: Imago
- 2016: The Tale of Januarie
- 2017: Counting Sheep
- 2018: No Sound Ever Dies
- 2022: Raising Icarus
- 2025: Oracle
- 2026: Henny Penny
- 2027: The Merry Wives of Windsor

=== Musicals ===
- 1995: Race the Devil (Glyndebourne Education)
- 2006: Daddy Cool (with Amani Napthali)
- 2009: The Jungle Book (adaptation)
- 2010: Robin Hood (adaptation)
- 2021: String

=== Operetta ===
- 2013: In and Out of Love
- 2015: Bouffe
- 2020: In the Market for Love (Onions are Forever)
- 2024: The Merry Widow (with Marcia Bellamy)

=== Poetry ===
- 1983: Rumours of Cousins (Yorick Books)
- 1992: Over the Rollers (Yorick Books)
- 2016: The Fonthill Poets (edited with Martyn Ford) (Parvenu Press)
- 2018: Those Under Saturn: Selected Poems

=== Fiction ===
● 2021:The Hardham Divine (Parvenu Press)

=== History ===
- 2014: The Real Presence (The Church of the Annunciation)
