= Silent Opera =

Silent Opera is a London-based opera company which builds upon the concept of the silent disco, where audience members can either listen to the opera live, backed by performers on six instruments, or can wear headphones to hear a pre-recorded full orchestral performance of the opera they are watching. The lack of a full orchestra means the group can perform in unusually small spaces that would not normally be able to accommodate a full operatic orchestra.

Silent Opera have produced L'Orfeo, Il Barbiere di Siviglia, La traviata, Dido and Aeneas and La bohème.
