= Schön! =

Fashion magazine

Schön! Magazine

- Schön! 14 (September 2011), featuring Andreja Pejic
- Editor: Raoul Keil
- Fashion Editor: Huma Humayun
- Online Editor: Kelsey Barnes
- Categories: Fashion and lifestyle magazine
- Frequency: Biannual
- Circulation: 115,000 in 2012
- Founded: 2009
- Company: Schön! Publishing GmbH (was Schon Publishing Ltd.)
- Country: UK
- Based in: London
- Language: English
- Website: schonmagazine.com

Schön! (German pronunciation: [ʃøːn], "Beautiful!") is an English-language fashion magazine, launched in June 2009, and currently based in London. It is a biannual publication and is available in print, as well as online, iPad and iPhone and for download on the magazine's website.

According to its website, its goal is "showcasing a dynamic and diverse array of ideas and talent" in art and fashion. In a recent survey conducted by the magazine, its readership is 45% male, 55% female, and the median age is 28 years. 56% earn more than £125,000 ($189,300 USD) a year. The magazine was distributed in 2012 with 115,000 copies into 43 countries, and has recently arrived in China and Brazil.

Its Editor-in-Chief and Creative Director is Raoul Keil, its Fashion Editor is Huma Humayun, and its Online Editor is Kelsey Barnes.

== History ==
Schön! began as an online magazine intended to showcase the work of the online creative community Nineteen74.com, a 2009 Official Webby Honoree. It reflected the community's global scale by featuring articles, photos and work from each of the continents from which members of the community hailed. In the first few issues, features and articles were organized in terms of their continent of origin, but as the online community grew, so did the scope of the magazine. More recently, the magazine has dropped such formatting.

The magazine has included models such as Andrej Pejic, Tony Ward, and Victoria's Secret Angel Alessandra Ambrosio. Celebrities such as Kathy Griffin, Ivana Baquero, and Maddie Ziegler have appeared in recent issues.

=== Issues ===
- Schön! 1: Enlighten Your Senses, cover art - "Geometric Homicide" by Robert G. Bartholot
- Schön! 2: Be Intoxicated, cover art - "Solweig" by Cyril Lagel
- Schön! 3: Get Hypnotized, cover art - "Me" by Bruna Rotunno
- Schön! 4: Be Thrilled, cover art - "The Six Continents" by Dimitris Theocharis
- Schön! 5: Rock Your World, cover art - "Alessandra the Great" by Jannis Tsipoulanis
- Schön! 6: Taste It, cover art - "Blink" by Dimitris Theocharis
- Schön! 7: Get Addicted, cover art - "Loren" by Jannis Tsipoulanis
- Schön! 8: Just a Dream?, cover art - "Wunderkinder" by Jannis Tsipoulanis
- Schön! 9: Tony Ward, cover art - "Tony Ward" by Dimitris Theocharis
- Schön! 10: More Future Please!, cover art - "Mrs. Indiana Jones" by Jannis Tsipoulanis
- Schön! 11: Sparkle!, cover art - "Lightness of Being" by Chris Levine
- Schön! 12: Let the Sun Shine, cover art - "Miami Bitch" by Dimitris Theocharis
- Schön! 13: Lucky Thirteen, dual covers - "Flesh, Flags and Fatigues" by Tiziano Magni and "My Name is Neff - Garrett Neff" by Phillip Mueller
- Schön! 14: Strike!, dual covers - "Allure" by Christos Karantzolas and "Undercover" by Matthew Lyn
- Schön! 15: Sam Webb by Dimitris Theocharis and Daisy Lowe by Yuval Hen
- Schön! 16: David Gandy by Dimitris Theocharis and Kat Cordts by Pierre Dal Corso
- Schön! 17: Crystal Renn by Ellen von Unwerth
- Schön! 18: Naomi Campbell by Ellen von Unwerth
- Schön! 19: Isabeli Fontana by Gustavo Zylbersztajn
- Schön! 20: The Future is Now, cover art - Tian Yi & Chrystal Copland by Christos Karantzolas
- Schön! 21: #HOT, four covers - Cassandra Smith by Miguel Starcevich, Tony Ward by Paul Scala, Sean O'Pry by Jack Waterlot, Rihanna by Zoe McConnell
- Schön! 22: Coco Rocha by Rayan Ayash
- Schön! 23: Aline Weber by Tiziano Magni
- Schön! 24: Gigi Hadid by Rayan Ayash
- Schön! 25: Eva Doll by Rayan Ayash
- Schön! 26: Lucy Liu by Markus & Koala
- Schön! 27: Brooke Candy by Michael Flores & Nicola Formichetti
- Schön! 28: Maddie Ziegler by Jack Waterlot & Coline Bach
- Schön! 29: Iman by Tiziano Magni
- Schön! 30: Iggy Azalea by Jacques Dequeker
- Schön! 31: Elle Fanning by Floria Sigismondi
- Schön! 32: Ajak Deng by Alexander Saladrigas
- Schön! 33: Taja Feistner by Alexander Saladrigas
- Schön! 34: Sophia Lilis by Elizaveta Porodina
- Schön! 35: Rosalía (singer) by Vince Aung
- Schön! 36: H.E.R by Oriana Layendecker
- Schön! 37: Kristine Froseth by Nick Hudson (It is the magazine's tenth anniversary edition)
