= Helsinki Festival =

The Helsinki Festival (in Finnish: Helsingin juhlaviikot, in Swedish: Helsingfors festspel) is the largest multi-arts festival in Finland. It is Finland's biggest cultural event in terms of visitors. In 2015, around 295,000 people visited the Helsinki Festival.

The Helsinki Festival was established in its present form in 1968 by the City of Helsinki to follow up and to broaden the supply of culture in the mainly classical music festival then called "Sibelius viikot" ("Sibelius weeks"). The original "Sibelius viikot" festival was active from 1951 to 1965.

The Helsinki Festival is an annual event, in August. The festival offers hundreds of performances and events in the Finnish capital city of Helsinki.

The performances consist of theater, music, dance, art exhibitions, circus, movies, children's programs and various forms of other culture. Numerous renowned international artists have also been performing at the Helsinki Festival. Many of the performances are free. One of the main events is called "Night of the Arts" (Taiteiden yö), when all the city is open for anyone to perform outdoors in the parks and streets of Helsinki.

The main concerts are at the large festival tent called Huvila Festival tent which is built every year in one of the parks in Helsinki. Today, theater has a big role in the festival and many (also international) performances are held at the Korjaamo Culture factory in Töölö in Helsinki.
