= Javier Marías bibliography =

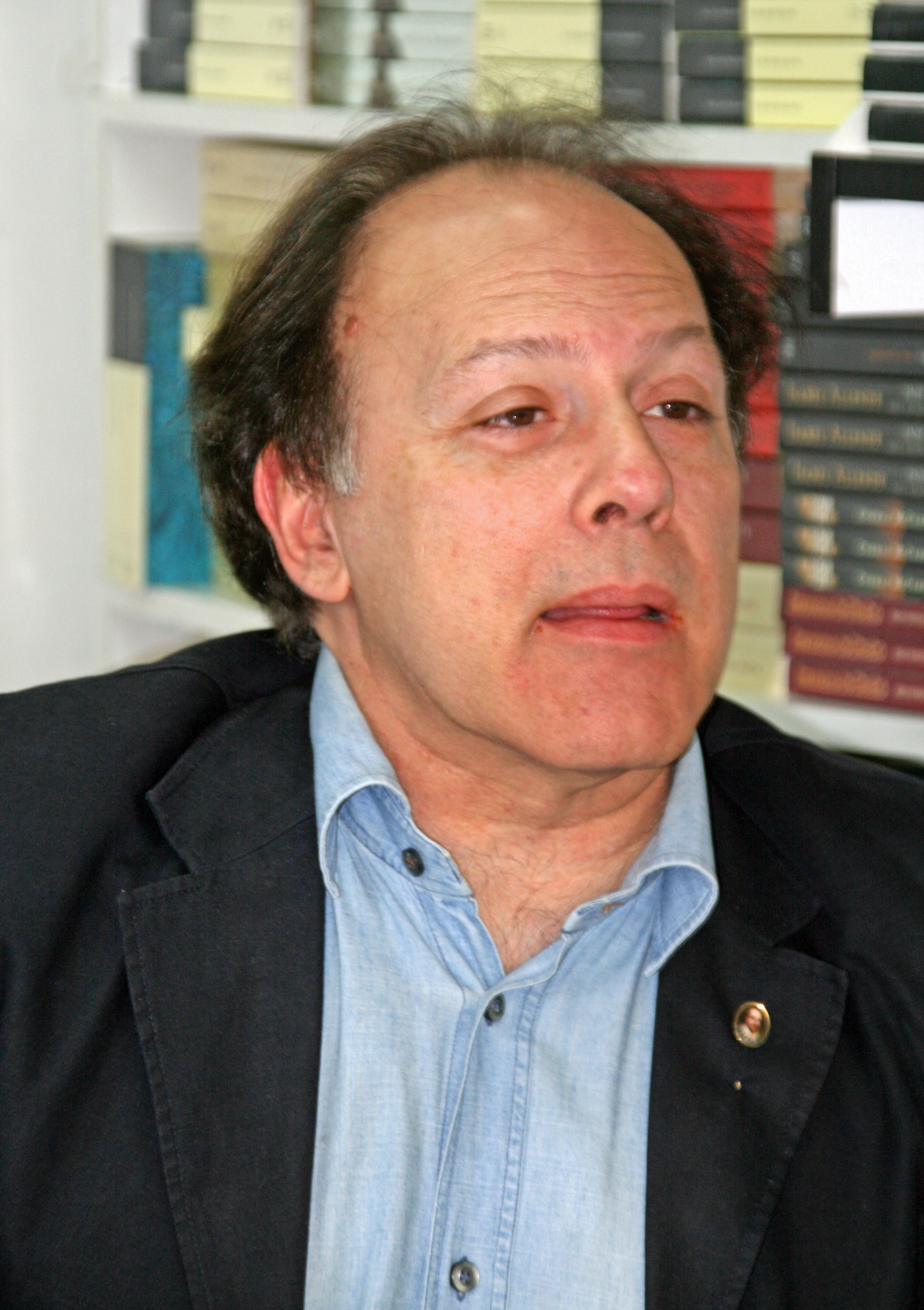
Javier Marías in 2008

Javier Marías (1951 – 2022) was a Spanish novelist, translator and columnist. The son of the philosopher Julián Marías and the writer and translator Dolores Franco Manera, he published his first novel, Los dominios del lobo, by the age of 19. He went on to publish fourteen more novels, including A Heart So White (1992) and Tomorrow in the Battle Think on Me. In the 1970s, he began to write columns, which featured in both El País and also the newspapers belonging to Vocento, although he later claimed that he had fallen victim to censorship and abandoned the latter. The columns were later assembled into several books. He also translated several works into Spanish, including novels, tales and poems, such as The Life and Opinions of Tristram Shandy, Gentleman by Laurence Sterne and some poems by Vladimir Nabokov. In Written Lives, he collected biographical sketches of famous literary figures, amongst whom were Djuna Barnes, Joseph Conrad, Arthur Conan Doyle and Giuseppe Tomasi di Lampedusa. His books, translated from Spanish into 45 languages, sold 8 million copies all over the world. Marías was elected as an academic by the Real Academia Española and took up the R seat from 2008 until his death in 2022.

== Novels ==
Novels by Javier Marías
Title	Year of first publication	First edition publisher	Notes	Ref.
Los dominios del lobo	1971	Edhasa		
Travesía del horizonte	1972	La Gaya Ciencia		
El monarca del tiempo	1978	Alfaguara		
El siglo	1983	Seix Barral		
El hombre sentimental	1986	Anagrama		
Todas las almas	1989	Anagrama		
Corazón tan blanco	1992	Anagrama	Published in English with the title A Heart So White	
Mañana en la batalla piensa en mí	1994	Anagrama	Published in English with the title Tomorrow in the Battle Think on Me	
Negra espalda del tiempo	1998	Alfaguara	Published in English with the title Dark Back of Time	
Tu rostro mañana 1. Fiebre y lanza	2002	Alfaguara	First installment in the Tu rostro mañana series. Published in English with the title Your Face Tomorrow Volume 1: Fever and Spear.	
Tu rostro mañana 2. Baile y sueño	2004	Alfaguara	Second installment in the Tu rostro mañana series. Published in English with the title Your Face Tomorrow Volume 2: Dance and Dream.	
Tu rostro mañana 3. Veneno y sombra y adiós	2007	Alfaguara	Third installment in the Tu rostro mañana series. Published in English with the title Your Face Tomorrow Volume 3: Poison, Shadow and Farewell.	
Los enamoramientos	2011	Alfaguara	Published in English with the title The Infatuations	
Así empieza lo malo	2014	Alfaguara		
Berta Isla	2017	Alfaguara		
Tomás Nevinson	2021	Alfaguara		

== Short stories ==
Short stories and short story collections by Javier Marías
Title	Year of first publication	First edition publisher	Notes	Ref.
La dimisión de Santiesteban	1975	La Gaya Ciencia	A short story included in the anthology Tres cuentos didácticos, alongside another two short stories by Félix de Azúa and Vicente Molina Foix	
Mientras ellas duermen	1990	Anagrama	A collection of short stories	
Todo mal vuelve	1994	Anagrama	Included in Cuentos europeos, a collection which features short stories by various authors	
Cuando fui mortal	1996	Alfaguara	Published in English with the title When I Was Mortal	
No más amores	1997	Alfaguara		
Mala índole	1998	Plaza & Janés	Subtitled Cuentos aceptados y aceptables	

== Article collections ==
Article collections by Javier Marías
Title	Year of first publication	First edition publisher	Notes	Ref.
Pasiones pasadas	1991	Anagrama		
Vida del fantasma	1992	El País/Aguilar		
Literatura fantasma	1993	Siruela	A collection of articles focused on literature	
Mano de sombra	1997	Alfaguara		
Seré amado cuando falte	1999	Alfaguara		
A veces un caballero	2001	Alfaguara		
Harán de mí un criminal	2003	Alfaguara		
El oficio de oír llover	2005	Alfaguara		
Donde todo ha sucedido. Al salir del cine	2005	Galaxia Gutenberg		
Demasiada nieve alrededor	2007	Alfaguara		
Aquella mitad de mi tiempo. Al mirar atrás	2008	Galaxia Gutenberg		
Lo que no vengo a decir	2009	Alfaguara		
Los villanos de la nación. Letras de política y sociedad	2010	Libros del Lince		
Ni se les ocurra disparar	2011	Alfaguara		
Lección pasada de moda. Letras de lengua	2012	Galaxia Gutenberg		
Tiempos ridículos	2013	Alfaguara		
Juro no decir nunca la verdad	2015	Alfaguara		
Cuando los tontos mandan	2018	Alfaguara		
Cuando la sociedad es el tirano	2019	Alfaguara		
¿Será buena persona el cocinero?	2022	Alfaguara		

== Translations ==
Translations by Javier Marías
Title	Year of first publication	First edition publisher	Notes	Ref.
El brazo marchito y otros relatos	1974	Alianza Editorial	Translation of "The Withered Arm" and other tales by Thomas Hardy	
La vida y las opiniones del caballero Tristram Shandy. Los sermones de Mr. Yorick	1978	Alfaguara	Translation of the novel The Life and Opinions of Tristram Shandy, Gentleman by Laurence Sterne	
La felicidad de vivir con la naturaleza. El diario de Edith B. Holden	1979	Blume	Translation of poems by Edith Holden	
Desde que te vi morir	1979	Poesía and then Alfaguara	Translation of eighteen poems by Vladimir Nabokov featured in Poems and Problems for their inclusion in Desde que te vi morir, written by Marías to mark the 100th anniversary of the Russian authors birth	
Fragmentos	1979	Poesía	Translation of a poem by Frank O'Hara	
Si yo amaneciera otra vez	1979‍–‍80	Poesía	Translation of twelve poems by William Faulkner	
De vuelta del mar	1980	Hiperión	Translation of a selection of poems by Robert Louis Stevenson	
El espejo del mar	1981	Hiperión	Translation of the essay The Mirror of the Sea by Joseph Conrad, with a foreword by Juan Benet	
Ehrengard	1984	Bruguera	Translation and foreword of the tale Ehrengard by Isak Dinesen	
El violinista ambulante	1984	Turner	Translation of a tale by Thomas Hardy, included in an anthology titled Cuentos británicos	
El crepúsculo celta	1984	Alfaguara	Translation of poems by W. B. Yeats	
Religio Medici. Hydriotaphia	1986	Alfaguara	Translation of Religio Medici by Thomas Browne	
"El corazón de una historia quebrada", "La larga puesta de largo de Lois Tagget" and "Las dos partes implicadas"	1987	Poesía and Sur Express	Translation of "The Heart of a Broken Story", "The Long Debut of Lois Taggett" and "Both Parties Concerned" by J. D. Salinger	
Autorretrato en espejo convexo	1987	Visor	Translation of the collection of poems Self-Portrait in a Convex Mirror by John Ashbery	
Un encuentro en Valladolid	1987	El País Semanal	Translation of a short story by Anthony Burgess	
Cuentos únicos	1987	Siruela	Translation of The Pipe-Smoker by Martin Armstrong, "Man Overboard!" by Winston Churchill, "The Cherries" by Lawrence Durrell, "The Making of a Man" by Richard Middleton and "The Ring of Fire" by Ronald Ross, all included in an anthology titled Cuentos únicos	
Cómo matar	1992	Libros del Pexe	Translation of the poem How to Kill by Keith Douglas, included in an anthology titled Poesía inglesa del siglo XX	
Notas para una ficción suprema	1992	Pre-Textos	Translation of Notes Toward a Supreme Fiction by Wallace Stevens	
Un poema no escrito	1996	Pre-Textos	Translation of the poem Dichtung und Wahrheit by Wystan Hugh Auden	
"Museos y mujeres"	‍–‍	Revista de Occidente	Translation of the tale "Museums And Women" by John Updike	
Amahl y los visitantes nocturnos	‍–‍	‍–‍	Translation of the opera Amahl and the Night Visitors by Gian Carlo Menotti, for its performance	

== Miscellaneous ==
Miscellaneous works by Javier Marías
Title	Year of first publication	First edition publisher	Notes	Ref.
Vidas escritas	1992	Siruela	Published in English with the title Written Lives	
Miramientos	1997	Alfaguara	Sketches of Spanish-language writers	
Desde que te vi morir	1999	Alfaguara	On Vladimir Nabokov, marking a century since his birth	
Salvajes y sentimentales. Letras de fútbol	2000	Aguilar	With a foreword by Paul Ingendaay	
Ven a buscarme	2011	Alfaguara	Children's literature	
