= Thus Bad Begins =

2014 novel by Javier Marías

- Cover of the first edition
- Author: Javier Marías
- Original title: Así empieza lo malo
- Translator: Margaret Jull Costa
- Language: Spanish
- Genre: Novel
- Publisher: Alfaguara
- Publication date: 2014
- Publication place: Spain
- English publication date: 2016

Thus Bad Begins (Spanish: Así empieza lo malo) is a 2014 novel by Javier Marías.

== Synopsis ==
Set in the Spanish transition to democracy, Juan de Vere is hired as personal assistant to Eduardo Muriel, a successful film director in the past. De Vere witnesses Muriel's married life with his wife, Beatriz Noguera. Muriel then commissions De Vere an investigation into doctor Jorge Van Vechten's dubious life during the Francisco Franco dictatorship.

== Publication ==
It was Marías's fourteenth novel, following The Infatuations. The book was originally published in Spanish, under the title Así empieza lo malo, by Alfaguara on 23 September 2014. The translation into English, entitled Thus Bad Begins, was done by Margaret Jull Costa and published by Penguin and Knopf in 2016. The title comes from Hamlet, by William Shakespeare.

The book is dedicated to film director and friend Tano Díaz Yanes and to Carme López Mercader.

== Reception ==
The novel was selected as the best book of the year 2014 by magazine Babelia, newspaper El País's cultural supplement.

Robert McCrum, in a review for The Guardian, deemed the novel to read "like a self-conscious parody of earlier work." He described it as containing "countless elegant, and serpentine, sentences, sinuous meditative passages mixed with provocative paradoxes, but not enough substance." McCrum also wrote that Marías's reflections on his past may mean "a lot to his Spanish readers" but not so much to others.

Donald Breckenridge, of the Los Angeles Review of Books, wrote that the novel was "an absolute pleasure to read", but he added that Marías is, "on occasion, a bit too eager to decelerate the novel's momentum in order to pay another homage to Shakespeare."

Karan Mahajan, writing for The New York Times, commented that Marías had a problem: "that of lapsing into universal-sounding banalities, almost as a tic."

In a review for The Times, Theo Tait wrote that there was "self-cannibalising" in the book, because Marías had already used part of the plot in When I Was Mortal. He added that it was a "satisfying, consistently entertaining novel", with a smooth translation by Jull Costa.

== See also ==
- Javier Marías bibliography
