= Your Face Tomorrow Volume 2: Dance and Dream =

2004 novel by Javier Marías

- First edition (Spanish)
- Author: Javier Marías
- Original title: Tu rostro mañana #2: Baile y sueño
- Translator: Margaret Jull Costa
- Cover artist: art by permission from Alfaguara, design by Semadar Megged
- Language: Spanish
- Genre: Novel
- Publisher: Alfaguara
- Publication date: 2004
- Publication place: Spain
- English publication date: 2006
- Media type: Print (Paperback)
- ISBN: 978-0-8112-1749-1
- OCLC: 228505134
- Preceded by: Your Face Tomorrow Volume 1: Fever and Spear
- Followed by: Your Face Tomorrow Volume 3: Poison, Shadow and Farewell

Your Face Tomorrow Volume 2: Dance and Dream is a 2004 novel by the Spanish writer Javier Marías. The original Spanish title of the novel is Tu rostro mañana #2: Baile y sueño. Margaret Jull Costa's English translation was published by New Directions in 2006. It became a London Times Literary Supplement Best Book of 2007.
