= List of language interpreters in fiction =

This is a list of language interpreters in fiction. Conference interpretation is often depicted in works of fiction, be it in films or in novels. Sydney Pollack's The Interpreter and Javier Marías' A Heart So White (1992) are amongst the best known examples. Several books, symposia or websites tackle the issue at hand. Below is a list of works of fiction in which interpreters appear.

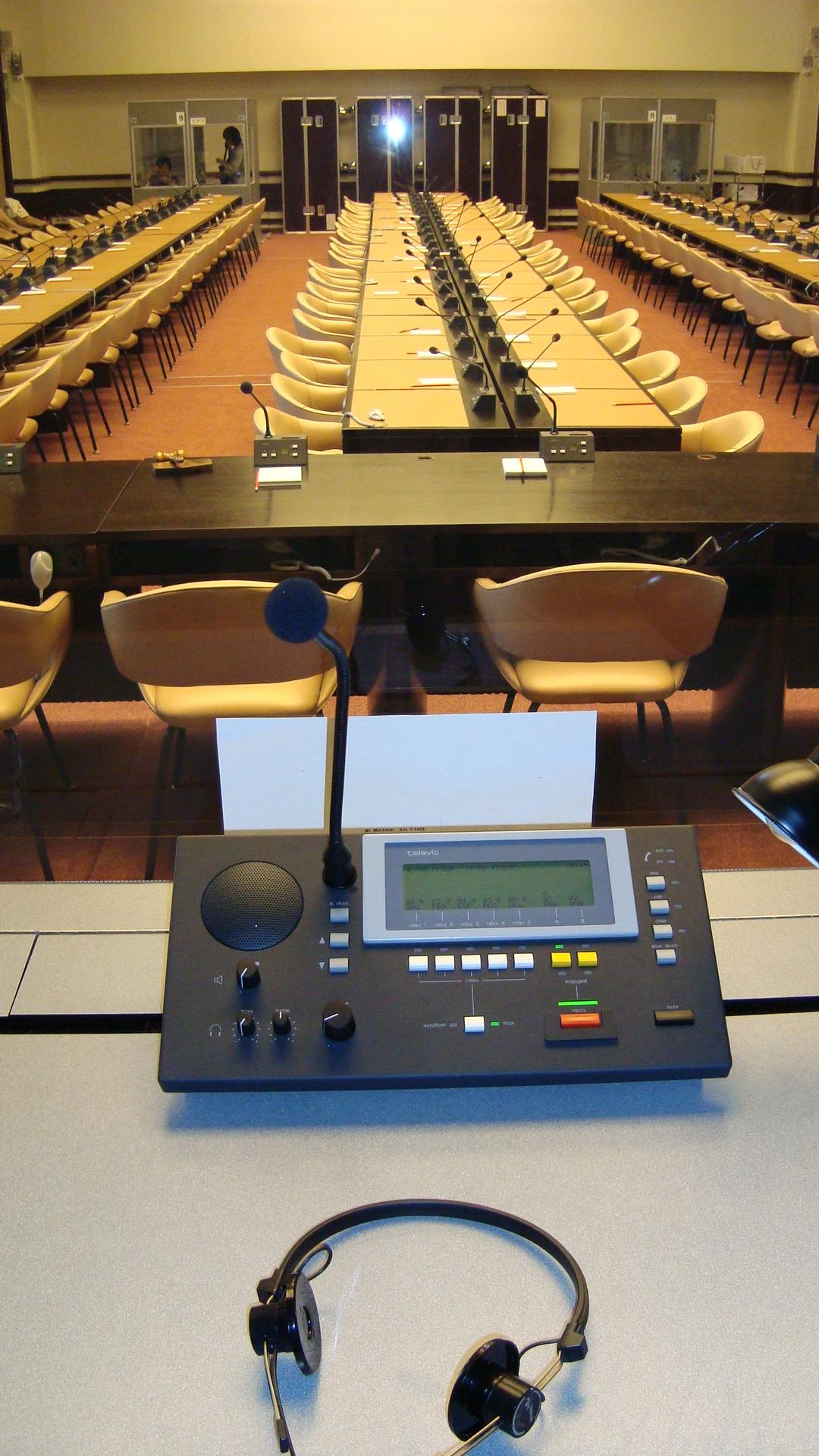
The interpreter's point of view

== Interpreters in films ==
=== 1956 to 1989 ===
- 1956: The King and I - Directed by Walter Lang. The interpreter refuses to translate what Anna Leonowens tells the kralahome (the king's minister); it then appears that the kralahome understands English. This scene shows that an interpreter has to fear being associated with the speaker.
- 1961: Judgment at Nuremberg – Directed by Stanley Kramer. Simultaneous interpretation was used for the first time at the Nuremberg trials.
- 1963: Charade - Directed by Stanley Donen. Audrey Hepburn plays an interpreter.
- 1964: Fail-Safe – Directed by Sidney Lumet. "There would be phalanxes of interpreters listening in, to insure against even the tiniest mistranslation... Simultaneous translation is a good dramatic device, because it avoids the distraction of subtitles or the absurdity of a Russian leader speaking fluent English".
- 1965: Gendarme in New York (Le Gendarme à New York) – Directed by Jean Girault. French policemen travel to New York. The welcome speech is interpreted in several languages. Louis de Funès’ headphones don’t seem to work.
- 1968: Barbarella - Directed by Roger Vadim. Barbarella lands on a foreign planet and asks the locals, "Do you speak English? Parlez-vous français?" She then activates her "tongue-box" which helps her understand what people say. From then on, everybody speaks English.
- 1970: Patton - Directed by Franklin J. Schaffner.
- 1971: Bananas – Directed by Woody Allen.
- 1973: Live and Let Die – Directed by Guy Hamilton. An anonymous hand substitutes a jack plug for another on a telephone-switch type of contraption in the interpreter's booth. Following this a delegate receives a deadly shock to the head. Languages channels are not linked to particular delegations and are not located in the booths either.
- 1973: Le Magnifique – Directed by Philippe de Broca. A dying Albanian has something to reveal. Five different persons are brought in, each one of them understanding a Slavic language, the last one of them being a French speaker who understands Czech. An illustration of relay interpreting.
- 1977: Close Encounters of the Third Kind – Directed by Steven Spielberg. In the French version, the interpreter paraphrases what is said as he cannot interpret French into French.
- 1977 to 2008: Star Wars – Directed by George Lucas. The robot C-3PO speaks 6 million galactic languages fluently. "Don’t blame me! I’m an interpreter! I’m not supposed to know the difference between a power socket and a computer terminal. I'm not much more than an interpreter, and not very good at telling stories." EV-9D9: "How many languages do you speak?" C-3PO: "I am fluent in over six million forms of communication and can readily—" EV-9D9: "Splendid. We have been without an interpreter since our master got angry with our last protocol droid and disintegrated him."
- 1981: Teheran 43 - Directed by Alexander Alov and Vladimir Naumov. One of the main characters is accompanied by an interpreter called Marie Louni.
- 1986: Children of a Lesser God - Directed by Randa Haines. Includes a sign language interpreter.

=== From 1990-present ===
- 1995: Nixon– Directed by Oliver Stone. A Russian and a Chinese interpreter.
- 1996: Mars Attacks! – Directed by Tim Burton. A robot serves as an interpreter between humans and Martians.
- 1997: La vita è bella – Directed by Roberto Benigni. The character played by Benigni pretends to understand German and interprets the words of the SS so as not to worry his son.
- 1999: Anna and the King - Directed by Andy Tennant. The interpreter refuses to translate what Anna Leonowens tells the kralahome (the king's minister); it then appears that the kralahome understands English.
- 2003: Lost in Translation – Directed by Sofia Coppola. Very lengthy explanations in Japanese are translated in very few words by the interpreter. "That's all he said?" asks the character played by Bill Murray.
- 2004 The Terminal – Directed by Steven Spielberg. Victor Navorski (Tom Hanks), having learned English all by himself in the terminal serves as an interpreter between the US authorities and a Russian who has been caught by the customs officers.
- 2005: The Interpreter (2005) – Directed by Sydney Pollack. Sylvia Broome (Nicole Kidman) is an interpreter at the United Nations in New York. She understands ku, a fictional language, and hears a conversation between two delegates speaking that language.
- 2005: Everything Is Illuminated - Directed by Liev Schreiber, after the eponymous novel by Jonathan Safran Foer. A young American travels to Ukraine to find his ancestors. He is accompanied by an informal guide-interpreter.
- 2005 : The Hitchhiker's Guide to the Galaxy - Directed by Garth Jennings and based on the book by Douglas Adams. An animal by the name of Babel fish serves as a universal translator.
- 2005-2009 Kaamelott - Directed by Alexandre Astier. The Burgundian king brings an interpreter (Lorànt Deutsch) who tries to give Arthur helpful advice on defeating the Burgundians. Kaamelott, livre I, episode 24.
- 2006: La traductrice (2006) - Directed by Elena Hazanov.
- 2006: The Boss of it All (Direktøren for det hele) – Directed by Lars von Trier. An Icelandic-Danish interpreter intervenes in the beginning and in the end of the film.
- 2009: The Hurt Locker - Directed by Kathryn Bigelow. An Iraqi interpreter.
- 2009: Je l'aimais - Directed by Zabou Breitman and based on the novel by Anna Gavalda. The character played by Daniel Auteuil falls in love with an interpreter.
- 2009: Desert Flower - Directed by Sherry Horman. The character representing Waris Dirie (author of the eponymous book) needs an interpreter when in hospital. The interpreter lectures her and tells her how she should behave.
- 2010: Mad Men, The Chrysanthemum and the Sword, Season 4, Episode 5. The agency is about to make a deal with Honda motorcycles. The Japanese interpreter is embarrassed{ to translate the words of Roger Sterling.
- 2010: The Tourist - Directed by Florian Henckel von Donnersmarck. An interpreter is urgently called by the British secret services and is asked to interpret what Russian gangsters are saying. He asks to be given some context but will get none.
- 2011 L'arrivo di Wang - Directed by Antonio and Marco Manetti. Aliens study Chinese before landing on earth as they think it's the most widely spoken language on the planet. An interpreter by the name of Gaia is hired by the Italian authorities to try and communicate with them.
- 2012 Zero Dark Thirty - Directed by Kathryn Bigelow. Features several military interpreters.
- 2012 Emperor - Directed by Peter Webber. The Japanese interpreter, Takahashi (Masayoshi Haneda), helps General Fellers for every mission including negotiation and finding his lover.

== Interpreters in TV shows ==
- 1999-2006: The West Wing - Created by Aaron Sorkin. Kenny Thurman (Bill O'Brien), is the ASL interpreter for pollster Joey Lucas (Marlee Matlin).
- 2013–2019: Game of Thrones - Created by George R. R. Martin. Missandei (Nathalie Emmanuel) is former slave who works as Daenerys Targaryen's interpreter.
- 2016: The Interpreter - Created by Hong Jinghui and Ying Yang. Qiao Fei (Yang Mi) and Cheng Jiayang (Huang Xuan) are professional French interpreter.
- 2018: You Drive Me Crazy - Created by Park Mi-ryeong. Han Eun-sung (Lee Yoo-young) the simultaneous French interpreter working for a South Korean Interpreter Agency.
- 2021: Seqalu: Formosa 1867 - Created by Chen Yao-chang. Tiap-moe (Wen Chen-ling), is the interpreter for Charles Le Gendre
- 2023: Port of Lies - Created by Tang Fu-juei. Leena (Regina Lei), is the interpreter for Tung Pao-jhu
- 2024: Shōgun - Created by Rachel Kondo and Justin Marks. Toda Mariko (Anna Sawai) is the interpreter for Toranaga and John Blackthorne.
- 2024: When the Phone Rings - Created by Kim Ji-woon. Hong Hee-joo (Chae Soo-bin) and Jeong Won-bin (Jung Ji-hwan) are the sign language interpreter.
- 2024: Our Interpreter - Created by Fei Hui Jun. Lin Xi (Victoria Song) is known as the "witch" in the translation industry works at Huasheng as the youngest chief interpreter.
- 2026: Can This Love Be Translated? - Created by Hong Jung-eun and Hong Mi-rae. Joo Ho-jin (Kim Seon-ho) is the multi-lingual interpreter for reality dating show Romantic Trip.

== Interpreters in literature ==
=== from 1893 to 2000 ===
- 1893 : The Adventure of the Greek Interpreter, short story by Arthur Conan Doyle.
- 1963 : Asterix and the Goths (comic book): Rhetoric, a cowardly Gaulish-Gothic interpreter, is called in to try and convince Getafix to cooperate and brew a magic potion. Although Getafix flatly refuses, Rhetoric misinterprets and says that he has agreed to do so.
- 1966 : The Russian Interpreter by Michael Frayn. A love story between a Russian woman and a British businessman, with the help of an interpreter.
- 1968 : Between by Christine Brooke-Rose. Experimental novel written in several languages. The verb "to be" is never used. The main character is an interpreter.
- 1979 : The Hitchhiker's Guide to the Galaxy by Douglas Adams. An animal by the name of Babel fish serves as a universal translator.
- 1980 : Toutes les chances plus une by Christine Arnothy. The main character is an interpreter.
- 1981 : The Summer Before the Dark by Doris Lessing. A housewife becomes an interpreter overnight to do a favor to a friend of her husband's.
- 1982 : Simultan by Ingeborg Bachmann. Short stories.
- 1983 : A tolmács by Ágnes Gergely.
- 1991 : The Greek Interpreter by Max Davidson. A comic thriller with two interpreters as main characters. The story takes place in Bangkok on the occasion of the World League of Parliaments’ annual conference.
- 1992 : A Heart So White (Corazón tan blanco) by Javier Marías. The narrator is an interpreter who claims to come by on a few months' work a year. He also boasts about the way he changes what heads of state say to each other.

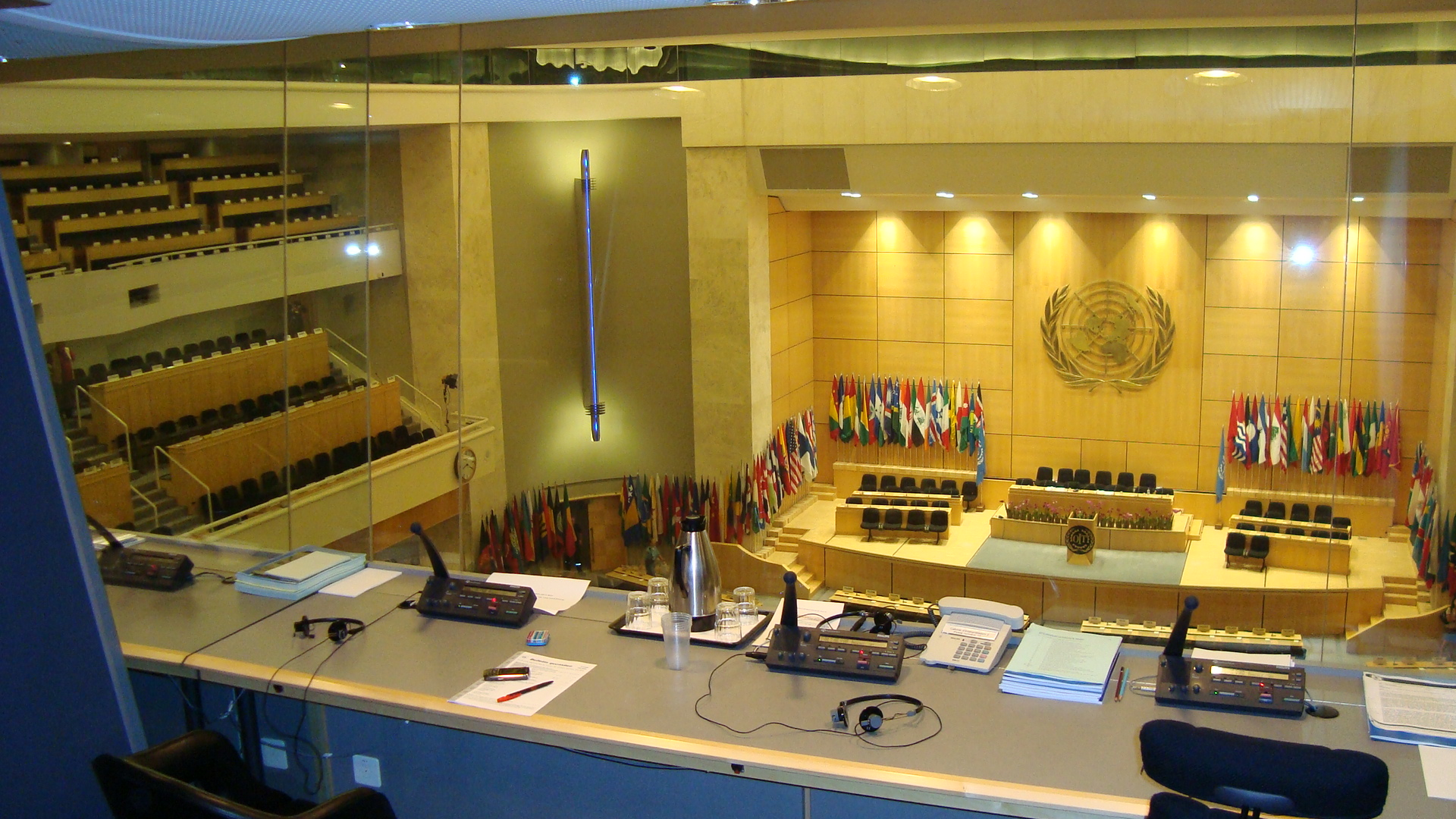

- 1997 : Der Versteckspieler by György Dalos. The main character is an interpreter and political opponent in Hungary in the 1970s.
- 1999 : The Devil Knew Not by Bill Newton Dunn, Member of the European Parliament. Political thriller set at the European Parliament, with all its actors, MEPs, journalists and interpreters.
- 2000 : Siberiana by Jesús Díaz. The main character, a young black Cuban, travels to Siberia to make a documentary on the building of the railroad. He is accompanied by an interpreter.
- 2000 : A Storm of Swords, the third novel in the series A Song of Ice and Fire by George R. R. Martin, features a young slave named Missandei, who initially acts as an interpreter for the slave masters of Astapor, before joining Daenerys Targaryen's entourage.

=== From 2001-present ===
- 2001 : Brazil Red (Rouge Brésil) by Jean-Christophe Rufin features several interpreters who work with the colonisers and the native population.
- 2003 : The Interpreter by Suzanne Glass. This novel served as a basis for the film The Interpreter by Sydney Pollack.
- 2003 : The Interpreter of Maladies by Jhumpa Lahiri. Collection of nine short stories. The main character in the title story works as an interpreter for a doctor and acts as a tour-guide around India when not working, inter alia for an American family of Indian descent.
- 2003 : The Interpreter by Suki Kim.
- 2004 : Tongue-tied (Die verlorene Sprache) by Liselotte Marshall. Autobiographical novel about an interpreter, Rachel Bernstein, a Jewish immigrant, a Holocaust survivor, who has no home country nor native tongue.
- 2005 : Bel Canto by Ann Patchett. Various characters are held hostage, amongst them an interpreter.
- 2006 : The Mission Song by John le Carré. The main character is an interpreter named Bruno Salvador who knows several African languages.
- 2006 : The Bad Girl (Travesuras de la niña mala) by Mario Vargas Llosa. The narrator is an interpreter.
- 2008: The Interpreter: Journal of a German Resister in Occupied France by Marcelle Kellermann. Novel in the form of a diary written by an interpreter working for the Wehrmacht. The author took part in the French Résistance.
- 2009: The Hundred-Year-Old Man Who Climbed Out the Window and Disappeared by Jonas Jonasson. In chapter 16, the main character has dinner with Stalin, Beriya, a nuclear physicist "and a little, almost invisible young man without a name and without anything to either eat or drink. He was the interpreter, and they pretended he wasn't there." A poem is then proclaimed in Swedish: '"The Russian-English (insignificant) interpreter sat in silence on his chair and was even less significant than before." Later, "the dinner was over, because the interpreter fainted." In chapter 23, the main character serves as an interpreter between Lyndon B. Johnson and Charles de Gaulle in May 1968.
- 2010 : Hauch der Hydra by Helga Murauer. Thriller. An interpreter inadvertently hears a conversation between two mafiosi during a break.
- 2010: The Thousand Autumns of Jacob de Zoet by David Mitchell. The main character relies on an interpreter to conquer the heart of his beloved. The story takes place in Japan in the 18th century.
- 2012: Entre deux voix : Journal d'une jeune interprète de conférence by Jenny Sigot Müller. The main character, Sonia Clancy, is a young fledgling interpreter who feels that her booth is slowly turning into a glass cage.

== See also ==
- Universal translator

== Sources ==
- Wortklauber, Sinnverdreher, Brückenbauer, DolmetscherInnen und ÜbersetzerInnen als literarische Geschöpfe (Pedants, traducers or bridge builders. Interpreters and translators as literary creations). Ingrid Kurz, Klaus Kaindl (editeurs), Im Spiegel der Literatur Band 1, LIT Verlag Vienna 2005 - ISBN 3-8258-8495-3
- Translation Goes To the Movies by Michael Cronin, London, Routledge, 2008, ISBN 0415422868
- Daniel Pageon on Voiceoverworld
- Article by Phil Smith on aiic’s website
- (De-)Constructing translingual identity. Interpreters as literary characters in Simultan by Ingeborg Bachmann and Between by Christine Brooke-Rose by Eva Schopohl.

This article incorporates information from the French-language Wikipedia
