= Los dominios del lobo =

1971 novel by Javier Marías

- Cover of an Alfaguara edition
- Author: Javier Marías
- Language: Spanish
- Genre: Novel
- Publisher: Edhasa
- Publication date: 1971
- Publication place: Spain

Los dominios del lobo (lit. 'The Domains of the Wolf') is a 1971 novel, the first by Javier Marías.

== Premise ==
Set in the United States, where the Taeger family begins to fall apart after the death of aunt Mansfield.

== Publication ==
In 1969, having recently finished his first year at university, Marías, who was 17 at the time, spent a month and a half in Paris, where he wrote the novel. He stayed at a house one of his uncles, filmmaker Jess Franco, owned there. The book is dedicated to Juan Benet and Vicente Molina Foix. In the prologue to a 1992 edition of the novel, Marías explains that the former interceded to get it published and that the latter came up with the title.

The book was first published by Edhasa in 1971, in an edition that was 209 pages long; subsequently by Anagrama in 1996, and by Alfaguara in 1999.

== Reception ==
James H. Abbott, writing for Books Abroad, highlighted Marías's "experience with techniques of the cinema, his fertile imagination and his narrative skill", as well as his sense of humour. He regarded Marías as "a master narrator and extremely skillful in moving his stories at a fast pace."

Rafael Conte, in a review for Informaciones, said that it was the first time in years that he could not let go of a book until he had finished reading it three or four hours after starting it.

In a revision of Marías's work published by newspaper ABC after his death, Los dominios del lobo was singled out as a "funny parody" whose style had nothing to do with his later novels.

== See also ==
- Javier Marías bibliography
