= Joo Ho-jin =

Can This Love Be Translated? protagonist

- Can This Love Be Translated? character
- Joo Ho-jin on his job as simultaneous interpreter for dating show Romantic Trip (portrayed by Kim Seon-ho)
- First appearance: Episode 1; January 16, 2026
- Last appearance: Episode 12; January 16, 2026
- Created by: Hong Jeong-eun and Hong Mi-ran
- Portrayed by: Kim Seon-ho

In-universe information
- Full name: Joo Ho-jin

Korean name
- Hangul: 주호진
- RR: Ju Hojin
- MR: Chu Hojin
- Nickname: Papago (Note: Papago is an artificial intelligence language translation program owned by Naver.)
- Occupation: Multilingual interpreter Korean, Chinese, Japanese, English, Italian, French
- Family: Yoon Won-jae (maternal grandfather, deceased); Joo Seong-han (father); Yoon Mi-jung (mother); Dario (step-father); Na Jin-seok (half-brother); Na Yeon-jeong (Na Jin-seok's mother)
- Significant other: Cha Mu-hee
- Origin: Seoul
- Nationality: South Korean

Joo Ho-jin (Korean: 주호진; pronounced [tɕu.ho.dʑin]; born 1991) is a fictional character and the main protagonist of the Netflix romantic comedy series Can This Love Be Translated?, created and written by screenwriters Hong Jung-eun and Hong Mi-ran (the Hong sisters). Portrayed by Kim Seon-ho, marking his return as a romantic comedy lead, the character made his debut when all 12 episodes of the series premiered globally on January 16, 2026.

Directed by Yoo Young-eun, the series features Ho-jin as a polyglot working as a freelance simultaneous interpreter. The plot follows his evolving relationship with global top star Cha Mu-hee while working as an interpreter during the international production of the dating reality show Romantic Trip in Canada and Italy.

Media outlets described the high social-media engagement surrounding the character as "Joo Ho-jin fever." The series subsequently spent two consecutive weeks at number one on its global non-English chart and ranked as the second most-watched South Korean Netflix original series in the first half of 2026.

Kim's performance received critical praise, with reviewers highlighting his foreign-language dialogue execution, vocal tone, and on-screen chemistry with his co-star Go Youn-jung. The role earned him several Best Actor nominations. Beyond the screen, the character was linked with increased set-jetting tourism to the series filming locations across South Korea, Japan, Canada, and Italy. The dialogue spoken by Ho-jin was featured on the 2026 10th Grade Literature Exam in Hanoi, Vietnam.

== Storyline overview ==
Joo Ho-jin is a professional interpreter who maintains a neat and structured life. During one of his annual trips to Shonan, Japan, he meets aspiring actress Cha Mu-hee. After a few months, they reunite in South Korea after she becomes a global superstar, following the success of her film, The Quiet Woman.

Ho-jin joins the crew of the dating reality show Romantic Trip. Filming takes place in Canada and Italy. Tasked with interpreting for Mu-hee and Japanese actor Hiro Kurosawa (portrayed by Sota Fukushi), Ho-jin finds his professional boundaries compromised by his growing feelings for Mu-hee.

== Characterization ==
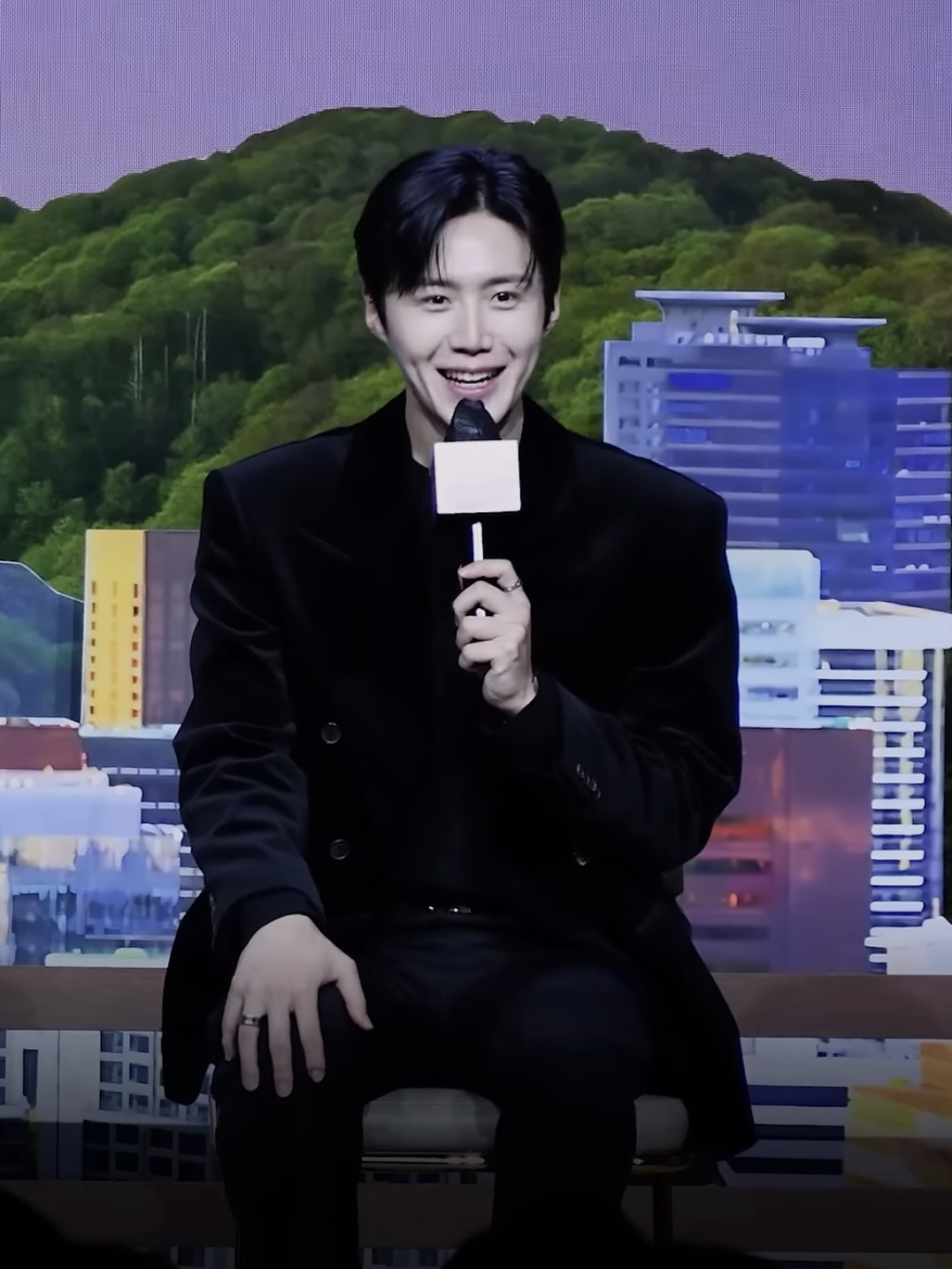
Kim Seon-ho during the series' press conference

Netflix promotional materials describe Joo Ho-jin as a "language genius," a polyglot proficient in multiple languages, including Japanese, English, and Italian on top of his native Korean. Working as a simultaneous interpreter, his career involves frequent international travel. Netflix Tudum further describes Ho-jin as reserved, introspective, and highly rational, stating that he "prioritizes exactitude above all else in his work and personal life" and "prefers to deal with the complexities of language rather than his own emotions."

Kim Seon-ho said Ho-jin has built up defense mechanisms so he can act as if nothing is wrong. He is simply not used to showing what he really feels. Even when he is affectionate, he holds back and thinks things through carefully before he speaks or acts. Director Yoo Young-eun saw him the same way: grounded, logical, and someone who processes the world in a "zero or one" way. He stays polite and kind, but keeps firm boundaries until he has fully worked through his feelings. His personality stands in clear contrast to his more emotional parents, half-brother, and love interest Cha Mu-hee. Within the Myers–Briggs Type Indicator framework, Kim identified Ho-jin as a "T" (thinking) type, whereas Go Youn-jung saw him more specifically as an ISTJ. This "strong thinking type" personality shows up in a neat, direct, and rather sharp way of speaking, often delivered with a formal, literary cadence. Director Yoo explained that the character's linguistic choices, such as the use of the term dangshin, (Note: In Korean, dangsin (당신) is a second-person pronoun that translates literally to "you," but it is rarely used in standard polite conversation.) reflect a traditional, elevated manner of speech.

Kim described Ho-jin as capable and intelligent. He can come across as indifferent at times, but there is real warmth underneath, and he stands firmly on his own as a mature adult. Yoo wanted him to feel like a refined, classic figure rather than someone chasing trends. That idea is reflected in both his clothes and the house he lives in. The house, which he inherited from his maternal grandfather, is full of books and antiques and acts as a metaphor for his lingering ties to the past. Yoo conceptualized the house as a blend of Western and traditional Hanok architectural styles, to emphasize that it was passed down rather than newly built.

== Relationships ==
=== Cha Mu-hee and Do Ra-mi ===
Cha Mu-hee (portrayed by Go Youn-jung), Ho-jin's love interest in the series, was introduced in the first episode as an aspiring actress. Ho-jin meets her by chance during his annual day trip to Shonan, Japan, which he takes on the birthday of his first love, Ji-sun. Ho-jin steps in using his language skills to help an Italian child suffering from an allergic reaction. Impressed, Mu-hee nicknames him Papago. She later asks him to help her confront her ex-boyfriend and his mistress. Grateful for his help, the Italian family gifts Ho-jin a dinner reservation they can no longer use, and he invites Mu-hee along. While exploring Shonan together, Ho-jin mentions that he met his first love on Enoshima Island. When he later learns that Ji-sun is in Japan that day, he leaves Mu-hee at the Enoden railway crossing.

After a shooting incident, Mu-hee falls into a coma. While she was unconscious, her horror film The Quiet Woman becomes a worldwide success. Waking up from her coma, she finds herself as a global superstar. During her international press tour, she meets Ho-jin, who works as her interpreter. However, he seeks her out to ask her to delete his photo from her Instagram. He worries that the post's time and location might expose his secret. Mu-hee later learns that Ho-jin visits her several times while she is in a coma, and she meets him to thank him. Kim said Ho-jin's heart has already been moved when he confides in Mu-hee about his secret unrequited love.

Their paths cross again at a hotel in Japan, where Ho-jin discovers that Mu-hee struggles with hallucinations of Do Ra-mi, the character from her horror film. He helps her secure a hospital appointment with a Japanese psychiatrist and serves as her interpreter. Kim cited this moment when Ho-jin learns Mu-hee's secret as a turning point in their relationship. Ho-jin feels a sense of kinship and empathizes with her. He was practically a goner, but he doesn't understand his own feelings.

Aurora over Banff

Ho-jin initially accepts the interpreter job on Romantic Trip to avoid his first love's wedding, but ultimately agrees to go because Mu-hee asks him to accompany her to see the aurora. In Canada, the two grow closer when they go to the market together. The appearance of Ji-sun in Canada creates a rift, but they reconcile while watching the aurora together. Following their first kiss, he drives Mu-hee to the airport and promises to think seriously about their relationship. However, Mu-hee soon learns that Ji-sun has cancelled her wedding, leading her to retreat from their blossoming relationship. Feeling hurt, he parts with her in Calgary, and drops out from the show.

Back in Seoul, Ho-jin witnesses Do Ra-mi taking over Mu-hee's consciousness. To understand why Do Ra-mi controls Mu-hee, Ho-jin returns as the show's interpreter in Italy. He juggles working as an interpreter by day and acting as Do Ra-mi's secret handler by night. Do Ra-mi finally confides her secret past trauma to him before bidding farewell. She also tells him that Mu-hee's anxiety regarding him is the exact trigger for her personality splits. Ho-jin is forced to suppress his true feelings. Meanwhile, after production crew members spot Ho-jin and Do Ra-mi together, a rumor of Ho-jin's secret girlfriend ignites Mu-hee's jealousy. In the final shoot of Romantic Trip, Ho-jin interprets Hiro's love confession to Mu-hee. The following day, Park PD sends Mu-hee a video footage documenting a visibly heartbroken Ho-jin. Watching the footage allows Mu-hee to fully unlock her memories of Do Ra-mi. The couple reconciles and shares their final night in Italy together.

In Seoul, Mu-hee's uncle informs Ho-jin about her childhood incident. Ho-jin then tells Mu-hee what he has learned: her family has deceived her, and her parents are actually still alive. She decides to search for her mother abroad, prompting a temporary breakup with Ho-jin. Near Christmas, she returns, and they reunite at a star observatory. Kim summarized their relationship with metaphors: Ho-jin as a "tree that doesn't sway" and Mu-hee as "grass swaying in the wind," noting that as they get to know each other, "their colors mix and dye each other." Another source likened their relationship to "clothes getting wet in a drizzling rain."

=== Shin Ji-sun ===
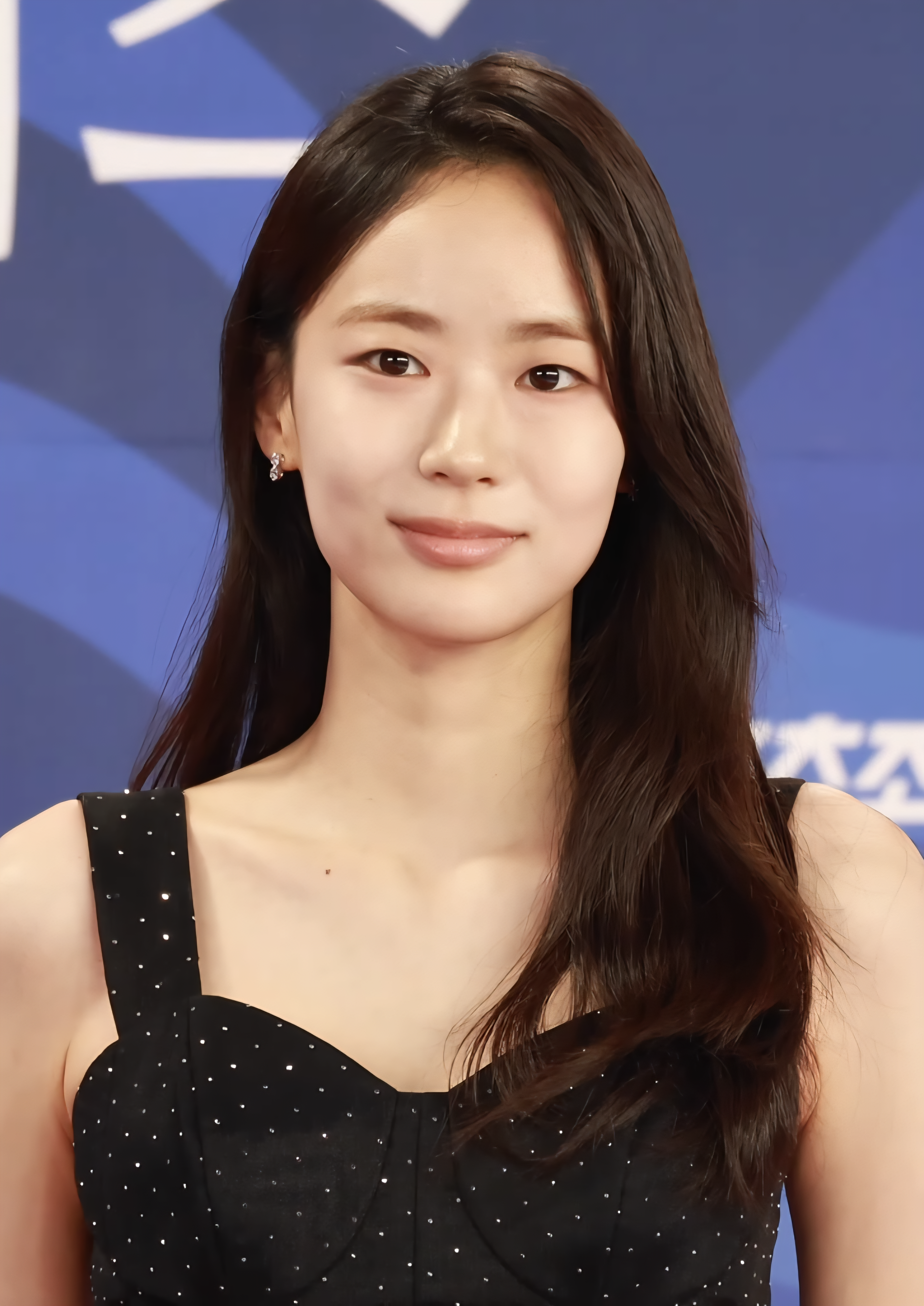
Lee E-dam portrayed Shin Ji-sun, Ho-jin's first love, in the series

Shin Ji-sun (portrayed by Lee E-dam) is introduced through a flashback sequence depicting a chance meeting with Ho-jin in Japan. Another flashback scene reveals her re-entry into his life as the girlfriend of his older half-brother, Na Jin-seok (portrayed by Sung Joon). Kim interprets Ho-jin's feelings for Ji-sun as "a regrettable first love." Director Yoo explained that from Ho-jin's perspective, there needs to be a strong reason why he cannot freely approach her. It was a case of "mismatched timing." Ho-jin keeps his feelings for Ji-sun hidden with one exception: every year on Ji-sun's birthday, he makes an annual trip to Enoshima Island to reflect on his unrequited love.

When Ho-jin is offered a job to work as interpreter on the dating reality show Romantic Trip, he accepts the job to avoid attending Jin-seok and Ji-sun's wedding. However, Ji-sun unexpectedly appears in Canada as the show's replacement director, forcing Ho-jin to carefully weigh his past feelings for her against his growing affection for Mu-hee. He soon discovers that her marriage has been cancelled.

After Ho-jin begins dating Mu-hee, he runs into Ji-sun on a train to Busan. Ji-sun already found out that Ho-jin visited Shonan on her birthday. During the trip, he finally has an opportunity to confess his past feelings for her. The two part ways amicably, having both already moved on with their respective new relationships. Reflecting on their arc, the Hong Sisters noted that the relationship between Ho-jin and Ji-sun is quite nuanced: "It is a relationship where they assumed the other person was a certain way based on past memories and simply let things be. While they thought they knew each other well, those lingering memories meant they actually understood each other's true feelings the least."

=== Family ===
Joo Ho-jin's family tree

Yoon Won-jae	Mrs. Yoon
Na Yeon-jeong	Joo Seong-han	Yoon Mi-jung	Dario
Na Jin-seok	Joo Ho-jin

Ho-jin comes from a wealthy family, a privileged upbringing that helped him become fluent in multiple languages. Language skills run in his family. Ho-jin's mother, Yoon Mi-jung, speaks Italian and Japanese. She is an only daughter of a wealthy figure who owned a publishing house and filled his house with books and antiques, turning it into a private museum.

Unlike many Korean dramas that center on traditional family ties, Ho-jin’s family members are portrayed as independent individuals who freely pursue their own lives. Yoon Mi-jung was an undergraduate student when she married her professor, who was a divorcee with a son from a previous relationship. Despite this, Ho-jin is close with his half-brother Na Jin-seok. Following his parents' divorce, Ho-jin lives alone in the house he inherited from his maternal grandfather. Meanwhile, his mother relocated to Italy to run a winery, and his father moved to Florida after retiring to pursue a dream of space travel. Kim noted that Ho-jin carries an emotional void stemming from his family situation, particularly after his relationship with his mother fractured when she burned a book he had written. He later abandons his promising career as a novelist and becomes an interpreter.

Director Yoo explained that without a chance encounter, the rift between Ho-jin and his mother likely would have remained unaddressed, because deep-seated family misunderstandings are often harder to resolve than conflicts between strangers. That opportunity comes when Romantic Trip suddenly moves its filming location to his mother's winery, bringing Ho-jin together with his estranged mother for the first time in 13 years. Mu-hee plays a part in the reconciliation process, just in time before her remarriage. Yoo added that the incident involving Dario, his mother's younger Italian fiancé, helps break down the wall between mother and son. In winter, Ho-jin's mother returns to Seoul to look after her father's collection, saying she will need several visits to finish decluttering and donating them.

== Character development, casting and portrayal ==
=== Concept and creation ===
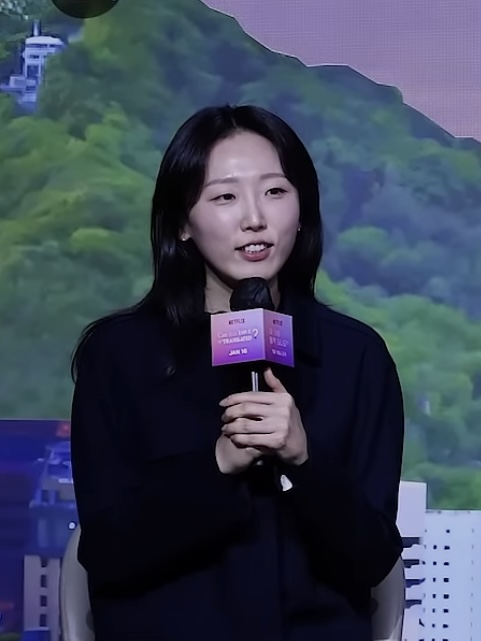
Director Yoo Young-eun during the series' press conference

In 2019, the Hong sisters started developing a tvN television series about an interpreter, with Park Jun-hwa as the director. They originally planned to film in China, however the COVID-19 pandemic forced them to cancel those plans. Production restarted in 2023 under Trii Studio, a subsidiary of Imaginus, which is the parent company of the Hong sisters' label, Studio Sot. Yoo Young-eun took over as director. In June 2024, the series was officially confirmed as a Netflix original series. The Hong sisters had previously had their work Alchemy of Souls distributed exclusively by Netflix, but this was their first Netflix original series. For Yoo, this was the first time she worked with Netflix.

The Hong sisters worked closely with Yoo during the development phase. Their original idea was a romantic comedy about two different personalities who try to bridge their differences through language. That concept shaped the title, scenarios, and characters' jobs. As they developed the script, it evolved from overcoming language barriers to a deeper exploration of how people truly understand each other.

Ho-jin's job as a simultaneous interpreter anchors the story. The Hong sisters said that the idea started from the special nature of the interpreter profession. They noted that when people cannot communicate, even a phone translation app becomes something they lean on heavily. With a human interpreter, the reliance becomes absolute. The dense, one-sided dependence of having to trust and follow one person felt especially appealing, and they imagined that this kind of relationship could naturally create an interesting romantic tension. Yoo added that the first part of the story focused on how Ho-jin clashes with a love interest who has an opposite personality and communication style. The latter half captures the process of growth and the completion of love as Ho-jin thinks in Mu-hee's language rather than his own.

=== Casting ===
The casting process for Joo Ho-jin's role began in April 2023 when Son Suk-ku was offered the lead role, but he declined in favor of Nine Puzzles. In July 2023, it was reported that Kim Seon-ho was in talks to play the part. Netflix confirmed the casting of Kim and his main co-stars in June 2024. The production marked Kim's first leading role in a Netflix original series, as well as his return to the romantic comedy genre following Hometown Cha-Cha-Cha (2021).

Everyone has their own language. To understand a person; actions, eye contact, tone of voice, and even physical touch are all languages too.

— Kim Seon-ho, Netflix

Kim didn't accept the project due to its genre. He was drawn to the role of a multilingual interpreter, finding the role an interesting challenge. After receiving early parts of the script, Kim decided to accept the offer, saying that this line, "Every person has their own language," resonated with him. He also liked the script's international travel aspect. Given that he was originally set to lead Pretty Crazy, a film that also centers on a dual-identity female lead, reporter Kang Hyo-jin asked if this similar theme influenced his decision. However, Kim clarified that it was not. He had already guessed the dual-identity setup, but he only grasped the full picture after receiving the complete script prior to the table read. He explained that the narrative unfolded differently. In this project, he found Ho-jin's secret relationship with Do Ra-mi entertaining.

On Kim's casting, the creative team explained the deciding factor in their final choice. Because the drama focuses on a slow-burn romance, they needed an actor who could clearly project subtle emotional changes. Yoo explained that Kim's acting strengths matched the complex traits of the character. Kim possessed exceptional talent with subtle expressions, and he has the ability to handle the character's serious, restrained traits while delivering the writers' signature comedy style. In post-drama written interviews, the Hong sisters stated, "After casting actor Kim Seon-ho, we truly enjoyed writing the script while imagining his performance. From Ho-jin's characteristic neatness to the dynamic moments where he wavers due to love, and the cool-headedness with which he controls the unexpected twists thrown by Mu-hee, he portrayed everything perfectly. He performed even better than we had imagined, making us incredibly happy."

=== Portrayal ===
From Kim's perspective, no scene was particularly difficult apart from learning the new languages. In retrospect, he did not regard the process as overly hard, noting that he later found it enjoyable. Kim lacked actual fluency in foreign languages, so he underwent four months of intensive training. Luckily, he only needed to master three: Japanese, English, and Italian. Kim said the biggest pressure came from acting in Japanese, because many people already speak the language well, while Italian was the language he found most enjoyable to learn. He started by memorizing the script verbatim before establishing the emotional framework through Korean run-throughs. He collaborated closely with language coaches to refine pronunciation and vocalization, striving to achieve natural delivery through rigorous repetition. He deliberately maintained a consistent speaking speed and tone across each language while still meeting his coaches' standard. In his own time, he also studied grammar. During filming, he continued working simultaneously with his coaches. At the series press conference, he remarked that acting in a foreign language is more challenging than performing action sequences. He mentioned that the multilingual scenes demanded sustained focus, noting that due to intense pressure of acting in foreign languages, he stuttered in subsequent scenes in his native Korean.

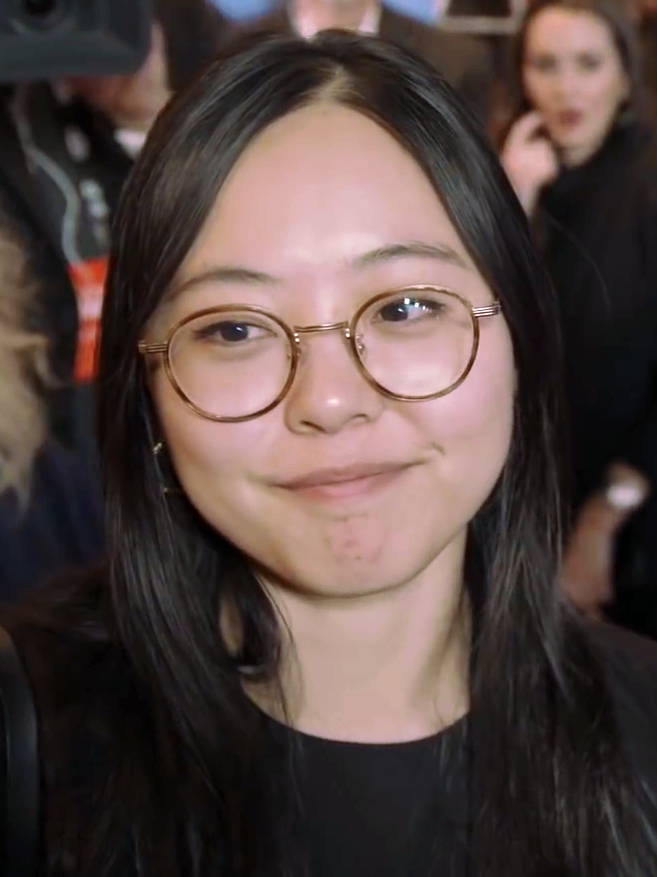
Sharon Choi, renowned as Director Bong Joon Ho's interpreter. She was one of the professionals Kim studied while researching the interpreter profession.

To prepare for his role, Kim researched real-world interpreters, including Sharon Choi, while also drawing on his past experience working with other interpreters. He also consulted his Italian coach, who works as an active Italian embassy interpreter, and his Japanese coach, who is both an actor and a professional interpreter. He learned that interpreters deliberately suppress their emotions to remain objective, conveying messages clearly without revealing personal opinions. They typically maintain a neutral yet slightly smiling expression, a polite demeanor, and always position themselves one step behind the speakers. He also noticed their habit of focusing on reading speakers' lips while rapidly jotting down notes in memos. He later integrated the habits and body language of professional interpreters into his performance.

Because the role was vocally demanding, Kim drank warm tea every morning to care for his voice throughout the production. He modified his speech to create a clear distinction between interpreting and ordinary conversation. Paying close attention to how his voice carried through the microphone and earphones, he focused on precise pronunciation and a subdued emotional tone. Since the character speaks a formal, literary language, he took extra care to ensure his articulation stayed crisp while keeping his delivery natural. As a result, he instinctively lowered his pitch and register below his normal speaking voice.

To bring Ho-jin to life, Kim had to navigate a personal challenge: Ho-jin's character is the opposite of his real-life personality. His own MBTI type leans toward "feeling," so he found Ho-jin's bluntness challenging to portray. To better understand the nuances of their respective characters, Kim and Go spent their free time swapping roles, memorizing and rehearsing together. By consulting Go, who identifies as a "thinking type," he gained a clearer understanding of Ho-jin's motivations, which helped him fully internalize his character. Kim noted that their rapport developed gradually, mirroring their characters' journey. Early filming in Japan felt awkward after only five days of preparation in Korea, but their bond deepened during subsequent shoots in Canada and Italy.

In the end, the characters I portray are emerging from within me. There are inevitably moments when they make choices that I myself would make... Like the way I look at the other person, the reactions that naturally follow, and even the laughter, were choices I made in prior agreement with the writers. People who know me well say that when they see Joo Ho-jin, they think, "That’s just like you." It is similar when you watch or, in very fleeting moments, you feel, "That's exactly something Kim Seon-ho would say or do." I tried hard to capture those subtle nuances well, so I'm grateful if you noticed.

— Kim Seon-ho, Harper Bazaar Korea

To stay true to Ho-jin's rigid character, Kim decided on "static acting," remaining composed with minimal physical reactions, while focusing on minute details, such as gaze direction, eyebrow movement, or a single hand gesture. To ensure the core foundation of the story remained solid, he maintained close communication with the creative team. During script readings, Kim and the Hong sisters agreed that the essence of the narrative lies in how the initially rigid Ho-jin gradually learns and changes. The Hong sisters also welcomed improvisation, allowing Kim and Go to contribute their own ideas and ad-libs, which Director Yoo noted enriched the scenes beyond the original script. Kim explained that he deliberately added small realistic details to give the character more liveliness so that Ho-jin would not feel too stiff, while leaving room to react naturally to Go's ad-libs. Because she often says unpredictable things, he focused on receiving them in a composed way, aiming to let her shine and guide her closer to the story's theme.

Director Yoo and Kim deeply contemplated the best way to portray two polar opposites slowly influencing each other. They analyzed the script together to plan how the rigid Ho-jin would begin to waver. After countless discussions, they decided to start showing them in Canada. The opening of Ho-jin's heart unfolded through gradual changes in attitude, which Kim interpreted as "actions following the realization of love," describing it as the character's most honest progression. He also said that the process is slow because Ho-jin went through a denial phase.

Since Do Ra-mi frequently took over as Mu-hee's alter ego, Kim had to calibrate his acting depending on which persona he shared scenes with. Viewing his role as a "pillar," he provided support to let his co-star move freely. He realized that if Ho-jin lost his center, he risked being swept up in Mu-hee's fluctuating emotions and losing his way, so he maintained his composed acting. Rather than viewing Do Ra-mi as a separate persona, Kim and the creative team agreed that she should be seen as Mu-hee's manifestation of emotional scars. Viewing Do Ra-mi as a pure, honest, and childlike character, he approached their interactions with added flexibility. He portrayed Ho-jin as warmer, albeit clumsy and unsure, to convey his earnest desire to help. He added that Ho-jin shows Do Ra-mi a side of himself that he cannot show Mu-hee and he thought of it as showing his awkwardness in expressing love.

== Themes and analysis ==
Screenshot of the user interface for Naver Papago, an AI-driven online translation service. Comparable to Google Translate, Papago is popular in South Korea. The name is used as the nickname for the character Joo Ho-jin in the drama, as both serve the same role of multilingual translation.

The character's profession as multilingual interpreter has prompted discussion about the role of human interpreters in the age of artificial intelligence. Writing for Catholic News, Kim Ji-hwan stated that the presence of a human interpreter carries significance, no matter how much science advances. Referring to Ho-jin as the "Human Papago," Hwang Jeong-ho from Tech 42 argued that AI-driven translation is transforming the interpreter's role into a specialized skill, particularly in high-stakes fields such as law and medicine. He emphasized that human interpreters like Ho-jin remain essential, because AI cannot yet replace their role in ensuring accountability, interpreting non-verbal intent, and navigating complex social dynamics. Their role is no longer merely a linguistic bridge; it shifts toward facilitating the critical human connection necessary for successful communication.

Writing for Cultura, Chung-Ang University professor Kim Min-jeong noted that the series treats every person as having their own unique language. Thus, despite being a gifted polyglot and professional interpreter, as a novice in love, Ho-jin has to learn Mu-hee's love language the same way he would a foreign one. Sejong University visiting professor Son Chi-yeok noted that Ho-jin follows the Hong sisters' character archetype, wherein seemingly perfect characters are often suspended between "past and present" or "reality and fiction," and they achieve personal growth only by colliding with their opposites. However, his profession as an interpreter made Ho-jin unique. Viewing language purely as a tool for work rather than a means of expressing feeling, he distrusts relationships built on words. He withholds emotion from both his family and Ji-sun, clinging to a rigid, logical mindset that cannot accommodate instability. This defense mechanism only begins to crumble after he encounters Mu-hee.

According to Art Insight editor Kang So-jeong, Ho-jin uses his profession as an emotional shield. His commitment to precise, emotionless translation serves him well professionally, but his habit of speaking in a clinical, direct manner affects his personal life, where his bluntness hurts others. Lee Yu-chae of Cine21 similarly pointed out that this communication style clashes with Mu-hee's tendency to beat around the bush, leading to frequent misunderstandings. Over time, as they keep trying to have a face-to-face conversation, Ho-jin starts to understand her anxiety and fear of abandonment, while she begins to see why he is so wary of deep relationships. Kim Hyun-jung of Science Times made a similar observation, citing a 2024 article by Marta Kowal et al. from the journal Human Nature that defined love as a "commitment device." According to Kim, Ho-jin's role as an interpreter mirrors the idea, as he constantly interprets Mu-hee's intentions to build a lasting bond.

누가 다정하면 죽을 것 같았다

Nuga dajeonghamyeon jugeul geot gatatda

I felt like I would die if someone were kind to me

— Kim Kyung-mi, a line from the poem Dajeongi Nareul (Note: Kim Kyung-mi's poem Dajeongi Nareul (다정이 나를; 'Kindness Kills Me') was first published in her poetry collection Gotongeul dallaeneun sunseo (고통을 달래는 순서; 'The Order of Soothing Pain') in 2009.)

Writing for The Hankyoreh, popular culture critic Hwang Jin-mi evaluated Ho-jin's character as dajeonghan namseongseongui yutopia (다정한 남성성의 유토피아; 'utopia of gentle masculinity'). His persona as a sunjeong dajeong mungwanam (순정 다정 문과남; 'a devoted, kind, liberal arts man') serves as an antithesis to igwanam. (Note: Igwanam (이과남; 'tech bro') a neologism combining igwa (이과; 'science/technology brand') and nam (남; 'man'), an opposite slang of mungwanam (문과남; 'liberal arts man'), a neologism combining mungwa (문과; 'liberal arts') and nam (남; 'man')) This latter archetype is frequently associated with the rise of gender divide in South Korea, further intensified by derogatory online tropes such as pongpongnam (Note: Pongpongnam (퐁퐁남) is a neologism combining pongpong (퐁퐁; 'a dishwashing soap brand') and nam (남; 'man'). Proponents, primarily misogynists, use this derogatory term to describe husbands they view as emasculated income providers. It stems from Seolgeojiron (설거지론; 'Dishwashing Theory'), a narrative claiming that women with promiscuous pasts marry elite, inexperienced men who then surrender their paychecks and perform household chores like dishwashing.) and eogulchung. (Note: Eogulchung (억울충) is a neologism combining eogul (억울; 'feeling victimized/wronged') and chung (충; 'insect'). It is a slang term commonly used online to criticize someone displaying negative or obsessive behavior.) Hwang argued that Ho-jin's sensitivity and capacity to embrace personal flaws offer an alternative to the toxicity prevalent in certain male-dominated online subcultures and serve as a model for successful romance. The term dajeong (다정; 'affectionate, gentle, or kind') is also the theme of Kim Kyung-mi's poem Dajeongi Nareul (다정이 나를; 'Kindness Kills Me'). In her essay on the poem's inclusion in the series, Professor Choi Yu-kyung argued that the poem explains that Ho-jin's kindness terrified Mu-hee, because it forced her to confront a long-buried trauma."

Writing for The Media & Arts Culture, Gong Na-ri likened Ho-jin to a practical psychoanalyst. Gong interprets Ho-jin's approach through a Freudian lens, comparing Ho-jin's explanations of Do Ra-mi's actions to the psychoanalytic interpretation of dreams. By observing Mu-hee's "untranslated language" through her alter ego, Do Ra-mi (manifested in her impulsive behavior and delusions), Ho-jin acts as a psychological mirror that helps integrate Mu-hee's fragmented self. Heo Gyu-hyeong, Chief Director of the Yonsei Sansup Mental Health Clinic, documented a discussion with fellow psychiatrists Kim Ji-yong and Oh Dong-hoon that reached a similar conclusion: while navigating Mu-hee's dual personality, Ho-jin functions as someone who connects her "scattered heart" by decoding the emotions behind Do Ra-mi's words. They argued that "true interpretation" in the drama lies in accepting all facets of a person rather than dismissing them.

Focusing on the character's visual presentation, Kim Ui-hyang of The Boutique described Ho-jin's style as "a smart dandy look" or "warm classic," centered on the principles of quiet luxury by prioritizing high-quality fabrics and precise silhouettes over overt branding. Columnist Cho Soo-jin offered a separate semiotic analysis of his clothing, arguing that it mirrors the character's conflict: his professional ability to decode complex global languages contrasted with his tendency to misread emotional cues. Cho observed that Ho-jin uses rigid, structured tailoring and neutral tones in professional settings to project logic and emotional distance. As his feelings for Mu-hee evolve, his wardrobe shifts from crisp, tightly buttoned formal wear to softer, textured knits as a visual metaphor for the gradual cracking of his defenses and his character development.

== Reception and impact ==
=== Critical reception ===
While critical response to the series was mixed, Kim's return to the romantic comedy genre received widespread praise. Writing for Ize, columnist Cho Seong-kyung stated that Kim "is once again earning fans' trust with his romantic acting." India Today critic Keshri described his return as a reclamation of his place in the genre after a long absence, noting that he excels at portraying Ho-jin as an emotionally present character rather than a dramatic or heroic one. She observed that much of his performance is conveyed through silences, pauses, and hesitant glances, making the character feel real. In a separate review for India Today, Agarwal highlighted his "natural warmth, suave restraint, and playfulness," noting that Kim gave the stoic character "emotional elasticity" without falling into caricature. Gong Na-ri of Munhwa Journal Mac credited his balanced approach with softening the character's potential stiffness, Palat of Gulf News praised Kim for portraying his character with more depth than typical male leads.

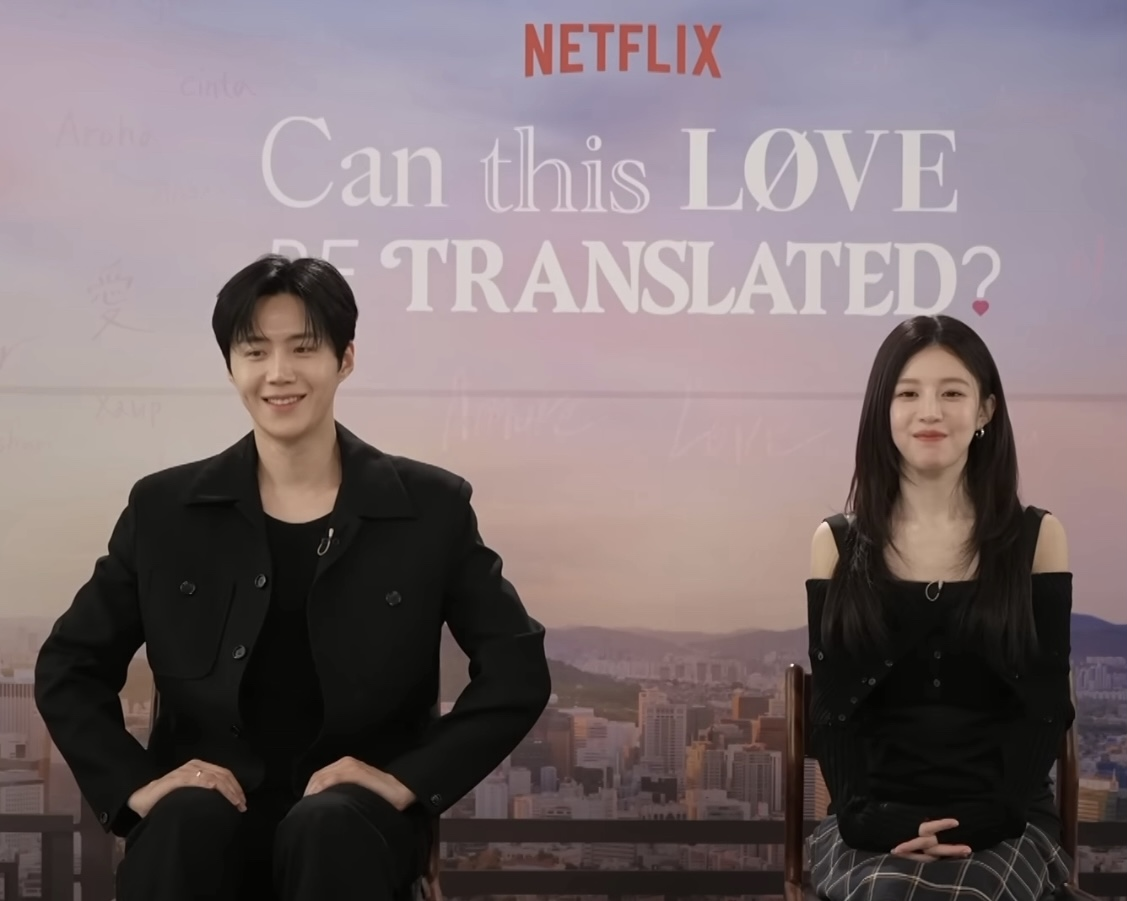
Kim Seon-ho and Go Youn-jung during an online interview for the series in January 2026

Reviewers shared similar praise for Kim and Go's chemistry: Keller of Decider called it "undeniable," Suwitcha of Bangkok Post called it "fantastic," Almeida of O Tempo referred to it as "magnetic," and Agarwal from Hello Magazine called it "easy breezy romantic chemistry." Nadkarni of Mashable India said that "it was so beautiful that you unknowingly fall in love with everything the show has to offer." Park Jin-young of Joy News24 commented that the on-screen chemistry between Kim and Go served as the show's main saving grace despite its narrative flaws.

Critics also praised Kim's performance as a multilingual interpreter. Baek Byung-yeul from The Korea Times called his performance "impressive." Reviewing for Numero Tokyo, Miki Fukabayashi named Ho-jin her favorite Korean drama character of 2026, pointing to his Japanese dialogue as "calm, composed, and reliable." Musnicky noted how smoothly Kim handled the distinct languages and stylistic demands of the role, while French critic Guigou emphasized his fluid transitions between languages alongside direction that grounded his emotional vulnerabilities. Writing for the literary magazine Keulmadang, Thomas cited Kim's ability to switch between different language families as "particularly remarkable." Jeong Seo-yeong of Woman Donga further remarked that Kim demonstrated impressive range by mastering the unique diction and gestures of each foreign language, alongside praising his deep immersion and restrained gaze.

Jung Yu-mi from Ize noted that the interpreter role suited Kim and showcased his true potential, praising his gentle baritone voice and characterizing the performance as "exquisite" due to "his natural delivery, nuanced acting, and precise emotional timing." Writing for Korea Medical, Lee Bo-hyun analyzed the technical aspects of Kim's vocal delivery and attributed his skill to classical theater training. Lee observed that Kim's voice blends masculine resonance with softness, highlighting his clear pronunciation and breath control, which allow him to convey subtle emotional shifts without monotony. Lee concluded that Kim's steady, low register delivers a sense of stability "akin to that of a professional voice actor."

Kim's performance received numerous accolades. He and Go were nominated in the Fan Choice Couple category at the 2026 Asia Star Entertainer Awards. He secured nominations for Best Lead Actor and the People's Choice Award for Male Actor at the 2026 Global OTT Awards, as well as Best Performance in an International Series at the SEC Awards. Further recognition followed with Best Actor and Popularity Award nominations at the 2026 Blue Dragon Series Awards, as well as nominations for Best Actor in International Competition and Outstanding Asian Star at the 2026 Seoul International Drama Awards.

To celebrate its 22nd anniversary, Joy News24 surveyed 142 industry professionals in October 2026. Kim and Go placed second in the poll for Best Drama Couple of 2026, receiving 24 votes. Kim earned four votes for K-Drama Actor of the Year and two votes in the Power People of the Year poll. The series received one vote for Best Drama of the Year.

=== Viewers reception and its impact ===
Clips featuring the character drew significant social media attention, and media outlets refer to it as "Joo Ho-jin fever." Kim Ui-hyang from Chosun Ilbo reported that the character influenced fashion trends, with consumer interest rising for Ho-jin's messenger bag and overall wardrobe. This contributes to the series' viewership. Netflix reported that the series reached the top 10 in 60 countries and topped the global non-English chart for two consecutive weeks following its premiere. The series remained in the top 10 for five weeks, accumulating over 271 million viewing hours and 20.6 million views during its first seven weeks. On July 17, 2026, according to Netflix engagement report for the first half of 2026, the series ranked 19th globally, with 28.6 million views and 377.7 million hours viewed.

By the end of January, Kim had gained more than one million new social media followers. Ho-jin's impact was further evidenced by big data analytics firm Good Data Corporation, which ranked Kim second in TV-OTT drama cast buzz-worthiness for three consecutive weeks in January 2026, while the series also ranked first in the integrated TV-OTT drama category during that same period. Kim was nominated for the Popularity Award in the K-drama actor category at the year-end FUNdex Award organized by the same firm. According to the Korean Advertising Association's Journal (Spring 2026 edition), Kim ranked second in Sometrend Analysis Center's January 2026 performer buzz-worthiness ranking with 7,273 mentions.

=== Cross-media influence ===
The viewers took a keen interest in the books associated with Ho-jin's character. Women Sense reported the rise of "poet core," highlighting how the show's inclusion of Kim Kyung-mi's poem triggered a surge of pre-order demand that placed her poetry collection, The Order of the Soothing Pain (2009), onto the bestseller list.

On June 1, 2026, lines from the series were featured in the 2026 10th Grade Literature Exam in Hanoi, Vietnam. (Note: The test serves as the admission exam for Hanoi's specialized literature classes at four high schools for the gifted in Hanoi: Nguyen Hue, Chu Van An, Hanoi-Amsterdam, and Son Tay.) The exam question quoted an exchange where Ho-jin states that there are over 7,100 languages in the world, to which his teacher responds, "There are as many languages as there are people in the world, because everyone speaks their own language." Based on this excerpt, candidates were required to write an essay exploring the topic of listening to the voices around them. Ho-jin's appearance in the exam quickly gained online attention, with young viewers expressing excitement that a popular drama had become part of a major test, while teachers praised the material as fresh and relatable for encouraging student reflection on communication and empathy.

Ho-jin's voice also made an appearance during the 2025–26 Wendy 1st World Tour "W:EALIVE" Encore concerts on February 28 and March 1, 2026. His lines echoed through a darkened theater mid-way through Wendy's performance of her OST "Daydream," transitioning into a stage visual effect of the Milky Way and aurora borealis that Wendy called "the only aurora you can see in Korea." The same song appeared in the Seoul World Fireworks Festival, held on September 5, 2026, at Yeouido Hangang Park as part of Netflix Korea's 10th anniversary celebration. Manhwa artist Namon drew specially commisioned artwork of Ho-jin and Mu-hee for Netflix Korea's 10th Anniversary. The artwork was displayed in the "Netflix Janchi" fan festival on October 24 to 25, 2026, and also printed on the official collaboration merchandise, such as GS21 transportation cards and Musinsa T-shirts.

=== Tourism ===
Travel Alberta and Destination Canada have partnered with Netflix to launch a strategic set-jetting campaign showcasing Alberta by leveraging Ho-jin and Mu-hee's on-screen journey. To drive travel to the region, the tourism boards published official filming location guides featuring the couple in their official websites, while Netflix Canada mapped out the show's southern Alberta settings on its "Netflix In Your Neighbourhood" platform. This tourism promotion is further amplified by marketing collaborations with major airlines, WestJet and Air Canada.

Quarry Lake, Canmore, Canada, was the filming location of Ho-jin and Mu-hee's first kiss.

The campaign delivered measurable results. By February 15, South Korean travel platform Tripbtoz reported that the destinations' accommodation reservations had doubled, with demand centering on Banff and Canmore. On February 18, Hana Tour noted increased interest in the Canadian Rockies, identifying Quarry Lake in Canmore as a frequently requested site. In May, Mark Ham, executive director of Alberta Film Commissions and Cultural Industries, reported over 23,500 views for Travel Alberta's campaign materials, while partners estimated 3,316 bookings generating approximately CA$15 million in economic value. By July, local artist Jason Carter noted a surge in visitors to Quarry Lake which also increased foot traffic to his nearby art gallery.

Due to heightened interest, South Korean travel agencies also introduced specialized tour packages not only to Canada, but also to Japan and Italy. In March 2026 Trip.com reported that interest in Kamakura and Enoshima, the couple's first meeting spots, has increased by 60%, including a 55% jump in hotel searches, a 66% rise in Enoden train bookings, and a 64% increase in local tour reservations. This influx led to overtourism near the featured railway crossing. In response, local authorities installed multilingual signage in late March to protect private properties. In June, Blue House Senior Spokesperson Kang Yoo-jung mentioned in an MBC Radio interview that the series contributes to a significant increase in tourism in the small Tuscan town of Montalcino. Back in April, Italian media also reported similar rises in visitor numbers in Civita di Bagnoregio, Lazio.

== See also ==
- Language interpretation
- List of language interpreters in fiction
