= La hipótesis más peligrosa =

2026 novel by Arturo Pérez-Reverte

- Cover of the first edition
- Author: Arturo Pérez-Reverte
- Language: Spanish
- Genre: Novel
- Publisher: Alfaguara
- Publication date: 20 October 2026
- Publication place: Spain
- Pages: 389

La hipótesis más peligrosa (lit. 'The Most Dangerous Hypothesis') is a 2026 adventure novel by Arturo Pérez-Reverte.

== Premise ==
Cal Gadea, a 16-year-old boy who is very fond of videogames, finds Asier Lerrant, the father he had been looking for his whole life. They set sail aboard the Nostos ship and navigate from one extreme of the Mediterranean sea to another, carrying stolen goods with them.

== Publication ==
Pérez-Reverte, also a columnist, had already written articles about the Mediterranean Sea, one of his lifelong passions, and said that, in order to write the novel, he only needed to put the stories together and provide the result with the protagonist's view.

The first edition, 389 pages long, was published by Alfaguara on 20 October 2026.

== Reception ==
Santos Sanz Villanueva, in a review for El Cultural, wrote that Pérez-Reverte deals with the subject of the Wandering Jew producing "a magnificent literary character" and "celebrating literature's healing power".

María Jesús Solano, in an interview with the author published by Zenda magazine, wrote that, as is usually the case with Pérez-Reverte's novels, characters travel to places he knows well, cities he wandered through and seas he spent nights at.
