= Miracle Mile Murders =

2003 mass murder in Los Angeles, California, United States

Miracle Mile murders
- Location: 630 South Masselin Avenue, Koreatown, Los Angeles
- Date: May 5, 2003
- Attack type: mass murder, home invasion, execution-style murder
- Deaths: 3
- Perpetrator: Robin Kyu Cho
- Motive: Unknown
- Convictions: First degree murder, sentenced to life in prison

The Miracle Mile Murders, also known as the Miracle Mile Massacre or the Koreatown Slayings, was a 2003 mass-murder in Koreatown, Los Angeles. The crime was notorious for its savagery and its apparent lack of motive, and it went cold until March 2009. DNA evidence from the crime scene was ultimately used to tie the murder to Robin Cho, a 56 year old immigrant from Korea. In June 2012, Cho was sentenced to life in prison without the possibility of parole.

== The crime ==
According to LAPD, the nanny Eun Suk and the toddler Nathan were at home on the evening of May 5, 2003, when the killer entered their house, took them into the bathroom, and then shot them. Approximately 30 minutes later, the mother Charis entered the house, where she was bound and gagged with packing tape. She was then killed execution style with a single shot to the head.

Following the crime, detectives received a mysterious tip letter alleging the crime to the work of professionals from South Korea, hired by Byung Song, the husband of the murdered woman, to make room for a girlfriend. The authors of the letter, "Scott Song" and "Jay Lee", were never identified. At trial, prosecutors alleged that the letter was sent by Robin Cho to implicate Byung Song.

While prosecutor Frank Santoro alleged that the murder was a burglary gone wrong, no valuables were stolen from the apartment. Santoro told the jury "Who cares why Mr. Cho committed this murder ... he pulled the trigger six times.” To this day, the motive of the crime remains unknown.

Fragments of Latex glove were found on the tape that had bound Charis. DNA from the glove was later tied to Robin Cho.

== Robin Kyu Cho ==
Robin Kyu Cho immigrated to the United States in the 1970s, where he became a financial agent. Between 1998 and 2003, he was accused of defrauding nearly $2.2 million dollars out of 15 investors, in what prosecutors described as an elaborate Ponzi scheme.

The only hard piece of evidence against Cho was the DNA on the latex glove. Even following his conviction, he continued to maintain his innocence. The California Innocence Project is considering taking his case, as of November 2021.

== List of Victims ==
- Charis Song, age 30 - the mother
- Eun Suk Min, age 56 - the nanny
- Nathan Song, age 2 - the toddler

== Media Coverage ==
The Miracle Mile murders received extensive coverage in the Korean language newspapers of Koreatown in their aftermath. The crime remained perplexing due to the lack of motive and relative weakness of the evidence. In 2021, the murders were featured in a 10 episode podcast called StrangeLand, hosted by Sharon Choi and Ben Adair.
