= El señor del cero =

1997 children's novel

El señor del Cero
- Language: Spanish
- Genre: Children's literature
- Published: 1997 Alfaguara
- Publication place: Spain
- Pages: 153 pages
- ISBN: 9681903889

El señor del cero (English: The Lord of the Zero) is a 1997 children's novel by María Isabel Molina. The book was first published through Alfaguara and follows the character of José, a talented young Mozarab that has to flee his home. The book won a CCEI Award in 1997.

== Synopsis ==
José Ben Alvar Mozarabic lives in Córdoba, where he excelled in school and planned to one day teach. His particularly strong skill in mathematics earns him much praise, but also much envy from a fellow student named Ali Ben Solomon. Ali was especially jealous due to their religious differences, as Ali was Muslim and José was Christian. Two years have passed since the Caliph Al-Hakam proposed peace with the Catalan counties, however Ali and his father do whatever they can to keep José from being awarded a coveted prize for being the best student of the year. They lie and say that José had blasphemed Muhammad, which prompts José to flee to the Catalan where he can't receive the prize or do any serious studies. On his way to Catalonia José makes several friends, one of which is a young nun that can recite mathematical problems. He also meets Emma, the daughter of a man that fled an Arab land. In the end José marries Emma and they live happily in Navarre. The two also send a letter to José's father saying that they would like to go to Toledo and raise a family.
