= Dark Back of Time =

Book by Javier Marías

- First edition
- Author: Javier Marías
- Original title: Negra espalda del tiempo
- Translator: Ester Allen
- Language: Spanish
- Publisher: Alfaguara
- Publication date: 1998
- Publication place: Spain
- English publication date: 2001
- ISBN: 0-8112-1570-9
- OCLC: 57534731

Dark Back of Time is a 1998 book by the Spanish writer Javier Marías. Ester Allen's English translation was published by New Directions in 2001. The book is a meditation on the sources of, and reactions to the author's 1992 novel, All Souls (Todas las almas).
