= Universal translator =

Fictional technology that instantly translates any language

A universal translator is a device common to many science fiction works, especially on television. First described in Murray Leinster's 1945 novella "First Contact", the translator's purpose is to offer an instant translation of any language.

As a convention, it is used to remove the problem of translating between alien languages when it is not vital to the plot. Especially in science fiction television, translating a new language in every episode when a new species is encountered would consume time normally allotted for plot development and would potentially become repetitive to the point of annoyance. Occasionally, intelligent alien races are portrayed as being able to extrapolate the rules of English from little speech and rapidly become fluent in it, making the translator unnecessary.

While a universal translator seems unlikely, scientists continue to work towards similar real-world technologies involving small numbers of known languages.

== General ==
As a rule, a universal translator is instantaneous, but if that language has never been recorded, there is sometimes a time delay until the translator can properly work out a translation, as is true of Star Trek. The operation of these translators is often explained as using some form of telepathy by reading the brain patterns of the speaker(s) to determine what they are saying; some writers seek greater plausibility by instead having computer translation that requires collecting a database of the new language, often by listening to radio transmissions.

The existence of a universal translator tends to raise questions from a logical perspective, such as:

- The continued functioning of the translator even when no device is evident;
- Multiple speakers hear speech in one and only one language (so for example, for a Spanish speaker and a German speaker listening to an Italian speaker the Spanish speaker would only hear Spanish and neither the original Italian nor the translated German, while the German speaker would not hear any Spanish nor Italian but only German);
- Characters' mouths move in sync with the translated words and not the original language;
- The ability for the translator to function in real-time even for languages with different word order (such as a phrase the horse standing in front of the barn would end up in Japanese as 納屋の前に立っている馬, lit. barn-in-front-at-standing-horse; however, there is no delay for the Japanese listener even when the English speaker has yet to mention the barn).

Nonetheless, it removes the need for cumbersome and potentially extensive subtitles, and it eliminates the rather unlikely supposition that every other race in the galaxy has gone to the trouble of learning English.

== Fictional depictions ==
=== Doctor Who ===
Using a telepathic field, the TARDIS automatically translates most comprehensible languages (written and spoken) into a language understood by its pilot and crew. The field also translates what they say into a language appropriate for that time and location (e.g., dialects of Latin). The TARDIS, and by extension a number of its major systems, including the translator, are telepathically linked to its pilot, the Doctor. None of these systems appear able to function reliably when the Doctor is incapacitated.

=== Farscape ===
On the TV show Farscape, John Crichton is injected with bacteria called translator microbes which function as a sort of universal translator. The microbes colonize the host's brainstem and translate anything spoken to the host, passing along the translated information to the host's brain. This does not enable the injected person to speak other languages; they continue to speak their own language and are only understood by others as long as the listeners possess the microbes. The microbes sometimes fail to properly translate slang, translating it literally. Also, the translator microbes cannot translate the natural language of the alien Pilots or Diagnosans because every word in their language can contain thousands of meanings, far too many for the microbes to translate. Some species, such as the Kalish, cannot use translator microbes because their body rejects them, so they must learn a new language through their own efforts.

=== The Hitchhiker's Guide to the Galaxy ===
In the universe of The Hitchhiker's Guide to the Galaxy, universal translation is made possible by the babel fish, a small fish that is inserted into the auditory canal and feeds on mental frequencies. In turn, it creates translations into the brain of its host.

=== Men in Black ===
The Men in Black franchise has a universal translator, which, as Agent K explains in the first film, Men in Black, the Men in Black are not allowed to use because "human thought is so primitive, it's looked upon as an infectious disease in some of the better galaxies".

=== Neuromancer ===
In William Gibson's novel Neuromancer, along with the other novels in his Sprawl trilogy, Count Zero and Mona Lisa Overdrive, devices known as "microsofts" are small chips plugged into "wetware" sockets installed behind the user's ear, giving them certain knowledge or skills as long as they are plugged in, such as the ability to speak another language. The name is a combination of the words "micro" and "soft", and is not named after the software firm Microsoft.

=== Star Control ===
In the Star Control series, almost all races are implied to have universal translators; however, discrepancies between the ways aliens choose to translate themselves sometimes complicate communications. The VUX, for instance, are cited as having uniquely advanced skills in linguistics and can translate human language long before humans are capable of doing the same to the VUX.

The Orz, introduced in Star Control II, have concepts or phenomena for which there are no equivalents in human language. The result is dialogue that is a patchwork of ordinary words and phrases marked with asterisk pairs, indicating that they are loose translations of Orz concepts into human language. In the other direction, the Supox attempt to mimic as many aspects of other species' language and culture as possible, to the point of referring to their own planet as Earth.

In Star Control 3, the K'tang are portrayed as an intellectually inferior species using advanced technology they do not fully understand for intimidation, perhaps explaining why their translators' output is littered with misspellings and nonstandard usages of words. Along the same lines, Daktaklakpak speech is highly stilted and contains many numbers and mathematical expressions, implying that, as a mechanical race, their thought processes are too different from humans' to be directly translated into human language.

=== Star Trek ===
In Star Trek, the universal translator was used by Hoshi Sato, the communications officer on the Enterprise in Star Trek: Enterprise, to invent the linguacode matrix. It was supposedly first used in the late 22nd century on Earth for the instant translation of Earth languages. Gradually, with the removal of language barriers, Earth's disparate cultures came to terms of universal peace. Translations of previously unknown languages, such as those of aliens, required more difficulties to overcome. Unlike most Federation technology, universal translators rarely break down. The episode "Metamorphosis" is the only time in which the device was actually seen; Spock removes the device that had been installed in a shuttlecraft and modifies it so that they can communicate with a non-corporeal alien, using the translator as a hand-held device. By the 24th century, universal translators are built into the communicator pins worn by Starfleet personnel, although there were instances when crew members spoke to newly encountered aliens even when deprived of their communicators.

The Star Trek: The Next Generation Technical Manual says that the universal translator is an "extremely sophisticated computer program" which functions by "analyzing the patterns" of an unknown foreign language, starting from a speech sample of two or more speakers in conversation. The more extensive the conversational sample, the more accurate and reliable is the "translation matrix", enabling instantaneous conversion of verbal utterances or written text between the alien language and American English / Federation Standard.

== Non-fictional translators ==
Microsoft is developing its own translation technology for incorporation into many of their software products and services. Most notably this includes real-time translation of video calls with Skype Translator. As of July 2019, Microsoft Translator supports over 65 languages and can translate video calls between English, French, German, Chinese (Mandarin), Italian, and Spanish.

In 2010, Google announced that it was developing a translator. Using a voice recognition system and a database, a robotic voice recites the translation in the desired language. Google's stated aim is to translate the entire world's information. Roya Soleimani, a spokesperson for Google, said during a 2013 interview demonstrating the translation app on a smartphone, "You can have access to the world's languages right in your pocket... The goal is to become that ultimate Star Trek computer."

The United States Army has also developed a two-way translator for use in Iraq. TRANSTAC (Spoken Language Communication and Translation System for Tactical Use), though, only focuses on Arabic-English translation. The United States Army has scrapped the TRANSTAC Program and is developing in conjunction with DARPA, the BOLT (Broad Operational Language Translation) in its place.

In February 2010, a communications software called VoxOx launched a two-way translator service for instant messaging, SMS, email and social media titled the VoxOx Universal Translator. It enables two people to communicate instantly with each other while both typing in their native languages.

== See also ==
- Interlingual machine translation
- List of language interpreters in fiction
- Mobile translation
- Pivot language
- Phraselator
- Speech translation
- Universal language
- See speech recognition, machine translation and speech synthesis for discussions of real-world natural language processing technologies.
