= Your Face Tomorrow Volume 3: Poison, Shadow and Farewell =

2007 novel by Javier Marías

First edition (publ. Alfaguara)

Your Face Tomorrow: Poison, Shadow and Farewell is a 2007 novel, the third part of the Your Face Tomorrow trilogy by Spanish writer Javier Marías. The original Spanish title of the novel is Tu rostro mañana 3. Veneno y sombra y adiós.
