= Written Lives =

- First edition (Spanish)
- Author: Javier Marías
- Original title: Vidas Escritas
- Translator: Margaret Jull Costa
- Cover artist: Semadar Megged
- Language: Spanish
- Genre: Biography
- Publisher: Ediciones Siruela
- Publication date: 1992
- Publication place: Spain
- English publication date: 2006
- Media type: Print (Paperback)
- ISBN: 978-0-8112-1689-0
- OCLC: 148750126

Written Lives (Spanish: Vidas Escritas) is a collection of biographical sketches of famous literary figures, written by Spanish author Javier Marías and originally published in 1992. Margaret Jull Costa's English translation was published by New Directions in 2006.

The literary figures featured include:

- Djuna Barnes
- Joseph Conrad
- Arthur Conan Doyle
- Isak Dinesen
- Marie du Deffand
- William Faulkner
- Henry James
- James Joyce
- Rudyard Kipling
- Malcolm Lowry
- Thomas Mann
- Yukio Mishima
- Vladimir Nabokov
- Rainer Maria Rilke
- Arthur Rimbaud
- Laurence Sterne
- Robert Louis Stevenson
- Giuseppe Tomasi di Lampedusa
- Ivan Turgenev
- Oscar Wilde

There is also, towards the end of the book, a section entitled 'Fugitive Women', which includes shorter sketches of Emily Brontë, Julie de Lespinasse, Violet Hunt, Vernon Lee, Adah Isaacs Menken and Lady Hester Stanhope. The final chapter, 'Perfect Artists', looks more generally at the tradition of the literary artist.
