= Your Face Tomorrow Volume 1: Fever and Spear =

Book by Javier Marías

Your Face Tomorrow #1: Fever and Spear
- First edition (Spanish)
- Author: Javier Marías
- Original title: Tu rostro mañana #1: Fiebre y lanza
- Translator: Margaret Jull Costa
- Cover artist: Semadar Megged
- Language: Spanish
- Genre: Novel
- Publisher: Alfaguara
- Publication date: 2002
- Publication place: Spain
- English publication date: 2005
- Media type: Print (Paperback)
- ISBN: 978-0-8112-1727-9
- OCLC: 174143671

Your Face Tomorrow, Volume 1: Fever and Spear is a 2002 novel by the Spanish writer Javier Marías. Margaret Jull Costa's English translation was published by New Directions in 2005. Costa won the coveted Valle-Inclán Award for this translation.

== Plot ==
At a dinner at the home of his friend, retired Oxford professor Sir Peter Wheeler, the narrator, Deza, is introduced to Mr. Tupra. Months later he is working for Tupra, giving his interpretations and analysis of the behavior and motivations of a wide range of people. A flashback to the morning after the dinner reveals that Wheeler worked for MI6 during World War II, and that Tupra did similar work. In their conversation, Wheeler tells Deza that the latter shows evidence of being one of the greatest and most perceptive personality analysts of his kind.
