= Tomorrow in the Battle Think on Me =

Novel by Javier Marías

- First edition (Spanish)
- Author: Javier Marías
- Original title: Mañana en la batalla piensa en mí
- Translator: Margaret Jull Costa
- Cover artist: Matthias Grünewald, detail from Isenheim Altarpiece, c.1512-16,
- Language: Spanish
- Genre: Novel
- Publisher: Anagrama
- Publication date: 1994
- Publication place: Spain
- English publication date: 1996
- ISBN: 0-8112-1482-6
- OCLC: 47208599

Tomorrow in the Battle Think on Me (Spanish: Mañana en la batalla piensa en mí) is a novel by Javier Marías that was first published in 1994. Margaret Jull Costa's English translation was published by The Harvill Press in 1996, winner of the Rómulo Gallegos award and the Femina Award. The title of the 368-page novel is taken from William Shakespeare's Richard III, Act V, Scene 3.

When his would-be lover, another man's wife, dies suddenly in his arms, the narrator Victor is faced with the dilemma of whether to contact help or her family, or to quit the scene without admitting his presence, and chooses the latter option. This brings about many unforeseen consequences for the narrator and for others. The protagonist's profession is that of ghostwriter.

== Literary significance and reception ==
The novel garnered acclaim in Europe. Michael Wood, writing in the London Review of Books, wrote "Tomorrow in the Battle Think on Me, probably offers the deepest immersion in Marías's haunted universe." A reviewer in Kirkus Reviews criticized "Victor's exhaustively extended digressive monologues, which are filled with apposite but monotonous Shakespearean quotations". Though the reviewer still praised the character's complexity and described the novel as "intriguing psychodrama of sex, guilt, and social satire".

In The New York Times, Liam Callanan wrote that the novel's construction "is occasionally breathtaking but more often overtaxed by Marías's penchant for allusive detail. Chasing associations across continents and centuries, [Marías] assembles layers of meaning that, at their best, are dazzling, but otherwise trail off into dizzy ponderousness." A reviewer in Publishers Weekly described the novel as "rather forced and drawn-out [...] the main impression Marias's novel leaves is of an author trying to impose a philosophic pattern on material that resists it."
