= Sharon Choi =

Korean-American interpreter and filmmaker

- 최성재
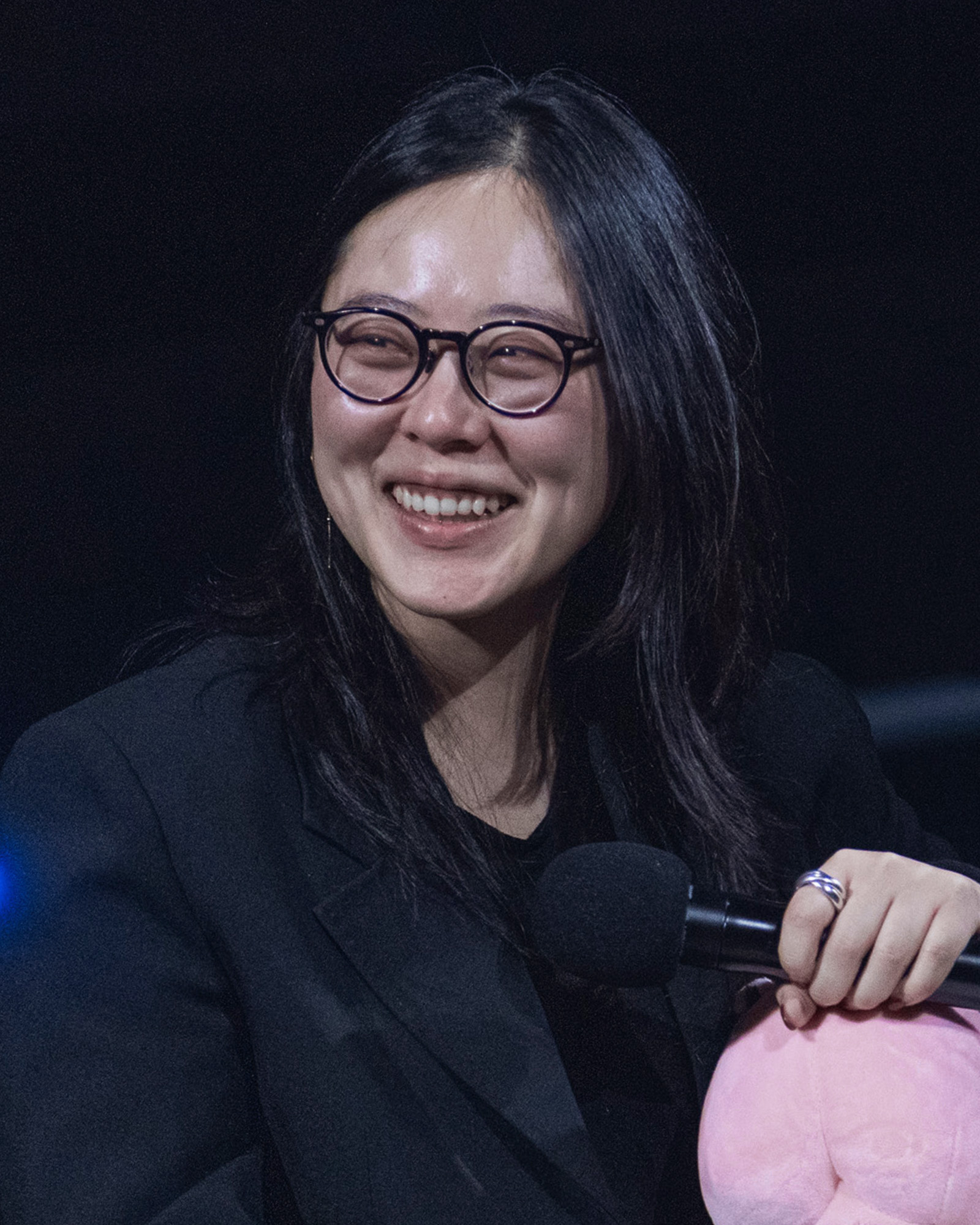
- Choi in 2025
- Born: Choi Sung-jae; 1993 (age 32–33); Seoul, South Korea
- Education: University of Southern California
- Occupations: Interpreter; director

Korean name
- Hangul: 최성재
- RR: Choe Seongjae
- MR: Ch'oe Sŏngjae

Sharon Choi (born Choi Sung-jae; 1993) is a South Korean interpreter and film director. She came to prominence as director Bong Joon-ho's Korean–English interpreter during the 2019–20 film awards season, which saw Bong's film Parasite winning the Palme d'Or and the Academy Award for Best Picture. During both ceremonies and others, Choi assisted Bong and other Parasite cast and crew members, such as actor Song Kang-ho, in delivering award acceptance speeches. During such appearances, Choi's interpreting skills garnered significant media attention and praise.

Choi later served as a dialect coach for actress Greta Lee on the 2023 film Past Lives, which was also nominated for the Academy Award for Best Picture.

== Early life and education ==
Choi was born in 1993 in Seoul, South Korea. She moved to the United States at a young age and returned to Korea when she was ten years old. Choi attended the Hankuk Academy of Foreign Studies in Yongin and the School of Cinematic Arts at the University of Southern California.

== Career ==
During the press tour for the 2018 film Burning, Choi interpreted for director Lee Chang-dong. She met Bong Joon-ho in April 2019 when she was asked to interpret for one of his phone interviews, and accompanied him at the 2019 Cannes Film Festival, where his film Parasite won the Palme d'Or. Choi continued as Bong's interpreter throughout the 2019–2020 film awards season, including at the 77th Golden Globe Awards, the 72nd Writers Guild of America Awards, and the 92nd Academy Awards. In April 2021, she interpreted for Bong as he presented the award for Best Director at the 93rd Academy Awards.

The success of Parasite resulted in widespread visibility for Choi, and she received praise from industry figures and audiences for her nuanced interpretations of Bong's speeches and interviews. Zack Sharf of IndieWire described Choi as "the undisputed MVP of Oscar season", and The Korea Herald credited her with generating excitement for Parasite among American audiences in the run-up to the Academy Awards. Some people in South Korea practiced English by watching videos of Choi's interpretations. She gained an internet fanbase and was frequently praised on Twitter and in the comments sections of Bong's interviews. In July 2020, she received the YoungSan Diplomat Award from the nonprofit Seoul Forum for International Affairs for "her role in enhancing South Korea's national image".

In addition to her work as an interpreter, Choi is a film director and producer. She directed Self Portrait, a short film that was screened at CAAMFest in 2019. She co-produced the 2020 short film Mother of Three, directed by Han Jun-hee. In February 2020, TheWrap reported that Choi was working on a screenplay about the awards season. She later refuted the reports in a Variety essay and instead announced that she was writing a screenplay for a film set in Korea. Bong himself has publicly expressed interest in Choi's scripts.

In 2021, Choi served as a dialect coach for actress Greta Lee on the 2023 film Past Lives, directed by Celine Song. Lee praised her agility with translating between Korean and English, calling her a "genius". Past Lives was later nominated for Best Picture at the 96th Academy Awards. In 2021, Choi also hosted the StrangeLand audio podcast alongside Ben Adair, about the 2003 Miracle Mile Murders in Koreatown.
