= When I Was Mortal =

Book by Javier Marías

- First edition (Spanish)
- Author: Javier Marías
- Original title: Cuando fui mortal
- Translator: Margaret Jull Costa
- Language: Spanish
- Genre: Short Story Collection
- Publisher: Alfaguara (Spanish); New Directions (English)
- Publication date: 1996
- Publication place: Spain
- English publication date: 1999
- Media type: Print (paperback)
- ISBN: 0-8112-1516-4
- OCLC: 228127905

When I Was Mortal (Original Spanish title: Cuando fui mortal) is a short story collection by the Spanish writer Javier Marías. It was translated into English by Margaret Jull Costa and published in the United Kingdom in 1999 by The Harvill Press and in the United States in 2000 by New Directions.

The story "Everything Bad Comes Back" is based on the author's friendship with Aliocha Coll, who died by suicide in Paris in 1990.
