= The Infatuations =

2011 novel by Javier Marías

- First edition (Spanish)
- Author: Javier Marías
- Original title: Los Enamoramientos
- Translator: Margaret Jull Costa
- Language: Spanish
- Genre: Novel
- Set in: Madrid
- Publisher: Alfaguara
- Publication date: 2011
- Publication place: Spain
- English publication date: 2013

The Infatuations (Spanish: Los enamoramientos) is a National Novel Prize-winning novel by Spanish author Javier Marías, published in 2011. The translation into English by Margaret Jull Costa was published by Hamish Hamilton in 2013.

It was shortlisted for the 2014 National Book Critics Circle Award (Fiction).

== Plot ==
The novel tells the story of literary editor María Dolz, who, through the daily vision of a couple in love in her favorite café, perceives a situation that she finds much more pleasant than the bad novels she has to deal with at her job. From one day to the next, however, the couple disappears and Maria learns what happened from the newspaper. The man was Miguel Deverne, a film businessman who was stabbed to death by the vagrant Luis Felipe Vázquez Canella.

Maria tries to get close to Luisa, Miguel's widow, and they become friends. Also in Luisa's entourage is Desvern's best friend, Javier Díaz-Varela, with whom María falls in love, although she quickly realizes that the latter's ties to the young widow are most ambiguous. Javier, once a restless womanizer with no need for commitment, is obsessively in love with Luisa and only awaits the day when the mourning for the loss of her husband subsides. Javier's intense care for Luisa seems suspicious to Maria. Overhearing a conversation, she notices the obvious connection between Miguel's death and Javier. Javier admits to blackmailing the drifter into killing Desvern, which he justifies by citing Miguel's apparently terminal illness. After the failed relationship with Javier, Maria investigates the murder on the internet and is surprised why none of the journalists mention the fateful diagnosis about Miguel. Did Javier want to eliminate a rival? Two years later, Maria attends a business lunch, and a few moments later Luisa and Javier also appear, wearing identical rings. Maria thinks that Javier has achieved his goal.

== Reception ==
In 2019 it was listed as one of the hundred best books of the 21st century by The Guardian: "Marías constructs an elegant murder mystery from his trademark labyrinthine sentences, but this investigation is in pursuit of much meatier questions than whodunnit."
