= A Heart So White =

1992 novel by Javier Marías

- First edition (Spanish)
- Author: Javier Marías
- Original title: Corazón tan blanco
- Translator: Margaret Jull Costa
- Cover artist: Henri Gervex, Rolla - 1878
- Language: Spanish
- Genre: Novel
- Publisher: Editorial Anagrama S.A., Barcelona
- Publication date: 1992
- Publication place: Spain
- English publication date: 1995 (The Harvill Press)
- Media type: Print
- OCLC: 52084231

A Heart So White (Spanish: Corazón tan blanco) is a novel by Javier Marías which was first published in Spain in 1992. Margaret Jull Costa's English translation was first published by The Harvill Press in 1995. The book received the International Dublin Literary Award in 1997.

In 2010, Alfaguara presented a commemorative edition for the 25th anniversary. It includes, in a case, two hardcover volumes: the novel and the dossier, with six texts by the author about his book, images of the original manuscript, reviews of the reception of the book, interviews, articles by specialists in the work by Marías and an unpublished letter from Juan Benet to Marías about the work. An edition was published by Penguin Books in 2012, with an introduction by Jonathan Coe.

== Plot ==
The narrator, Juan, seeks to use his newlywed wife, Luisa's, closeness to his father to learn more about the man's two marriages before that to Juan's mother. The first wife is unnamed and she was kept secret from Juan. She died and his widowed father remarried.

Juan learns the second was the older sister of his own mother. She shot herself dead shortly after the marriage, and his father was widowed again.

== Reception ==
The New York Times wrote "Marías's challenging and seductive technique reaches its pinnacle in A Heart So White." The Independent wrote that it "starts from a suicide to explore the secrets of two marriages with all the hypnotic, even sinister, beauty of his style." BOMB magazine described the novel as "traditional" and "refreshingly un-American." Marías and the translator Margaret Jull Costa were the joint winners of the International Dublin Literary Awards.
