= Javier Marías =

Spanish novelist, translator, and columnist (1951–2022)

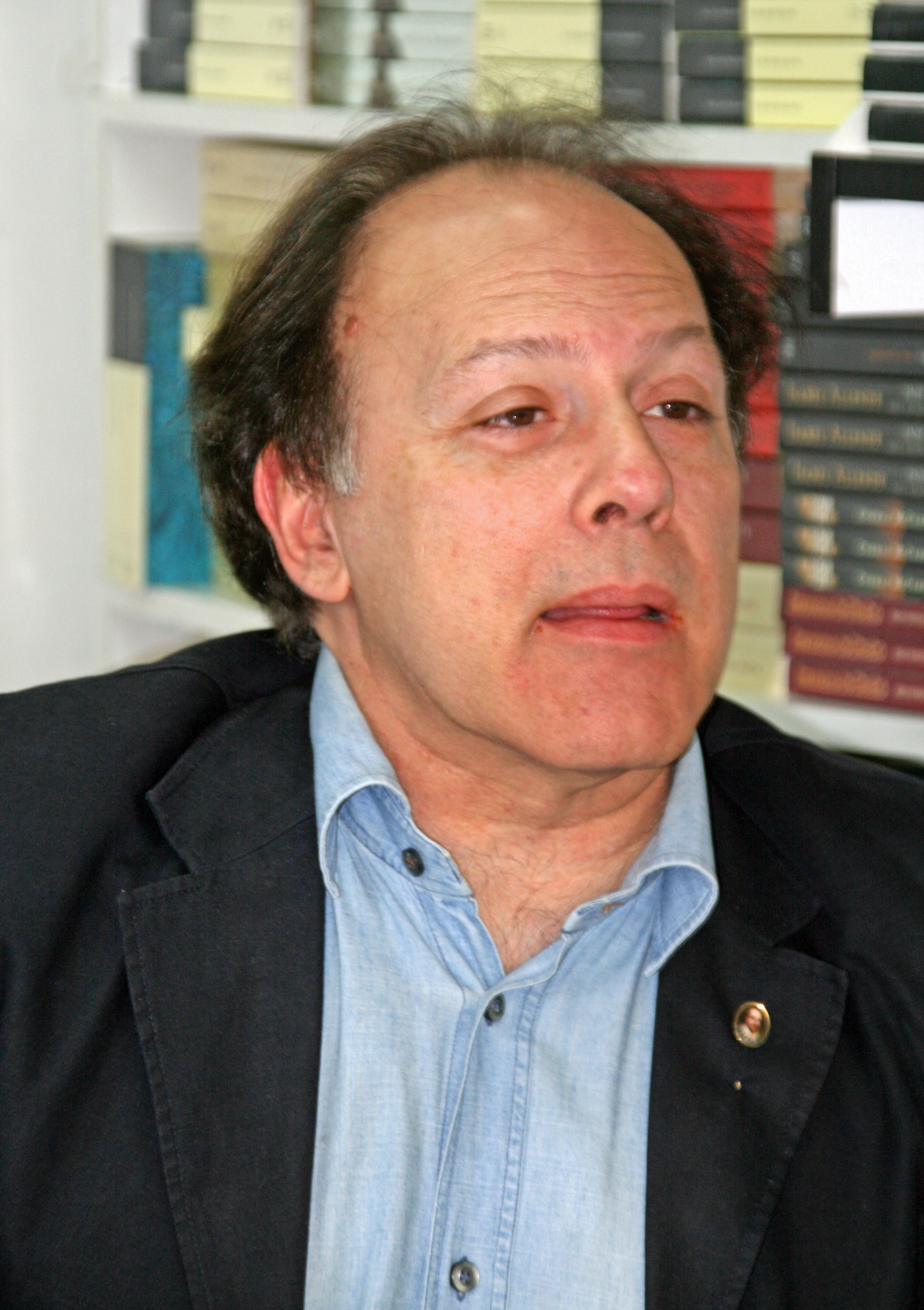
- Marías in 2008
- Born: Javier Marías Franco; 20 September 1951; Madrid, Spain
- Died: 11 September 2022 (aged 70); Madrid, Spain
- Occupations: Novelist; translator; columnist
- Relatives: Julián Marías (father); Jess Franco (uncle); Ricardo Franco (cousin)
- Writing career
- Notable works: All Souls, A Heart So White, Tomorrow In The Battle Think On Me, Your Face Tomorrow

Seat R of the Real Academia Española
- In office 27 April 2008 (Note: Elected on 29 June 2006) – 11 September 2022
- Preceded by: Fernando Lázaro Carreter
- Succeeded by: Javier Cercas
- Website: javiermarias.es

Javier Marías Franco (Spanish: [xaˈβjeɾ maˈɾias ˈfɾaŋko]; 20 September 1951 – 11 September 2022) was a Spanish author, translator, and columnist. Marías published fifteen novels, including A Heart So White (Corazón tan blanco, 1992), Tomorrow in the Battle Think on Me (Mañana en la batalla piensa en mí, 1994) and the Your Face Tomorrow trilogy, widely regarded as his greatest achievement. In addition to his novels, he also published three collections of short stories and various essays. As one of Spain's most celebrated novelists, his books have been translated into forty-six languages and sold close to nine million copies internationally. He received several awards for his work, such as the Rómulo Gallegos Prize (1995), the International IMPAC Dublin Literary Award (1997), the International Nonino Prize (2011), and the Austrian State Prize for European Literature (2011).

Marías studied philosophy and literature at the Complutense University of Madrid before going on to teach at several universities, including his alma mater, universities in Oxford and Venice, and Wellesley College in Massachusetts. In 1997, he was awarded the title of King of the Kingdom of Redonda by its predecessor Jon Wynne-Tyson for his understanding of the kingdom and for mentioning the story of one of its previous kings, John Gawsworth, in his novel All Souls (Todas las almas, 1989).

== Life ==
Javier Marías Franco was born in Madrid on 20 September 1951. His father was the philosopher Julián Marías, who was briefly imprisoned and then banned from teaching for opposing Franco (the father of the protagonist of Your Face Tomorrow was given a similar biography). His mother was the writer Dolores Franco Manera. Marías was the fourth of five sons. Two of his siblings were art historian Fernando and film critic and economist Miguel. He was the nephew and cousin of, respectively, filmmakers Jesús "Jess" Franco and Ricardo Franco. Marías spent parts of his childhood in the United States, where his father taught at various institutions, including Yale University and Wellesley College. His mother died when Javier was 26 years old. He was educated at the Colegio Estudio in Madrid. After having returned to Madrid, Marías studied philosophy and literary sciences at the Complutense University of Madrid from 1968 to 1973. From the 1970s onwards, he was involved in translating English literary works into the Spanish language. His first literary employment consisted of translating Dracula scripts for his maternal uncle, Jesús Franco.

=== Writing ===
Marías began writing in earnest at an early age. "The Life and Death of Marcelino Iturriaga", one of the short stories in While the Women are Sleeping (2010), was written when he was just 14. He ran away from home to write his first novel and went to live with his uncle in Paris. He began writing Los dominios del lobo (The Dominions of the Wolf), at the age of 17. It was about an American family and according to him, it was written in the morning hours. The novel is dedicated to the Spanish author Juan Benet, who managed to compel the publisher Edhasa to print the book, and to Vicente Molina Foix, who provided him with the title. In later years he considered himself an "evening-time" writer. The novel Travesía del horizonte (Voyage Along the Horizon) was an adventure story about an expedition to Antarctica.

His translations included work by Updike, Hardy, Conrad, Nabokov, Faulkner, James, Stevenson, and Browne. In 1979, he won the Spanish national award for translation for his version of Sterne's Tristram Shandy. Between 1983 and 1985, Marías lectured in Spanish literature and translation at the University of Oxford.

In 1986, Marías published El hombre sentimental (The Man of Feeling), and in 1989 he published Todas las almas (All Souls), which was set at Oxford University. The Spanish film director Gracia Querejeta released El Último viaje de Robert Rylands (Robert Rylands' Last Journey), adapted from Todas las almas, in 1996.

His 1992 novel Corazón tan blanco is centered on Juan, a translator for the United Nations (UN), and its English version A Heart So White was translated by Margaret Jull Costa. It was received well by the literary critics and won the Spanish Critics Award. Marías and Costa were joint winners of the 1997 International Dublin Literary Award. In his 1994 novel, Mañana en la batalla piensa en mí, the protagonist is a ghostwriter.

The protagonists of the novels written since 1986 are all interpreters or translators of one kind or another, based on his own experience as a translator and teacher of translation at Oxford University. Of these protagonists, Marías wrote, "They are people who are renouncing their own voices."

In 2002 Marías published Tu rostro mañana 1. Fiebre y lanza (Your Face Tomorrow 1: Fever and Spear), the first part of a trilogy which was his most ambitious literary project. The first volume is dominated by a translator, an elderly don based on an actual professor emeritus of Spanish studies at Oxford University, Sir Peter Russell. The second volume, Tu rostro mañana 2. Baile y sueño (Your Face Tomorrow 2: Dance and Dream), was published in 2004. In 2007, Marías completed the final installment, Tu rostro mañana 3. Veneno y sombra y adiós (Your Face Tomorrow 3: Poison, Shadow and Farewell). In 2009, the trilogy was published as one single volume.

It was followed by the novel Los enamoramientos (The Infatuations) in 2011, a story about a woman drawn into a murder mystery. The novel won the state-run National novel prize, but Marías rejected the award saying he did not want to be indebted to a government of any kind.

He also was a regular contributor to El País, whose editor-in-chief Pepa Bueno lamented his death and called it a sad day for Spanish literature. In 2005–2006, an English version of his column, "La Zona Fantasma", appeared in the monthly magazine The Believer.

=== Redonda ===
After having been awarded the title, King of Redonda, he was also known as Xavier I. and, from 2000 onwards, Marías operated a small publishing house under the name of Reino de Redonda. Its first book of the publishing house was La mujer de Huguenin by the first King of Redondo and author M. P. Shiel. Marías's novel, Todas las almas (All Souls), included a portrayal of the poet John Gawsworth, who was also the third King of Redonda. Although the fate of this monarchy after the death of Gawsworth is contested, the portrayal by Marías so affected the "reigning" king, Jon Wynne-Tyson, that he abdicated and left the throne to Marías in 1997. This course of events was chronicled in his "false novel," Negra espalda del tiempo (Dark Back of Time). The book was inspired by the reception of Todas las almas by many people who, falsely according to Marías, believed they were the source of the characters in Todas las almas. After "taking the throne" of Redonda, Marías began a publishing imprint named Reino de Redonda ("Kingdom of Redonda").

Marías conferred many titles during his reign upon people he liked, including upon Pedro Almodóvar (Duke of Trémula), António Lobo Antunes (Duke of Cocodrilos), John Ashbery (Duke of Convexo), Pierre Bourdieu (Duke of Desarraigo), William Boyd (Duke of Brazzaville), Michel Braudeau (Duke of Miranda), A. S. Byatt (Duchess of Morpho Eugenia), Guillermo Cabrera Infante (Duke of Tigres), Pietro Citati (Duke of Remonstranza), Francis Ford Coppola (Duke of Megalópolis), Agustín Díaz Yanes (Duke of Michelín), Roger Dobson (Duke of Bridaespuela), Frank Gehry (Duke of Nervión), Francis Haskell (Duke of Sommariva), Eduardo Mendoza (Duke of Isla Larga), Ian Michael (Duke of Bernal), Orhan Pamuk (Duke of Colores), Arturo Pérez-Reverte (Duke of Corso), Francisco Rico (Duke of Parezzo), Sir Peter Russell (Duke of Plazatoro), Fernando Savater (Duke of Caronte), W. G. Sebald (Duke of Vértigo), Jonathan Coe (Duke of Prunes), Luis Antonio de Villena (Duke of Malmundo), and Juan Villoro (Duke of Nochevieja).

=== Premio Reino de Redonda ===
Marías created a literary prize, the Premio Reino de Redonda to be judged by the dukes and duchesses. The jury was of extraordinary prominence, comprising the dukes mentioned below and other figures such as Francis Ford Coppola. In addition to prize money, the winners, listed below, received a duchy:

- 2001 – J. M. Coetzee (Duke of Deshonra)
- 2002 – John H. Elliott (Duke of Simancas)
- 2003 – Claudio Magris (Duke of Segunda Mano)
- 2004 – Éric Rohmer (Duke of Olalla)
- 2005 – Alice Munro (Duchess of Ontario)
- 2006 – Ray Bradbury (Duke of Diente de León)
- 2007 – George Steiner (Duke of Girona)
- 2008 – Umberto Eco (Duke of la Isla del Día de Antes)
- 2009 – Marc Fumaroli (Duke of Houyhnhnms)
- 2010 – Milan Kundera
- 2011 – Ian McEwan (Duke of the black dogs)

== Death ==
Marías died of pneumonia at the age of 70.The Spanish novelist Eduardo Mendoza remembered him as the best writer in Spain at the time of his death, and one who wrote female characters the best.

== Awards and honours ==
- 1979: Fray Luis de León Translation Award (Germanic languages) for Tristram Shandy
- 1986: Premio Herralde for El hombre sentimental
- 1989: Barcelona City Award (Spanish literature, narrative) for Todas las almas
- 1992: Premio de la Crítica Española
- 1995: Romulo Gallegos Prize for Mañana en la batalla piensa en mí (Tomorrow in the Battle Think on Me)
- 1995: Fastenrath Award (Real Academia Española) for Mañana en la batalla piensa en mí
- 1996: Prix Femina étranger for Demain dans la bataille pense à moi (Mañana en la batalla piensa en mí)
- 1997: Nelly Sachs Prize
- 1997: International Dublin Literary Award for A Heart So White
- 2000: Grinzane Cavour Prize
- 2008: Marías was elected to Seat R of the Real Academia Española on 29 June 2006. He took up his seat on 27 April 2008. At his investiture he agreed with Robert Louis Stevenson that the work of novelists is "pretty childish," but also argued that it is impossible to narrate real events, and that "you can only fully tell stories about what has never happened, the invented and imagined."
- 2010: America Award for a lifetime contribution to international writing
- 2011: International Nonino Prize in Italy
- 2011: Austrian State Prize for European Literature
- 2013: Prix Formentor
- 2013: National Book Critics Circle Award (fiction) shortlist for The Infatuations
- 2017: LIBAR 2017 Award for the most outstanding Hispano-American author.
- 2021: Elected a Royal Society of Literature International Writer

== Works ==
All English translations by Margaret Jull Costa unless otherwise indicated.

=== Novels ===
- Los dominios del lobo (1971)
- Travesía del horizonte (1973). Voyage Along the Horizon, translated by Kristina Cordero (McSweeney's, 2006)
- El monarca del tiempo (1978)
- El siglo (1983)
- El hombre sentimental (1986). The Man of Feeling (U.S.: New Directions/UK: The Harvill Press, 2003)
- Todas las almas (1989). All Souls (The Harvill Press, 1992; New Directions, 2000)
- Corazón tan blanco (1992). A Heart So White (The Harvill Press, 1995; New Directions, 2002)
- Mañana en la batalla piensa en mí (1994). Tomorrow in the Battle Think on Me (The Harvill Press, 1996; New Directions, 2001)
- Negra espalda del tiempo (1998). Dark Back of Time, translated by Esther Allen (New Directions, 2001; Chatto & Windus, 2003)
- Tu rostro mañana 1. Fiebre y lanza (2002). Your Face Tomorrow 1: Fever and Spear (U.S.: New Directions/UK: Chatto & Windus, 2005)
- Tu rostro mañana 2. Baile y sueño (2004). Your Face Tomorrow 2: Dance and Dream (U.S.: New Directions/UK: Chatto & Windus, 2006)
- Tu rostro mañana 3. Veneno y sombra y adiós (2007). Your Face Tomorrow 3: Poison, Shadow and Farewell (U.S.: New Directions/UK: Chatto & Windus, 2009)
- Los enamoramientos (2011). The Infatuations (U.S.: Knopf/UK: Hamish Hamilton, 2013) Marías, Javier; Jull Costa, Margaret (2013). The Infatuations. Knopf. ISBN 978-0307960726.
- Así empieza lo malo (2014). Thus Bad Begins (U.S.: Knopf/UK: Hamish Hamilton, 2016)
- Berta Isla (2017). Berta Isla (US: Knopf/UK: Hamish Hamilton, 2018)
- Tomás Nevinson (2021)

=== Novellas and short stories ===
- Mientras ellas duermen (1990). While the Women Are Sleeping (U.S.: New Directions/UK: Chatto & Windus, 2010)
- Cuando fui mortal (1996). When I Was Mortal (The Harvill Press, 1999; New Directions, 2000)
- Mala índole (1996). Bad Nature, or With Elvis in Mexico, translated by Esther Allen (New Directions, 2010)

=== Anthologies ===
- Between Eternities & Other Writings (U.S.: Penguin/UK: Hamish Hamilton, 2017). Later compiled in Spanish as Entre Eternidades. Y otros escritos (2018)

=== Nonfiction ===
- Vidas escritas (1992). Written Lives (U.S.: New Directions/UK: Canongate, 2006). Multiple short literary biographies.
- Venice, an interior (2016) (London: Penguin Books, 2016)
