= Alfaguara =

Spanish publisher

- Parent company: Penguin Random House
- Founded: 1964; 62 years ago
- Country of origin: Spain
- Headquarters location: Madrid
- Distribution: Spain, Latin America
- Official website: www.alfaguara.com

Alfaguara is a Spanish-language publishing house that serves markets in Hispanic America, Spain and the United States. It was founded by the Spanish writer and Nobel Prize winner Camilo José Cela.

== History and profile ==
Alfaguara was established in 1964. In 1980 it become part of Editoriales del Grupo Santillana. In March 2000 Santillana, which publishes over 117 million books each year, was acquired by the Spanish conglomerate PRISA. In 2014, PRISA sold Santillana's trade operations to Penguin Random House.

It awards the Alfaguara Prize, a prestigious Spanish-language literary award. The prize, launched in 1998, goes to an unpublished work of fiction in Spanish.

Alfaguara Infantil and Alfaguara Juvenil publish books for children and young people.

== Publications ==
- El señor del cero (1997)
