= Censorship in Portugal =

Censorship was an essential element of Portuguese national culture throughout the country's history up until the Carnation Revolution in 1974. From its earliest history Portugal was subject to laws limiting freedom of expression. This was mainly due to the influence of the Church since the time of Ferdinand I, who requested that Pope Gregory XI institute episcopal censorship. Later, the censorship would also apply to the publication of other written works. Portuguese citizens still remember the Estado Novo's censorship policy, institutionalizing strict control over the media, resorting to measures used previously against newspapers and systematic sequestering of books. In fact, every political regime was very careful with the legislation related to the area of press freedom—in most cases restricting it. In the five centuries of the history of Portuguese press, four were marked by censorship.

Portuguese history was marked by many forms of intellectual persecution. Those who dared to freely express thoughts that were contrary to official discourse were frequently punished with prison or public death.

== Beginnings of censorship ==
The first books known with some certainty to have been censored by the Portuguese monarchy were the works of Jan Hus and John Wycliff, which were banned, confiscated and ordered to be burned on August 18, 1451, by Afonso V.

Later, there is mention of suppression by Manuel I of the distribution of Lutheran texts, which earned him a commendation from Pope Leo X on August 20, 1521.

== Inquisitorial censorship ==
With the start of the Portuguese Inquisition following the papal bull Cum ad nihil magis of May 23, 1536, teaching Judaism to "New Christians", and the use of vernacular translations of the Bible were prohibited. Three types of censorship thus became evident: ecclesiastical, royal, and ordinary.

The earliest existing documentation of publication licences refer to the works of Baltazar Dias in 1537 as well as to the Cartinha, an introduction to João de Barros' Grammar, in 1539.

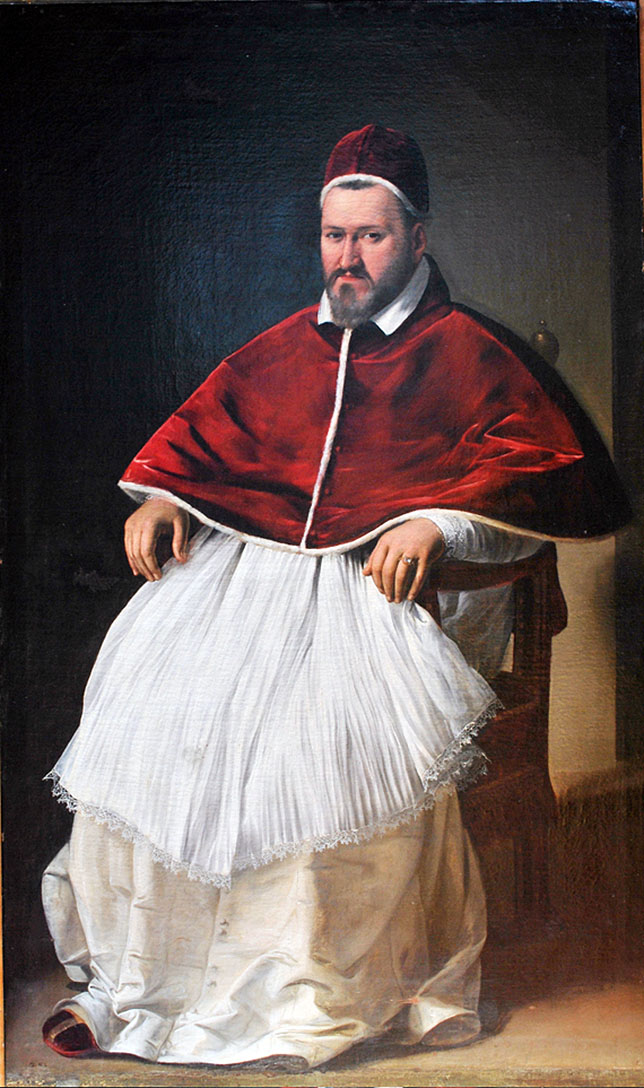
Pope Paul V, promoter of the first Roman Index, known for his severity and inspired by Portuguese censorship regulations

On November 2, 1540, Henry I, who had been named Grand Inquisitor by John III, gave to the prior of the Dominicans the authority to verify the type of books sold in both public and private libraries, as well as to prohibit the granting of the Imprimatur, the Church's permission, to any book without prior examination. In 1598, the General Inquisitor António de Matos Noronha conceded this privilege to other clerical orders, as the Dominicans had a monopoly on the review of books.

On July 16, 1547, the restrictions were lessened somewhat due to the directives in the bull Meditatis cordis, although the first edition of the Index Librorum Prohibitorum in Portugal appeared in 1515, as a consequence of the Fifth Council of the Lateran. The Index virtually reproduced the lists of books proscribed by the Sorbonne in 1544 and by the Université catholique de Louvain in 1546.

As a consequence of the Inquisition's discovery that foreign-born professors were in possession of prohibited books, monitoring of books was extended to customs. They began to verify the orthodoxy of books entering the country in greater detail. A second edition of the Index was published on July 4, 1551, in which the Portuguese censors expanded the list of works prohibited by the theologians of Leuven to include the books catalogued by the Swiss scholar Conrad Gesner in their Bibliotheca Universalis, in addition to other works, seven folios of Gil Vicente among them. This would be the first Portuguese Index to be created, and would be published in all national territories by the Inquisitors who had, according to Inquisition order, to take in and note all found books and report their owners to the Inquisition itself.

In 1557, Pope Paul IV, due to pressure from the University of Leuven and Charles I of Spain, ordered the creation of the Roman Index, where owners of forbidden books were sentenced to 'latae sententitae' excommunication (implying automatic excommunication) and "perpetual infamy". Such severity, even for those times, brought a wave of panic to European booksellers, dealers, and intellectuals. Portugal was no exception.

In 1561, the Dominican Francisco Foreiro signed a new Portuguese Index, by order of then-Cardinal Henry I, who wrote as introduction to it a letter in which, while not being as hostile as the one by the Holy See, proclaimed the need for "preventive Censorship".

On October 21, 1561, the Grand Inquisitor defined the duties of the "Carrack inspectors", who would inspect the works brought from foreign lands by sea.

Censorship efforts in Portugal were openly recognized by Pope Pius IV, who appointed Friar Francisco Foreiro to head the commission of the Council of Trent, responsible for reviewing Paul IV's Index.

The Portuguese friar was the author of the rules that preceded the Synod's Index, published by Pope Paul V, and that would later be used in all upcoming Indexes. The Index of Trent was published in the Portuguese capital of Lisbon in the same year, with an addendum called Rol dos livros que neste Reino se proibem (Roll of the books which in this Kingdom are forbidden - List of banned books). This list would be added to all subsequent editions of the Index in Portugal.

King Sebastian of Portugal, enacting a law on June 18, 1571, had an important role in censorship legislation defining the civil penalties for Index infractors. He defined a fine of from a fourth to a half of the infractors' legal possessions, plus the penalty of exile in Brazil or an African colony. Death sentences were also not uncommon. Apprehended books were burned and burnings were supervised by clerics.

== Portuguese Indexes until the end of the Inquisition ==
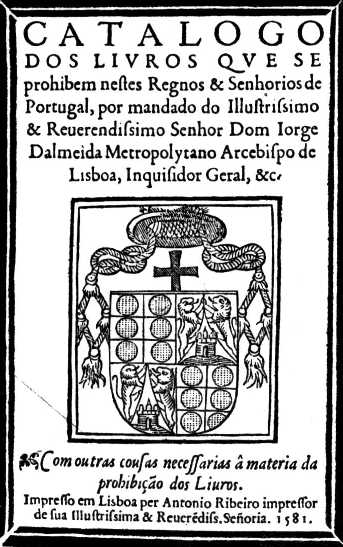
Catalog of the books which are forbidden in this Kingdoms and Lordships of Portugal. 1581

In 1581, Jorge de Almeida, Archbishop of Lisbon, published a new Index in which the Tridentine document is reprinted.

The Holy Inquisition Council's Regulations of March 1, 1570 stated that all local inquisitors no longer had authority over preventive censorship, centralizing their functions on the Inquisitorial Council .

In 1596, Pope Clement VIII publishes an Index, the last one of the century, which was translated and reprinted in Lisbon the next year.

The Philippine Orders of 1603, from Philip II's regency, reaffirm the mandatory character civil preventive censorship, as had been established by King Sebastian.

In 1624, Great Inquisitor Fernando Martins Mascarenhas created, with the help of Jesuit Baltasar Álvares, the first Index of the 17th century, which had a new feature: general guidance - the rules of the Portuguese Catalogue - besides the ones from the Universal Roman Catalogue. The Index consisted, therefore, of three parts: the Tridentine Index, the Index pro Regnis Lusitaniae, and a section detailing the content to be removed from any book published about the Scriptures, philosophy, theology, the occult, and even science and literature. This Index would be in use until the 18th century.

A decree of April 29, 1722 created an exception to this regulations, by freeing the Royal Academy of History from any kind of censorship, especially Inquisitional.

With the establishment of the liberal regime in Portugal, the Inquisition came to an end, and its censorship with it.

== Royal Censorial Court ==
The Marquis of Pombal simplified the process of book censorship by institutionalizing one sole court, called Real Mesa Censória (Royal Censorial Court), and appointing as its president noted linguist and writer Manuel do Cenáculo, the same man who inspired him to found the National Library. He also minimized the censorship against "heretical actions", instead directing the repression against the Freemasons and the Jesuits, both seen as threats to the Royalty. Indeed, the greatest focus in King Joseph I's reign was the utter elimination of any obstacles whatsoever in the way of complete monarchical power. The monarchy was seen as the absolute sovereign authority, with the divine right to rule.

A new law passed on April 5, 1768 reaffirmed the right of "temporal sovereignty" over the prohibition of "pernicious books and papers" in the interest of political defense. This law actually prohibited even certain documents issued by the Holy See like the In Coena Domini bull of 1792 (which reserved exclusively to the Pope powers now claimed by the Monarch) and the Expurgation Indexes.

These indexes, like the one from 1624, were presented as a subversive scheme by the Jesuits of the Colégio de Santo Antão (an important education institution of the time).

It was also through this law that the Real Mesa Censória was instituted, unifying the previous three censorship departments, and directed by "Censores Régios" (Royal Censors), including an Inquisitor from Lisbon and the Vicar-General of the Patriarchy. The Court was presented as a "Junta", with "private and exclusive jurisdiction on anything regarding the exam, approval or reproval of books and papers", publishing regular edicts on listing banned works.

The Regimento da Real Mesa Censória (Charter of the Royal Censorial Court) of May 18, 1768, makes provisions for the inspection of bookshops, libraries and printing presses. Works that conveyed superstitious, atheistic, or heretical ideas were forbidden, even though exceptions were provided for some works by Protestant scholars. Such works were accepted in "well governed and prudent (wise) Roman Catholic States", being tolerated only thanks to the provisions contained in the peace of Westphalia treaties, and because their erudition was recognized and deemed useful for the Portuguese scholars. Works by Hugo Grotius, Samuel von Pufendorf, Jean Barbeyrac, among others, were accepted, although they supported some heterodox views. Voltaire also risked being completely banned in Portugal. That was at least the intent of António Pereira de Figueiredo, but the Dominican friar Francisco de São Bento decided against censoring works of history and theater. Nonetheless, Voltaire's satire Candide was forbidden, due to the way it portrayed Portuguese societey during and after the 1755 Lisbon earthquake.

== Liberalism ==
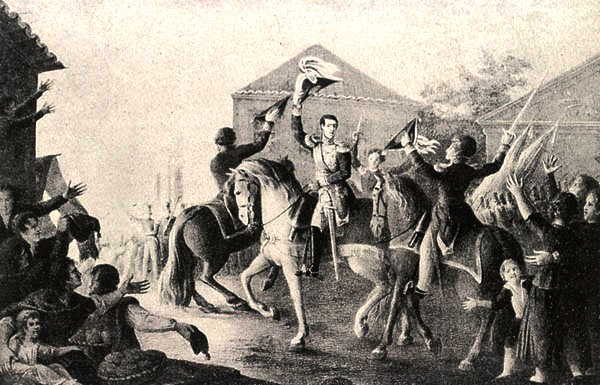
The Vilafrancada, Led by Miguel of Portugal would bring to an end the short period of freedom enjoyed during the Liberalism.

Mary I's Carta de Lei (law) of 1787 replaced the Real Mesa Censória with the Mesa da Comissão Geral sobre o Exame e Censura dos Livros (Board of the General Commission on the Exam and Censorship of the Books), the Queen having asked Pope Pius VI to provide this organ with the adequate jurisdiction for the censorship works throughout the entire Portuguese Empire. On December 17, 1793 Portugal returned to a system similar to the one in use before the Real Mesa Censória, with the separation of duties between 3 authorities: Pontifical, Royal and Episcopal. This meant that the Inquisition once again set foot on Portuguese lands. These were, however, times of change. Some periodicals, like the Correio Brasiliense (1808), the Investigador Português (1811), and the Campeão Português, managed to evade investigation during this period. During the Peninsular War, a rigorous regime of censorship was instituted by the French authorities, similar to the one in place in France at the time. Despite that, clandestine newspapers were still published. It would be from London, however, that the political refugees, with the support of local Portuguese merchants, would start an abundant literary production and an effort to translate the most important liberal works by John Locke, Adam Smith and Benjamin Franklin, among others, and establish dozens of periodicals, some of them being printed until after the Civil War.

The Decree of March 31, 1821 brought the "Tribunal do Santo Oficio" (the Inquisition) to an end, because it is found to be "incompatible with the principles adopted as basis for the Constitution", being "the spiritual and the merely ecclesiastical causes" returned to the "Episcopal Jurisdiction". The Constitution of 1822 established the freedom of the press ("the free communication of thoughts"), without the need for prior censorship, though it still reserved the possibility for any abuse to be punished "in the cases and the way the law determines". The censorship in matters of religion was left, reserved to the ecclesiastical episcopal power, being the government obligated to help the bishops in punishing whoever was found guilty. This period of relative freedom, would however, be a short one. With the Vilafrancada, one year later, prior censorship was once again reintroduced. On November 13, John VI, aware of the revolutionary influences that were coming into the country through several newspapers printed abroad, extended censorship also to include international papers, which would, from then on, require a royal license to enter the country. From 1824, censorship was handled by two instances (being the third one, the Inquisition definitely extinct): the "Censura do Ordinário" (Ordinary Censor) and the "Desembargo do Paço" (roughly the Custom House Censor, for foreign materials).

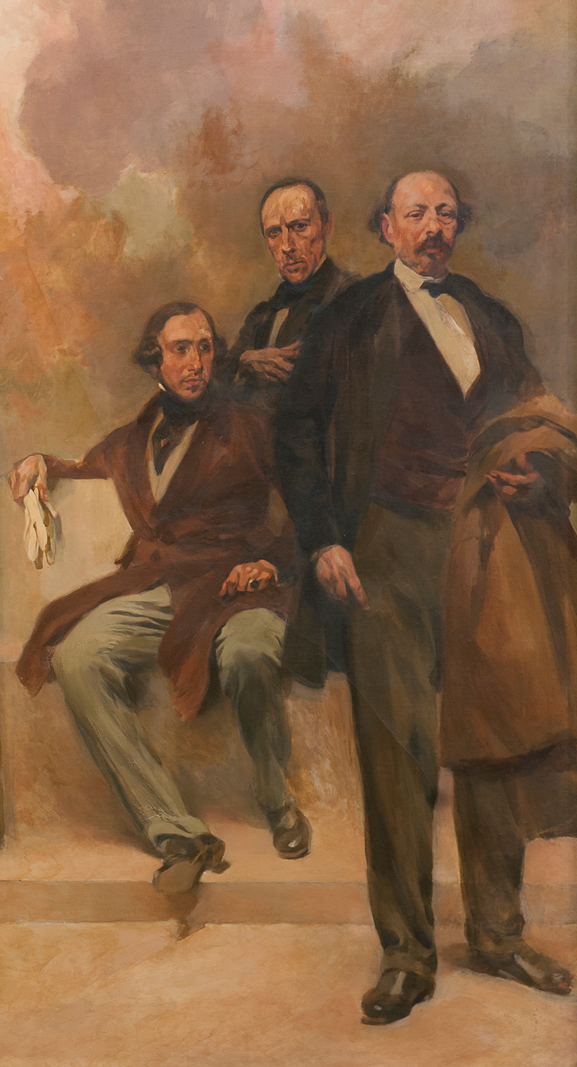
Among the most outspoken intellectuals against censorship we find Almeida Garrett, Alexandre Herculano and José Estêvão de Magalhães.

The "Carta Constitucional" (Constitutional Charter) of 1826 once again rejected prior censorship, as is stated in article 145, third paragraph: "Everyone can communicate their thoughts by words and writings, and publish them through the press, without depending upon censorship, as long as they are made to answer for any abuse that is committed while exercising that right, in the cases and form prescribed by the law". Quickly, however, the government tried to establish a stricter control in its press policies. Francisco Manuel Trigoso, the chief of government, established on September 23, the "Comissão de Censura" (Censorship Commission) for "handbills and periodical writings" (newspapers). By August 16, 1828, this commission had been abolished, with its censorship responsibilities being transferred to the "Mesa do Desembargo do Paço" (the appellate court).

It would be on November 21, 1833, with the liberal regime in place, that Joaquim António de Aguiar would sign a decreto-lei nominating those responsible for the prior censorship of Portuguese newspapers until a law that agreed with the constitutional principle came into force (a Decreto-Lei (decree) is a law enacted by the government alone, as opposed to the parliament, and is usually accepted as morally weaker). This law would be signed into effect on December 22, 1834, abolishing prior censorship, but making provisions for the prosecution of abuses, namely those against the Roman Catholic Church, the state, or the "bons costumes" (good habits - the public morals), and for slander.

On February 3, 1840, a complaint was brought by the owners of typographical workshops to the Câmara dos Deputados (Chamber of Deputies - the parliament), alleging that "without condemnation or sentence", they had been the victims of the whims of the authorities (police) which had been coming into the workshops and destroying their presses. On the night of August 11 of that same year, there was rioting in the streets of Lisbon, which lead Queen Mary II to begin a cycle of constant and successive "temporary" elimination of liberties, like the freedom of press, resulting in further rioting. The law of October 19, drafted by Costa Cabral, forced publishers to pay hefty bonds, deposits and mortgages, and to submit to an exam qualifying them as honorable persons. Press freedom would only be formally reestablished through the law of August 3, 1850 (known as the "Lei das Rolhas" [the bottle-corks law]), even though public opinion did not regard it as being in the spirit of the Constitution, because it still contained heavy sanctions which in practice completely restricted the activity of writers and journalists. Among the intellectuals that rebelled against this law were Alexandre Herculano, Almeida Garrett, António Pedro Lopes de Mendonça, José Estêvão de Magalhães and Latino Coelho. Also sharing this opinion was the Duque of Saldanha, who shortly after rising to power, revoked it, opening a period known as the "Regeneração" (regeneration/renewal) which would be especially welcomed by journalists after the law of May 17, 1866 specifically abolished any "bonds or restrictions to the periodical press".

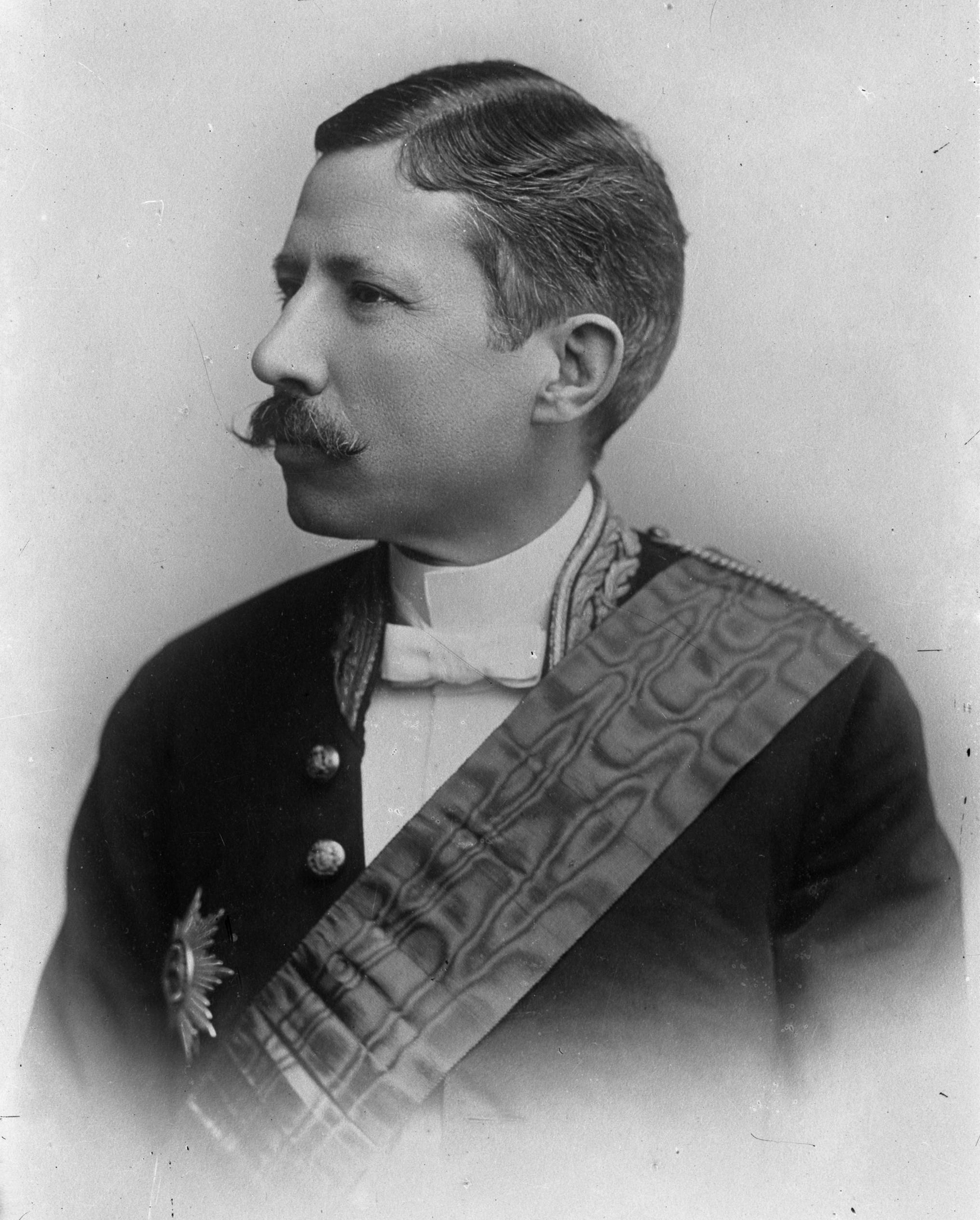
The dictatorship of João Franco shaped much of the censorship policy of the last years of the monarchy in Portugal.

The monarchic regime, however, tried to face the growing power of republican ideals. The first repressive action taken in this context was the closure of the Conferências do Casino (the Casino Conferences, republican public meetings), where Antero de Quental, Augusto Soromenho, Eça de Queiroz and Adolfo Coelho had already spoken. When Salomão Saragga was to take the stand to speak about the "Divinity of Jesus", the room was closed, under the pretext that the discussions were offensive to religion and to the "Fundamental Code of the Monarchy". After the protests of a few dozen Portuguese intellectuals against this attitude of the government, Antero de Quental and Jaime Batalha appealed the parliament to recognize these actions as illegal. Deputy Luis de Campos brought his protest to the Marquês de Ávila e Bolama, the Prime Minister at the time: "sue them but don't shut them down, you don't have the power for that".

On March 29, 1890, a dictatorial decree imposed severe sanctions on newspaper publishers, and forceful closure should they repeat the offense. On February 13, 1896 the government of Hintze Ribeiro took even more drastic actions. Despite no legal provisions existing for prior censorship, the police seized any materials that criticized the monarchic institutions. It would be another two years until the press once again enjoyed more freedom. This state of things would last until June 20, 1907, when through a coup d'etat João Franco came to power, and any "writings, drawings or printed papers deemed dangerous to public order or security" were forbidden. The Governadores Civis (Civil Governors - the representative of the central government in the district) were allowed to close down newspapers. This law would be officially repealed when Manuel II was enthroned, but the repression would be unchanged and a "gabinete negro" (dark cabinet) would be added to every criminal court, in order to watch over the Press in each judicial district.

== First Republic ==
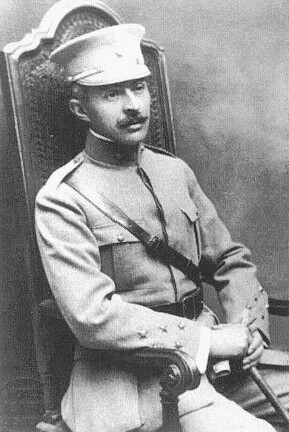
Sidónio Pais was elected while opposing the use of prior censorship but would then make use of it himself.

With the proclamation of the Republic, a new press law was quickly passed on October 28, 1910, which, according to its thirteen articles, aimed at reinstating freedom of expression. Critiques of the government or of any political or religious doctrine would no longer be impeded. However, faced with difficulties implementing the new regime, the republican government also imposed, on July 9, 1912, a set of measures and situations that warranted the confiscation of printed materials by the judicial authorities. Thus were forbidden publications of pornographic content or those that would outrage the republican institutions or jeopardize the security of the State.

Censorship was reinstated on March 12, 1916, after the declaration of war by Germany. Seizures were ordered of all documents whose publication might hinder national security or could be perceived as anti-war propaganda. Prior censorship, now a task of the Department of War, was always seen as a temporary exception, being unconstitutional. The military coup by Sidónio Pais would be in part justified with the unpopularity of prior censorship, which was now very obvious in the newspapers, as the space occupied by the censored text was intentionally left blank, so as to indicate to readers that the text had been censored. Sidónio Pais would, however, resort to prior censorship, adding it to all other repressive actions by his government until the end of the war.

== Estado Novo ==
After the 28 May 1926 coup d'état, Gomes da Costa signed a decree on July 5 that would secure freedom of thought "independent from bonds and censorship", even though it insisted on prohibiting offences to the republic's institutions or any behaviour that would disturb public order. The Press Law of the new military executive repeated almost word-for-word the assurances of article 13 from the previous Press Law, allowing criticism and discussion of legislative bills, political and religious doctrines, acts of government, and so forth, as long as the goal was to "enlighten and prepare the (public) opinion for the necessary reforms(...)". On July 29, however, prior censorship was re-instated. The Estado Novo never took a definite stance on the censorship, avoiding even discussion of the subject the few times the issue was raised in the Parliament. If only the signed legislation is taken into account, one might suppose the regime was quite lenient. On May 27, 1927 the Literary Property Law was reformed, which in its letter guaranteed censorship-free publication. A decree of September 3, 1926 had already extended the freedom of the press concept to apply on the Overseas Provinces, pending a future law that would be signed into effect on June 27, 1927.

On April 11, 1933 a new constitution was published. While its article 8, n.4, would establish the "freedom of thought under any form", n.20 of the same article states that "special laws will regulate the exercise of the freedom of expression". One article would also explain that the purpose of censorship is "to prevent the perversion of public opinion in its function of social force and (censorship) should be exercised so as to defend (public opinion) from all factors that might make it stray from the truth, justice, morality, good administration and common good, and to avoid that the fundamental principles of organization of society are attacked". As would be expected, the government reserved for itself the definition of criteria for this truth, justice, and morality. In fact it would be António de Oliveira Salazar himself who said in that same year, "Men, groups and classes see, observe things, study the events, under the light of their own interest. Only an institution has, by duty and position, to see everything under the light of everyone's interest".

The decree 22 469, published on the same day as the Constitution, was explicit in establishing prior censorship for periodicals, "handbills, leaflets, posters and other publications, whenever in any of them political or social matters are covered". By May 14, 1936, the creation of newspapers was regulated and official public notices were also removed from some of them, so as to prevent any sort of official connection between government and the press.

The Regulamento dos Serviços de Censura (Censorship Services Regulations) was adopted in November of the same year but was, however, not published in the Diário do Governo (the official journal). Whoever wanted to establish a newspaper or magazine would have to, from then on, require a permit from the direction of the Service. In order to prevent white spaces from appearing in newspapers' pages, as had happened during the First Republic, the Estado Novo would force them to completely reorganize the pages before printing, so that any traces of censorship were disguised. Adding to this, editors were sometimes forced to submit pre-press pages to the censorship commission which would make maintaining a paper unbearably expensive and eventually drove some editors into bankruptcy. In 1944 the Censorship Service fell under the Secretariado Nacional de Informação (National Information Secretariat) which in turn was under the control of Salazar himself.

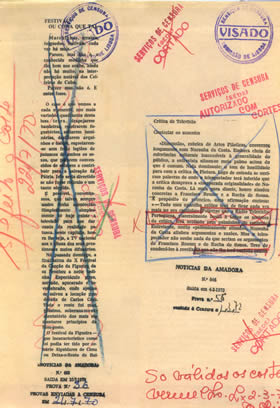
Censored newspaper pre-press proof dated July 21/1970 with the cuts and corrections imposed by the Censorship Commission of Lisbon

Using the lápis azul (blue pencil, which came to be a symbol of censorship), city and district censors would strike out any text deemed unsuitable for publication. While receiving generic instructions regarding which subjects were sensitive and should be censored, each censor would decide by himself what was admissible or not, resulting in considerable variations in what got published. This was mainly because censors were intellectually a very disparate group: while some would quickly cut any "dangerous" text, others would let by openly subversive content. This becomes readily clear by examining the original, struck-out articles preserved to date.

An order from the Direction of Censorship Services noted that, concerning children's and young adult books, "it seems desirable that the Portuguese children are educated, not as citizens of the world, in preparation, but as Portuguese children, that will soon no longer be children but will continue to be Portuguese".

Books were not subject to prior censorship, but could be confiscated after being published. This would be frequently enforced by the PIDE (the political police), which would issue search warrants for bookstores. The post office monitored any mailing of books. The Inspecção Superior de Bibliotecas e Arquivos (Library and Archive Inspection) would forbid the reading of certain documents. The Biblioteca Nacional (National Library) kept a list of books that were not to be read.

When Salazar was replaced in office by Marcello Caetano, some liberalization was promised. In an interview given to the O Estado de S. Paulo, a Brazilian newspaper, Caetano himself promised to enact a new Press law shortly thereafter. However, little did change. According to "Evolution in Continuity", Caetano's political doctrine, "Prior Censorship" was now termed "Prior Exam". The State Secretary for Information and Tourism would say that: "Nothing has changed in this house, not the spirit, nor the devotion to essential values, nor the course of action", maintaining what was Salazar's stated purpose for the institution: "To maintain the truth". As an example of the "new" state of things, on October 26, 1972, for an article about the prohibition of a play (an adaptation of "O Arco de Sant'Ana" by Almeida Garrett), the Prior Exam Services from Porto rejected a version that referred to the prohibition: "Don't mention it was forbidden. It can be said, however, that it won't come to stage".

== Present day ==
Freedom of expression was one of the achievements of the Carnation Revolution. It also quickly led critics to protest against the "excess of liberty" that was taking hold of newspapers, magazines, television, radio and cinema. Movies that had until then been forbidden started being screened, some of them many years after being filmed. Social and political satire became common in television and theater, a prime example being teatro de revista.

The Portuguese Constitution of 1976 once again included freedom of expression and information and freedom of the press in its text. Following revisions of the constitutional text have extended freedom of expression to all the media.

However, incidents of censorship still occur occasionally, in the form of appeals to entrepreneurial groups, to the government, or to lobbies, to exert their influence on the media. For example, Herman José, in 1988, had his TV series "Humor de Perdição" suspended by the RTP Management Council. The council, then headed by Coelho Ribeiro (who had been a censor during the dictatorship) justified the action by the supposedly undignified way in which the "Historical Interviews" segment (written by Miguel Esteves Cardoso) portrayed important figures in Portuguese history. References to the supposed homosexuality of King Sebastian are frequently cited as the main reason for the termination of the series.

In 1992, Under-Secretary of State for Culture, António Sousa Lara, who had final say on applications from Portugal, prevented José Saramago's "The Gospel According to Jesus Christ" from participating in the European Literary Award, claiming that the work was not representative of Portugal, but was instead divisive of the Portuguese people. As a result, and in protest against what he saw as an act of censorship by the Portuguese government, Saramago moved to Spain, taking permanent residency in Lanzarote in the Canary Islands.

In 2004, the so-called "Marcelo Rebelo de Sousa affair" became public. A former leader of the PSD, Rebelo de Sousa, was a political commentator for the TVI television station when he was pressured by the station president, Miguel Pais do Amaral and by the Minister for Parliamentary Affairs, Rui Gomes da Silva, to refrain from criticizing the government so sharply. This was regarded as unacceptable by the press and prompted Rebelo de Sousa's resignation from TVI and an investigation by the Alta Autoridade da Comunicação Social (High Authority for the Media - the media regulator) into the station which found proof of "pressures from the government and promiscuity between political and economical powers".

In 2006, Portugal was ranked at number 10 on the Press Freedom Index published by Reporters Without Borders, number 8 in 2007, number 16 in 2008 and more recently number 30 in 2009.

== Effect of censorship on Portuguese culture ==
Luís de Camões had to submit the text of Os Lusíadas to the censorship of the Inquisition, being forced to debate it verse by verse. That which is today considered the greatest poem in Portuguese language went through a phase of abandonment, being ignored and despised, which can also be considered a subtle form of censorship.

Damião de Góis received the Imprimatur for his Crónica do Felicíssimo Rei D. Manuel in 1567. Five years later, however, it was still waiting for Bishop António Pinheiro to correct an error in one of the pages. Prior censorship gave free rein to censors who could easily exploit any minuscule question they might have with the authors to delay the publication of the work.

Father António Vieira was jailed by the Inquisition from 1665 to 1667, because he openly supported the works of the New Christians and criticizing actions of the Dominican inquisitors.

More serious were the processes that involved dramatist António José da Silva, known as "O Judeu" (The Jew), who was arrested and tortured together with his mother in 1726. In 1737 he was arrested again, also with his mother, wife and daughter, being decapitated and burned in an auto-da-fé in Lisbon, his wife and mother suffering the same fate.

Francisco Xavier de Oliveira, Cavaleiro de Oliveira was luckier, managing to evade on August 18, 1761, the last auto-da-fé held in Portugal, exiling himself in the Netherlands. His works, however, were apprehended and burned.

Later, during the Estado Novo, Maria Velho da Costa, Maria Teresa Horta and Maria Isabel Barreno were involved in a court case due to the publication of their "Novas Cartas Portuguesas" (New Portuguese Letters), which allegedly contained pornographic and immoral content and which is today considered no more than a sharp criticism of the Portuguese chauvinism and a commentary on the condition of women in society.

Maria Velho da Costa would, as a reaction to these proceedings write "Ova Ortegrafia" (Ew Rthography) which begins with "(I) [h]ave [d]ecided [t]o [c]ut [m]y [w]riting, [t]hat [w]ay I [s]pare [t]he [w]ork [o]f [w]ho [w]ant [t]o [c]ut [m]e (...) " (letters within brackets added for readability).

Writers fear that their works will end up prohibited, and therefore some things are not worth writing, lest they damn the whole book. Journalists were always the ones that suffered the most from this self-imposed censorship, as they would bear responsibility for any delays in the newspaper, for some ill-pondered or reckless phase. Ferreira de Castro wrote in 1945 "Each of us, when writing, places an imaginary censor on the desk".

Some authors started using metaphors: Dawn for Socialism, Spring for Revolution, Vampire for Policeman, etc., which made some of the works unintentionally poetic, something that is today remembered with some nostalgia (even today, especially in some of the smaller newspapers, we can find an overly elaborated prose in everyday subjects). David Mourão Ferreira wrote in the poem that was later sung by Amália Rodrigues as "Fado de Peniche", "At least you can hear the wind! - At least you can hear the sea!", in a reference to the political prisoners held in Peniche Fortress, not to the fishermen of the town (fisheries and fish canning have been the most important activity in Peniche for decades). The objective of this coded wording was to induce in the audience the suspicion of everything being reported and officially sanctioned by the authorities, and let the second meaning be imagined even where there were none.

It is often told that, in a Zeca Afonso concert, the censor assigned to monitor the performance unwittingly joined the chorus singing "You'll all end up in the PIDE", being later severely punished for his naivete.

Many other authors were jailed or saw their books impounded, such as Soeiro Pereira Gomes, Aquilino Ribeiro, José Régio, Maria Lamas, Rodrigues Lapa, Urbano Tavares Rodrigues, Alves Redol, Alexandre Cabral, Orlando da Costa, Alexandre O'Neill, Alberto Ferreira, António Borges Coelho, Virgílio Martinho, António José Forte, Alfredo Margarido, Carlos Coutinho, Carlos Loures, Amadeu Lopes Sabino, Fátima Maldonado, Hélia Correia, Raul Malaquias Marques, among others.

Aquilino Ribeiro saw his book Quando os lobos uivam (When the wolves howl) confiscated in 1958. The regime brought a criminal suit against him for alleged offenses against the state, though the suit was later dropped after protests from François Mauriac, Louis Aragon, André Maurois and other foreign writers. Even upon his death, any news about these events was suppressed.

In 1965 the Sociedade Portuguesa de Autores (Portuguese Authors Society) had the audacity to present Angolan writer Luandino Vieira with the Camilo Castelo Branco Award at a time when he was serving a 14-year sentence at Tarrafal camp for terrorism (while fighting for the independence of Angola). As a consequence, the society was shut down by order of the Minister of Education, and its headquarters were vandalized. Jaime Gama, who would become foreign affairs minister in the '90s, wrote about the issue in the "Açores" newspaper and was arrested by the PIDE.

In cinema, the regime, besides prohibiting certain movies and scenes, also sought to impede the access of the less literate to certain ideas. According to law 2027 of 1948, when António Ferro was in charge of the Secretariado Nacional de Informação (National Information Secretariat), he forbade the dubbing of foreign movies, not out of any aesthetic concern, but simply because dialog could thus be left untranslated or purposely mistranslated so as to avoid forbidden subjects. Even though censorship ended, today's Portuguese moviegoers still prefer subtitles over dubbing, and in recent years even children's cartoons have been available in subtitled, non-dubbed versions.

Several Portuguese intellectuals have shown how the various forms of censorship have hindered the cultural development of Portugal. Some authors have pointed out that the Portuguese cultural elite has become something of an aristocracy, disconnected from the rest of the population. This is evident by the prevalence of a gap between popular culture and "high culture", with the arraiais (popular gathering with light music and ball dancing), pimba music (based on double-entendre or straightforward sexual slang) and rancho folclórico (folk and ethnological dancing and music groups) on one side, and literature, drama and classical music on the other. Portugal has become one of the countries in Europe with the lowest attendances of theater and the lowest rates of book reading. The traditionally bad box-office results of Portuguese cinema, compared to the amount of foreign awards the same movies get, is also pointed out as a result of this gap.

== See also ==
- Internet censorship and surveillance in Portugal

== Sources ==
- Rodrigues, Graça Almeida (1980). "Breve história da censura literária em Portugal" (PDF) (in Portuguese). 54. Amadora: Ministério da Educação e Ciência. Archived from the original (PDF) on 2007-09-30.
