= José Fontana =

José Fontana may refer to:

- José Fontana (publisher) (1840–1876), Swiss-Italian-born naturalized-Portuguese publisher, intellectual and co-founder of the Portuguese Socialist Party
- José Fontana (footballer) (1912–1986), Brazilian footballer
