= Francisco Adolfo Coelho =

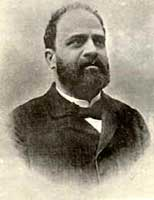
- Francisco Adolfo Coelho.
- Born: 15 January 1847; Coimbra, Kingdom of Portugal
- Died: 9 February 1919 (aged 72); Carcavelos, Portuguese Republic
- Occupations: Philologist; Pedagogist
- Known for: Tales of Old Lusitania

Francisco Adolfo Coelho (Coimbra, 15 January 1847 — Carcavelos, 9 February 1919) was a Portuguese self-taught philologist and pedagogist. He is known for his monograph of Portuguese dialects spoken outside of Portugal, being the first person to have recorded the use of Macanese Patois ("Patuá", a critically endangered creole language spoken in Macau), as well as his compilation of Portuguese folklore, Tales of Old Lusitania.

== Biography ==
His childhood was filled with hardships. When he was 19 months old, his dad died. He went secondary school in Coimbra. At 15, he enrolled in the Mathematics course at university. Unsatisfied with the environment he found himself in, he drops out two years after. He then imposed himself a study program centered around German authors, learning effectively German.

During his life he did notable work in pedagogy, linguistics, ethnography and anthropology, He taught at the Higher Course of Letters, teaching Comparative Roman Philology and Portuguese Philology and watched its transformation into the Faculty of Letters of the University of Lisbon. He was the director of the Superior Primary School of Rodrigues Sampaio, created by him. He also taught at the Superior Normal School of Lisbon. He participated in numerous commissions of middle and upper school, as a member or president, having elaborated important reports. He spoke in the famous Casino Conferences, organized by Antero de Quental and Jaime Batalha Reis. In A Questão do Ensino (1872), Coelho talks about the need and ends of teaching; examines its forms and types; the education in Portugal in decadence due to the alliance of Church and State, defends their separation; promotes the freedom of thinking.

His pedagogical conceptions were based on the conviction that through education it would be possible to regenerate the country. He combated against the submission of education to religious ideas. He organized an important Pedagogical Museum in the Old School of the Primary Magistracy of Lisbon.

His collaboration in periodical publications is found on: Renascença (1878-1879?), O Pantheon (1880-1881), Froebel (1882-1884), Branco e Negro (1896-1898), Serões (1901-1911) and in the Jornal dos Cegos (1895-1920).

== Bibliography ==
- Leal, João (2018). « Collecte et interprétation, ethnologie et nation : vie et œuvre d’Adolfo Coelho », in BEROSE – International Encyclopaedia of the Histories of Anthropology, Paris.
