= Bartolomeu de Quental =

17th-century Portuguese preacher and theologian

The Reverend Father, Venerable Bartolomeu de Quental C.O.
- Preacher of the Royal Chapel and Chaplain-Confessor of the Royal Household
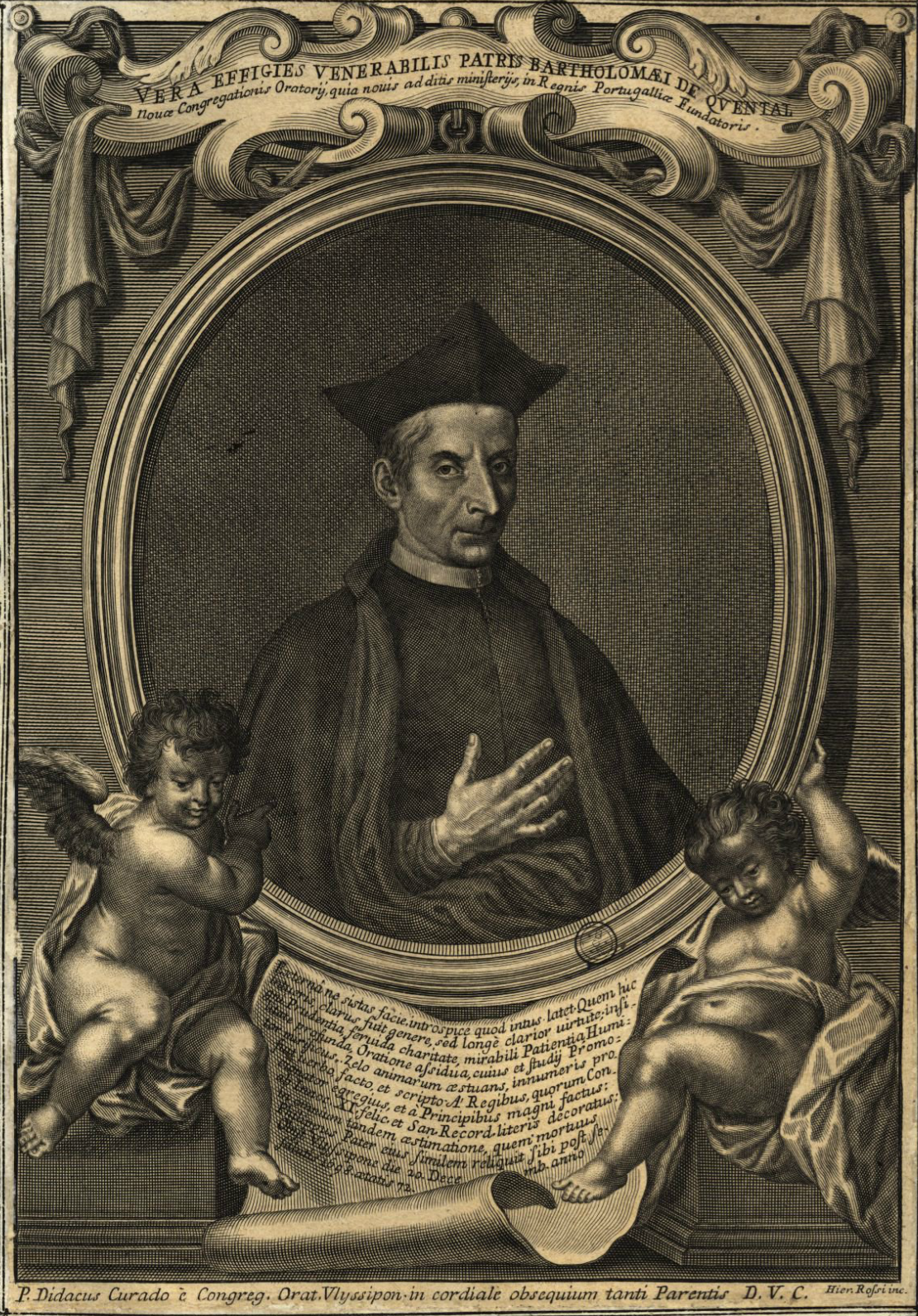
- Engraved portrait of Bartolomeu de Quental, Girolamo Rossi, National Library of Portugal
- Church: Roman Catholic Church
- Diocese: Archdiocese of Lisbon

Personal details
- Born: 22 August 1626 Fenais da Luz, São Miguel, Azores, Portugal
- Died: 20 December 1698 (aged 72) Lisbon, Portugal
- Education: University of Évora

Bartolomeu de Quental, C.O. (22 August 1626 – 20 December 1698) was a Portuguese Catholic priest, theologian, and preacher. Quental was the founder of the first Congregation of the Oratory of Saint Philip in Portugal in 1668.

The cause for his canonisation was officially opened c. 1720. In 1748, Pope Benedict XIV officially recognised that Quental had lived a life of "heroic virtue", and he has since been referred to as "venerable", although the cause for his beatification has lain dormant since the time of the Marquis of Pombal and the weakening of the Congregation of the Oratory in Portugal.

== Early life ==
Bartolomeu de Quental was born on 22 August 1627 in Fenais da Luz, São Miguel Island in the Azores. He was the son of Francisco de Andrade Cabral and of Ana de Quental Novais. He was baptised in the Parish of Our Lady of Light (Nossa Senhora da Luz) and was named "Bartolomeu" due to the proximity of the feast day of Saint Bartholomew the Apostle. The family was devoutly Catholic.

He was an accomplished student as a young man: he had a firm grasp of Latin at the age of twelve and concluded his studies of grammar ahead of his peers. It was customary at the time for only the first born, in this case his older brother Pedro de Matos de Quental, to pursue further studies, which meant Bartolomeu would not be able to travel to Mainland Portugal to study Philosophy as he wished. At the last moment, his brother gave Bartolomeu the opportunity instead.

Quental arrived in Lisbon at the age of 16, travelling to Évora to enroll in the Royal College of Arts (Real Colégio das Artes) of the Jesuit-run University of Évora. He achieved the degree of Artium Magister in 1647 after studying under Fr. Diogo Fernandes, one of the most distinguished professors in Évora.

Quental then achieved the highest possible grade in his bachelor's degree and later in 1647 achieved a licentiate degree in Philosophy. The following year, he concluded his doctorate in Philosophy.

He enrolled in Theology around the same time and went to the University of Coimbra in 1650. Already a deacon, he became a well known preacher, and soon received invitations to preach at court. At this time, he was considered the second-best public speaker in the kingdom, after the Jesuit António Vieira.

He was ordained a priest in 1652, by D. Francisco de Sotomayor, Titular Bishop of Targa (Auxiliary Bishop of Lisbon), at the Church of the Holy Spirit of the Quarry (Espírito Santo da Pedreira). During his first two years as a priest, he was active in pastoral activity throughout the archdiocese, travelling to many cities and towns to gain firsthand understanding of the needs of the people.

In 1654, Quental petitioned the king for the vacant position of parish priest of the Church of Our Lady of the Star (Nossa Senhora da Estrela) in Ribeira Grande, near his hometown. He was appointed to the position, but soon resigned. Biographers posit this was due to his feeling unprepared for "the healing of souls" and, more importantly, a continuing interest in missionary work.

== Court preacher ==
On 22 October 1654, King John IV named Fr. Bartolomeu de Quental a "supranumerary preacher" of the Royal Chapel, and a Chaplain-Confessor of the Royal Household at the age of 27. Quental was at this time already famous around Lisbon for his learned sermons.

As a spiritual director, Quental was a popular chaplain and confessor at court. His sermons were well attended and the noble ladies at court attended both his morning prayers and his nightly spiritual exercises. His efforts to reform the mores at court were successful, with many remarking that the virtue and religious devotion of Queen Luisa de Guzmán's ladies-in-waiting was the envy of many nunneries around the kingdom. Among the regular attendees at Bartolomeu de Quental's functions was the Infanta Catherine of Braganza, later Queen consort of England, whose devotion to the Roman Catholic faith in which she had been raised would make her unpopular in England.

== Origins of the Congregation of the Oratory ==
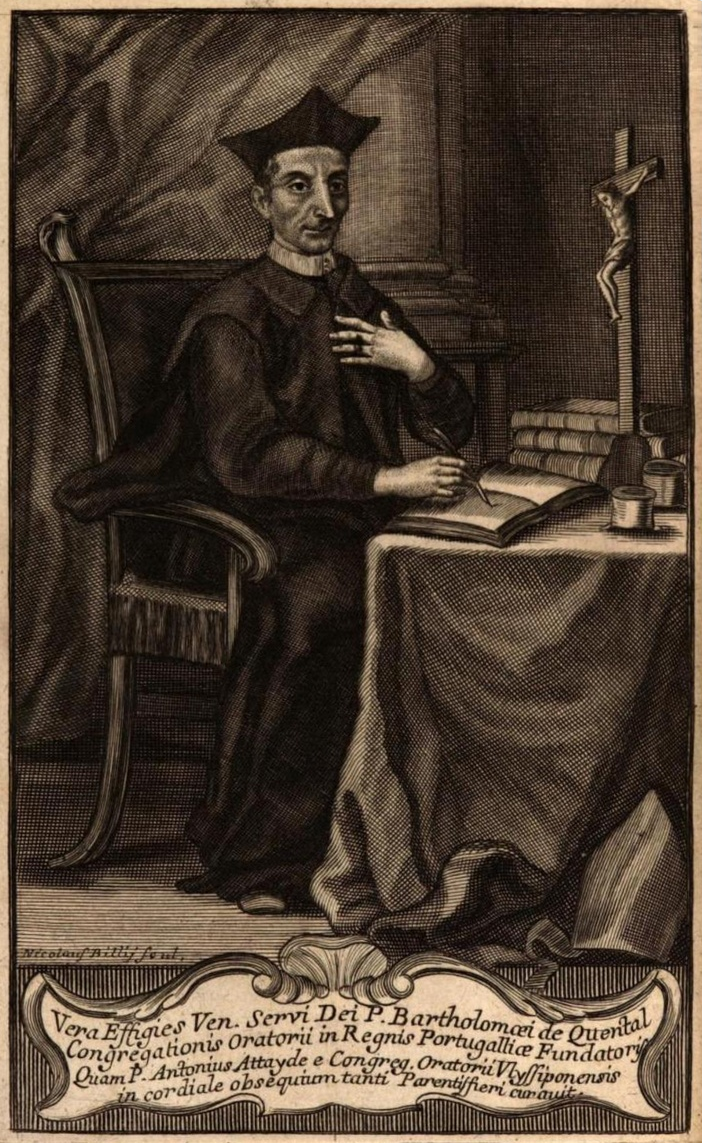
Engraved portrait of Bartolomeu de Quental in the frontispiece of De Vita Venerabilis Bartholomaei de Quental

From 1640–1668, Portugal was engaged in the long and economically straining Portuguese Restoration War against Spain. Quental's reforming zeal derived from this difficult national context, which resulted in a lack of preparation of the clergy, as well as poor conditions for them to exercise their priestly munus with the proper dignity.

Between 1657 and 1658, Quental tried to gather all chaplains and clergy of the Royal Chapel into a small community of "priests who are devout and zealous in the salvation of souls, so that, through their example, they would attract the people to their spiritual exercises", but faced much resistance. On 18 February 1659, he instituted a confraternity with a particular focus on the practice of the works of mercy under the patronage of Our Lady of Saudades, which was approved by decree of Queen Luisa de Guzmán.

Meanwhile, in 1664, Quental stepped down from his role of court confessor to focus on his missionary work with the poor in rural areas of the archdiocese. He worked long days in this service:

"He rose at the break of dawn and immediately engaged in mental prayer and mass. After a light meal, he went to the confessional, where he spent nearly all day hearing innumerable penitents. Late in the afternoon, after the Vespers' bell, he climbed to the pulpit, where he preached and rounded off the day with collective prayer. His schedule, sometimes, was so full that he often ended up sleeping in churches or churchyards, draped only in his cape."

The political intrigue during the reign of King Afonso VI, may also have contributed to Quental's departure from court. Taking advantage of his proximity to the queen, Quental had harshly criticised the young king in his sermons for his excesses and unbecoming public behaviour. When Afonso VI's brother, Infante Peter (later, King Peter II) had Afonso deemed incapable of ruling and assumed power as regent in 1668, Quental was invited back to the Royal Chapel, but refused.

Instead, drawing on the popularity and successful model of his Confraternity of Our Lady of Saudades, his new project was to institute a formal congregation, inspired by the Congregation of the Oratory that had been established in Rome in 1575 by Saint Philip Neri. He asked formal permission of the Chapter of the See of Lisbon (which was vacant at the time), and received it on 8 January 1668. The royal authorisation came on 23 March 1668.

Quental's statutes drew inspiration from both the Italian Oratorians (which were independent and autonomous communities) and the French Oratorians (founded in 1611 by Pierre de Bérulle, which operated under a tighter organisational structure, under the authority of a Superior-General). Like the Italian Oratorians, the Portuguese congregation stressed the practice of charity, prayer, the restriction of excessive mortification, and the lack of formal vows. However, they shared a somewhat more centralised form of governance like the French Oratorians, while reserving some degree of autonomy for the individual communities. The statutes were recognised by Pope Clement X, though the brief Ex injuncto nobis, on 24 August 1672.

== Death and legacy ==
Bartolomeu de Quental died on 20 December 1698, with a reputation for sanctity. The Oratorian Fathers attempted to advance the cause for his canonisation after his death, and it was officially opened c. 1720.

Due to Quental's time as a preacher and confessor at court, the Oratorians were able to secure support from the throne for this endeavour. In 1733, Fr. António de Ataíde was sent to Rome to negotiate the cause for beatification. Around this time that Fr. José Catalano wrote Quental's first biography, De Vita Venerabilis Bartholomaei de Quental, dedicated to King John V (translated to Portuguese by Cândido Lusitano in 1741, under the title Vida do Venerável Padre Bartolomeu de Quental). Ataíde died and was replaced as postulator by Luís António Verney. In 1740 he was relieved by two Oratorian Fathers sent to Rome by King John V, but was once again charged with the cause for beatification after their deaths. Quental's spiritual writings were approved by theologians on 1 August 1742.

On 8 April 1744, the cause for Quental's beatification was formally opened, and he was given the title Servant of God. In 1748, Pope Benedict XIV officially recognised that Quental had lived a life of "heroic virtue" – a major step towards beatification – and he has since been referred to as "Venerable", although the cause for his beatification has lain dormant since the time of the Marquis of Pombal in the second half of the 18th century, and the subsequent waning influence of the Congregation of the Oratory in Portugal.
