= Fenais da Luz =

- Civil parish
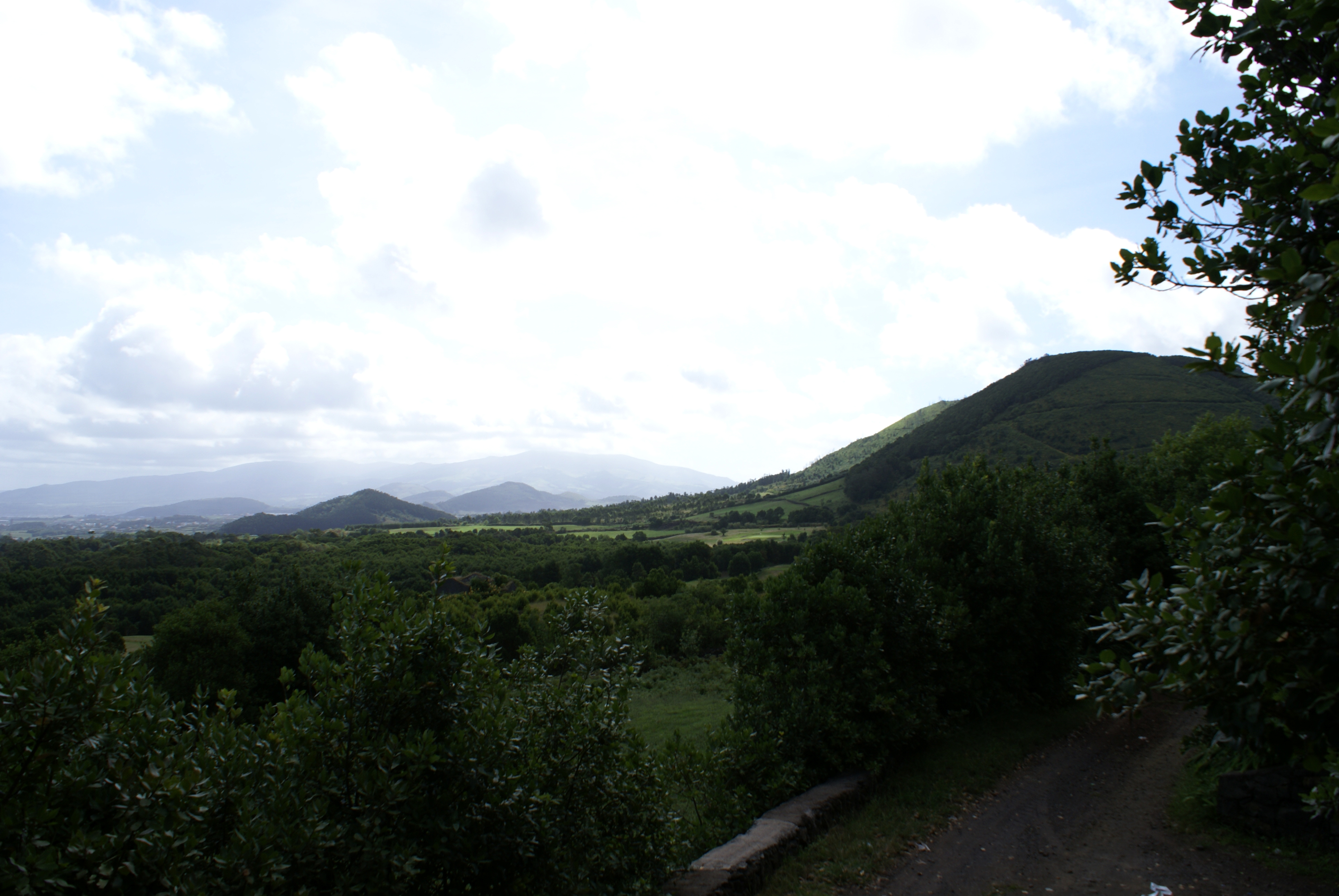
- A scenic vista from the foothills of Fenais da Luz, located near Aflitos and the area of Batalha

- Location of the civil parish of Fenais da Luz in the municipality of Ponta Delgada
- Coordinates: 37°48′39″N 25°38′15″W
- Country: Portugal
- Auton. region: Azores
- Island: São Miguel
- Municipality: Ponta Delgada

Area
  - Total: 7.69 km^{2} (2.97 sq mi)
- Elevation: 113 m (371 ft)

Population (2011)
  - Total: 2,009
  - Density: 261/km^{2} (677/sq mi)
- Time zone: UTC−01:00 (AZOT)
  - Summer (DST): UTC+00:00 (AZOST)
- Postal code: 9545-218
- Area code: 296
- Patron: Nossa Senhora da Luz
- Website: www.fenaisdaluz.com

Fenais da Luz is a civil parish in the municipality of Ponta Delgada on the island of São Miguel in the Portuguese archipelago of the Azores. The population in 2011 was 2,009, in an area of 7.69 square kilometres (2.97 mi^{2}).

== History ==
The origin of the place name was justified by Gaspar Frutuoso as originating from the abundance of natural fenal that grew in the fields; fenais is Portuguese word for fenal. Writing in the Saudades da Terra referred:

"...the place of Fenais, in the 'courtyard' of the city of Ponta Delgada, there said, with letter changed and corrupted, to there being much fenal".

Its parochial church, dedicated to Our Lady of Light (in 1756) was constructed over the ruins of an older episode. The church was identified by Queen D. Maria I in the celebration marking the defeat between forces of D. António, Prior of Crato and Philip II of Spain in 1582.

== Geography ==
Fenais da Luz is located on the north coast of the island and includes, along with the principal settlement of Fenais, the localities of Aflitos and Farropo.

== Architecture ==
- Church of Nossa Senhora das Luz (Portuguese: Igreja de Nossa Senhora da Luz)
- Hermitage of Bom Jesus of Aflitos (Portuguese: Ermida do Bom Jesus dos Aflitos)
- Hermitage of São Pedro (Portuguese: Ermida de São Pedro)
