= Jaime Batalha Reis =

Portuguese agronomist and diplomat

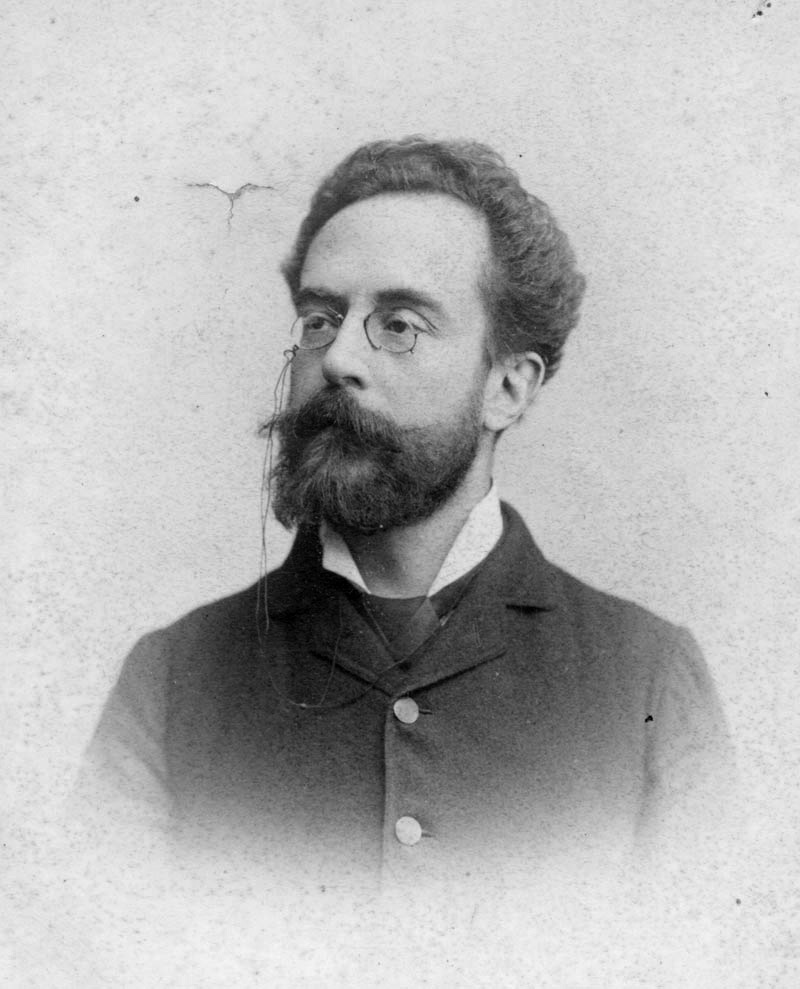
- Born: 24 December 1847; Lisbon, Portugal
- Died: 1934 (aged 86–87); Portugal
- Occupations: Agronomist and diplomat

Jaime Batalha Reis (1847 – 24 December 1934) was a Portuguese agronomist and diplomat, born in Lisbon on 24 December 1847.

== Background ==
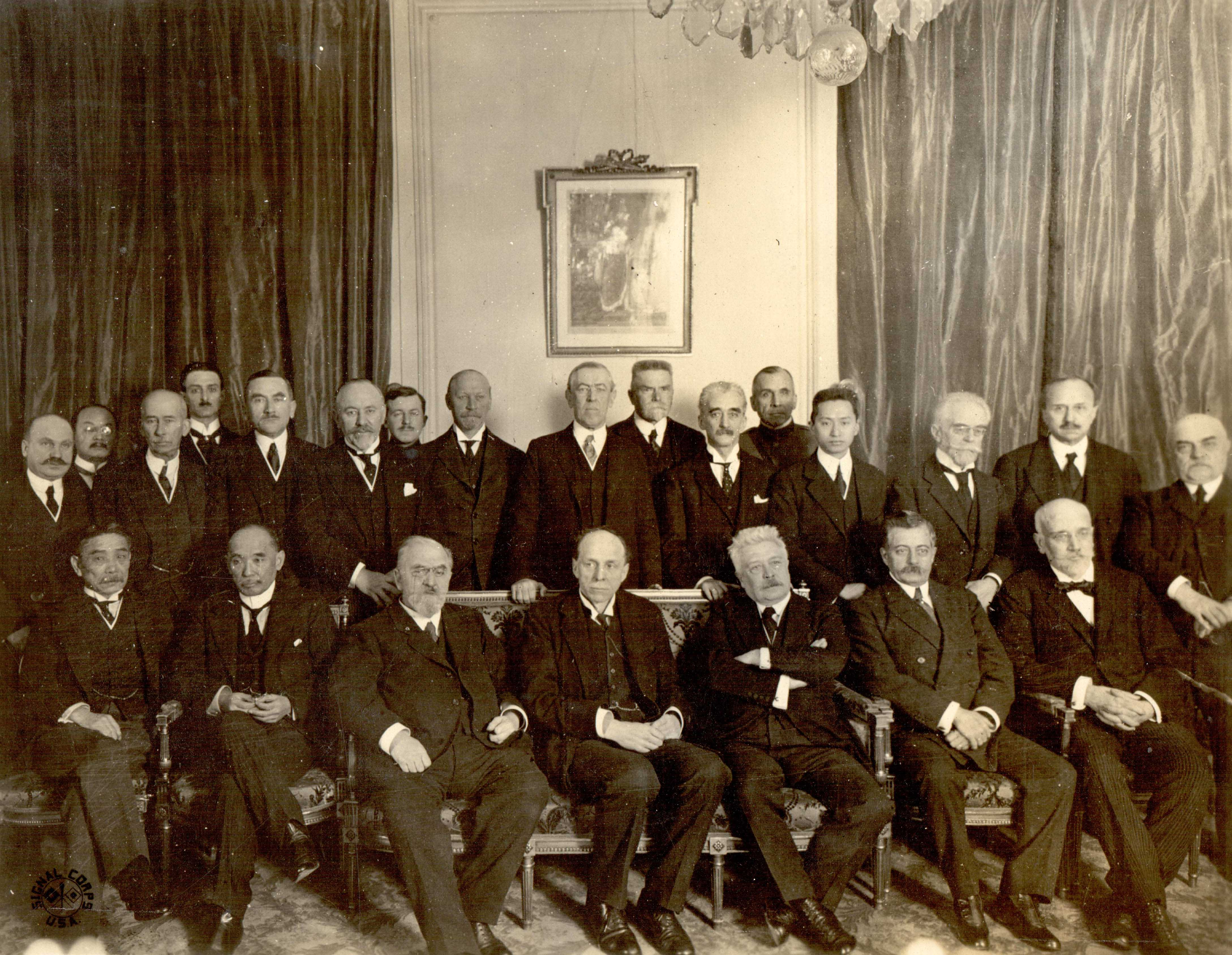
Reis standing 3rd from right at the League of Nations Commission 1919

He received a degree from the Instituto Geral de Agricultura in agronomy, where he later became a professor. He was associated with liberal literary circles associated with the poet Antero de Quental, and was one of the founders of the magazine Revista Ocidental in 1875.

He became consul at Newcastle, United Kingdom in 1882, and remained in the diplomatic service for the remainder of his life. He was active in negotiation about the Portuguese colonies in Africa, and was elected a member of the Royal Geographical Society. After the establishment of the Portuguese First Republic, he was appointed Minister to Russia, and then his country's delegate to the 1919 Versailles Peace Conference and the commission to write the Covenant of the League of Nations.
