= José Fontana (publisher) =

Portuguese politician (1840–1876)

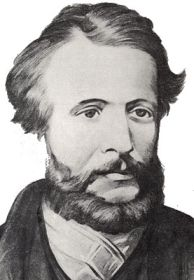
José Fontana.

Giuseppe Silo Domenico Fontana, known as José Fontana (28 October 1840 in Cabbio – 2 September 1876 in Lisbon) was a Swiss-Italian-born naturalized-Portuguese publisher, intellectual and one of the founders of the Portuguese Socialist Party.
